= Piano Concerto in G major (Ravel) =

Concerto by Maurice Ravel

- by Maurice Ravel
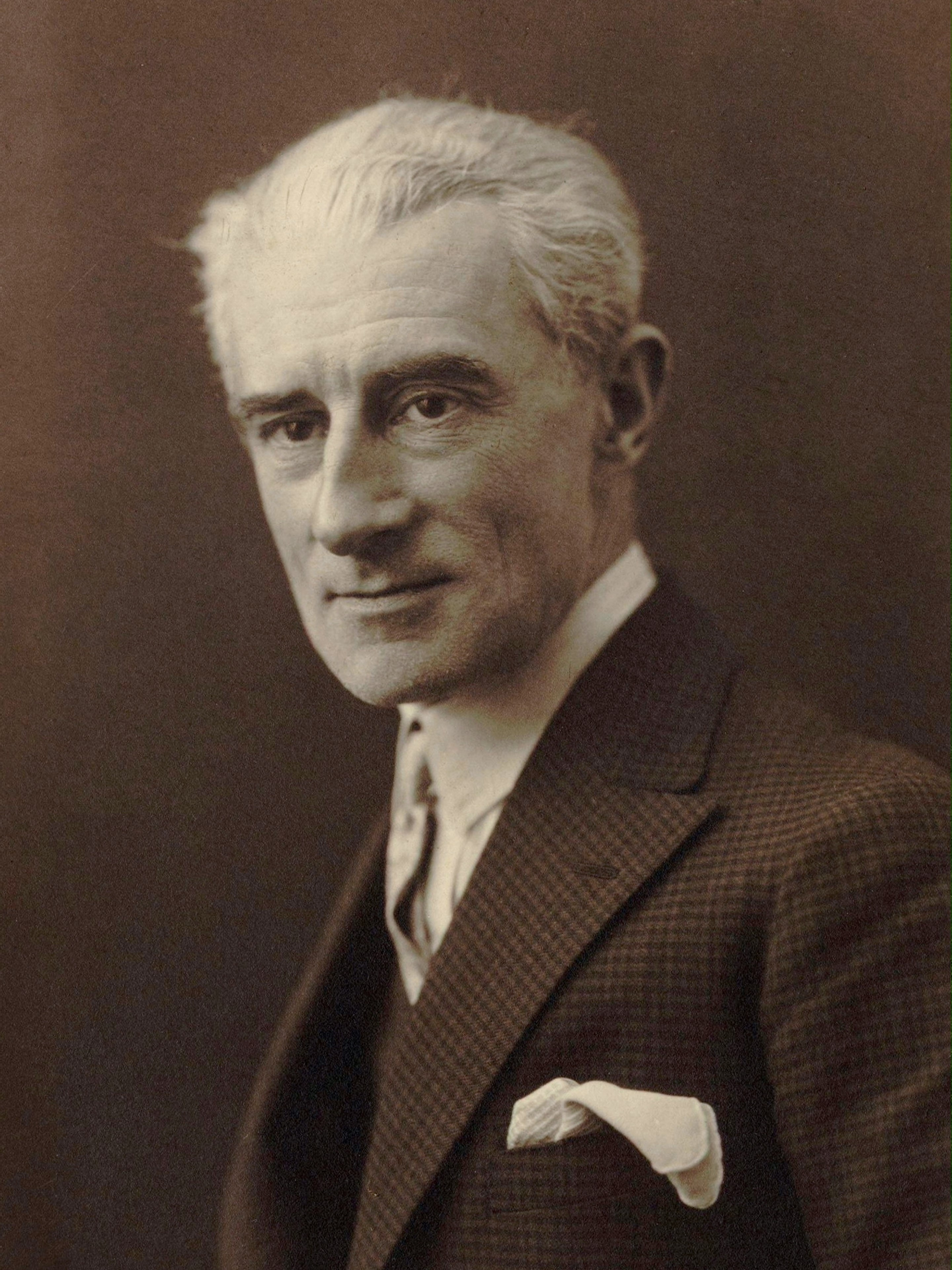
- Ravel c. 1925
- Catalogue: M. 83
- Composed: 1929–1931
- Dedication: Marguerite Long
- Movements: 3

Maurice Ravel's Piano Concerto in G major was composed between 1929 and 1931. The piano concerto is in three movements, with a total playing time of a little over 20 minutes. Ravel said that in this piece he was not aiming to be profound but to entertain, in the manner of Mozart and Saint-Saëns. Among its other influences are jazz and Basque folk music.

The first performance was given in Paris in 1932 by the pianist Marguerite Long, with the Orchestre Lamoureux conducted by the composer. Within months the work was heard in the major cities of Europe and in the US. It has been recorded many times by pianists, orchestras and conductors from all over the world.

== Background and first performance ==
The concerto was Ravel's penultimate composition. He had contemplated a piano concerto, based on Basque themes, in 1906; he returned to the idea in 1913, but abandoned work on the piece in 1914. (Note: The concerto was to be called Zaspiak-Bat (The Seven Are One), a single movement work with seven episodes, each using a theme from one of the seven Basque provinces.) Fifteen years elapsed before he turned once more to the idea of writing a concerto. He began sketching it in 1929 but throughout his career he had been a slow, painstaking worker, and it was nearly three years before the concerto was finished. He was obliged to put it to one side while he worked to a deadline to write another concerto, the D major, for the left hand, commissioned by Paul Wittgenstein.

The biographer Arbie Orenstein writes that while touring the US in 1928, Ravel had been "impressed by its jazz, Negro spirituals and the excellence of its orchestras". Jazz had been popular in Paris since the start of the decade: Ravel had first heard, and enjoyed, it in 1921, and its influence is heard in the violin sonata, completed in 1927, and in the D major piano concerto. (Note: Ravel remarked that "The most captivating part of jazz is its rich and diverting rhythm. ... Jazz is a very rich and vital source of inspiration for modern composers and I am astonished that so few Americans are influenced by it." The music critic Jonathan Swain suggests that a theme in the first movement, shortly before figure 10 in the 1932 Durand score of the G major concerto, is reminiscent of "J'ai deux amours", a song made famous in Paris by Josephine Baker.) The Basque theme mooted in 1906 and 1913 was not wholly abandoned. His colleague Gustave Samazeuilh believed that Ravel drew on his earlier ideas for the outer movements of the G major concerto, and Orenstein notes a Basque influence in the opening theme of the work.

In an interview with the music critic Pierre Leroi, published in October 1931, Ravel said:

My only wish … was to write a genuine concerto, that is, a brilliant work, clearly highlighting the soloist's virtuosity, without seeking to show profundity. As a model, I took two musicians who, in my opinion, best illustrated this type of composition: Mozart and Saint-Saëns. This is why the concerto, which I originally thought of entitling Divertissement, contains the three customary parts: the initial Allegro, a compact classical structure, is followed by an Adagio, in which I wanted to render particular homage to "scholasticism", and in which I attempted to write as well as I could; to conclude, a lively movement in Rondo form, likewise conceived in accordance with the most immutable traditions.

He had intended to be the soloist in the first public performance of the new work, but fatigue, poor health and pressure of work led him to offer the premiere to Marguerite Long, to whom he dedicated the concerto. Long, who was known for her performances of the works of Fauré and Debussy had earlier asked Ravel for a new work. She received the completed score on 11 November 1931, and played the concerto at the Salle Pleyel on 14 January 1932, with Ravel conducting the Orchestre Lamoureux.

A few days after the premiere, Ravel and Long began a European tour with the concerto, playing in sixteen cities, starting in Antwerp and including Brussels, Vienna, Bucharest, Prague, London, Warsaw, Berlin, Amsterdam and Budapest. The first North American performances were given on 22 April 1932, in Boston and Philadelphia. (Note: The soloist in Boston was Jesús María Sanromá, with the Boston Symphony Orchestra conducted by Serge Koussevitzky; in Philadelphia the soloist was Sylvan Levin, with the Philadelphia Orchestra conducted by Leopold Stokowski.)

== Instrumentation ==
Ravel told Leroi, "In order not to needlessly weigh down the orchestral texture, I called for a reduced orchestra: the usual strings are joined only by one flute, piccolo, oboe, cor anglais, two bassoons, two horns, one trumpet and one trombone". Orenstein points out that Ravel, or Leroi, forgot to mention two clarinets and the extensive range of percussion instruments.

The full tally of instruments, apart from the piano, comprises piccolo, flute, oboe, cor anglais, E♭ clarinet, clarinet in B♭ and A, 2 bassoons, 2 horns in F, trumpet in C, trombone, percussion (timpani, triangle, snare drum, cymbals, bass drum, tamtam, wood block, and whip), harp, 16 violins, 6 violas, 6 cellos, and 4 double basses.

== Structure ==
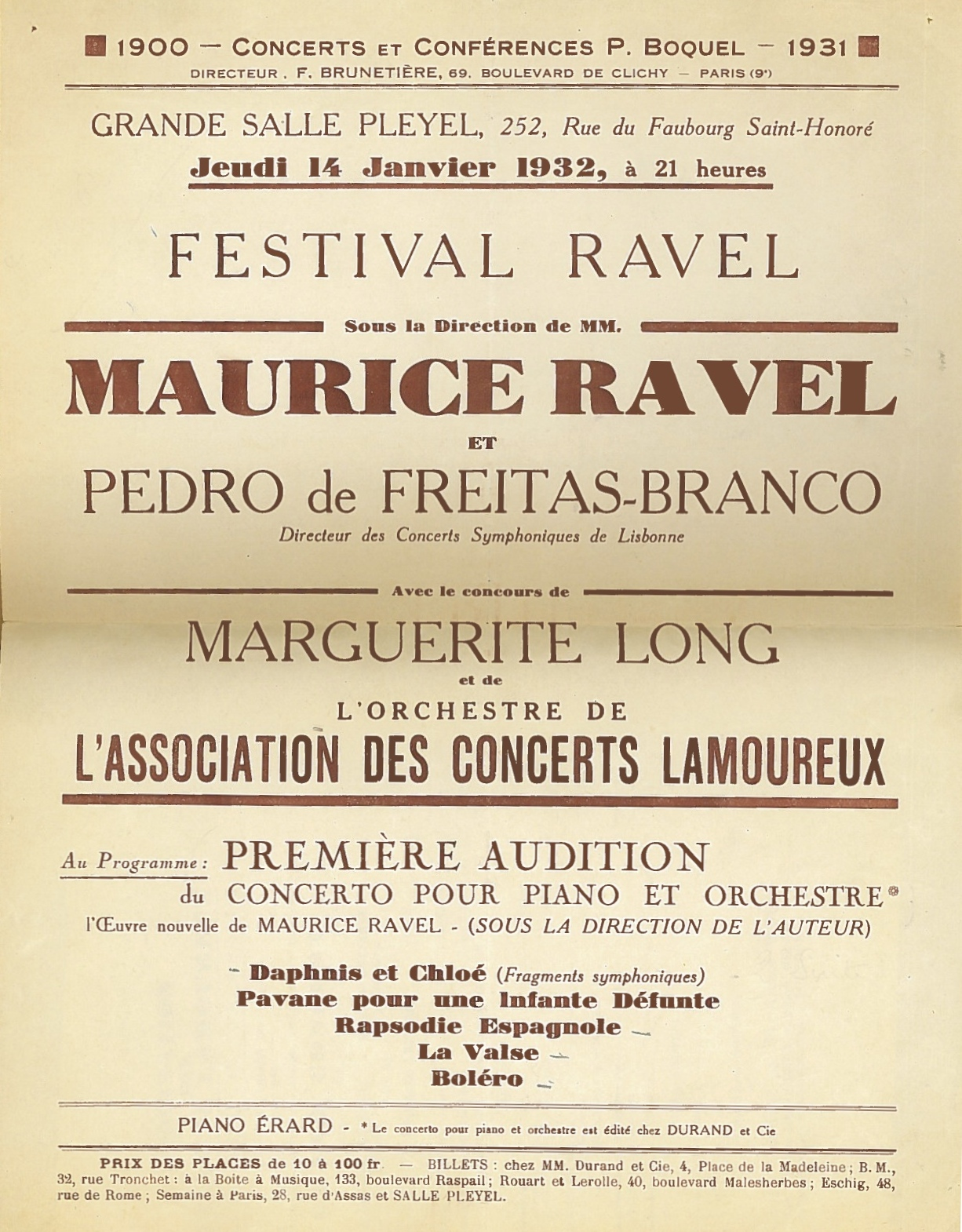
Poster for the 1932 premiere of the piano concerto

The concerto typically plays for about 22 minutes. (Note: In recordings by Krystian Zimerman, Arturo Benedetti Michelangeli, Martha Argerich and Pascal Rogé the playing times are 22m 6s, 21m 58s, 22m 14s and 22m 03s respectively.)

=== I. Allegramente ===
The first movement, in G major, is in 2/2 time. It opens with a single sharp whip-crack, followed by an exposition that contains five distinct themes. Orenstein says of them that the first suggests a Basque folk melody, the second the influence of Spain, and the other three derive from the idiom of jazz.

The development section – "a lively romp" – is followed by a cadenza-like passage leading to the recapitulation. Where a cadenza might be expected in such a concerto movement, Ravel writes three: first for harp, then for the woodwind, and finally for the piano; the last of these draws on the fifth theme of the exposition. An extended coda concludes the movement, bringing back some of the material from the development section and finishes with a series of descending major and minor triads.

=== II. Adagio assai ===
The slow movement, in E major, is in 3/4 time. In contrast with the preceding movement, it is a tranquil subject of Mozartian serenity written in ternary form. Ravel said of it, "That flowing phrase! How I worked over it bar by bar! It nearly killed me!" The first theme is presented by the piano, unaccompanied. Ravel said he took as his model the theme from the Larghetto of Mozart's Clarinet Quintet, but in an analysis of the work published in 2000, Michael Russ comments that whereas the Mozart melody unfolds across 20 bars, Ravel builds an even longer – 34-bar – melody, without repeating a single bar. The musicologist Michel Fleury calls the opening an "extended monologue in the style of a stately Sarabande", and remarks that it derives "its curiously hypnotic character" from the rhythmic discrepancy between the 3/4 time signature of the melody in the right hand and the 3/8 signature of the accompaniment. (The time signature in the score, however, is nowhere 3/8, but instead is 3/4 in all staves throughout, reinforced by consistent beaming of quavers in pairs.)

After thirty bars – about three minutes in a typical performance (Note: In the recordings by Zimerman, Michelangeli, Argerich and Rogé mentioned above, the flute enters at 3m 2s, 3m 3s, 3m 1s and 3m 10s respectively.) – the solo flute enters with a C♯ and oboe, clarinet and flute carry the melody into the second theme. There follows a more dissonant episode, imbued with what Fleury calls a slight sense of trepidation; the orchestra plays slowly ascending chord progressions while the piano part consists of "iridescent harmonies". The cor anglais [English horn] reintroduces the opening theme beneath the piano's "delicate filigree in the high register".

=== III. Presto ===
The finale, in G major, is in 2/4 time. At just under four minutes in a typical performance it is much the shortest of the three. (Note: In the recordings by Zimerman, Michelangeli, Argerich and Rogé referred to above, the movement lasts 3m 57s, 3m 58s, 3m 55s and 3m 54s, respectively.) Four brisk chords at the beginning launch what Fleury describes as "an unstoppable onslaught, spurred on by the shrieks of the clarinet and the piccolo, the donkey brays of the trombone and occasional fanfare flourishes in the brass". Orenstein finds the opening recalls the carnival atmosphere of Stravinsky's Petrushka or Satie's Parade.

The solo part begins with a series of demisemiquavers marked to be played piano – a technically demanding combination. The music progresses through several modes before coming to its conclusion with the same four chords with which the movement begins. Reviewing the premiere of the work, Henry Prunières wrote, "The spirit of jazz indeed animates this last movement ... but with extreme discretion".

== Recordings ==
The first recording of the concerto, made in 1932, featured Marguerite Long as soloist with an ad hoc orchestra of the best players in Paris, conducted, according to the label, by the composer. In fact Ravel supervised the recording sessions, while a more proficient conductor, Pedro de Freitas Branco, took the baton.

The many later recordings include:

Soloist	Orchestra	Conductor	Year
Leonard Bernstein	Philharmonia	Leonard Bernstein	1948
Monique Haas	NDR Sinfonieorchester	Hans Schmidt-Isserstedt	1948
Nicole Henriot	Paris Conservatoire	Charles Munch	1949
Jacqueline Blancard	Orchestre de la Suisse Romande	Ernest Ansermet	1953
Jean Doyen	Orchestre des Concerts Lamoureux	Jean Fournet	1955
Vlado Perlemuter	Concerts Colonne	Jascha Horenstein	1955
Arturo Benedetti Michelangeli	Philharmonia	Ettore Gracis	1957
Leonard Bernstein	Columbia Symphony	Leonard Bernstein	1958
Jean Casadesus	Orchestre de la Société des Concerts du Conservatoire	Pierre Dervaux	1958
Philippe Entremont	Philadelphia	Eugene Ormandy	1960
Samson François	Paris Conservatoire	André Cluytens	1961
Julius Katchen	London Symphony	István Kertész	1965
Monique Haas	Orchestre national de France	Paul Paray	1965
Martha Argerich	Berlin Philharmonic	Claudio Abbado	1967
Werner Haas	Orchestre national de l'Opéra de Monte-Carlo	Alceo Galliera	1969
Alicia de Larrocha	London Philharmonic	Lawrence Foster	1973
Aldo Ciccolini	Orchestre de Paris	Jean Martinon	1974
Yvonne Lefébure	Orchestre national de l'ORTF	Paul Paray	1977
Pascal Rogé	Montreal Symphony	Charles Dutoit	1982
Boris Krajný	Prague Symphony Orchestra	Jiří Bělohlávek	1984
Martha Argerich	London Symphony	Claudio Abbado	1984
Jean-Philippe Collard	Orchestre national de France	Lorin Maazel	1986
Louis Lortie	London Symphony	Rafael Frühbeck de Burgos	1989
Cécile Ousset	City of Birmingham Symphony	Simon Rattle	1991
Alicia de Larrocha	St Louis Symphony	Leonard Slatkin	1991
Hélène Grimaud	Royal Philharmonic	Jesús López Cobos	1992
Jean-Yves Thibaudet	Montreal Symphony	Charles Dutoit	1995
Krystian Zimerman	Cleveland Orchestra	Pierre Boulez	1995
Pascal Rogé	Vienna Radio Symphony	Bertrand de Billy	2004
Zoltán Kocsis	Budapest Festival	Iván Fischer	2006
Francesco Tristano Schlime	Russian National	Mikhail Pletnev	2006
Yundi Li	Berlin Philharmonic	Seiji Ozawa	2007
Pierre-Laurent Aimard	Cleveland	Pierre Boulez	2010
Martha Argerich	Orchestra della Svizzera Italiana	Jacek Kaspszyk	2012
Benjamin Grosvenor	Royal Liverpool Philharmonic	James Judd	2012
Yuja Wang	Zurich Tonnhalle	Lionel Bringuier	2015
Gabriella Montero	Orchestra of the Americas	Carlos Miguel Prieto	2019
Francesco Piemontesi	Suisse Romande	Jonathan Nott	2022
Seong-Jin Cho	Boston Symphony Orchestra	Andris Nelsons	2025

Source: WorldCat.

== Legacy ==
Ravel's Piano Concerto had presumably influenced the Japanese composer Akira Ifukube and his Godzilla's Theme, a music theme to represent the eponymous movie monster.

== Notes, references and sources ==
=== Sources ===
- Nichols, Roger (2011). Ravel. New Haven, US and London: Yale University Press. ISBN 978-0-300-10882-8.
- Orenstein, Arbie (1991) [1975]. Ravel: Man and Musician. Mineola, US: Dover. ISBN 978-0-486-26633-6.
- Orenstein, Arbie (2003) [1989]. A Ravel Reader. Mineola, US: Dover. ISBN 978-0-486-43078-2.
- Orledge, Robert (2000). "Evocations of exoticism". In Deborah Mawer (ed.). The Cambridge Companion to Ravel. Cambridge: Cambridge University Press. ISBN 978-0-521-64856-1.
- Russ, Michael (2000). "Ravel and the Orchestra". In Deborah Mawer (ed.). The Cambridge Companion to Ravel. Cambridge: Cambridge University Press. ISBN 978-0-521-64856-1.
- Sackville-West, Edward; Desmond Shawe-Taylor (1955). The Record Guide. London: Collins. OCLC 500373060.
