= Henri Ghys =

French pianist and composer

Esprit Charles Henri Ghys (17 March 1839 – 24 April 1908) was a French pianist, organist, composer and arranger of Belgian parentage, who is primarily known today as the first piano teacher of Maurice Ravel.

== Life and music ==
Henri (sometimes: Henry) Ghys was born in Toulon, department Var, in the south of France. His father was the Belgian violinist and composer Joseph Ghys (Ghent, 1801 – Saint Petersburg, 1848). He studied with Antoine Marmontel at the Paris Conservatory where he gained a First Prize for his piano playing in 1854 aged 15, having won a Second Prize in the previous year, and a "1er Accessit" on the organ in 1855.

For five years starting 31 May 1882, Ghys taught the piano to the young Maurice Ravel. Ravel's biographer Arbie Orenstein related that he preserved in his library a copy of the Ghys composition Air du Roi Louis XIII "with the following dedication: 'transcribed specially for four hands, for his little pupil Maurice Ravel, by his professor Henry Ghys, Paris, August 30, 1882.'" Ravel seems to have remained in touch with Ghys even after the period of tuition: On 15 February 1892 they performed together the Andante and Variations, Op. 46 for two pianos by Robert Schumann at the Salle Érard. "

The above-mentioned Air du Roi Louis XIII, also known as Amaryllis, was one of Ghys' most successful works. Mistakenly claimed to be a melody composed by the French king Louis XIII (in reality, it is from the Ballet Comique de la Reine associated with Henry III), Ghys arranged it for piano solo, with further arrangements for piano 4-hands, violin and piano as well as large orchestra. During Ghys' lifetime, editions appeared in solo arrangements for clarinet, flute, violin, mandolin etc. It remained a popular item in piano tuition until well into the twentieth century.

The 1888 volume of the Annuaire générale de la musique lists Ghys as a piano teacher and conductor of local brass bands in the towns of Louhans and Montret, both in the departments Saône-et-Loire.

Ghys died in Paris aged 69.

== Selected works ==
=== Piano music ===
Dates given are for publication, not necessarily for composition.

- Mélodie romantique, Op. 5 (1852)
- Air du Roi Louis XIII (1867)
- 1er Nocturne, Op. 10 (1869)
- Caprice Valse, Op. 11 (1869)
- Scherzo, Op. 12 (1869)
- 1er Mazurka, Op. 13 (1869)
- La Mouche. Polka, Op. 14 (1872)
- Le Chardon. Polka, Op. 15 (1872)
- Souvenir du Tréport, Op. 16 (1872)
- Impromptu, Op. 17 (1872)
- Chiffon. Valse, Op. 19 (1872)
- Air provençal (1873)
- Sérénade (1874)
- L'Appell. Polka (1875)
- Mazurka fantasque (1875)
- La Maréchaussée. Caprice-marche (1876)
- Six Pièces, Op. 26 (1879)
- Six Polonaises, Op. 27 (1882)
- A l'aventure. Vingt pièces (1885)
- La Fontanges. Gavotte (1885)
- Redowa fantaisiste (1886)
- Séduction. Valse-caprice (1887)
- Noël breton. Caprice (1890)
- 12 Préludes (1891)
- Menuet de la petite princesse (1892)
- Marquisette (1904)

=== Vocal music ===
- L'Apologie du parapluie. "Boutade" (words: Gusman Bette), for voice and piano (1880)
- Six Mélodies, for voice and piano (1904). Contains: Rondel (Robert de la Villehervé); Crépuscule (Villehervé); Calme plat (Villehervé); Mer furieuse (Villehervé); Berceuse (Baronne Coche de la Ferté); Printemps (Blanche Eckley).
