= Charles Lenepveu =

French composer and teacher

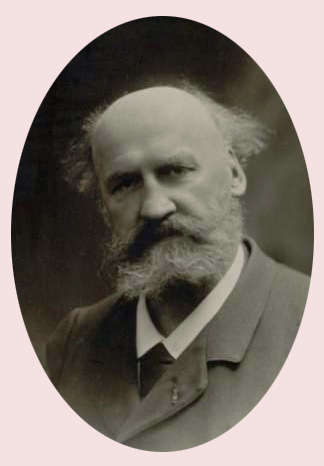
Lenepveu, 1890

Charles-Ferdinand Lenepveu (4 October 1840 – 16 August 1910), was a French composer and teacher. Destined for a career as a lawyer, he defied his family and followed a musical career. He studied at the Paris Conservatoire, and won France's top musical award, the Prix de Rome in 1867.

Much of Lenepveu's career was as a professor at the Conservatoire from 1880. He was known as a strict conservative, hostile to musical innovation, as was much of the French musical Establishment of the time. He was expected to succeed Théodore Dubois as director of the Conservatoire in 1905, but his chances evaporated when he was implicated in an attempt to rig the results of that year's Prix de Rome in favour of his own pupils.

== Life and career ==
=== Early years ===
Lenepveu was born in Rouen (Seine-Maritime), the son of Charles-François Lenepveu, a prominent lawyer, and his wife Marie-Françoise-Armande, née Petit. The young Lenepveu received a traditional education in his home town, while at the same time teaching himself musical theory and learning to play the violin.

Lenepveu senior was strongly opposed to his son's seeking a musical career and enrolled him at the Sorbonne Law School in Paris. Lenepveu was an outstanding student, and qualified to practise law in December 1862. During his time at the Sorbonne he had been taking lessons in music theory and harmony with Augustin Savard, professor at the Paris Conservatoire, and counterpoint and fugue with Charles-Alexis Chauvet, organist of Saint-Merri and Sainte-Trinité, Paris.

In 1862, Lenepveu won first prize in a competition with a cantata, which was performed in Caen. He decided to defy his father and abandon the law in favour of a career in music. In 1864, on Chauvet's recommendation, he was admitted to the Paris Conservatoire, where he studied composition under Ambroise Thomas. The following year he won France's most prestigious musical award, the Grand Prix de Rome, with his cantata Renaud in the Gardens of Armida to words by Camille du Locle. The Prize brought with it a two-year period of study at the French Academy in Rome, based at the Villa Medici. While there he successfully took part in a competition for dramatic composition; his three-act comic opera Le florentin, to a libretto by Henri de Saint-Georges. After much delay, and pressure from the composer, the piece was staged at the Opéra-Comique in Paris in February 1874. It was moderately successful there and achieved greater success in the provinces. Before the delayed presentation of Le florentin Lenepveu's Requiem Mass was performed at Notre-Dame de Bordeaux in 1871, won critical approval, and was given in Paris the following year.

=== Professor ===
In Paris Lenepveu taught private pupils and, in 1880, he was appointed to the faculty of the Conservatoire. When Ambroise Thomas died in 1896, Lenepveu was elected to succeed him as a member of the Académie des Beaux-Arts, beating his rival candidate, Gabriel Fauré, by nineteen votes to four. Fauré was thought by the conservative Académie members to be too innovative; Lenepveu's staunch traditionalism was more to their taste. At the same time as lecturing at the Conservatoire, Lenepveu remained active as a composer. Two one-act operas were completed but not staged. At the behest of its dedicatee, Adelina Patti, his four-act opera Velléda was presented at the Royal Opera House in London in 1883. The Times found the composer's melodies unoriginal and undistinguished but praised his skilful orchestration.

In 1905, Lenepveu was at the centre of what became known as "l'affaire Ravel". Maurice Ravel, who was widely recognised as a composer of outstanding talent and promise, was eliminated from that year's Prix de Rome. When it emerged that Lenepveu, who was on the jury, had contrived to exclude all but his own pupils from the finals, there was a public outcry. He was denounced by the leading critic Pierre Lalo as "a poor musician, author of a few worthless compositions; without ideas or art; but he is a member of the Institut". Théodore Dubois, the director of the Conservatoire, had already announced his forthcoming retirement and brought it forward in the wake of the scandal. Lenepveu, as a member of France's musical Establishment, had been expected to succeed him, but, seeking drastic reforms, the French government appointed Fauré over Lenepveu's head.

Lenepveu died at his home in Paris, at the age of 69. He was buried in his native Rouen.
