= Rapsodie espagnole =

Orchestral composition by Maurice Ravel

- by Maurice Ravel
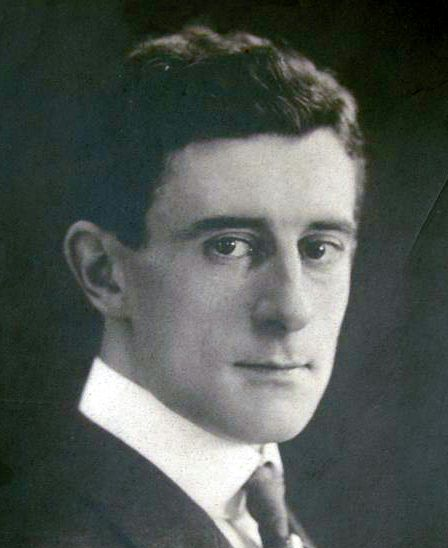
- Ravel in 1913
- English: Spanish Rhapsody
- Based on: Habanera
- Composed: 1907
- Performed: 15 March 1908
- Published: 1908
- Scoring: Orchestra

Rapsodie espagnole is an orchestral rhapsody written by Maurice Ravel. Composed between 1907 and 1908, the Rapsodie is one of Ravel's first major works for orchestra. It was first performed in Paris in 1908 and quickly entered the international repertoire. The piece draws on the composer's Spanish heritage and is one of several of his works set in or reflecting Spain.

== Background ==
The genesis of the Rapsodie was a Habanera, for two pianos, which Ravel wrote in 1895. It was not published as a separate piece, and in 1907 he composed three companion pieces. A two-piano version was completed by October of that year, and the suite was fully orchestrated the following February. At about this time there was a distinctly Spanish tone to Ravel's output, perhaps reflecting his own Spanish ancestry. His opera L'heure espagnole was completed in 1907, as was the song "Vocalise-Etude en forme de habanera".

In the interval between the composition of the original Habanera and the completion of the four-movement Rapsodie, Claude Debussy had published a piano suite, Estampes (1903), of which the middle section, "Soirée dans Grenade", had a Spanish theme. To counter any accusations of plagiarism, Ravel made certain that the date 1895 was clearly printed for his Habanera in the published score of the Rapsodie. (Note: If there was any plagiarism it was the other way about: after the first performance of the Habanera, Debussy had asked Ravel to lend him the score, and its influence can be clearly heard in Debussy's piece, "with its habanera rhythm and harmonies likewise clashing against an insistent C sharp", as the Ravel scholar Roger Nichols puts it.)

== Performance history ==
The première of the Rapsodie was given by the Orchestre des Concerts Colonne, conducted by Édouard Colonne, at the Théâtre du Châtelet on 15 March 1908. The critical reception was generally favourable. Dissenting voices were Pierre Lalo, who habitually disliked Ravel's music, and Gaston Carraud, who called the score "slender, inconsistent and fugitive". Otherwise there was much praise for the subtle and fresh orchestration and the picturesqueness of the music.

=== Subsequent performances ===
- Berlin, Germany: 17 December 1908, conducted by Hermann von Glenck
- Liège, Belgium: 14 March 1909, conducted by Jules Debefve
- London, United Kingdom: 21 October 1909, conducted by Henry Wood (Promenade Concerts)
- New York, United States: November 1909
- Geneva, Switzerland: 25 February 1911, conducted by Bernhard Stavenhagen at the Grand Théâtre de Genève
- Lyon, France: 19 March 1911, conducted by Georges Martin Witkowski

== Music ==
=== Instrumentation ===
The work is scored for an orchestra of 2 piccolos, 2 flutes, 2 oboes, cor anglais, 2 soprano clarinets, bass clarinet, 3 bassoons, sarrusophone (modern performances typically use a contrabassoon), 4 horns, 3 trumpets, 3 trombones, tuba, percussion (timpani, bass drum, cymbals, castanets, tambourine, gong, snare drum, and xylophone), celesta, 2 harps, and strings.

=== Structure ===
The Rapsodie has four movements:

1. Prélude à la nuit
2. Malagueña
3. Habanera
4. Feria

A complete performance typically lasts around 15 minutes.

=== I. Prélude à la nuit ===
The movement is marked très modéré; the time signature is 3/4 and the key is A major. The whole movement is quiet, never rising above mezzo forte; the strings are muted throughout. As in the String Quartet of three years earlier Ravel places themes in the opening movement that recur in subsequent sections, most particularly the insistent opening theme, F–E–D–C♯.

=== II. Malagueña ===
This is the shortest of the four movements, and is marked assez vif ("fairly lively"). Malagueña refers to a flamenco dance from the southern Spanish province of Málaga, but Ravel's music here has only the 3/4 meter in common with the authentic dance. The movement is instead what the critic Noël Goodwin calls "more a romantic evocation of place and mood". Like the first movement, it is in the key of A, though slightly ambiguous as to whether it is major or minor. The movement ends quietly with a repeat of the four note phrase that opens the first movement.

=== III. Habanera ===
The movement, in 2/4 and switching between F♯ major and minor, is marked assez lent et d'un rythme las ("rather slow and with a drowsy rhythm"). Goodwin describes it as "beguiling and subtle in its expression of a thoroughly Spanish character and spirit".

=== IV. Feria ===
Feria (Festival), in 6/8 and C major, is marked assez animé ("fairly lively"). It is the longest of the four movements and is the first point in the score at which Ravel, in Nichols's phrase, allows "the élan that has so far been deliberately stifled" to break out. The boisterous carnival atmosphere has undertones of nostalgia, but exuberance triumphs and the work ends in a joyful burst of orchestral colour.

== Sources ==
- Goodwin, Noël (1990). Notes to Chandos CD Chan 8850. Colchester: Chandos Records. OCLC 24272132.
- Nichols, Roger (2011). Ravel. New Haven, US and London: Yale University Press. ISBN 978-0-300-10882-8.
- Orenstein, Arbie (1991) [1975]. Ravel: Man and Musician. Mineola, US: Dover. ISBN 978-0-486-26633-6.
