= Pedro de Freitas Branco =

Portuguese conductor and composer

Pedro de Freitas Branco (1896–1963) was a Portuguese conductor and composer.

== Life and career ==
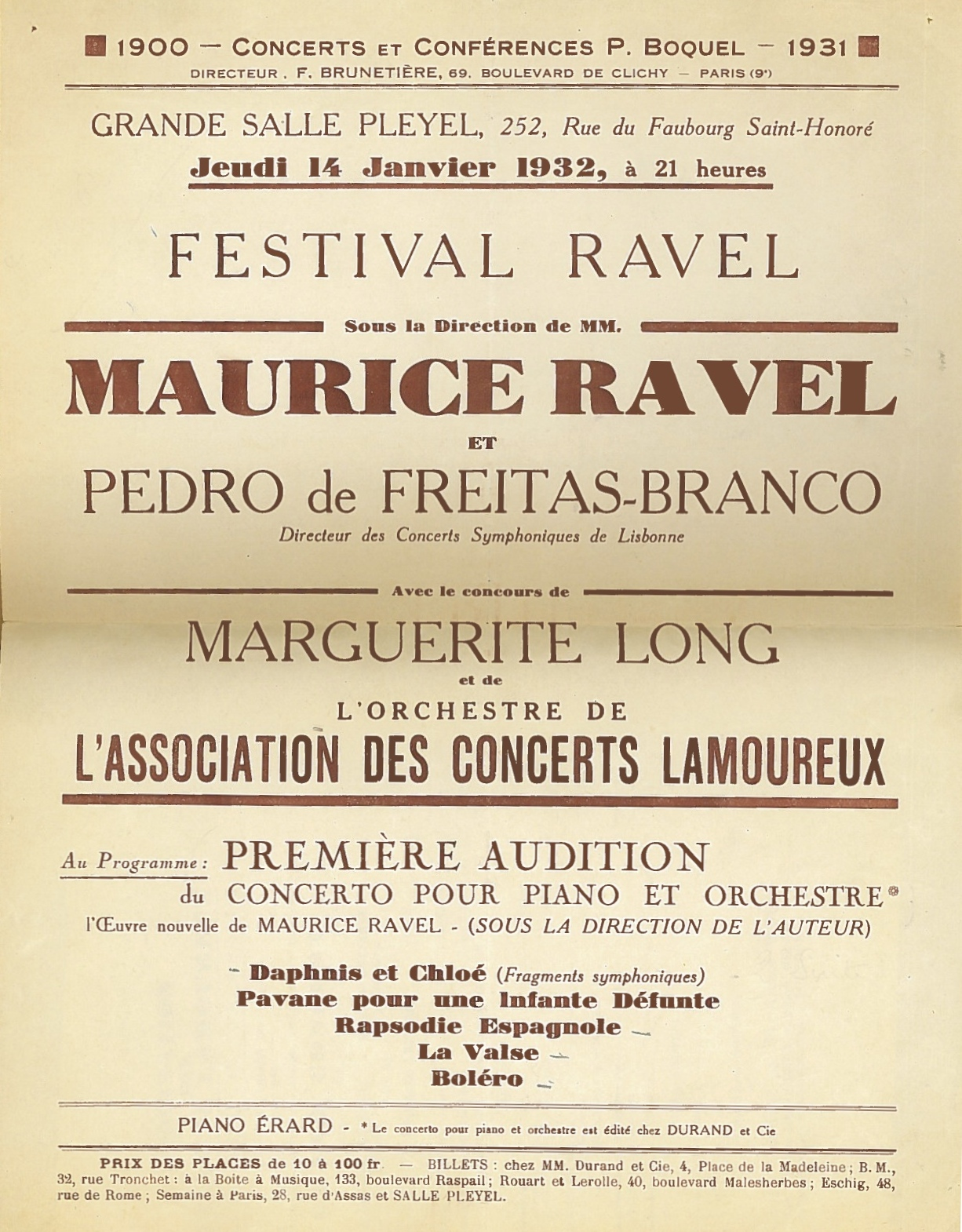

Branco was born in Lisbon, and studied music with Tomás Vaz de Borba and Luís de Freitas Branco (his elder brother). He founded the Portuguese Opera Company in 1926, and conducted the state symphony orchestra from 1934.

Branco made his Paris debut in 1932 in a concert of Maurice Ravel's music at the Salle Pleyel conducting Daphnis et Chloé, Pavane pour une infante defunte, Rapsodie espagnole, La valse and Boléro. At the same concert Ravel conducted the premiere of his G major Piano Concerto. He was not a good conductor, and when the concerto was recorded soon after the premiere, his name appeared as conductor on the label of the disc and in advertisements, but in fact Branco conducted the orchestra under Ravel's supervision at the recording sessions.

By the 1940s Branco was regarded as the leading conductor in Lisbon. In 1943 he conducted at the Venice Biennale. He guest conducted in several other European countries including France, Germany, Spain and Britain.

The singer Astra Desmond praised Branco for "his magnificent musicianship, his immersion in the spirit and style of whatever composer he is playing, his boundless enthusiasm and complete selflessness". The Times observed that he was at his finest in "music of great textual brilliance, notably in the work of Berlioz, Stravinsky and Richard Strauss.

== Death ==
Branco died in Lisbon in 1963, aged 66.

== Recordings ==
Recordings conducted by Branco include:

- Beethoven – Violin Concerto (David Oistrakh, soloist)
- Falla – El amor brujo
- Falla – El retablo de maese Pedro
- Falla – El sombrero de tres picos, Suite no. 2
- Hindemith – Overture Neues vom Tage
- Ravel – Alborada del gracioso
- Ravel – Boléro
- Ravel – La valse
- Ravel – Pavane pour une infante defunte
- Ravel – Piano Concerto in G major (Marguerite Long, soloist)
- Ravel – Valses nobles et sentimentales
- Roussel – Suite in F
- Schumann – Symphony No 2
- Stravinsky – The Rite of Spring
- Tchaikovsky – Violin Concerto (David Oistrakh, soloist)
- Vaughan Williams – Symphony No. 9
- Weber – Overture Der Freischütz

Source: WorldCat.

== References and sources ==
=== Sources ===
- Nichols, Roger (1987). Ravel Remembered. London: Faber and Faber. ISBN 978-0-571-14986-5.
- Orenstein, Arbie (2003) [1989]. A Ravel Reader. Mineola: Dover. ISBN 978-0-486-43078-2.
