= Ross Lee Finney =

American composer

Ross Lee Finney (December 23, 1906 – February 4, 1997) was an American composer who taught for many years at the University of Michigan.

== Life and career ==
Born in Wells, Minnesota, Finney received his early training at Carleton College and the University of Minnesota and also studied with Nadia Boulanger, Edward Burlingame Hill, Alban Berg (from 1931 to 1932) and Roger Sessions (in 1935). In 1928 he spent a year at Harvard University and then joined the faculty at Smith College, where he founded the Smith College Archives and conducted the Northampton Chamber Orchestra. In 1935, his setting of poems by Archibald MacLeish won the Connecticut Valley Prize, and in 1937, his First String Quartet received a Pulitzer Scholarship Award. A Guggenheim Fellowship funded travel in Europe in 1937. During World War II, Finney served in the Office of Strategic Services, and received a Purple Heart and a Certificate of Merit.

In 1948, following a second Guggenheim Fellowship, Finney joined the University of Michigan faculty. There he was the founder of the University of Michigan Electronic Music Studio in 1965 and composed the score for the sesquicentennial celebration of the University of Michigan in 1967. He retired in 1974.

Finney's works were presented at the 1965 Congregation of the Arts at the Hopkins Center of Dartmouth College, at the University of Kansas, the University of Southern California, and for the 1966 Festival of Contemporary Music at the University of Michigan at Ann Arbor. Finney collected many honors, including membership in the National Institute of Arts and Letters, honorary membership in Phi Beta Kappa and an honorary doctorate from Carleton College. His "Second Symphony" represented the United States at the 1963 Rostrum of International Composers at UNESCO headquarters at Paris.

According to the notes for the Composers Recordings, Inc. recording of Finney's Cello Sonata No. 2 (about 1953), Chromatic Fantasy In E for solo cello (1957) and Piano Trio No. 2 (1954), he received the Rome Prize in 1960 and the Brandeis Medal in 1968. He is quoted in those notes as having begun writing serial music from time to time beginning in 1950 with his String Quartet No. 6 (a work which uses serial principles but is "in E" on the score), his next composition after the sonata.

For his students See: List of music students by teacher: C to F#Ross Lee Finney.

Finney died on February 4, 1997, at his home in Carmel, California. He was 90.

== Music ==
He wrote eight string quartets, four symphonies as well as other orchestral works, other chamber works and songs. In his later years Finney composed a series of works exploring the nature and experience of memory, which combined serial organization as well as quotations of folk and popular music: Summer in Valley City (1969) for concert band; Two Acts for Three Players (1970) for clarinet, piano, and percussion; Landscapes Remembered (1971) for chamber orchestra; Spaces (1971) for orchestra; Variations on a Memory (1975) for chamber orchestra; and Skating Down the Sheyenne (1978) for band. Finney composed the dance scores Heyoka (1981), The Joshua Tree (1984), and Ahab (1986) for Erick Hawkins, and in 1984 completed his first opera, Weep Torn Land, to his own libretto.

== Selected worklist ==
- Concertos
  - For violin and orchestra (No. 1, 1933, revised 1952; No. 2, 1973)
  - For piano and orchestra (No. 1, 1948; No. 2, 1968)
  - For percussion and orchestra (1965) (Commissioned by Carleton College, to be performed by the Minnesota Orchestra.)
  - For alto saxophone and wind orchestra (1974)
- Orchestral works
  - Spaces (1971)
  - Four symphonies (1 "Communiqué 1943", 2, 3, 4)
  - "The Nun's Priest's Tale" (for solo voices, chorus and chamber orchestra) (1965)(Commissioned by the Hopkins Center at Dartmouth College)
- Chamber music
  - Eight string quartets (the 7th from 1955)
  - Three violin sonatas (1934 in C minor)
  - Two cello sonatas (no. 1 from 1941, number two in C published around 1953)
  - Six piano sonatas
  - Sonatas for viola (at least two, no. 1 published around 1937, no. 2 around 1971)
  - Piano trio in E minor (about 1930)
  - Piano quartet (1948)
  - 2 Piano quintets (second written 1961)
  - "Three Studies in Fours," for four percussionists, 48 percussion instruments (1965) (Commissioned by the U.S. Consul at Poznan)
  - String quintet (published 1966)
  - Quartet for oboe, violoncello, percussion and piano (1979)
- Song cycles
  - "A Cycle of Songs to Poems by Archibald MacLeish"
  - "Chamber music", to words by James Joyce
  - "Poor Richard," to words by Benjamin Franklin
  - "Three 17th Century Lyrics," to words by Henry Vaughan, William Shakespeare and John Milton
  - "Three Love Songs," to words by John Donne
  - "Still are New Worlds," to words by Johannes Kepler, William Harvey, Christopher Marlowe, John Donne, John Milton, Bernard Le Bovier de Fontenelle, Henry More, Mark Akenside, and Jean-Pierre Camus (1963) (Commissioned by the University Musical Society for the fiftieth anniversary of the opening of Hill Auditorium.
- Other
  - "Spherical Madrigals" (1947)
  - "Christmastime Sonata" (mid-1940s)
  - "Pilgrim Psalms" (mid-1940s)
  - "Organ Fantasies" (5)
  - "24 Inventions" (for piano)
  - "Variations on a Theme by Alban Berg" (for piano)(1952)

== Books ==
- 1947 - The Game of Harmony. New York: Harcourt, Brace.
- 1958 - Analysis and the Creative Process. Claremont, California: Scripps College.
- 1991 - Thinking about Music: The Collected Writings of Ross Lee Finney. Frederic Goossen, ed. Tuscaloosa: University of Alabama Press. ISBN 0-8173-0521-1
- 1992 - Profile of a Lifetime: A Musical Autobiography. New York: C.F. Peters. ISBN 0938856057

== Sources ==
- University of Michigan Record Obituary
- "Ross Lee Finney's Papers Finding Aid" (PDF). in the Music Division of The New York Public Library for the Performing Arts (includes guide to correspondence with Eugene Ormandy regarding premieres of symphonies 2 and 3, etc.)
- Ross Lee Finney collection sound and video recordings, 1938-1986. in the Rodgers and Hammerstein Archives of Recorded Sound of The New York Public Library for the Performing Arts. Contains information not found in the above PDF finding aid.
- Notes to a 1976 and 1981 recording of works by William Bolcom and Ross Lee Finney (available as a Google Cache)
- Kozinn, Allan. "Ross Finney, 90, Composer Of the Modern and Lyrical" New York Times (February 7, 1997)
