= Violin Sonata No. 2 (Ravel) =

Work for violin and piano by Maurice Ravel

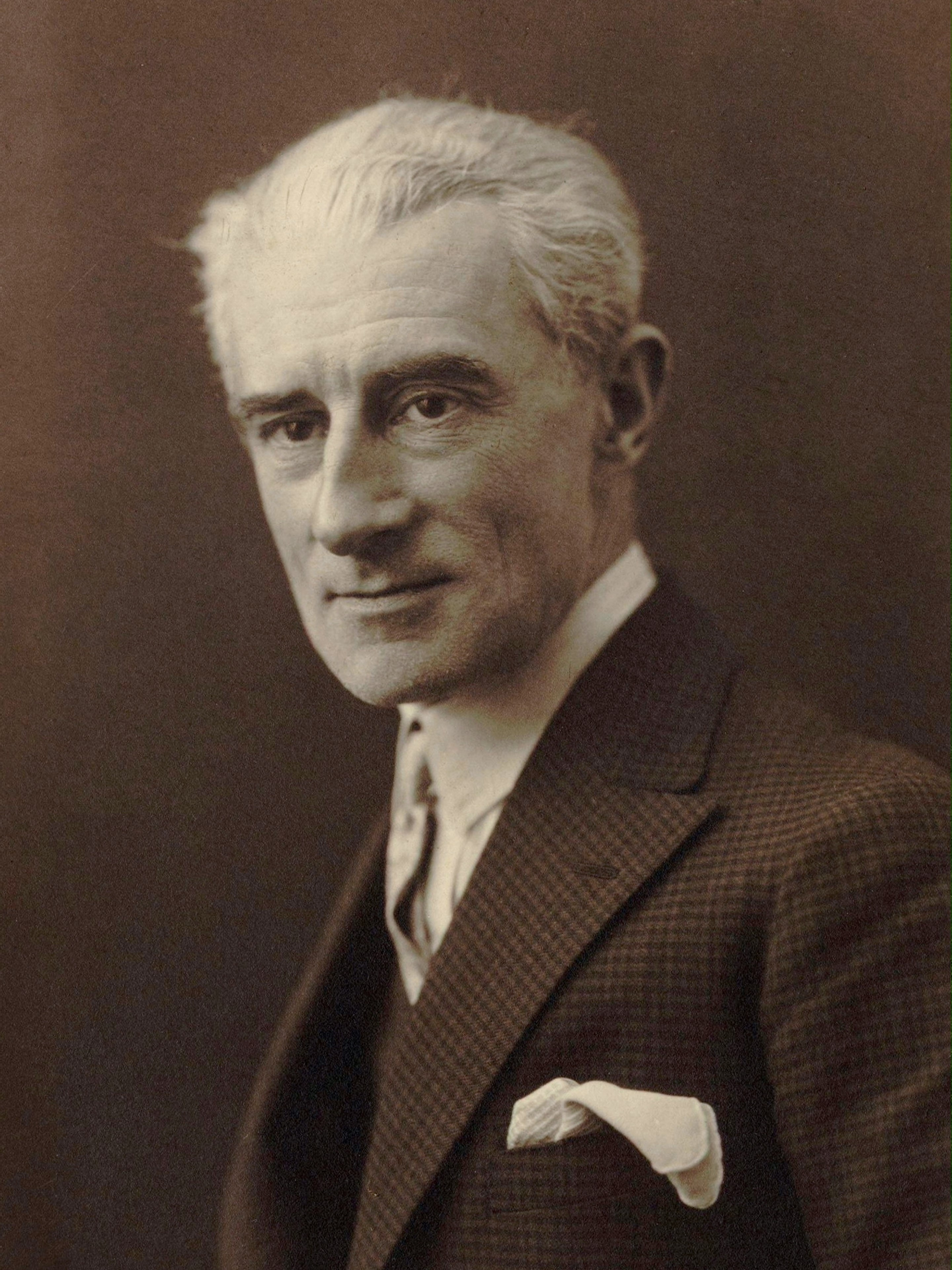
Ravel, 1925

Maurice Ravel's Violin and Piano Sonata No. 2 for violin and piano was composed from 1923 to 1927; it was inspired by forms of American music such as jazz and blues.

This work was the only violin and piano sonata published during Ravel's lifetime; the existence of the first violin sonata (Sonate posthume) only came to be known long after Ravel's death. For that reason this sonata was, and still often is called Ravel's "Violin Sonata" or "Violin and Piano Sonata" without numbering.

== Inspiration ==
When the composer was living in Montfort-l'Amaury, France, he accompanied Hélène Jourdan-Morhange, and they shared a love for jazz. The classic blues band of W. C. Handy exhibited the style of St. Louis blues in Paris from 1923 to 1927. Ravel was inspired by the style of music and dance, and jazz elements can also be found in the Piano Concerto for the Left Hand and other works.

== Movements ==
The violin and piano sonata consists of three movements:

1. Allegretto (G major)
2. Blues. Moderato (A♭ major)
3. Perpetuum mobile. Allegro (G major)
