= Paul Landormy =

French musicologist and music critic

Paul Charles-René Landormy (3 January 1869 in Issy-les-Moulineaux – 17 November 1943 in Paris) was a French musicologist and music critic.

== Biography ==
Paul Landormy was a fellow student of philosopher Émile Chartier at Lycée Michelet (Vanves) and École Normale Supérieure of Paris.

An agrégé of philosophy, he learned singing with Giovanni Sbriglia (Italian tenor) and Pol Plançon (French bass).

He organized, with Romain Rolland, a series of lectures on the history of music at the École des hautes études sociales (1902) where he created a laboratory of acoustics that he directed during three years (1904–1907).

In addition, he became music critic for La Victoire, Le Figaro, wrote articles for Le Temps and several magazines.

== Publications ==
- 1910: Histoire de la musique, on Gallica
- 1920: Brahms, revised edition 1948),
- 1928: La Vie de Schubert
- 1929: Bizet
- étude thématique sur le Faust de Gounod
- 1938: Albert Roussel
- 1941: Gluck
- 1942: Gounod
- 1943–1944: La musique française (3 volumes; de la Marseillaise à la mort de Berlioz, de Franck à Debussy, après Debussy.

== Sources ==
- Baker, Theodore; Slonimsky, Nicolas (1995). Dictionnaire biographique des musiciens, Baker's Biographical Dictionary of Musicians. Bouquins (in French). Translated by Marie-Stella Pâris. Paris: Robert Laffont. p. 2298. ISBN 2-221-06787-8.
