= Violin Sonata No. 1 (Ravel) =

Composition by Maurice Ravel

Sonate
- by Maurice Ravel
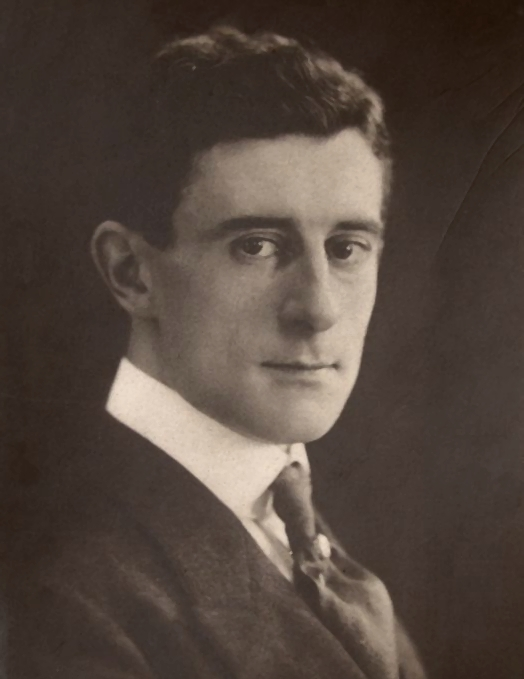
- Maurice Ravel in 1910
- Other name: Sonate posthume pour Violon et Piano
- Key: A minor
- Catalogue: M. 12
- Composed: April 1897
- Dedication: Likely Paul Oberdoerffer
- Published: 1975
- Scoring: violin; piano

The Violin and Piano Sonata No. 1 by Maurice Ravel, known also as Sonate posthume, is the composer's earliest instance of a sonata for this combination of instruments. Though it was composed 30 years before the publication of his second violin sonata, it was not published until 38 years after his death.

== Background ==
After being expelled from the Conservatoire de Paris in 1895 due to the ineptitude of his piano playing, he was eventually readmitted two years later to study counterpoint under André Gedalge and composition under Gabriel Fauré. The reason for the composition of the sonata is not entirely known; however it is believed that it was composed and performed for Fauré's composition classes.

The piece is a single movement lasting approximately 15 minutes.

There have also been transcriptions for double bass, viola, flute, or soprano saxophone as well as an orchestration of the accompaniment by Jorge Bosso.
