= Piano Concerto for the Left Hand (Ravel) =

Concerto by Maurice Ravel

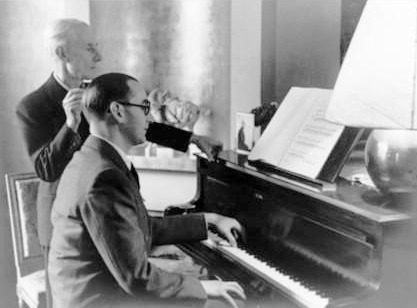
Maurice Ravel with Jacques Février playing the Piano Concerto for the Left Hand in Paris in 1937

The Piano Concerto for the Left Hand in D major was composed by Maurice Ravel between 1929 and 1930, concurrently with his Piano Concerto in G major. The piece was commissioned by Paul Wittgenstein, a concert pianist who had lost his right arm in the First World War.

== Composition and premiere ==
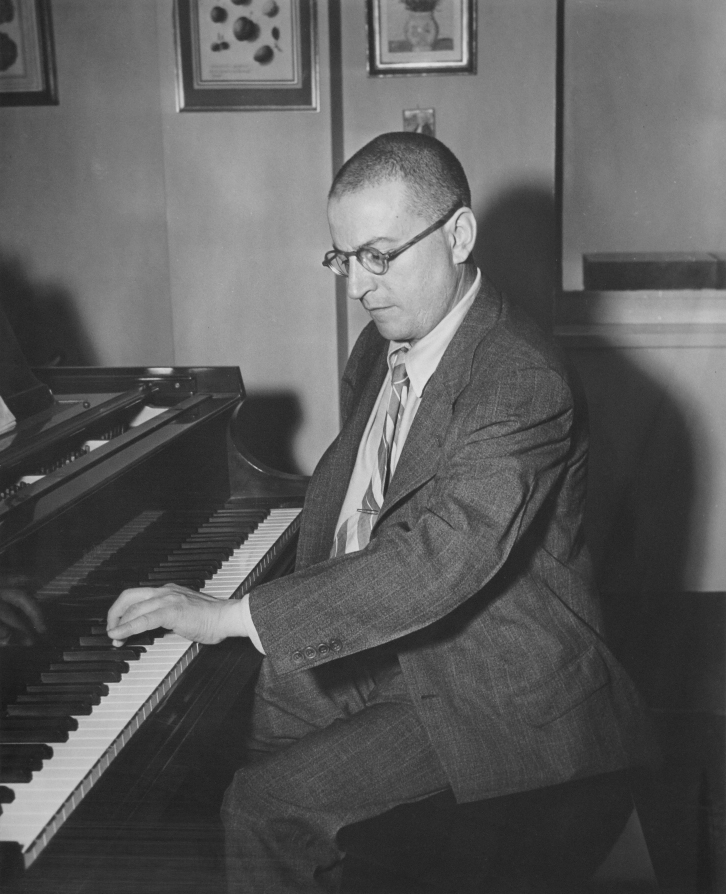
Paul Wittgenstein at the piano

In preparing for composition, Ravel studied several pieces written for one-handed piano, including Camille Saint-Saëns's Six Études pour la main gauche (Six Études for the Left Hand) (Op. 135), Leopold Godowsky's transcription for the left hand of Frédéric Chopin's Etudes (Opp. 10 and 25), Carl Czerny's Ecole de la main gauche (School of the Left Hand) (Op. 399), 24 études pour la main gauche (Op. 718), Charles-Valentin Alkan's Fantaisie in A♭ major (Op. 76 No. 1), and Alexander Scriabin's Prelude and Nocturne for the Left Hand (Op. 9).

Paul Wittgenstein gave the premiere with Robert Heger and the Vienna Symphony Orchestra on 5 January 1932; Ravel had first offered the premiere to Arturo Toscanini, who declined.

The first French pianist to perform the work was Jacques Février, chosen by Ravel.

== Structure ==
Ravel is quoted in one source as saying that the piece is in only one movement and in another as saying the piece is divided into two movements linked together. According to Marie-Noëlle Masson, the piece has a tripartite structure: slow–fast–slow, instead of the usual fast–slow–fast. Nevertheless, the major tempo markings are:

1. Lento ( = 44) – Andante ( = 60), in mainly 3/4 metre
2. Allegro ( = 138), in 6/8
3. Tempo 1º – Allegro

Whatever the internal structure may be, the 18–19 minute piece negotiates several sections in various tempi and keys (specifically modes) without pause. Towards the end of the piece, some of the music of the early slow sections is overlaid with the faster music, so that two tempi occur simultaneously.

The concerto begins with the double basses softly arpeggiating an ambiguous quartal harmony (E-A-D-G) being the background to an unusual solo of the contrabassoon. Although these notes are later given great structural weight, they are also the four open strings on the double bass, creating the illusion at the start that the orchestra is still tuning up. As is traditional in a concerto, the thematic material is presented first in the orchestra and then echoed by the piano. Not so traditional is the dramatic piano cadenza-like solo which first introduces the soloist and prefigures the piano's statement of the opening material. This material includes both an A and a B theme, though the B theme receives little exposure. An additional theme introduced at the beginning exhibits several similarities to the Dies irae chant.

An excerpt from the faster section, sometimes referenced as the scherzo, is shown in the following example.

Throughout the piece, Ravel creates ambiguity between triple and duple rhythms. This example highlights one of the more notable instances of this.

After the fast section, the tempo returns to that of the initial slow section and a sweeping piano glissando leads into the orchestra playing the first theme at fff, recalling the ending of the opening piano statement, while the pianist plays arpeggios and octave figures underneath. The music decrescendos into the piano cadenza filled with 64th-note runs. The orchestra eventually returns gradually and the concerto ends with a brilliant 5-bar Allegro section in the manner of the fast section.

The concerto is scored for a large orchestra consisting of 3 flutes (3rd doubling piccolo), 2 oboes, English horn, piccolo clarinet (in E♭), 2 clarinets (in A), bass clarinet (in A), 2 bassoons, contrabassoon, 4 horns in F, 3 trumpets in C, 3 trombones, tuba, timpani, triangle, snare drum, cymbals, bass drum, wood block, tam-tam, harp, strings, and the solo piano.

== Reception and legacy ==
Although at first Wittgenstein did not take to its jazz-influenced rhythms and harmonies, he grew to like the piece. When Ravel first heard him play the concerto at a private concert in the French embassy in Vienna, he was furious. 'He heard lines taken from the orchestral part and added to the solo, harmonies changed, parts added, bars cut and at the end a newly created series of great swirling arpeggios in the final cadenza. The composer was beside himself with indignation and disbelief.' Later Wittgenstein agreed to perform the concerto as written, and the two men made up their differences, 'but the whole episode left a bitter taste in both their mouths'.

In May 1930 Ravel had had a major disagreement with Arturo Toscanini over the correct tempo for Boléro (he conducted it too fast for Ravel's liking, who said he should play it at the slower speed he had in mind, or not at all). In September, Ravel patched up the relationship and invited Toscanini to conduct the world premiere of the Piano Concerto for the Left Hand, but the conductor declined.

Even before the premiere, in 1931 Alfred Cortot made an arrangement for piano two-hands and orchestra; however, Ravel did not approve of it and forbade its publication or performance. Cortot ignored this and played his arrangement, which caused Ravel to write to many conductors imploring them not to engage Cortot to play his concerto. After Ravel's death in 1937, Cortot resumed playing his arrangement, and even recorded it with Charles Munch leading the Paris Conservatoire Orchestra.

French classical pianist Roger Muraro performed the concerto during the 1986 International Tchaikovsky Competition. He placed fourth place in the competition.
