= Edward Burlingame Hill =

American composer (1872–1960)

Edward Burlingame Hill (September 9, 1872 in Cambridge, Massachusetts – July 9, 1960 in Francestown, New Hampshire) was an American composer.

== Career ==
After graduating from Harvard University in 1894, Hill studied music in Boston with John Knowles Paine, Frederick Field Bullard (de), Margaret Ruthven Lang, and George Elbridge Whiting, and in Paris with Charles Marie Widor. Finally, on his return to Boston, he pursued studies with George Whitefield Chadwick. He joined the Harvard faculty in 1908, remaining until his retirement in 1940. His later-famous pupils included Leonard Bernstein, Roger Sessions, Elliott Carter, Walter Piston, Ross Lee Finney and Virgil Thomson. Among a range of other works, Hill wrote four symphonies, four symphonic poems, two orchestral pantomimes, two orchestral suites, two piano concertos, one violin concerto, one cor anglais concerto, chamber music, jazz studies for two pianos, one choral ode, and one cantata.

He died in 1960 in Francestown, New Hampshire.

== Bibliography ==
- Hill, Edward Burlingame. Modern French Music, Boston and New York: Houghton Mifflin Co, 1924
