= Arbie Orenstein =

American pianist and musicologist

Arbie Orenstein (born 1937) is an American musicologist, author, academic and pianist, known as a scholar of the life and works of the composer Maurice Ravel and, more generally, as an expert on Jewish music.

== Life and career ==
Orenstein was born in New York and was educated at the High School of Music and Art, Queens College, and Columbia University, receiving a doctorate in musicology. He is known as a Ravel scholar, and his books include The Vocal Works of Maurice Ravel (1968), Ravel: Man and Musician (Columbia Univ. Press, 1975) and Ravel: Lettres, Ecrits, Entretiens (Flammarion, 1989), translated into English as A Ravel Reader (Columbia Univ. Press, 1990).

While working toward his doctoral dissertation he found and photographed 1100 pages of music manuscripts left by Ravel, including six previously lost pieces such as his Violin Sonata No. 1.

As a pianist, Orenstein has recorded the world premieres of works by Ravel. He has also accompanied concert artists. In 1998 the French government awarded him the medal of Chevalier of the Ordre des Arts et des Lettres.

Orenstein is a professor of music at the Aaron Copland School of Music at Queens College, where he has taught for 45 years, focusing on European music history and Jewish music. He is the editor of the Jewish music journal Musica Judaica and regularly contributes to the French journal Cahiers Maurice Ravel.
