= Pierre Lalo =

French music critic and translator (1866–1943)

Lalo in 1902

Pierre Lalo (6 September 1866 – 9 June 1943) was a French music critic and translator. He was the son of the composer Edouard Lalo. His reviews for the Parisian paper Le Temps combined conservatism and wit; among his principal targets was the composer Maurice Ravel, whose music Lalo disparaged throughout his career. In addition to his journalistic work Lalo served on the governing boards of the Paris Conservatoire and the national radio station Radiodiffusion.

== Life and career ==
Lalo was born in Puteaux, 8.7 kilometres (5.4 mi) west of central Paris. His father, Edouard Lalo, was a composer; his mother, Julie de Maligny, was a professional singer of Breton origin. He studied at the École polytechnique in Paris. He was a fine scholar, excelling in the study of literature, classics, philosophy and modern languages.

From 1896 Lalo contributed articles to the Journal des débats, and two years later he began a career as a music critic with an article in the Revue de Paris about Vincent d'Indy's new opera Fervaal. On the strength of that article he was appointed music critic of Le Temps, remaining in the post from 1898 to 1914. He also wrote for Le Courrier musical and Comoedia. Collections of his articles were published in volume form in 1920 (La musique: 1898–1899), 1933 (Richard Wagner ou le Nibelung), and posthumously in 1947 (De Rameau à Ravel: portraits et souvenirs).

Lalo's writing is described by Grove's Dictionary of Music and Musicians as characterised by "conservatism, wit, astuteness and a linguistic finesse which occasionally turned to virulence." One of his persistent themes was a dislike of the music of Ravel. Although a friend and trusted adviser of Ravel's teacher Fauré, Lalo gave poor notices to the young composer's early works, and continued to disparage him throughout his career. Lalo was less hostile to the music of Debussy, whose style of musical impressionism he preferred to Ravel's. (Note: Both composers were unhappy at the use of the term "impressionist" to typify their music, but Lalo's use of it was consistent with that of most contemporary music lovers.) When he detected what he thought was the influence of Ravel on Debussy's music, Lalo wrote, "By a strange phenomenon, the music of M. Debussy today reflects that of his own imitators. M. Ravel has been reproached (more than he should) for resembling M. Debussy, and now it's M. Debussy who starts to resemble M. Ravel." Lalo added that nonetheless he still preferred Debussy's music to Ravel's. His article "Maurice Ravel et le Debussysme" in Le temps in 1907 so stirred up factional opinion in the musical public that the harmonious relations between the two composers became strained.

Lalo was a member of the governing body of the Paris Conservatoire during Fauré's directorship, and later served on the board of the national broadcasting station Radiodiffusion. He died in Paris at the age of 76.

== Notes, references and sources ==
=== Sources ===
- Fulcher, Jane (2001). Debussy and his world. Princeton: Princeton University Press. ISBN 978-0-691-09041-2.
- Halford, Margery (2006). Debussy: An introduction to his piano music. Van Nuys: Alfred. ISBN 978-0-7390-3876-5.
- Nectoux, Jean-Michel (1991). Gabriel Fauré – A Musical Life. Roger Nichols (trans). Cambridge: Cambridge University Press. ISBN 978-0-521-23524-2.
- Nichols, Roger (2011). Ravel. New Haven and London: Yale University Press. ISBN 978-0-300-10882-8.
