= Swan Hennessy =

Irish-American composer in Paris

Edward Swan Hennessy (24 November 1866 – 26 October 1929) was an Irish-American composer and pianist who lived much of his life in Paris. In his pre-War piano music, he excelled as a miniaturist in descriptive, programmatic music. After joining a group of Breton composers, he developed a reputation as a "Celtic" composer, drawing on his Irish heritage, and writing in a style that was unique in a French as well as an Irish context. Even though he has been almost forgotten after 1950, his music was applauded by contemporary French music critics including Henri Collet, Louis Vuillemin, Émile Vuillermoz and Lucien Chevaillier. In some works, he used jazz elements and took inspiration from funfairs and industrial noise, anticipating trends associated with the group of "Les Six".

== Biography ==
Swan Hennessy was born in Rockford, Illinois, of Irish origin and grew up in Chicago. His father, Michael David Hennessy (1837–1919), was a Cork-born former President of the Chicago City Railway Company before he became a lawyer in 1874. Hennessy's mother was Sarah J. Swan (c.1833–1880), a daughter of Joseph Rockwell Swan, an Ohio Supreme Court judge and founding member of the American Republican Party. Before 1870 the family moved to Chicago, where Hennessy grew up. There is no proof for the assertion in Baker's Dictionary that he studied "general subjects" in Oxford, but he may briefly have attended one of the (private) public schools there, before pursuing musical studies in Germany at the Stuttgart Conservatory, 1879–86. Hennessy studied composition in an English-speaking class with the American teacher Percy Goetschius as well as piano with the German teacher Edmund Alwens.

Upon completing his studies, Hennessy moved to London (1886–92) where he was married with two children and divorced (1893). Ten years of travel followed, including France, Belgium, Switzerland, and Ireland, with a home base in Italy, before he settled in Paris around 1903. In July 1909, Hennessy was married with Claire, née Przybyszewska (1883–1947), a Polish national he had met in Brussels. Her mother was a cousin of the Symbolist writer Stanisław Przybyszewski. The couple's son Patrice Hennessy (1910–1973) later became a well-known man of letters and an expert on the French Revolution.

Although not from Brittany, Hennessy was a member of the short-lived Association des Compositeurs Breton before World War I and continued to mix with their members including Paul Le Flem, Paul Ladmirault, Maurice Duhamel, Louis Aubert, Louis Vuillemin, Lucien Haudebert and others throughout the 1920s. Hennessy's public recognition in France mainly began with his association. During the early 1920s, Hennessy also enjoyed a brief period when he had several performances in Ireland following the first performance of his String Quartet No. 2, Op. 49 (1920) at the January 1922 World Congress of the Irish Race in Paris. The quartet is dedicated to the memory of the Irish revolutionary Terence MacSwiney.

Hennessy died in 1929 from an embolic following a routine operation; the composer Georges Migot gave the funeral speech. Hennessy and his family are buried at Montparnasse Cemetery, Paris, division 28, section III.

== Music ==
Swan Hennessy's music before 1900 was heavily influenced by his conservative education and his teachers' predilection for the music of Robert Schumann. Around the time of his move to Paris, he also been an admirer of Max Reger. Although his later music shows the influence of several contemporary stylistic directions, he never shook off this profound influence of the German Romantics. During the period 1907 to 1913, Hennessy wrote increasingly in an Impressionist style, with a prolific series of piano works and art songs in a descriptive and programmatic style inspired by sounds in his environment including nature, traffic, and industry. He also excelled in humoristic and satirical pieces, similar to but independent from Satie. One contemporary critic wrote, "Il fut un humoriste d'une verve drue dont la drôlerie était faite à la fois d'observation et d'invention, de fantaisie et de psychologie." ("He was a humourist of great verve whose humour derived from observation and invention, fantasy and psychology"). However, despite favourable reviews in the French and German musical press, he initially did not succeed in having his music performed.

This changed only after his membership in the Association des Compositeurs Bretons from 1912 and the integration of elements from the traditional music of Ireland, Scotland and Brittany into his compositions. Interrupted by World War I (which he spent near Montreux in Switzerland), he developed his Celtic leanings especially during the 1920s. Many of Hennessy's pieces with titles ending on terms like "celtique", "gaélique" or "irlandais" are inspired by traditional folk melody and rhythms, but he rarely quotes actual folktunes. In the course of the 1920s he wrote most of his chamber music, including several duets, trios and quartets. These earned him the reputation of a "Celtic" composer to the extent that his original pre-War piano music became forgotten. In a French obituary, he was called "le barde de l'Irlande" and is credited as having saved "l'ancienne mélodie celtique".

Hennessy was very critical of the contemporary avant-garde, particularly of Arnold Schoenberg, and wrote numerous sarcastic and pessimistic letters and comments in the musical press. For him, a solution to what he perceived as a crisis was a turn to regional traditions of folk music and to incorporate these into works of art music.

From the time Hennessy lived in Paris, his music was largely published by E. Demets and from 1923 by Max Eschig (who had taken over Demets). Other publishers included Augener (London) and Schott (Mainz).

== Selected works ==
For a full list of compositions, see List of compositions by Swan Hennessy. Dates below are years of publication.

=== Chamber music ===
- Lieder an den Mond. Romantische Stücke, Op. 10, for violin, cello, piano (London: Augener & Co., 1888)
- Sonate en style irlandais, Op. 14, for violin and piano (London: Schott & Co., 1904; as Sonate en Fa (style irlandais): Mainz: B. Schott's Söhne, 1905)
- Prémier Quatuor (Suite) [String Quartet No. 1], Op. 46 (Paris: E. Demets, 1913)
- Deuxième Quatuor [String Quartet No. 2], Op. 49 (1920) (Paris: E. Demets, 1920)
- Rapsodie celtique, Op. 50, for violin and piano (Paris: E. Demets, 1915)
- Petit trio celtique, Op. 52, for violin, viola, cello (Paris: E. Demets, 1921)
- Trio, Op. 54, for two clarinets and bassoon (Paris: E. Demets, 1921)
- Variations sur un thème de six notes, Op. 58, for flute, violin, viola, cello (Paris: Max Eschig & Cie., 1924)
- Quatre Pièces celtiques, Op. 59, for cor anglais, violin, viola, cello (Paris: Max Eschig & Cie., 1925)
- Troisième Quatuor à cordes [String Quartet No. 3], Op. 61 (Paris: Max Eschig & Cie., 1926)
- Sonatine celtique, Op. 62, for viola and piano (Paris: Max Eschig & Cie., 1924)
- Rapsodie gaélique, Op. 63, for cello and piano (Paris: Max Eschig & Cie., 1925)
- Deux Morceaux, Op. 68, for alto saxophone and piano (Paris: Max Eschig & Cie., 1926)
- Trio, Op. 70, for flute, violin, bassoon (Paris: Max Eschig & Cie., 1926)
- Quatre Morceaux, Op. 71, for alto saxophone or viola (Op. 71bis) and piano (Paris: Éditions Max Eschig, 1929)
- Quatrième Quatuor à cordes [String Quartet No. 4], Op. 75 (Paris: Éditions Max Eschig, 1930)
- Deuxième Sonatine, Op. 80, for violin and piano (Paris: Propriété de l'auteur, 1929)
- Sonatine, Op. 81, for cello and piano (Paris: Propriété de l'auteur, 1929)

=== Piano music ===
- Variations sur un thème original dans le style irlandais, Op. 12 (London: Augener & Co. 1902; revised ed. as Variations on an Original Theme in the Irish Style, Augener & Co., 1903)
- Au bord de la forêt, Op. 21 (Paris: E. Demets, n.d. [1907])
- Étude, Op. 25 (Paris: E. Demets, 1907)
- Nouvelles feuilles d'album, Op. 27 (Paris: E. Demets, 1908)
- Variations sur un air irlandais ancien, Op. 28 (Mainz: B. Schott's Söhne, 1908)
- Croquis de femmes, Op. 33 (Paris: F. Durdilly, Ch. Hayet, successeur, 1911)
- Petite suite sur les notes Mi Do Mi Fa Si Mi, Op. 34 (Mainz: B. Schott's Söhne, 1911)
- Fêtes. Deux Morceaux descriptifs, Op. 36 (Mainz: B. Schott's Söhne, 1911)
- En passant ... (Études d'aprés nature), Op. 40 (Paris: E. Demets, 1912)
- Valses caprices, Op. 41 (Paris: E. Demets, 1912)
- Sonatine, Op. 43 (Paris: E. Demets, 1912)
- Sentes et chemins (Nouvelles études d'après nature), Op. 44 (Paris: E. Demets, 1912)
- Pièces celtiques, Op. 45 (Paris: E. Demets, 1912)
- Croquis parisiens, Op. 47 (Paris: E. Demets, 1913)
- Impressions humoristiques, Op. 48 (Paris: E. Demets, 1913)
- Sonatine celtique, Op. 53 (London: Evans & Co. 1924)
- Épigrammes d'un solitaire, Op. 55 (London: Evans & Co., 1924)
- Trois Pièces exotiques, Op. 57 (Paris: E. Demets, 1922)
- Étude de concert, Op. 60 (Paris: Max Eschig & Cie., 1924)
- Rapsodie irlandaise, Op. 67 (Paris: Éditions Max Eschig, 1929)
- Banlieues ... Six Petites pieces, Op. 69 (Paris: Max Eschig & Cie., 1929)
- À la manière de ..., 5 volumes (Paris: Éditions Max Eschig, 1927–8)

=== Voice and piano ===
- Lydia, Op. 23 (Charles Leconte de Lisle) (Paris: Julien Hamelle, 1908)
- Epiphanie, Op. 26 (José-Maria de Heredia) (Paris: Julien Hamelle, 1908)
- Deux Mélodies, Op. 30 (Joséphin Soulary, Charles Baudelaire) (Paris: Julien Hamelle, 1908)
- Trois Chansons écossaises, Op. 31 (Charles Leconte de Lisle) (Paris: Julien Hamelle, 1907)
- Trois Chansons espagnoles, Op. 42bis (Emmanuel von Geibel, Heinrich Heine) (Paris: E. Demets, 1921)
- Trois Mélodies, Op. 56 (Charles Baudelaire, Albert Samain, Jean Ajalbert) (Paris: Éditions Max Eschig, 1925–32)
- Trois Mélodies sur des poésies d'André Delacour et de Leconte de Lisle, Op. 66 (Paris: Max Eschig & Cie., 1926)
- Trois Chansons celtiques, Op. 72 (Charles Leconte de Lisle, Anatole le Braz, Pierre Scize) (Paris: Éditions Max Eschig, 1927)
- Deux Mélodies, Op. 73 (Paul Géraldy, Anatole le Braz) (Paris: Éditions Max Eschig, 1928)
- Deux Mélodies, Op. 79 (Paul Verlaine, Prosper Blanchemain) (Paris: Éditions Max Eschig, 1934)

== Bibliography ==
- Henri Collet, "La Musique chez soi – XCVII. Œuvres de Swan Hennessy", Comœdia, 5 December 1921, p. 4.
- Lucien Chevaillier: "Un Entretien avec Swan Hennessy", in: Le Guide du concert, 12 April 1929, p. 791–793, online here (accessed 13 January 2020).
- Guy Ferchault: "Hennessy, Swan", in: Die Musik in Geschichte und Gegenwart (MGG), first edition, ed. Friedrich Blume, vol. 6 (Kassel: Bärenreiter, 1957), cc. 152–153.
- Marjorie Brennan: 'Swan song for one of Cork's revolutionary heroes', in: "Irish Examiner", 31 October 2016, p. 16; online here.
- Axel Klein: "An Irish-American in Paris: Swan Hennessy (1866–1929)", in: Journal of the Society for Musicology in Ireland, vol. 13 (2017–18), pp. 47–78; online here (accessed 30 July 2018).
- Michael Dervan: "Swan Hennessy: Ireland's Great Lost Composer", in: The Irish Times, 27 March 2019.
- Axel Klein: Bird of Time. The Music of Swan Hennessy (Mainz: Schott Music, 2019); ISBN 978-3-95983-593-0 (hardcover), ISBN 978-3-95983-594-7 (paperback).
- A. Klein: "'L'indépendance n'est pas le meilleur chemin vers la gloire'. Une rétrospective de Swan Hennessy", in: Euterpe no. 36 (April 2021), pp. 8–16.
- A. Klein: "Swan Hennessy: Eine Suche nach der verlorenen Zeit", in: Piano News vol. 26 (2022) no. 1 (Jan.–Feb.), pp. 24–28.
- Harry White: "25 January 1922: Premiere of Swan Hennessy's Second String Quartet, Paris. Art Music and the Struggle for Independence", in: Ireland 1922. Independence, Partition, Civil War, ed. Darragh Gannon and Fearghal McGarry (Dublin: Royal Irish Academy, 2022), pp. 33–39.

== Recordings ==
- Quatre Pièces celtiques, Op. 59, in an arrangement for cor anglais and organ, performed by Manfred Hoth (cor anglais) and Ulrich Leykam (organ), on: K&M Records, CD [undated].
- Trio, Op. 54 for two clarinets and bassoon, performed by Trio d'Ance di Bolzano, on: Rainbow RW 98107, CD (1999).
- Quatre Pièces celtiques, Op. 59, in an arrangement for cor anglais and string orchestra, performed by Rachel Tolmie (cor anglais), Bourbaki Ensemble, on: Wirripang Wirr 018, CD (2008).
- Trio, Op. 54 for two clarinets and bassoon, performed by Trio Pleyel, on: bremenradiohall records brh cd 1305, CD and downloads (2013).
- Complete String Quartets 1–4, performed by RTÉ ConTempo Quartet, on: RTÉ lyric fm CD 159, CD (2019). Contains: String Quartet No. 1 (Suite), Op. 46; No. 2, Op. 49; No. 3, Op. 61; No. 4, Op. 75; Sérénade, Op. 65; Petit trio celtique, Op. 52.
- Selected Works for Piano, performed by Moritz Ernst, on: Perfect Noise PN 2006, CD (2020). Contains: Au bord de la forêt, Op. 21; Croquis de femmes, Op. 33; Fêtes, Op. 36; En passant ... (Études d'aprés nature), Op. 40; Valses caprices, Op. 41; Sonatine, Op. 43; Pièces celtiques, Op. 45; Croquis parisiens, Op. 47; Banlieues ..., Op. 69; four excerpts from À la manière de ...: Borodine, Chabrier, Debussy–Godard, Ravel.
- Viola and Piano Works 1, performed by Marcin Murawski (viola) and Anna Starzec-Makandasis (piano), on Acte Préalable AP 490 (CD, 2020). Contains: Berceuse, Op. 13; Au village, Op. 22; Valses caprices, Op. 41; Rapsodie celtique, Op. 50; Sonatine celtique, Op. 62; Deux Morceaux, Op. 68; Pièce celtique, Op. 74.
- Viola and Piano Works 2, performed by Marcin Murawski (viola) and Hanna Holeksa (piano), on Acte Préalable AP 524 (CD, 2021). Contains: Sonate en style irlandais, Op. 14; Mazurka et Polonaise, Op. 17; Étude, Op. 25; Rapsodie gaélique, Op. 63; Quatre Morceaux, Op. 71; Deuxième Sonatine, Op. 80; Sonatine, Op. 81; À la manière de Frédéric Chopin.
