= List of compositions by Swan Hennessy =

This is a list of compositions by Swan Hennessy (1866–1929).

Hennessy was an American composer of Irish family background who studied in Germany, lived in England and Italy, but spent most of his career (from about 1903) in France.

He was a most accomplished composer of chamber music in many diverse instrumentations and of piano music. The following is a list of compositions in a table sorted by opus number. This is followed by a list sorted by genre.

== List of compositions by opus number ==
The following table shows a chronological list, based on Klein (2019). Dates given are for publication, not composition.

Genre	Opus	Date	Title	Scoring	Notes
Piano	1	1885	Ländliche Skizzen: 1. Am Bache; 2. Waldvöglein; 3. Ländler; 4. Ringellied; 5. Legende; 6. Die Sägemühle	piano	Published Leipzig: Breitkopf & Härtel, plate no. 17120 (without opus number). Dedication: "Seinem Freund und Lehrer Herrn Professor Percy Goetschius gewidmet".
Piano	2	1886	Ein Spinnerliedchen	piano	Published Stuttgart: G. A. Zumsteeg, plate no. G.A.Z. 564.
Vocal	3	1886	Vier Lieder: 1. Leise zieht durch mein Gemüth; 2. Die blauen Frühlingsaugen; 3. Mädchen mit dem rothen Mündchen; 4. Zum Schluss: „Sag, wo ist dein schönes Liebchen“	voice and piano	Words by Heinrich Heine. Published Stuttgart: G. A. Zumsteeg, plate no. G.A.Z. 562. Dedication: "Fräulein Lucy Roper gewidmet".
Piano	4	1890	Two Studies: Staccato and Legato	piano	Published London: Augener & Co., revised edition, 1902. No. 2 also published New York: G. Schirmer (1890), plate no. 7241; also in The Monthly Musical Record vol. 22 no. 253 (January 1892), pp. 11–14.
Vocal	5	1887	The Blackbird Has a Golden Bill	mezzo-soprano and piano	Words by the composer; designated as "Op. 5 No. 1", but no other numbers are extant. Published Stuttgart: G. A. Zumsteeg, plate no. G.A.Z. 587. Dedication: "To Miss I. C. Ross".
Piano	6	1886, 1887	Carneval-Studien	piano	Vol. 1 published Stuttgart: G. A. Zumsteeg, plate no. G.A.Z. 591 (1886); vol. 2 ibid., plate no. G.A.Z. 617 (1887). Dedication: "Seinem Freunde Herrn Ernest Longley gewidmet".
Piano	7	1887	Im Gebirg (In the Mountains), 4 Klavierstücke: 1. Mittagsstille (Noon); 2. Zwiegespräch (Canon); 3. Abendnähe (Twilight); 4. Träumerei (Dreaming)	piano	Published London: Augener & Co., plate no. 7671. Dedication: "An Herrn Theodor Kirchner".
Piano	8	1887	Albumblätter (Album Leaves)	piano	Published London: Augener & Co., plate no. 7672. Dedication: "To Frau Clara Schumann".
Piano	9	1888	Étude-Fantaisie	piano	Published London: Augener & Co., plate no. 7902.
Chamber	10	1888	Lieder an den Mond, Romantische Stücke: 1. Um Mitternacht; 2. In der Frühe; 3. Am Abend	violin, cello and piano	Published London: Augener & Co., plate no. 7942.
Piano	11	1889	Miniatures, Cinq petites pièces	piano	Published Paris: Durand & Schoenewerk, plate no. D.S. 4043. Dedications: 1. "à Lucie"; 2. "à Lambert Zegers Veeckens"; 3. "à Miss Katie Lewis"; 4. à Gretchen Goetschius"; 5. "à William T. Scott Barber".
Piano	12	1902	Variations sur un thème original dans le style irlandais (Variations on an Original Theme in the Irish Style)	piano	Published London: Augener & Co., plate no. 1287; revised edition, ibid. (1903), plate no. 1287α. Dedication: "To Miss Carrie Townshend".
Chamber	13	1901	Berceuse	violin and piano	Published Paris: Enoch & Cie., plate no. E. & C. 4658. Dedication: "à Madame Béatrice Langley".
Chamber	14	1904	Sonate en fa (style irlandais)	violin and piano	Published London: Schott & Co., plate no. 27497; second edition: Mainz: B. Schott's Söhne, n. d. [1905], same plate no. Dedication: "à son ami A. Simonetti".
Piano	15	1906	Deux Études pour la main gauche seul	piano	Published Paris: J. Hamelle, plate no. J. 5405 H.
Piano	16	1906	Praeludium & Fuga	piano	Published Paris: J. Hamelle, plate no. J. 5340 H.
Piano	17	1906	Mazurka et Polonaise	piano	Published London: Augener & Co., plate no. 1360α. Dedication: "à Mlle. Claire Przybyszewska".
Piano	18	1907	Petit album: 1. En route (On the Road); 2. L'Auberge (The Inn); 3. Enfants qui passent (Passing Children); 4. Aux temps passés (From Old Times); 5. Danseuse sur la scène (Ballet Girl on the Stage); 6. Sonatine; 7. Scherzetto	piano	Published London: Schott & Co., plate no. 27919.
Piano	19	1905	Aus dem Kinderleben, 6 kleine Tonbilder (Scenes from Child Life): 1. Puppenwiegenlied (The Doll's Cradle Song); 2. Puppentanz (The Doll's Dance); 3. Im Wald (In the Wood); 4. Erster Walzer (The First Waltz); 5. Schläfriges Kind (The Sleepy Child); 6. Auf Wiedersehen (Goodbye)	piano	Published Leipzig: Breitkopf & Härtel, plate no. 24931.
Chamber	20	(c. 1905)	Tarantelle	violin and piano	Unpublished.
Piano	21	1907	Au bord de la forêt	piano	Published Paris: E. Demets, plate no. E. 1267 D. Dedication: "à Mademoiselle Claire Przybyszewska".
Piano	22	1907	Au village, Petite suite charactéristique: 1. Noce campagnarde 2. Fillettes; 3. Basse-cour; 4. Sur l'herbe 5. Au bord du Ruisseau	piano	Published (without opus number) Paris: E. Demets, plate nos E. 1293 D. to E. 1297 D. Dedication: "à Max Reger".
Vocal	23	1906	Lydia	high voice and string quartet (w/ version for piano)	Words by Leconte de Lisle. String quartet original unpublished. Piano version published Paris: J. Hamelle, plate no. J. 5489 H.; second edition as no. 1 of Quatre Mélodies (1908), same plate no., see below; third edition Paris: E. Demets (1913), plate no. E. 1244 D. Dedication: "à mon ami Hugo Rasch".
Piano	24	1908	Eaux fortes: 1. Sérénade espagnole 2. Bergérie; 3. Petite mazurka	piano	Published Paris: E. Demets, plate no. E. 1387 D.
Piano	25	1907	Étude	piano	Published Paris: E. Demets, plate no. E. 1271 D. Dedication: "A Monsieur E. Demets".
Vocal	26	1907	Épiphanie	high voice and piano or organ	Words by José-Maria de Heredia. Published Paris: J. Hamelle, plate no. J. 5501 H.; second edition as no. 2 of Quatre Mélodies (1908), same plate no., see below; third edition Paris: E. Demets (1913), plate no. E. 1245 D. Dedication: "à Mademoiselle Marie Stark".
Vocal		1907	Annie, Chanson écossaise	high voice and piano	Words by Leconte de Lisle. Published Paris: J. Hamelle, plate no. J. 5505 H.; second edition Paris: E. Demets, plate no. E. 1286 D. (1907); also as music supplement to La Revue musicale no. 52 (1911); later listed as no. 1 of Trois Chansons écossaises, Op. 31 (no collective print). Dedication: "à son ami Hugo Rasch" (Demets edition only).
Piano	27	1908	Nouvelles feuilles d'album: 1. Madrigal; 2. Canon; 3. Style irlandais 4. Petites scènes parisiennes: A. Montrouge le matin, B. Sortie de midinettes	piano	Published Paris: E. Demets, plate no. E. 1346 D. Dedication: "À mon ami Auguste Delacroix".
Piano	28	1908	Variations sur un air irlandais ancien	piano	Published Mainz: B. Schott's Söhne, plate no. 28388.
Piano	29	1909	Petite suite irlandaise d'après des airs anciens de la collection Petrie (Bláithfhleasg bheag d'fhonnaibh Arsa Gaedhealacha as leabhar Petrie): 1. Ancient Clan March; 2. Cork Reel; 3. Sagairt tar teorach 4. Cork Reel	piano 4-hands	Published (without opus number) Paris: E. Demets, plate no. E. 1409 D.; material taken from the Petrie Collection of Irish Music, compiled by George Petrie and edited by Charles V. Stanford
Vocal	30	1907	Deux Mélodies: 1. Là-Bas!; 2. Le Revenant!	voice and piano	1. Words by Joséphin Soulary; 2. words by Charles Baudelaire; Published (without opus number) Paris: E. Demets, plate nos E. 1246 D. and E. 1247 D.; second editions as nos 3 and 4 of Quatre Mélodies (1908), see below. Dedications: 1. "à mon Ami Gino Sartoni", 2. [no dedication].
Vocal	23, 26, 30	1908	Quatre Mélodies: 1. Lydia; 2. Épiphanie; 3. Là-bas!; 4. Le Revenant	voice and piano	1. words by Leconte de Lisle; 2. words by José-Maria de Heredia; 3. words by Joséphin Soulary; 4. words by Charles Baudelaire; Published Paris: J. Hamelle, plate nos J. 5489 H.; J. 5501 H.; J. 5506 H.; J. 5656 H.
Vocal	31	1907	Trois Chansons écossaises: 1. Annie; 2. La Fille aux cheveux de lin 3. Nell	high voice and piano	Words by Leconte de Lisle. No collective print; no. 1 (Annie), see above; no. 2 published Paris: E. Demets (1920), plate no. E. 2006 D.; no. 3 published Paris: E. Demets (1922), plate no. E. 2037 D. Dedications: 1. "à son ami Hugo Rasch"; 2. "à Madame Delorme Jules Simon"; 3. "à Charles Hubbard".
Piano	32	1909	Valses: 1. [no descriptive title]; 2. Espagne; 3. Suisse; 4. [no descriptive title]	piano	Published Paris: E. Demets, plate no. E. 1448 D. Dedication: "à Mlle. Claire Przybyszewska".
Piano	33	1911	Croquis de femmes: 1. Au couvent 2. Bavardes; 3. La Vieille tante 4. Mondaine; 5. Jeunes anglaises 6. Charmeuse de serpents 7. Dans les jardins du sérail	piano	Published Paris: F. Durdilly, Ch. Hayet, successeur, plate no. C. 6254 H. Dedication: "à Monsieur Jules Combarieu, Hommage sympathique et reconnaissant".
Piano	34	1911	Petite suite sur les notes Mi Do Mi Fa Si Mi	piano	Published Mainz: B. Schott's Söhne, plate no. 29378. Dedication: "à mon cher ami E. Demets".
Piano	35	1910	Kinder-Album, 24 kleine Präludien in verschiedenen Ton- und Taktarten	piano	Published Mainz: B. Schott's Söhne, plate no. 28824. Dedication: "Meinem lieben Vater gewidmet".
Piano	36	1911	Fêtes, 2 Morceaux descriptifs: 1. Fête de village au XVIII^{me} siècle 2. Fête populaire dans la banlieue de Paris au XX^{me} siècle	piano	Published Mainz: B. Schott's Söhne, plate no. 29379. Dedication: "à Madame Betty Heffner, Hommage sympathique".
Piano	37	1913	Les Noces du soldat de bois, Ballet en un acte	piano	Unpublished.
Piano	38	1910	Introduction, XII variations et fugue	piano	collaborative publication with works on the same theme by Hugo Rasch, Georges Loth, Auguste Delacroix, and Herbert Fryer, Paris: E. Demets, plate no. E. 1487 D. Dedication: "à mon ami Hugo Rasch".
Piano	39	1912	Incunabula: 1. Berceuse; 2. Bébé dort 3. Croquemitaine	piano	Published Paris: E. Demets, plate no. E. 1614 D. Dedication: "à Tupac".
Piano	40	1912	En passant ... Études d'après nature: 1. Petit pâtre sur les hauts pâturages 2. Champs de blé au clair de lune 3. Dans une petite ville flamande le dimanche 4. Cîmes neigeuses 5. Sieste en chemin de fer	piano	Published Paris: E. Demets, plate no. E. 1615 D.
Piano	41	1912	Valses caprices: 1. Valse rustique 2. Valse canaille 3. Valse distraite 4. Valse boîteuse 5. Valse érotique 6. À la Reger; 7. Encore une valse	piano	Published Paris: E. Demets, plate no. E. 1664 D.
Piano	42	1912	Gitaneries: 1. Carmen; 2. Mercédès; 3. Jacinta; 4. Manuelita	piano	Published Paris: E. Demets, plate no. E. 1678 D. Dedication: "à la mémoire de Bizet".
Vocal	42bis	1921	Trois Chansons espagnoles: 1. Fluthenreicher Ebro (Sur les rives fleuries); 2. Auf den Wällen Salamankas (Sur les murs de Salamanque); 3. Neben mir wohnt Don Henriquez (Mon voisin est Don Henriquez)	voice and string quartet (w/ version for piano)	French words by the composer after Emanuel von Geibel and Heinrich Heine; 2.~3. words by Heinrich Heine. Published Paris: E. Demets, plate no. E. 2083 D. Dedication: "à Mademoiselle Radiana Pazmor"
Piano	43	1912	Sonatine	piano	Published Paris: E. Demets, plate no. E. 1674 D. Dedication: "à mon ami Heinrich Möller".
Piano	44	1912	Sentes et chemins, Nouvelles études d'après nature: 1. Ouvriers allant à l'usine 2. Promenade du philosophe 3. À travers bois 4. Cornemuse en tête 5. Sur la route d'Amalfi; 6. Sentier de Meudon au printemps 7. Par la pluie	piano	Published Paris: E. Demets, plate no. E. 1726 D. Dedication: "À mon Père".
Piano	45	1912	Pièces celtiques	piano	Published Paris: E. Demets, plate no. E. 1727 D.
Chamber	46	1913	Suite [String Quartet No. 1]	2 violins, viola and cello	Published Paris: E. Demets, plate no. E. 1784 D. Dedication: "à Monsieur le Professeur Carl Heffner".
Piano	46bis	1912	Adagio et allegretto du quatuor à cordes	piano	Transcription by the composer from the Suite, Op. 46; Published Paris: E. Demets, plate no. E. 1732 D.
Piano	47	1913	Croquis parisiens: 1. Promenade matinale au jardin du Luxembourg; 2. L'Américain qui a bien diné 3. Dans un atelier de couturières	piano	Published Paris: E. Demets, plate no. E. 1747 D. Dedication: "à Louis Vuillemin".
Piano	48	1913	Impressions humoristiques: 1. Dédicace: Aux amis de Russie; 2. Tupac–Polka; 3. Das Fräulein stand am Meere und seufzte lang und bang 4. Napolitains; 5. En regardant une ronde de jeunes filles 6. Chanteuse de Beuglant; 7. Bébé prend sa médecine	piano	Published Paris: E. Demets, plate no. E. 1794 D.
Chamber	49	1920	Deuxième quatuor [String Quartet No. 2]	2 violins, viola and cello	Published Paris: E. Demets, plate no. E. 1994 D. Dedication: "à la Mémoire de Terence McSwiney, Lord Mayor de Cork".
Chamber	50	1915	Rhapsodie celtique	violin and piano	Published Paris: E. Demets, plate no. E. 1825 D.
Piano	51	1924	Eight Celtic Pieces / Huit Pièces celtiques	piano	Published (with English title) London: Evans & Co., plate no. S. & Co. 31; second edition (with French title) as part of the Album celtique Paris: Max Eschig & Cie. (1929), plate no. M.E. 2320. Dedication: "To Denis Breen".
Chamber	52	1921	Petit trio celtique	violin, viola and cello	Published Paris: E. Demets, plate no. E. 2002 D. Dedication: "à mon ami Paul Le Flem".
Piano	53	1924	Sonatine celtique	piano	Published London: Evans & Co., plate no. S. & Co. 41; second edition as part of the Album celtique Paris: Max Eschig & Cie. (1929), plate no. M.E. 2321. Dedication: "à Lucien Haudebert".
Chamber	54	1921	Trio	2 clarinets and bassoon	Paris: E. Demets, plate no. E. 2001 D. Dedication: "à mon ami Paul Ladmirault".
Piano	55	1924	Épigrammes d'un solitaire: 1. La Forêt de Clamart à l'aube 2. Un Jardin arabe 3. Une Pagode indochinoise 4. Un Berceau; 5. Un Vieux cimetière 6. Un Souvenir lointain	piano	Published London: Evans & Co., plate no. S. & Co. 40; second edition Paris: Max Eschig & Cie. (1929), plate no. M.E. 2322. Dedication: "à Michael Kavanagh".
Vocal	56	1925, 1932	Trois Mélodies: 1. Le Mort joyeux 2. Les Grands jasmins épanouis 3. Il était une fois	low voice and piano	1. Words by Charles Baudelaire; 2. words by Albert Samain; 3. words by Jean Ajalbert; Publication(s): 1. Paris: Éditions Max Eschig (1932), plate no. M.E. 3692; 2. Paris: Max Eschig & Cie. (1925), plate no. M.E. 1564; 3. Paris: Éditions Max Eschig (1932), plate no. M.E. 3693. Dedications: 1. "à Jean Suscinio"; 2. "à Charles Hubbard"; 3. "à Marcelle Gerar".
Piano	57	1924	Trois Pièces exotiques: 1. Fillettes brunes 2. Le Goût de la cannelle 3. Nègre endimanché	piano	Published Paris: E. Demets, plate no. E. 2070 D.
Chamber	58	1924	Variations sur un thème de six notes (H.B., E.B., C.H.)	flute, violin, viola and cello	Published Paris: Max Eschig & Cie., plate no. M.E. 1315.
Chamber	59	1925	Quatre Pièces celtiques	English horn, violin, viola and cello	Published Paris: Max Eschig & Cie., plate no. M.E. 1430. Dedication: "à M. Paul Brun".
Piano	60	1924	Étude de concert	piano	Published Paris: Max Eschig & Cie., plate no. M.E. 1262. Dedication: "à Mademoiselle Rachel Blanquer".
Chamber	61	1926	Troisième quatuor [String Quartet No. 3]	2 violins, viola and cello	Published Paris: Max Eschig & Cie., plate no. M.E. 1719. Dedications for the four movements: 1. "à Emile Loiseau"; 2. "à Adrien Fourment"; 3. "à Robert Chantôme"; 4. "à Robert Ladoux".
Chamber	62	1924	Sonatine celtique	viola (or violin) and piano	"Sonate celtique" on title page, "Sonatine celtique" (= correct) on first page. Published Paris: Max Eschig & Cie., plate no. M.E. 1425. Dedication: "à Robert Chantôme".
Chamber	63	1925	Rapsodie gaélique	cello and piano	Published Paris: Max Eschig & Cie., plate no. M.E. 1447. Dedication: "à Francis Touche".
Piano	64	1926	Douze Canons à deux voix à tous les intervalles	piano	Published Paris: Max Eschig & Cie., plate no. M.E. 1563. Dedication: "à ma femme".
Chamber	65	1925	Sérénade	2 violins, viola and cello	Published Paris: Max Eschig & Cie., plate no. M.E. 1525. Dedication: "à Emile Loiseau".
Vocal	66	1925	Trois Mélodies sur des poésies d'André Delacour et de Leconte de Lisle: 1. Si la distance qui nous sépare 2. Paysage; 3. Chanson écossaise	voice and piano	1. & 2. words by André Delacour; 3. words by Leconte de Lisle; Published Paris: Max Eschig & Cie., plate no. M.E. 1631. Dedication: "à Mademoiselle Marthe Saisset".
Piano	67	(1924)	Rapsodie irlandaise	piano	Published Paris: Max Eschig & Cie., plate no. M.E. 2264 (as part of the Album celtique, 1929). Dedication: "à mon fils Patrice".
Chamber	68	1926	Deux Morceaux: 1. Pièce celtique 2. Jazz	alto saxophone and piano	Published Paris: Max Eschig & Cie., plate no. M.E. 1637. Dedication: "à M. René Laurent".
Piano	69	1926–1929	Clamart | Aubervilliers | Meudon | Robinson | Verrières | Bourg-la-Reine	piano	Initially self-published as 3 pieces (1926); extended edition published Paris: Éditons Max Eschig (1929), plate no. M.E. 2410. Dedication: "à Maurice Servais".
Chamber	70	1927	Trio	violin, flute and bassoon	Published Paris: Max Eschig & Cie., plate no. M.E. 1985 (wrongly dated to 1926). Dedication: "A mes amis Emile Loiseau, Gaston Blanquart et Gustave Dhérin".
Chamber	71	1929	Quatre Morceaux: 1. Fox Trot; 2. Tango; 3. Chanson de l'émigrant 4. Lever du soleil dans les Hébrides	alto saxophone or viola and piano	Published Paris: Éditions Max Eschig, plate no. M.E. 1941. Dedications: 1. "à Paul-Louis Neuberth"; 2. "à Carol-Berard"; 3. "à Madame Neuberth"; 4. "à Paul-Louis Neuberth".
Vocal	72	1927	Trois Chansons celtiques: 1. La Chanson du rouet; 2. Berceuse d'Armorique; 3. Le Départ des pêcheurs	medium voice and piano	1. Words by Leconte de Lisle; 2. words by Anatole Le Braz; words by Pierre Scize; Published Paris: Éditions Max Eschig, plate no. M.E. 2115. Dedications: 1. "à Henri Collet"; 2. "à Eugène Cools"; 3. "à Pierre Scize".
Piano		1927–1928	À la manière de ..., 30 Pastiches Book I: 1. Johannes Brahms; 2. César Franck; 3. Edvard Grieg; 4. Robert Schumann; 5. Gabriel Fauré; 6. Antonín Dvořák Book II; 7. Richard Strauss; 8. Stephen Heller; 9. Claude Debussy; 10. Benjamin Godard; 11. Max Reger et Paul Delmet; 12. Alexandre Borodine Book III; 13. Felix Mendelssohn-Bartholdy; 14. Vincent d'Indy; 15. Muzio Clementi; 16. "Jeune génie de l'avant-garde" 17. Joaquín Turina; 18. Gioacchino Rossini Book IV; 19. Carl Maria von Weber; 20. Domenico Scarlatti; 21. Giuseppe Verdi; 22. Frédéric Chopin; 23. Emmanuel Chabrier; 24. Franz Liszt Book V 25. Franz Schubert; 26. Georg Friedrich Haendel; 27. Jules Massenet; 28. Johann Strauss II; 29. Maurice Ravel; 30. Hugo Wolf	piano	Books 1–4 (1927); Book 5 (1928); Published Paris: Éditions Max Eschig, plate no. M.E. 1781, M.E. 1782; M.E. 1783, M.E. 1986, M.E. 2251. Dedications: Books I–III "à Marthe Le Breton", Books IV–V "à Richard Byk".
Vocal	73	1928	Deux Mélodies: 1. Le Chasseur noir 2. La Chanson du vent de mer	medium voice and piano	1. Words by Paul Gérardy; 2. words by Anatole Le Braz; Published Paris: Éditions Max Eschig, plate no. M.E. 2249 & M.E. 2250.
Chamber	74	1928	Pièce celtique	cello (or bassoon) and piano	Published Paris: Éditions Max Eschig, plate no. M.E. 2252. Dedication: "à Madame Fernande Kufferath".
Chamber	75	1930	Quatrième quatuor [String Quartet No. 4]	2 violins, viola and cello	Published Paris: Éditions Max Eschig, plate no. M.E. 2463 (score) & M.E. 2464 (parts).
Vocal	76	1928	Trois Petits trios pour voix de femmes: 1. Il était une fois 2. Panis angelicus 3. Vers traduits de Goethe	soprano, mezzo-soprano and alto (solos)	1. Words by Jean Ajalbert; 2. words by St Thomas Aquinas; 3. words by Johann Wolfgang von Goethe, translated by Louis de Ronchaud; Unpublished.
Chamber	77	1928	Deux Pièces celtiques: 1. Danse écossaise 2. Pièce celtique	viola and piano	Unpublished.
Chamber	78	1929	Sonatine	two violins (or two groups of violins)	Unpublished.
Vocal	79	1932	Deux Mélodies: 1. La lune 2. À Deux	soprano and piano	1. Words by Paul Verlaine; 2. words by Prosper Blanchemain; Published Paris: Éditions Max Eschig, plate no. M.E. 3694. Dedication: "A Mlle. Marguerite Breitner".
Chamber	80	1929	Deuxième sonatine	violin or viola and piano	Published Paris: Proprieté de l'auteur. Dedication: "A Suzanne Chevaillier".
Chamber	81	1929	Sonatine: 1. Moderato assai 2. Allegretto à la manière de Johannes Brahms; 3. Allegro à la manière de Félix Mendelssohn Bartholdy	cello and piano	Published Paris: Proprieté de l'auteur. Dedication: "À Madeleine Monnier".

== List of compositions by genre ==
=== Piano music ===
- Ländliche Skizzen [op. 1?]. Contains: 1. Am Bache; 2. Waldvöglein; 3. Ländler; 4. Ringellied; 5. Legende; 6. Die Sägemühle (1885)
- Ein Spinnerliedchen op. 2 (1886)
- Two Studies: Staccato and Legato op. 4 (c.1886–7)
- Carneval-Studien op. 6 (1887)
- Im Gebirg (In the Mountains) op. 7. 4 Klavierstücke (1887)
- Album-Blätter op. 8 (1887)
- Étude-Fantaisie op. 9 (1888)
- Miniatures. Cinq petites pièces op. 11 (1889)
- Study (1890)
- Variations sur un thème original dans le style irlandais op. 12 (1902)
- Deux Études pour la main gauche seule (1906)
- Mazurka et Polonaise op. 17 (1906)
- Petit album op. 18 (1907). Contains: 1. En route (On the Road); 2. L'Auberge (The Inn); 3. Enfants qui passent (Passing Children); 4. Aux temps passés (From Old Times); 5. Danseuse sur la scène (Ballet Girl on the Stage); 6. Sonatine; 7. Scherzette.
- Aus dem Kinderleben. 6 Tonbilder op. 19 (c.1907–8). Contains: 1. Puppenwiegenlied; 2. Puppentanz; 3. Im Wald; 4. Erster Walzer; 5. Schläfriges Kind; 6. Auf Wiedersehen.
- Au village. Petite suite caractéristique (1907). Contains: 1. Noce campagnarde; 2. Fillettes; 3. Basse-Cour; 4. Sur l'herbe; 5. Au bord du ruisseau.
- Au bord de la forêt op. 21 (c.1907–8)
- Eaux fortes op. 24 (1908). Contains: 1. Sérénade espagnole; 2. Bergérie; 3. Petite mazurka.
- Étude op. 25 (1907)
- Nouvelles feuilles d'album op. 27 (1908). Contains: 1. Madrigal; 2. Canon; 3. Style irlandais; 4. Petites scènes parisiennes.
- Variations sur un air irlandais ancien op. 28 (1908)
- Valses op. 32 (1903)
- Petite suite irlandaise, d'après les airs anciens de la collection Petrie (1909), for piano 4-hands
- Croquis de femmes op. 33 (1911). Contains: 1. Au couvent: 2. Bavardes; 3. La Vieille tante; 4. Mondaine; 5. Jeunes anglaises; 6. Dans les jardins du sérail; 7. Charmeuse de serpents.
- Petite suite op. 34 (1911)
- Kinder-Album. 24 kleine Präludien in verschiedenen Ton- und Taktarten op. 35 (1910)
- Fêtes. Deux Morceaux descriptifs op. 36 (1911). Contains: 1. Fête de village au XVIIIme siècle; 2. Fête populaire dans la banlieue de Paris au XXme siècle.
- Incunabula op. 39 (1912). Contains: 1. Berceuse; 2. Bébé dort; 3. Croquemitaine.
- En passant ... (études d'après nature) op. 40 (1912). Contains: 1. Petit pâtre sur les hauts pâturages; 2. Champ de blé au clair de lune; 3. Dans une petite ville flamande le dimanche; 4. Cimes neigeuses; 5. Sieste en chemin de fer.
- Valses caprices op. 41 (1912). Contains: 1. Valse rustique; 2. Valse canaille; 3. Valse distraite; 4. Valse boiteuse; 5. Valse érotique; 6. À la Reger; 7. Encore une valse.
- Gitaneries op. 42 (1912)
- Sonatine op. 43 (1912)
- Sentes et chemins (Nouvelles études d'après nature) op. 44 (1912). Contains: 1. Ouvriers allants à l'usine; 2. Promenades du philosophie; 3. A travers bois; 4. Cornemuse en têt; 5. Sur la route d'Amalfi; 6. Sentier de Meudon au printemps; 6. Par la pluie.
- Pièces celtiques op. 45 (1912)
- Croquis parisiens op. 47 (1913). Contains: 1. Promenade matinale au Jardin du Luxembourg; 2. L'Américain qui a bien diné; 3. Dans un atelier de couturières.
- Impressions humoristiques op. 48 (1913). Contains: 1. Tupae. Polka; 2. Das Fräulein stand am Meere und seufzte lang und bang; 3. Napolitains; 4. En regardant une ronde de jeunes filles; 5. Chanteuse de beuglant; 6. Bébé prend sa médecine.
- Huit Pièces celtiques op. 51 (date uncertain)
- Sonatine celtique op. 53 (date uncertain)
- Epigrammes d'un solitaire op. 55 (1924). Contains: 1. La Forêt de Clamart à l'aube; 2. Un Jardin arabe; 3. Une Pagode indochinoise; 4. Un Berceau; 5. Un vieux cimetière; 6. Un Souvenir lointain.
- Trois Pièces exotiques op. 57 (1924). Contains: 1. Fillettes brunes; 2. Le Goût de la cannelle; 3. Nègre endimanché.
- Étude de concert op. 60 (1924)
- Douze Canons à deux voix à tous les intervalles op. 64 (1926)
- Rapsodie irlandaise op. 67 (c.1926)
- Banlieues. Six Petites pièces op. 69 (1926)
- À la manière de ... 18 Pastiches, 3 volumes (1927)
- À la manière de ... Six Nouveaux pastiches, 4th volume to above (1927)

=== Vocal music ===
- Vier Lieder op. 3 (1886). Contains: 1. Leise zieht durch mein Gemüth; 2. Die blauen Frühlingsaugen; 3. Mädchen mit dem rothen Mündchen; 4. Zum Schluß: "Sag, wo ist dein schönes Liebchen".
- [songs] op. 5 (1887), title unknown. The only published movement is no. 1: The Blackbird has a Golden Bill.
- Annie. Chanson écossaise (1907)
- Quatre Mélodies op. 23 (1908). Contains: 1. Lydia; 2. Epiphanie; 3. Là-bas!; 4. Le Revenant.
- La Fille aux cheveux de lin. Chanson écossaise (1913)
- Trois Chansons espagnoles op. 42bis (1923). Contains: 1. [unknown]; 2. Auf den Wällen Salamankas; 3. Neben mir wohnt Don Henriquez.
- Le Mort joyeux op. 56a (1924)
- Trois Mélodies op. 66 (1925). Contains: 1. Si la distance qui nous séparé; 2. Paysage; 3. Chanson écossaise.
- Trois Chansons celtiques op. 72 (1927). Contains: 1. [unknown]; 2. Le Chanson du rouet; 3. [unknown].
- Deux Mélodies (published 1934). Contains: 1. La Lune; 2. À deux.

=== Chamber music ===
==== Duos ====
- Berceuse (1901) for violin and piano
- Sonate en style irlandais op. 14 (1904) for violin and piano
- Rapsodie celtique op. 50 (1915) for violin and piano
- Sonate celtique op. 62 (1924) for viola and piano; as Sonatine celtique op. 62 arrangement by the composer for violin and piano
- Rapsodie gaélique op. 63 (1925) for cello and piano
- Deux Morceaux op. 68 (1926) for saxophone and piano
- Quatre Morceaux op. 71 (1929) for alto-saxophone or viola and piano
- Pièce celtique op. 74 (1928) for cello or bassoon and piano
- Deuxième Sonatine op. 80 (1929) for violin and piano
- Sonatine op. 81 (1929) for cello and piano

==== Trios ====
- Lieder an den Mond op. 10 (1888) for violin, cello, piano
- Petit trio celtique op. 52 (1921) for violin, viola, cello
- Trio op. 54 (1921) for 2 clarinets and bassoon
- Trio op. 70 (1926) for flute, violin, bassoon

==== Quartets ====
- Prémier Quatuor (Suite) op. 46 (1912) for string quartet
- Deuxième Quatuor op. 49 (1920) for string quartet
- Variations sur un thème de six notes op. 58 (1924) for flute, violin, viola, cello
- Quatre Pièces celtiques op. 59 (1925) for cor anglais, violin, viola, cello
- Troisième Quatuor op. 61 (1927) for string quartet
- Sérénade op. 65 (1925) for string quartet
- Quatrième Quatuor op. 75 (1930) for string quartet
