= Max Eschig =

Czech-born French music publisher

Max Eschig (27 May 1872 – 3 September 1927) was a Czech-born French music publisher who published many of the leading French composers of the twentieth century, later also including many East European and Latin American composers.

== Life ==
Eschig was born in Troppau (now Opava, Czech Republic). He worked for a while for the Mainz, Germany, based music publisher B. Schotts Söhne before he went to Paris in 1907 to establish his own music publishing company. Initially, he also acted as the French representative of publishers like Breitkopf & Härtel, Ricordi, Schott, Simrock, Universal Edition, and others. He grew considerably in importance in France when he took over a number of established publishers in the course of the 1920s.

Eschig died in Paris in 1927 at the age of 55.

== Company history ==
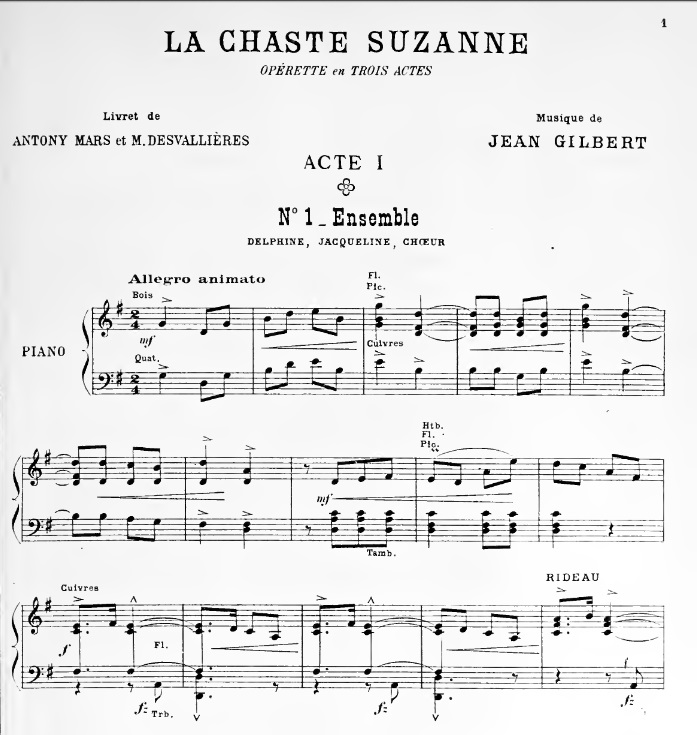
Die keusche Susanne (La Chaste Susanne de Jean Gilbert, Published in 1912 by Max Eschig.

Eschig began by publishing light music and French-language versions of Viennese operettas such as Franz Lehár's Die lustige Witwe. With his own catalogue, he entirely devoted himself to twentieth century music, initially by acquiring other publishers such as E. Demets (in 1923). By partnering with Emilio Pujol in his "Bibliothèque de musique ancienne et moderne pour guitare" (from 1927), he became a leading publisher of music for the classical guitar. Since 1924, he was already the publisher of the works of Heitor Villa-Lobos, which also contained many works for the guitar.

After Eschig's death, his company which traded as "Max Eschig & Cie.", was transformed into a publicly listed company and rebranded "Éditions Max Eschig" (from late 1927). His successors at the head of the company were Eugène Cools (until 1936) and Jean Marietti (until 1977), during whose time the company took over "La Sirène musicale" (1940) and other publishing houses such as Brousson & Cie., J. Vieu, G. Spork, and P. Dupont. Marietti's widow Simone managed the company until 1987 when it was taken over by Durand and Amphion. They fused with Salabert to form Durand-Salabert-Eschig. Since 2007, Durand-Salabert-Eschig is part of Universal Music Publishing Group, a market-leading company in European music publishing. International distribution is managed by MGB Hal Leonard.

The first composer to join Max Eschig & Cie. was Manuel de Falla with works like La vida breve and Noches en los Jardines de España. Previously, by taking over Demets, he became the publisher of some early works by Maurice Ravel (Pavane pour une infante défunte, Jeux d'eau, Miroirs). Of early 20th-century composers, Eschig published many works by Arthur Honegger, Charles Koechlin, Darius Milhaud, Francis Poulenc, Erik Satie, Charles Tournemire, Henri Sauguet, as well as Spanish and Latin American composers such as Isaac Albéniz, Leo Brouwer, Ernesto Halffter, Federico Mompou, Joaquín Nin, Joaquín Turina, and Heitor Villa-Lobos. Of Central and East European composers, Eschig published works by Bohuslav Martinů, Alexandre Tansman, and Karol Szymanowski. As part of the Universal group, Éditions Eschig continues to publish many contemporary French and international composers.
