= Paul Sordes =

French painter (1877–1937)

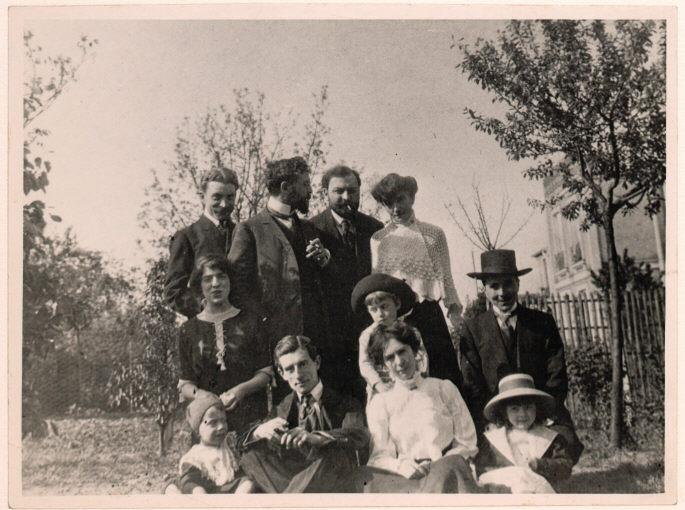
Meeting of artists at the Schmitts' residence in Saint-Cloud, circa 1910. Paul Sordes is in the back row, far left. From left to right, front row: Roger Haour, Maurice Ravel, Jeanne and Christiane Pivet. Second row: Jane Haour, "Raton" Schmitt, Léon Pivet; Back row: Sordes, Florent Schmitt, Léon-Paul Fargue, Jeanne Schmitt.

Paul Sordes (9 February 1877 – 20 May 1937) was a French painter from Paris and set designer who was an original member of Les Apaches, a group of artists in early 20th-century Paris whose most famous member was Maurice Ravel. It was at Sordes' studio home at 39 rue Dulong above Montmartre that the group regularly met on Saturdays. In fact, the first meeting of the group occurred at his studio in either June 1902 or May 1903.

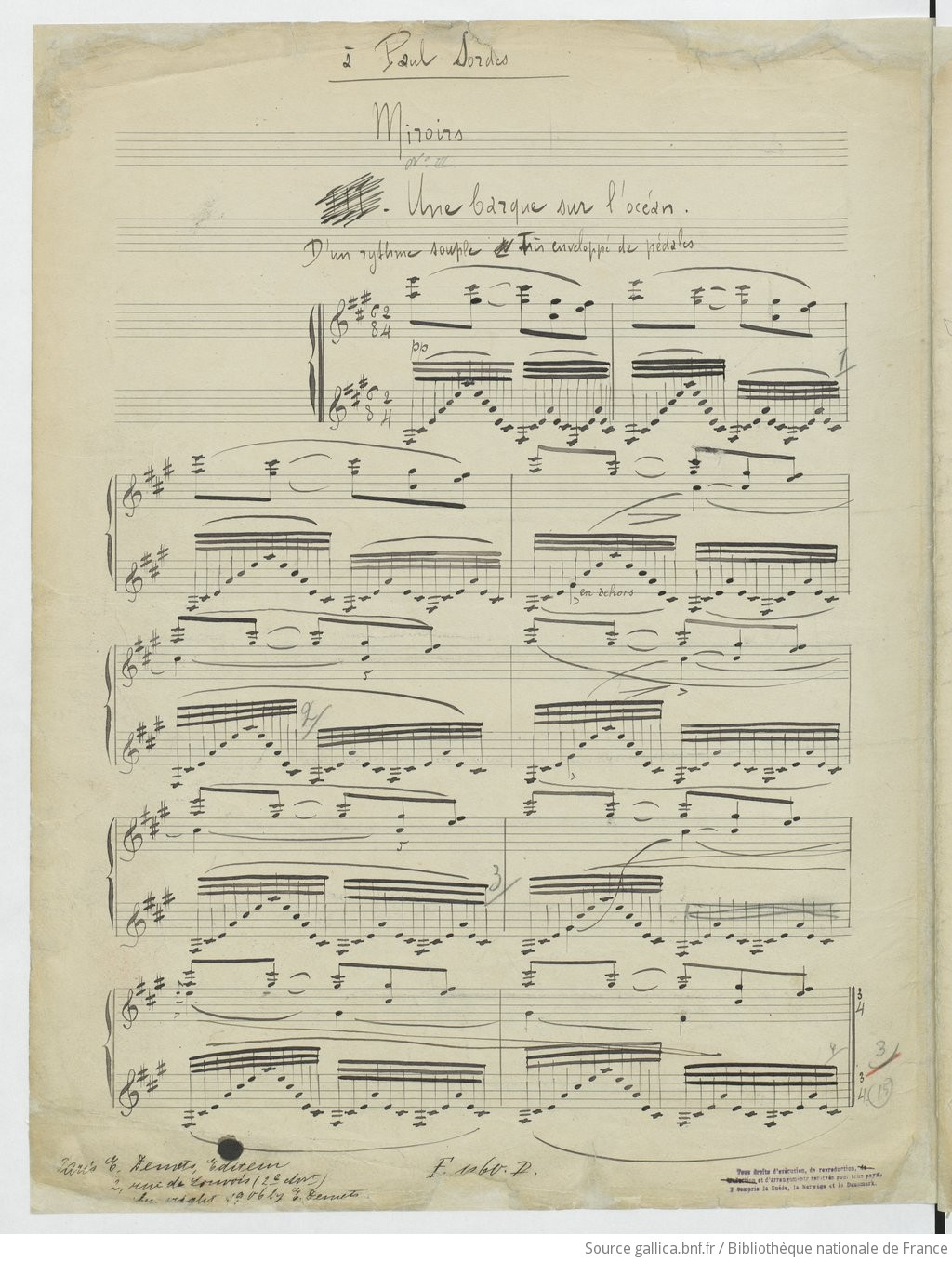
First page of Miroirs III, Une barque sur l'océan with a dedication to Paul Sordes at the top.

Around 1900, Tristan Klingsor first met Sordes at the Salon des Indépendants in Paris, where he was impressed by Sordes' drawings and watercolors.

Klingsor called him une sorte de Ravel de la palette in an obituary, and Ravel dedicated Une barque sur l'océan from the piano suite Miroirs to him.

His brother Charles Sordes was also a member of Les Apaches.

== See also ==
- Ricardo Viñes
- Michel-Dimitri Calvocoressi
