= Alborada del gracioso =

Orchestral composition by Maurice Ravel

Ravel in 1914

Alborada del gracioso (The Jester's Aubade) is the fourth of the five movements of Maurice Ravel's piano suite Miroirs, written in 1905. Dedicated to fellow Les Apaches member Michel-Dimitri Calvocoressi, it is about seven minutes long and, as part of the suite, has always been regularly played and recorded by pianists. Alborada was orchestrated by Ravel fourteen years later for use as a ballet. In this form, as a standalone orchestral piece, it is often played in concert.

== Title ==
The Spanish title has no exact translation. Alborada, or dawn in English, has various musical meanings: a song for a wedding day; a folk dance; a Galician folk tune; and a type of rhythmically free music played on bagpipes and drum. But as usually construed for Ravel's piece it is an announcement of dawn, a sunrise song, an aubade. Gracioso has roots in the troubadour and trouvère traditions: he was a figure of Spanish comedy, the genial buffoon, the grotesque lover, an amusingly entertaining person, a servant who comments on the actions of his superiors. Accordingly the whole title is rendered variously as Morning Song of the Clown, Morning Song of the Buffoon or The Jester's Aubade.

== Background ==
In the years 1904–05, as he was finishing his String Quartet, Ravel composed Miroirs (Mirrors), a suite of five short piano pieces. He later orchestrated two of them: the orchestral version of "Une Barque sur l'océan" (A Barque on the Ocean) came out in 1906; more than a decade elapsed before Ravel orchestrated the other, the "Alborada del gracioso".

The orchestration came about at the invitation of Sergei Diaghilev, the impresario of the Ballets Russes. He was well acquainted with Ravel, having commissioned from him the music for Daphnis et Chloé in 1909. Diaghilev visited Spain for the first time in 1916 and was so taken with the country that he commissioned several ballets on Spanish themes. The first appeared in the same year: Leonid Massine's Las meninas, inspired by Velázquez's painting of the same name. It was danced to a composite score that included "Alborada del gracioso" (in its piano version) along with Gabriel Fauré's Pavane and pieces by Louis Aubert and Emmanuel Chabrier. Diaghilev commissioned Ravel to orchestrate the Alborada (and the Chabrier piece, the Menuet pompeux) for a production of the ballet, retitled Les jardins d'Aranjuez, at the Alhambra Theatre, London in 1919. Before the ballet opened in London the orchestral Alborada was premiered in Paris on 17 May 1919 by the Pasdeloup Orchestra conducted by Rhené-Baton.

== Music ==
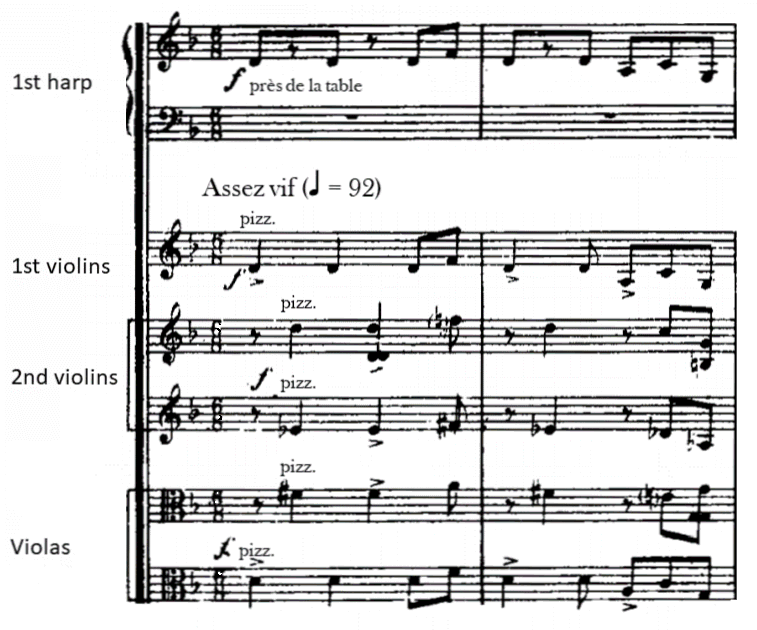
Opening bars

The music consists of two sections of lively dance music, separated by a rhapsodic, extended song. The opening is marked assez vif (fairly quick), ♩ = 92. Like the piano original, the piece begins with imitations of guitar music. In the orchestral version they are produced by the first harp, played close to the sound board, along with precisely arranged pizzicato violins and violas. The basic metre of the opening section is 6/8 but Ravel varies it with occasional bars of 3/8 and 9/8.

The music is mainly quiet for the first 28 bars as the themes are established. They are then brought together in what the commentator Eric Bromberger describes as "a great explosion of sound, subtly tinted by Ravel's use of castanets, tambourine, cymbals and harp". and then a fortissimo chord introduces the central episode, a plaintive 3/4 melody for solo bassoon – the clown's song – alternating with shimmering string sonorities. To represent the sounds of the extreme treble of the piano original, the accompaniment to the bassoon melody is scored for 24-part strings, some instruments bowed, others plucked, and deploying a range of harmonics, multiple stops and sul tasto effects.

The music makes a gradual return to the original tempo; Ravel added four bars to the original score here, making use of woodwind tremolos. The piece builds to a conclusion and ends in what critics have variously described as "a blaze of orchestral color", "an exhilarating climax", and "a grand and glorious racket".

== Instrumentation ==
The piece is scored for piccolo, two flutes, two oboes, cor anglais, two clarinets, two bassoons, contrabassoon, four horns, two trumpets, three trombones, tuba, timpani, crotales, triangle, Basque drum, castanets, snare drum, cymbals, bass drum, xylophone, two harps, and strings.

== Recordings ==
The first recording of the orchestral Alborada del gracioso was made by the Berlin State Opera Orchestra, conducted by Otto Klemperer in 1926. Since then there have been numerous versions on record. In a comparative survey of recordings for BBC Radio 3, Rob Cowan short-listed the following:

Orchestra	Conductor	Year
Suisse Romande	Ernest Ansermet	1951
Orchestre national de la Radiodiffusion Française	André Cluytens	1953
Paris Conservatoire	Albert Wolff	1959
Suisse Romande	Ansermet	1960
Philharmonia	Carlo Maria Giulini	1960
Paris Conservatoire	Cluytens	1962
Detroit Symphony	Paul Paray	1963
Orchestre de Paris	Herbert von Karajan	1971
Boston Symphony	Seiji Ozawa	1974
Orchestre de Paris	Jean Martinon	1975
Montreal Symphony	Charles Dutoit	1983
Orchestre national de France	Eliahu Inbal	1987
London Symphony	Claudio Abbado	1989
Berlin Philharmonic	Pierre Boulez	1994
Orchestre de Paris	Christoph Eschenbach	2004

Recordings recommended by other critics include:

Orchestra	Conductor	Year	Ref
Chicago Symphony	Fritz Reiner	1958	
Philadelphia Orchestra	Eugene Ormandy	1960	
Royal Philharmonic	André Previn	1986	
Dallas Symphony	Eduardo Mata	1988	
Ulster Orchestra	Yan Pascal Tortelier	1993	

In 2015 the conductor François-Xavier Roth and the orchestra Les Siècles, which specialises in historically informed performance, released a recording of the Alborada using original or reproduction instruments of the period.

== References and sources ==
=== Sources ===
- Baker, Richard (1979). Richard Baker's Music Guide. Newton Abbot: David and Charles. ISBN 978-0-71-537782-6.
- Chase, Gilbert (1942). The Music of Spain. London: Dent. OCLC 12178522.
- Lee, Douglas (2002). The Modern Repertory of the Symphony Orchestra. New York: Routledge. ISBN 978-0-41-593846-4.
- March, Ivan; Edward Greenfield; Robert Layton; Paul Czajkowski (2008). The Penguin Guide to Recorded Classical Music. London: Penguin. ISBN 978-0-141-03336-5.
- Nichols, Roger (2011). Ravel. New Haven: Yale University Press. ISBN 978-0-30-010882-8.
- Orenstein, Arbie (1991) [1975]. Ravel: Man and Musician. Mineola, US: Dover. ISBN 978-0-486-26633-6.
- Ravel, Maurice (1920). Alborada del gracioso: orchestral score (PDF). Paris: E. Demets. OCLC 993665100.
- Russ, Michael (2000). "Ravel and the orchestra". In Deborah Mawer (ed.). Cambridge Companion to Ravel. Cambridge: Cambridge University Press. ISBN 978-0-521-64026-8.
- Svejda, Jim (1995). The Record Shelf Guide to Classical CDs. Rocklin: Prima. OCLC 103681656.
