= Descriptions automatiques =

1913 piano composition by Erik Satie

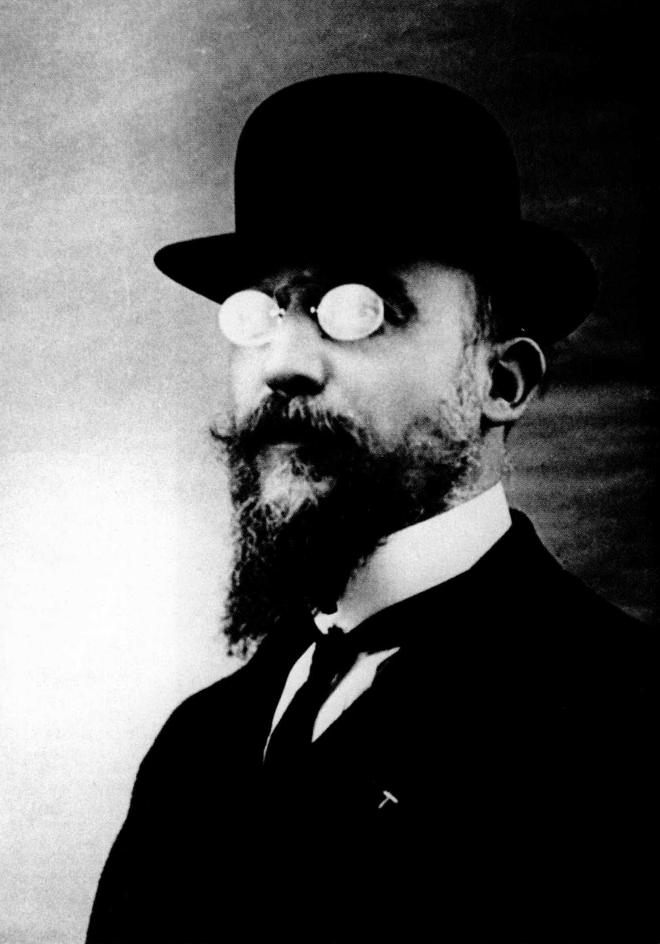
Erik Satie

The Descriptions automatiques (Automatic Descriptions) is a 1913 piano composition by Erik Satie. The second of his humoristic keyboard suites (1912–15), it set the tone for the rest of the series by introducing elements of musical parody, and in the increasingly important role played by the verbal commentary. In performance it lasts about 4 minutes.

== Background ==
On April 5, 1913, pianist Ricardo Viñes successfully premiered Satie's first humoristic suite, the Veritables Preludes flasques (pour un chien), at the Salle Pleyel in Paris. The composer used the occasion to publish an advertisement announcing his future creative plans in that day's issue of the periodical Le Guide du concert. Anticipating attacks from his critics, he adopted a high-handed tone:

The Véritables préludes flasques...opens a series of pianistic works: Descriptions automatiques, Embryons desséchés, Chapitres tournés en tous sens and Vieux sequins et vieilles cuirasses. In them I devote myself to the sweet joys of fantasy. Those who will not understand are requested by me to observe the most respectful silence and to show an attitude of complete submission and inferiority. That is their true role.

This sardonic blurb shows how Satie often invented the curious titles and texts of his compositions before the music was written, though these were subject to change depending on where his inspiration took him. The Descriptions automatiques had already gone through two working titles (Descriptions hypocrites and Vocations électriques) before the April 5 announcement, while the music would not be composed until April 21–26, 1913. Satie's sketches also show how the first piece (Sur un vaisseau) initially described a wolf and a tuna fish before evolving into a description of a ship.

Ricardo Viñes gave the first performance of the Descriptions automatiques at the Salle Érard in Paris on June 5, 1913. It was published by the firm E. Demets that same year. Satie enthused that Viñes played the suite "with an irresistibly droll air of secrecy", a comment that may hold a key to the interpretation of his humoristic keyboard works. Satie disciple (and Viñes' most famous student) Francis Poulenc believed as much, bluntly stating that to perform this music authentically "it is forbidden...to wink at the audience."

== Satie and musical parody ==
The Descriptions automatiques inaugurated Satie's use of evocative fragments of popular music as an important element of his mature compositional style. A possible trigger for this development was the 1912 publication of his Pièces froides, composed 15 years earlier, which would have reacquainted him with his first, isolated attempt at purely musical parody. In the intervening years he had eked out a living in part as an arranger and accompanist for cabaret star Vincent Hyspa (1865–1938), a sort of Parisian "Weird Al" Yankovic of his time who wrote and sang satirical lyrics to well-known tunes. Biographer Steven Moore Whiting maintains that Hyspa had a decisive influence on Satie as a musical humorist. Satie professed to hate his cabaret work, claiming "it is more stupid and dirty than anything", but beginning with the Descriptions automatiques he apparently found in it a means to move beyond the academic influences of his studies at the Schola Cantorum (1905–12), which were still evident in the Véritables préludes flasques. The old Pièces froides parody, a clever reworking of the 18th century Northumbrian folk tune The Keel Row, could have provided Satie with a template on how to achieve this in a concert hall setting, enabling him to indulge his eccentric wit while chuckling over the serious pretensions of classical music - "music to be listened to with one's head in one's hands," as Satie's future propagandist Jean Cocteau would characterize it.

Satie would borrow from popular sources for comic effect in a number of his compositions, though never more extensively than in the years 1913–14, the most prolific of his career. Robert Orledge listed the practical reasons for this: "First, they helped him to sustain the unaccustomed bout of creativity that followed the sudden demand for novel groups of piano pieces from his publisher Demets. Second, they gave these humorous piano pieces greater popular appeal. Third, guessing their sources provided a sort of musical quiz that helped sustain public interest after their initial vogue had faded: the way Satie succeeded in this respect can be seen from the number of editions these pieces enjoyed in subsequent years. Lastly, popular sources helped Satie rediscover his path forward by taking some of the responsibility for inventing original material from his shoulders."

A hindrance to the full appreciation of Satie's parodistic music lies in its ephemerality. In his Allmusic review of the Descriptions automatiques Alexander Carpenter noted that "although these little pieces stand on their own as charming examples of Satie the humorist, musicologists have rightly pointed out that Satie's works in this vein, like those of Ives, are self-limiting in terms of accessibility by the fact of their use of borrowed material. Street songs and children's rhymes that would have struck a chord and conveyed a multiplicity of meanings to a Parisian audience in 1913 say little to twenty-first century ears."

== Music and texts ==
The Descriptions automatiques consists of three pieces marked Assez lent (Rather Slow), Lent (Slow), and Pas accéléré (Do Not Accelerate).

1. Sur un vaisseau (On a Ship)

Dedicated to Madame Fernand Dreyfus

The first Description opens with a gentle tango-like ostinato that flows throughout the piece, above which float a succession of short motifs. It does not sound particularly "nautical", although Satie's playful directions to the pianist advise otherwise ("On the Seven Seas", "A little spray", "The Captain says have a very nice trip"). Thus it comes as a surprise to the knowledgeable listener when at the midpoint – where the annotation reads "The ship chuckles" – Satie quotes the music of a French children's song that begins with the lyric, "Maman, les p' tits bateaux qui vont sur l'eau ont-ils des jambes?" ("Mama, do the little boats on the water have legs?"). The joke seems to arise naturally from the preceding material, and just as discreetly slips away.

2. Sur une lanterne (On a Street Lamp)

For Madame Joseph Ravel

A nocturne in all but designation, this little night piece is built on the refrain of the French revolutionary song La Carmagnole ("Let's dance the Carmagnole"), which is transposed and fragmented over a tiptoeing pianissimo two-chord rhythm. Satie actually derived his title from another revolutionary tune, Ça Ira, with its call to hang the ruling classes from the street lamps ("Les aristocrats à la lanterne!"); it was frequently sung in conjunction with La Carmagnole during the Reign of Terror. The violence implied by these sources is barely hinted at in the music (to be played nocturnement), or in the extramusical texts for the pianist which suggest a child speaking to a lamplighter going about his duties. Biographer Pierre-Daniel Templier found in Sur une lanterne "a new form of mysticism in Satie – a kind of elusive mystery, subtly evoked in a musical atmosphere which is partly poetic, partly amused, but very moving."

3. Sur un casque (On a Helmet)

For Madame Paulette Darty

The third Description is a straightforward spoof of martial music, imitating bugle calls and drum rolls in the deepest registers of the piano. Satie's annotations are excited observations of a military parade: "Here they come...How many people are there...Look, the drummers!...And here comes the handsome colonel, all alone." He wraps up by commanding the pianist to play "As light as an egg", clearly a private joke for the performer, as the section it connotes is to be rendered fortissimo with a crescendo. Given the piece's dedication to Paulette Darty, a former cabaret star and Satie's longtime friend, he probably had a music hall-style parody march in mind.

== Satie and Schoenberg ==
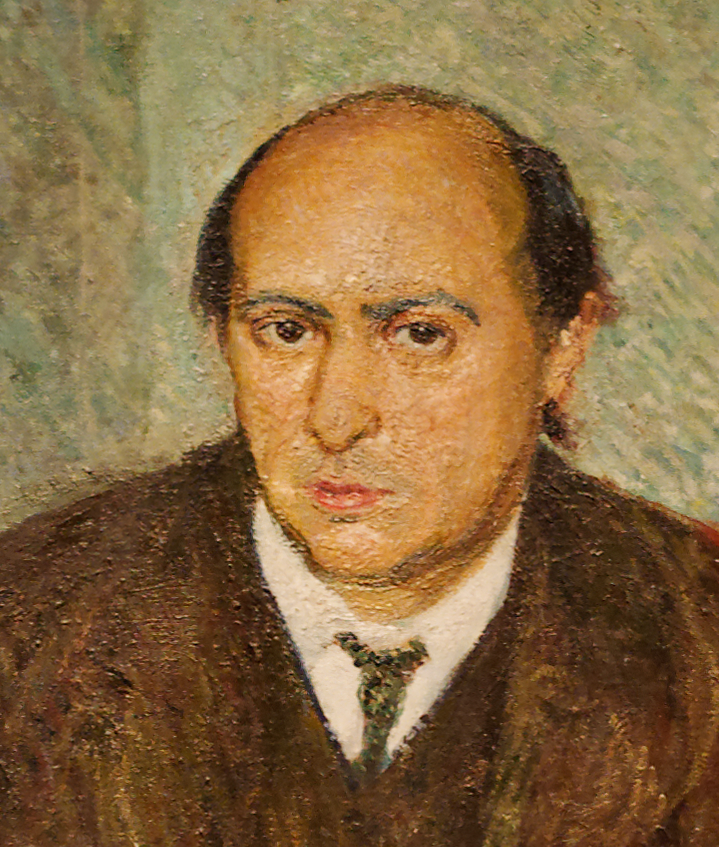
Arnold Schoenberg helped introduce Satie's music to Vienna and Prague, including the Descriptions automatiques

After World War I, some of the earliest performances of Satie's music in Central Europe were promoted by Arnold Schoenberg. On January 30, 1920, three Satie piano suites from 1913 – the Descriptions automatiques, Chapitres tournés en tous sens and Vieux sequins et vieilles cuirasses – were programmed at an event sponsored by Schoenberg's Society for Private Musical Performances in Vienna. The pianist was Eduard Steuermann. They stirred enough interest to be repeated at four additional Society concerts through 1921, including one at the Mozarteum in Prague on March 8, 1920. Steuermann performed on all but one of these occasions (June 17, 1920), when the pianist was Ernst Bachrich. Schoenberg's advocacy reflected the altruistic aims he had for his short-lived Society, which folded in 1922. Most of his followers in the Second Viennese School regarded Satie as a trivial farceur.

For his part Satie ventured no public opinion about Schoenberg as a composer, but in 1921 – when anti-Germanic sentiment was still a factor in France's postwar music scene - he defended his Austrian colleague as a matter of principle: "We know that Art has no homeland...poor thing...its lack of fortune prevents it...So why not play Richard Strauss and Schoenberg?"

== Recordings ==
Francis Poulenc first recorded the Descriptions automatiques for the Columbia label in 1950. Other notable recordings are by Frank Glazer (Vox, 1968), Aldo Ciccolini (EMI, 1971, 1988), Jean-Joël Barbier (Universal Classics France, 1971), Jean-Joël Barbier (Universal Classics France, 1971, reissued 2002), Jacques Février (excerpts, Everest, 1975, reissued by Essential Media in 2011), Yūji Takahashi (Denon, 1976), Philippe Entremont (CBS Masterworks, 1982), France Clidat (Forlane, 1984), Jean-Pierre Armengaud (Le Chant Du Monde, 1986), Anne Queffélec (Virgin Classics, 1988), Pascal Rogé (Decca, 1989), Klára Koermendi (Naxos, 1993), Bojan Gorišek (Audiophile Classics, 1994), Olof Höjer (Swedish Society Discofil, 1996), Jean-Yves Thibaudet (Decca, 2002), and Alexandre Tharaud (Harmonia Mundi, 2009).
