= Michel-Dimitri Calvocoressi =

Music critic and musicologist (1877–1944)

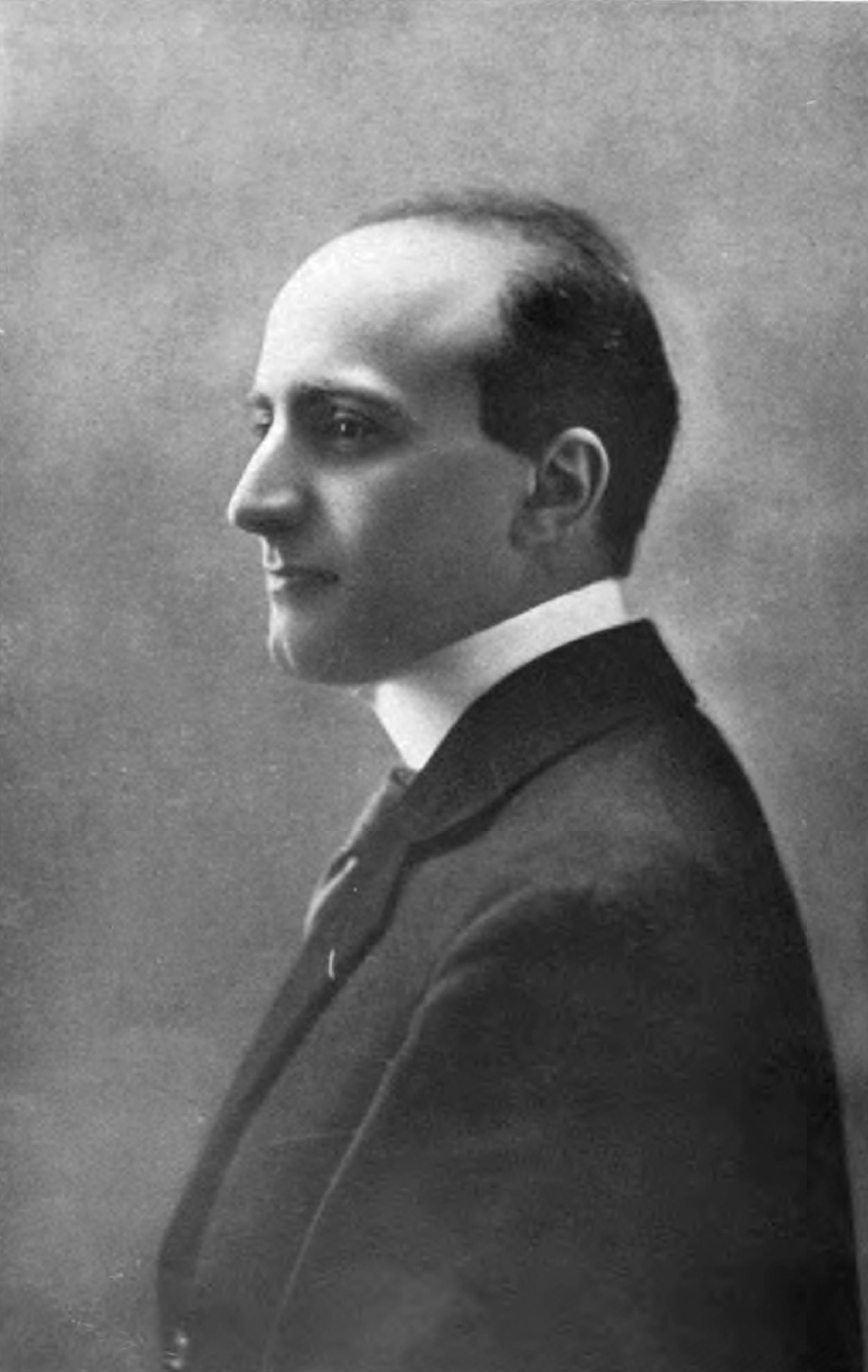
Calvocoressi, c. 1913

Michel-Dimitri Calvocoressi (2 October 1877 – 1 February 1944) was a French-British music critic and musicologist of Greek descent. He is especially noted for his writings on Russian classical music, particularly on the life and works of Modest Mussorgsky, and his close association with the French musical establishment.

Born in Marseille, Calvocoressi learned numerous languages in his youth and attempted various careers before settling on music criticism. His early career was spent as an influential music critic in Paris, where he contributed to English and French newspapers: Gil Blas, the Comoedia Illustré, The Morning Post and The Musical Times, among others. He was well acquainted with the city's musical figures, particularly Maurice Ravel. Alongside Ravel and the pianist Ricardo Viñes, Calvocoressi founded the Apaches musical society.

After serving as a cryptographer in England for World War I, he remained in London to continue criticism and musicological writing for the rest of his life. Although he wrote his later books in English and came to know English cultural figures such as Arnold Bennett and Ralph Vaughan Williams, his colleague Gerald Abraham remarked that "he never enjoyed the influence and authority in London that he had exercised in Paris". In addition to his writings on Russian music and Mussorgsky, he wrote on the music of Liszt, Glinka, Schumann, Koechlin and Debussy.

== Early life and education ==
Michel-Dimitri Calvocoressi was born in Marseille, France on 2 October 1877 to Greek parents. In his earliest years he learned French, Greek, Italian, English and later German; he noted that "I read far more English books than French." At the École Monge high school of Paris, he developed a lifelong interest in geology and mineralogy. The musicologist Gerald Abraham notes that Calvocoressi had "a number of false starts at other careers: law, banking and stockbroking". At first, he studied at the Lycée Janson de Sailly, Paris, but an Orchestre Lamoureux concert of Richard Wagner's works galvanized his interest in music. (Note: Calvocoressi's subject of study at the Lycée Janson de Sailly is variously reported in modern sources. The musicologist Gerald Abraham first records that he studied philosophy under André Lalande, but later says it was classics and that he "entered the law faculty but soon abandoned law".)

Alongside his piano lessons with Eugène Claveau, Calvocoressi frequented the Parisian concert scene, with works by Bach, Liszt, d'Indy, Wagner, and the Romantic Russian composers in particular leaving a lasting impression. He began harmony study at the Conservatoire de Paris with Xavier Leroux, where he became friends with the composer Maurice Ravel; Ravel later dedicated "Alborada del gracioso" from the piano suite Miroirs to Calvocoressi. (Note: Ravel later orchestrated this movement as a stand-alone work in 1919) Ravel also harmonized a set of Greek folk songs which Calvocoressi translated, known as Cinq mélodies populaires grecques, and may have inspired the composer's piano Sonatine. Calvocoressi, Ravel and the pianist Ricardo Viñes founded the Apaches music society. Other members were the composers Florent Schmitt, Maurice Delage and Paul Ladmirault, the poets Léon-Paul Fargue and Tristan Klingsor and the painter Paul Sordes.

== Career and later life ==
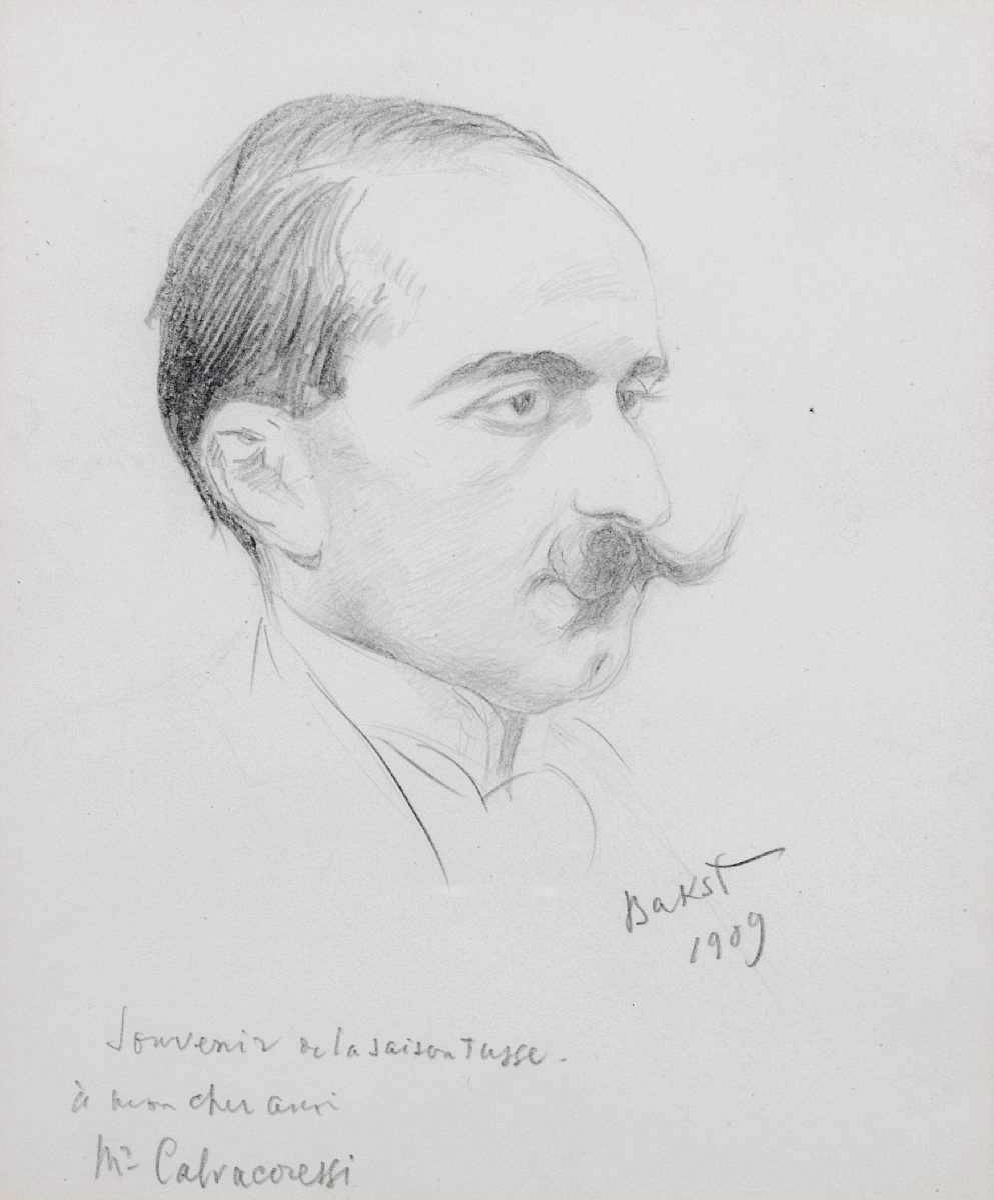
Calvocoressi in 1909 (by Léon Bakst)

Calvocoressi's music criticism career can be divided into two: a French (1902–1914) and English (1921–1944) period. Described by Abraham as "a remarkable polyglot", Calvocoressi's career beginning in 1902 was as a music critic and correspondent for several English, American, German and Russian periodicals. Encouraged by the novelist Binet-Valmer, the latter introduced him to Octave Maus, an editor of the monthly L'Art Moderne magazine. Calvocoressi became the Paris musical correspondent for L'Art Moderne and music critic for Binet-Valmer's La Renaissance latine magazine; around then he also was music critic for the Anglo-French Weekly Critical Review. Although some of these publications became obsolete in the next few years, Calvocoressi was well established enough to be unaffected. He contributed to other publications at various time: the daily Gil Blas, the fortnightly Comoedia Illustré' (part of Comœdia), the daily The Morning Post and particularly the monthly Musical Times.

Calvocoressi published his first book—a study on Franz Liszt—in 1905, the year when he began writing for the English Monthly Musical Record, began both a correspondence with the Russian composer Mily Balakirev and developed a general interest in Russian music, particularly the work of Modest Mussorgsky. He has been described by slavist Caryl Emerson and musicologist Robert William Oldani as among the most important Western scholars of Mussorgsky. From 1907 to 1910 he served as an advisor for the impresario Sergei Diaghilev, who organized Russian music and ballet concerts in Paris. For his efforts, the Russian government granted him the Order of Saint Anna, while the Soviets later elected him a member of the Academy of Sciences of the Soviet Union. He visited Russia for the first and only time in 1914, meeting with musical figures such as Alexander Glazunov. Calvocoressi lectured at the École des Hautes Études Sociales from 1905 to 1914, teaching about contemporary music. He also translated song texts, opera librettos and books from Russian and Hungarian into French and English. His next books included studies on Mussorgsky (1908), Glinka (1911) and Schumann (1912).

Calvocoressi paused music criticism at the onset of World War I in 1914, but found himself unable to serve the French due to his Greek ancestry. Later that year he moved to London and served as a cryptographer. He spent the rest of his life in England; he was naturalized and married Ethel Grey, a British citizen who was the dedicatee of many of his future books. These later studies were all in English, and their subjects included Koechlin (1923), music criticism (1923), musical taste (1925), recollections of his musical experiences (1933), Debussy (1944) as well on two studies each on Russian music (1936 & 1944) and Mussorgsky specifically (1946 & 1956). Emerson and Oldani remarked that these two Mussorgsky biographies have remained standard reference works on the composer. Although he continued music criticism in London from 1921 onwards, Abraham noted that "he never enjoyed the influence and authority in London that he had exercised in Paris".

Calvocoressi became well acquainted with "many distinguished Englishmen", including the author Arnold Bennett and the composer Ralph Vaughan Williams. In Musicians Gallery (1933) he describes introducing Vaughan Williams to Maurice Ravel in Paris during the winter of 1907–1908. Jonathan Coe presents a fictionalized portrait of Calvocoressi (as the character 'Pierre Vicente “Mylo” Mylonas') in his 2026 novel Lessons in Harmony.

He died in London on 1 February 1944, aged 66.

== Selected writings ==
=== Books ===
- Calvocoressi, Michel-Dimitri (1905). Franz Liszt: Biographique Critique [Franz Liszt: Critical Biography]. Les Musiciens célèbres (in French). Paris: H. Laurens. OCLC 1135190659.
- —— (1908). Moussorgsky. Maîtres de la musique (in French). Paris: F. Alcan. OCLC 3797891.
- —— (1911). Glinka. Les Musiciens célèbres (in French). Paris: H. Laurens. OCLC 1142939.
- —— (1912). Schumann. Les écrits et la vie anecdotique et pittoresque des grands artistes (in French). Paris: Société des éditions Louis-Michaud. OCLC 8641346.
- —— (1923). Charles Koechlin (in French). Paris: M. Senart. OCLC 19949660.
- —— (1923). The Principles and Methods of Musical Criticism. London: Oxford University Press. OCLC 558073283.
- —— (1925). Musical Taste and How to Form it. London: Oxford University Press. OCLC 909990.
- —— (1933). Musicians Gallery: Music and Ballet in Paris and London. London: Faber and Faber. OCLC 2535873.
- ——; Abraham, Gerald (1936). Masters of Russian Music. New York: Alfred A. Knopf. OCLC 926146.
- —— (1944). Debussy. London: Novello and Company. OCLC 1448206.
- —— (1944). A Survey of Russian Music. Harmondsworth: Penguin Books. OCLC 558073294.
- —— (1946). Mussorgsky. London: J. M. Dent & Sons. OCLC 1559285.
- —— (1956). Mussorgsky: His Life and Works. London: Rockliff. OCLC 2048876.

=== Articles ===
For other articles by Michel-Dimitri Calvocoressi, see § External links

- Calvocoressi, Michel-Dimitri (1 December 1913). "Maurice Ravel". The Musical Times. 54 (850): 785–787. doi:10.2307/907706. JSTOR 907706.
- —— (October 1921). "The Practice of Song-Translation". Music & Letters. 2 (4): 314–322. JSTOR 726587.
- —— (January 1941). "When Ravel Composed to Order". Music & Letters. 22 (1): 54–59. JSTOR 727827.
- —— (July 1922). "The Unknown Mussorgsky". Music & Letters. 3 (3): 237–244. JSTOR 726236.
- —— (January 1934). "Mussorgsky's Youth: In the Light of the Latest Information". The Musical Quarterly. 20 (1): 1–14. ISSN 0027-4631. JSTOR 738707.

=== Chapters ===
- Calvocoressi, Michel-Dimitri (1929). "Bibliography". In Buck, Percy (ed.). Introductory Volume. Oxford History of Music. Oxford: Oxford University Press. pp. 223–239. OCLC 633571.
