= William Martin (tenor) =

American opera singer

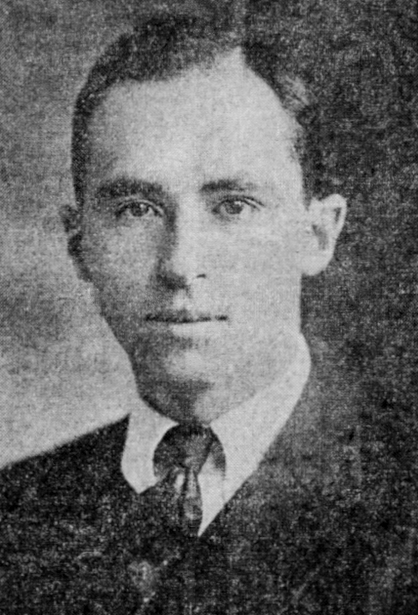
- In The Boston Globe in 1923
- Born: William Bosworth Martin; April 13, 1898; Lowell, Massachusetts, US
- Died: July 31, 1960 (aged 62); Westport, Connecticut, US
- Education: Harvard University
- Occupation: Singer

William Bosworth Martin (April 13, 1898 – July 31, 1960) was an American classical tenor.

== Biography ==
Born in Lowell, Massachusetts, he studied singing with Leveret Merrill, A Sujol, and Florence Holtzman. A graduate of Harvard University, he was for many years a member of the Harvard Glee Club. He was trained as an opera singer by Estelle Liebling, the teacher of Beverly Sills, in New York City. He made his professional opera debut in 1923 in the title role of Jules Massenet's Werther.

He was committed to the Opéra-Comique in Paris from 1925 to 1929 where he notably sang the role of Philipp in the world premiere of Lucien Chevaillier's Le poème du soir. In 1927 he and Mary McCormic became the first two Americans to appear in leading roles at the Opéra National de Paris, respectively portraying the title role and the role of Marguerite in Charles Gounod's Faust. In 1929 he had a major success at the Palais Garnier as the Duke of Mantua in Giuseppe Verdi's Rigoletto. In 1930 he sang Romeo to Grace Moore's Juliette in Gounod's Roméo et Juliette at the Opéra Royal de Wallonie. Martin is best remembered today for creating the role of Amelia's lover in the world premiere of Gian Carlo Menotti's Amelia Goes to the Ball on April 1, 1937 at the Philadelphia Academy of Music.

He died at his home in Westport, Connecticut on July 31, 1960.
