= Sara Cohen (musicologist) =

British musicologist

Sara Cohen FBA is a musicologist and academic. She completed her doctoral studies at the University of Oxford; her DPhil in social anthropology was awarded in 1987. The following year, she joined the newly founded Institute of Popular Music at the University of Liverpool as a research fellow; she has remained with the IPM since then, and is its director as of 2018. Since 2017, she has also been the James and Constance Alsop Professor of Music at the University of Liverpool. She is a specialist in ethnographic research into popular music. Her first book Rock Culture in Liverpool (1991) has been described as "a landmark publication that introduced ethnographic methodology into the heart of popular music studies ... Cohen's book was the first to focus in detail and depth on a small number of musicians and their culture".

Cohen was elected a Fellow of the British Academy in 2024.

== Selected publications ==
- Rock Culture in Liverpool: Popular Music in the Making (Oxford University Press, 1991).
- Decline, Renewal and the City in Popular Music Culture: Beyond the Beatles (Ashgate, 2007).
- (Co-authored with Robert Kronenburg) Liverpool's Musical Landscapes (Historic England, 2018).
