= Gerald Abraham =

English musicologist

Abraham in c. 1948.

Gerald Ernest Heal Abraham, CBE, FBA (9 March 1904 – 18 March 1988) was an English musicologist, editor, and music critic. He was particularly respected as an authority on Russian music.

== Early life and education ==
Gerald Ernest Heal Abraham was born at Newport, Isle of Wight, on 9 March 1904.

He initially trained for a naval career in nearby Portsmouth until ill-health forced a change of direction. He was largely self-taught in piano, as well as music theory and history, aside from some practical orchestration experience with military bands, and a year's study in Cologne, where he learned German and listened to much music.

== Career ==
=== Writing ===
In 1927, aged 23, Abraham published his first music book, a study of Alexander Borodin, although he later disowned it. There followed contributions to music periodicals and monographs on Nietzsche (1933), Tolstoy (1935), and Dostoevsky (1936). Abraham taught himself Russian and began a series of analytical articles on Russian music, collected in Studies in Russian Music (1935) and On Russian Music (1939). In collaboration with M D Calvocoressi he also wrote Masters of Russian Music (1936). Other works on Russian music include Eight Soviet Composers (1943), Tchaikovsky (a symposium, as editor, 1945), and his completion of both Calvocoressi's Mussorgsky (Master Musicians series, 1946) and his larger study Modest Mussorgsky: His Life and Works (1956).

Abraham's interests ranged beyond the Slavonic, as first shown in his introduction to contemporary music, This Modern Stuff (1933, later re-titled This Modern Music) and in A Hundred Years of Music (1938) covering the broader history of music from the death of Beethoven. He also edited collections of articles on Chopin (1939), Schubert (1946), Sibelius (1947), Grieg (1948), Schumann (1952), and Handel (1954). Slavonic and Romantic Music: Essays and Studies (1968) and Essays on Russian and East European Music (1985) collect some of his best work.

A project that spanned three decades was the New Oxford History of Music, for which Abraham acted as secretary to the editorial board. He personally edited five of the ten volumes (see list below). The first (Vol. III, Ars Nova and the Renaissance, in collaboration with Dom Anselm Hughes) came out in 1960 and the last (Vol, IX, Romanticism, 1830-1890) was published posthumously in 1990. He also oversaw its audio supplement, The History of Music in Sound, a series of gramophone recordings and handbooks, first launched in 1953. His synoptic overview, the Concise Oxford History of Music, came out in 1979 during this period, and he was also involved in the 20-volume New Grove Dictionary of Music and Musicians (1980).

=== The BBC and academia ===
In 1935 Abraham was appointed by the BBC as assistant editor of the Radio Times (1935–39) where he worked with his friend Ralph Hill, then as deputy editor of The Listener (1939–1942, and subsequently as music editor until 1962). He was Gramophone Department Director from 1942 until 1947, an important post during wartime when the BBC's broadcasting of live music was severely restricted. This led to his participation in the founding of the Third Programme in 1946.

He left the BBC for 15 years to become the inaugural James and Constance Alsop Professor of Music at Liverpool University. He returned to the BBC in 1962 to become assistant controller of music, a post he held for five years. He moved to the US in 1968 for a year as Ernest Bloch Professor of Music at the University of California at Berkeley. His lectures from this time were published as The Tradition of Western Music (1974).

== Other appointments ==
From 1958 to 1961, he served as the president of the International Society for Music Education, and later would go onto serve as the president of the Royal Musical Association (1970–74). Additionally, he served numerous other positions in both ceremonial and official statuses, including:

- Chairman, Music Section of The Critics' Circle, 1944–46
- Editor, The Monthly Musical Record, 1945–60
- Founding editor, BBC Music Guides, 1966–1974
- Music critic, The Daily Telegraph, 1967–68
- Editor, Music of the Masters (book series, publisher Lindsay Drummond)
- Chairman, Early English Church Music Committee, 1970–80
- Member, Editorial Committee, Musica Britannica
- President, International Society for Music Education, 1958–61
- Deputy chairman, Haydn Institute (Cologne), 1961–68

== Honours ==
Abraham was made a CBE in 1974.

== Personal life and death ==
In 1936 Abraham married (Isobel) Pat Robinson. They had one daughter, Frances, and lived for many years in Hampstead (at 106 Frognal, Walter Besant's old house), where they held many hospitable "open evenings" of music. Later they returned to the Isle of Wight (to the village of Brighstone), and from the early 1960s to the Old School House, Ebernoe, near Petworth in Sussex.

HE died at the King Edward VII Hospital, Midhurst, on 18 March 1988, aged 84.

In the Musical Times Alec Hyatt King remembered him as "unforgettable...burly of stature and with a rumbustious sense of humour: seldom did he come off second best". David Brown called him "perhaps the greatest of those "amateurs" so profoundly important in English musical scholarship".

== Publications ==
- This Modern Stuff, 1933
- Nietzsche, 1933
- Studies in Russian Music, 1935
- Tolstoy, 1935
- Masters of Russian Music (with Michel Dimitri Calvocoressi), 1936
- Dostoevsky, 1936
- A Hundred Years of Music, 1938
- On Russian Music, 1939
- Chopin's Musical Style, 1939
- Beethoven's Second-Period Quartets, 1942
- Eight Soviet Composers, 1943
- Tchaikovsky: a symposium 1945
- Rimsky-Korsakov: a symposium 1945
- Sibelius: a symposium 1947
- Grieg: a symposium 1948
- Schubert: a symposium 1952
- Design in Music, 1949
- Schumann: a symposium 1952
- Handel: a symposium 1954
- Slavonic and Romantic Music, 1968
- The Tradition of Western Music, 1974
- The Master Musicians: Mussorgsky (with Michel Dimitri Calvocoressi), 1974
- The Concise Oxford History of Music, 1979
- Essays on Russian and East European Music, 1984
- New Oxford History of Music (as editor):
  - Vol. III (Ars Nova and the Renaissance), 1960
  - Vol. IV (The Age of Humanism), 1968
  - Vol. VI (Concert Music: 1630-1750), 1985
  - Vol. VIII (The Age of Beethoven), 1982
  - Vol, IX (Romanticism (1830–1890), 1990
