= Les Apaches =

20th-century artistic group formed in Paris

Les Apaches (or Société des Apaches) was a group of musicians, writers and artists which formed in Paris, France, in 1903. The core was formed by the French composer Maurice Ravel, the Spanish pianist Ricardo Viñes and the writer and critic Michel-Dimitri Calvocoressi. The group was private but never formal, and the wider membership was fluid; over 20 unofficial members would attend meetings of Les Apaches until it came to an end during World War I. During their active years, Les Apaches met weekly. The meetings were a chance for the members to perform and show new works or ideas to a small group, discuss contemporary artistic interests and collaborate.

== Origins ==
In the early 20th century the term Les Apaches was used to describe European street gangs who were of intense interest to the French media at the time. Supposedly, the term was adopted by the diverse circle of artists after a newspaper seller mockingly called "attention! Les Apaches" as members of the group were returning from the premiere of Claude Debussy's opera Pelléas et Mélisande, a work they praised and rallied around. It is possible that this was an ironic insult or a reference to their modernist artistic output. They found the name amusing, especially as they saw art as being at odds with conservative tastes.

The precise beginnings of the group are unclear. Many of the regular members were approximate contemporaries, most had met previously and some had been friends for over a decade; four members had been taught by the French composer Gabriel Fauré and it is likely that some of the other artists had met at the École des beaux-arts or in Salon exhibitions. Throughout 1901, Émile Vuillermoz hosted regular musical events at his home, and members had gathered at events such as the premiere of Ravel's Jeux d'eau - by the time the group was calling itself Les Apaches there was already a circle of artists who met regularly.

== Active years ==
The first theme of Borodin's second symphony (whistled)

From around 1903, the group met each Saturday. For several years, the meetings usually took place in the city studio of the painter Paul Sordes (dubbed 'Ravel with a palette'), a neighbor of the composer Claude Debussy. They later moved to a property that the French composer Maurice Delage rented. Ravel suggested that they adopt the first melody of Borodin's 2nd Symphony as their theme, an idea with which they all agreed. To enter Sordes' apartment or attract the attention of other Apaches after concerts, the member would have to whistle the first few bars of the music; Rimsky-Korsakov's Scheherazade was the initial choice, although it was deemed too difficult to whistle.

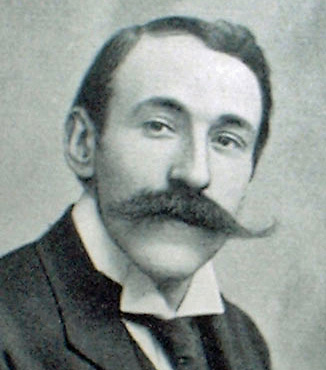
Ricardo Viñes in 1901

Many in the group were amateurs and enthusiasts of the arts from which they did not make a living, and so the members were not limited to one artistic faction within Les Apaches. The meetings were lively, and would often last until the early hours of the morning; they would discuss art, argue about contemporary issues, perform music for each other (Viñes being the favoured pianist), play duets together, read poetry, drink coffee and smoke. Symbolism, Javanese music, Russian composers, Edgar Allan Poe, Stéphane Mallarmé and Paul Cézanne were all topics that fascinated Les Apaches. The music of Debussy was a particular passion. Ideas and fragments of larger unfinished works would often be performed or shown at the meetings; this mingling of ideas would influence several Apaches and lead to various artistic collaborations. The meetings of the group were vibrant occasions, and when other neighbors complained about the noise so late at night, the group began meeting in a more isolated hut rented by Delage, which they called their 'wigwam'. Outside of the meetings, the members would support each other; Viñes premiered works by the composers, the critics would encourage new music, and the poets would collaborate with the musicians to set words to music.

Audio recording from Ravel's Miroirs. Ravel dedicated each movement to a member of Les Apaches; Noctuelles was dedicated to Léon-Paul Fargue.
I. Noctuelles (4:19)

The wider membership of the group was always shifting. The group (or as they called themselves, 'the band') attracted many members during its existence, some who would meet with the group occasionally, and others whose association with Les Apaches was brief. (Note: According to Viñes' diary, only those who regularly met in Delage's hut were truly considered to be part of Les Apaches.) Despite this somewhat fluid nature of Les Apaches, the group was highly exclusive in other ways; women were strictly forbidden. Due to the nature of the group, many of the members became close. Ravel, who dedicated each movement of Miroirs to a member of Les Apaches, used the French familiar form tu with only three friends outside his close family - all of them were part of Les Apaches. There is speculation that the one romantic relationship in Ravel's life was with the poet and fellow apache Léon-Paul Fargue.

In 1910, the Russian composer Igor Stravinsky became a member of Les Apaches. According to Stravinsky's letters, he frequently visited Paris, staying at the home of his closest friend in the city, Maurice Delage, who helped him deliver manuscripts and set up interviews with the press. In a letter to the apache composer Florent Schmitt, Stravinsky noted that for a time he only listened to the music of Ravel, Schmitt, and Debussy.

Although some of the members remained friends, the meetings petered out during World War I and eventually stopped altogether.

=== Debussy and Les Apaches ===
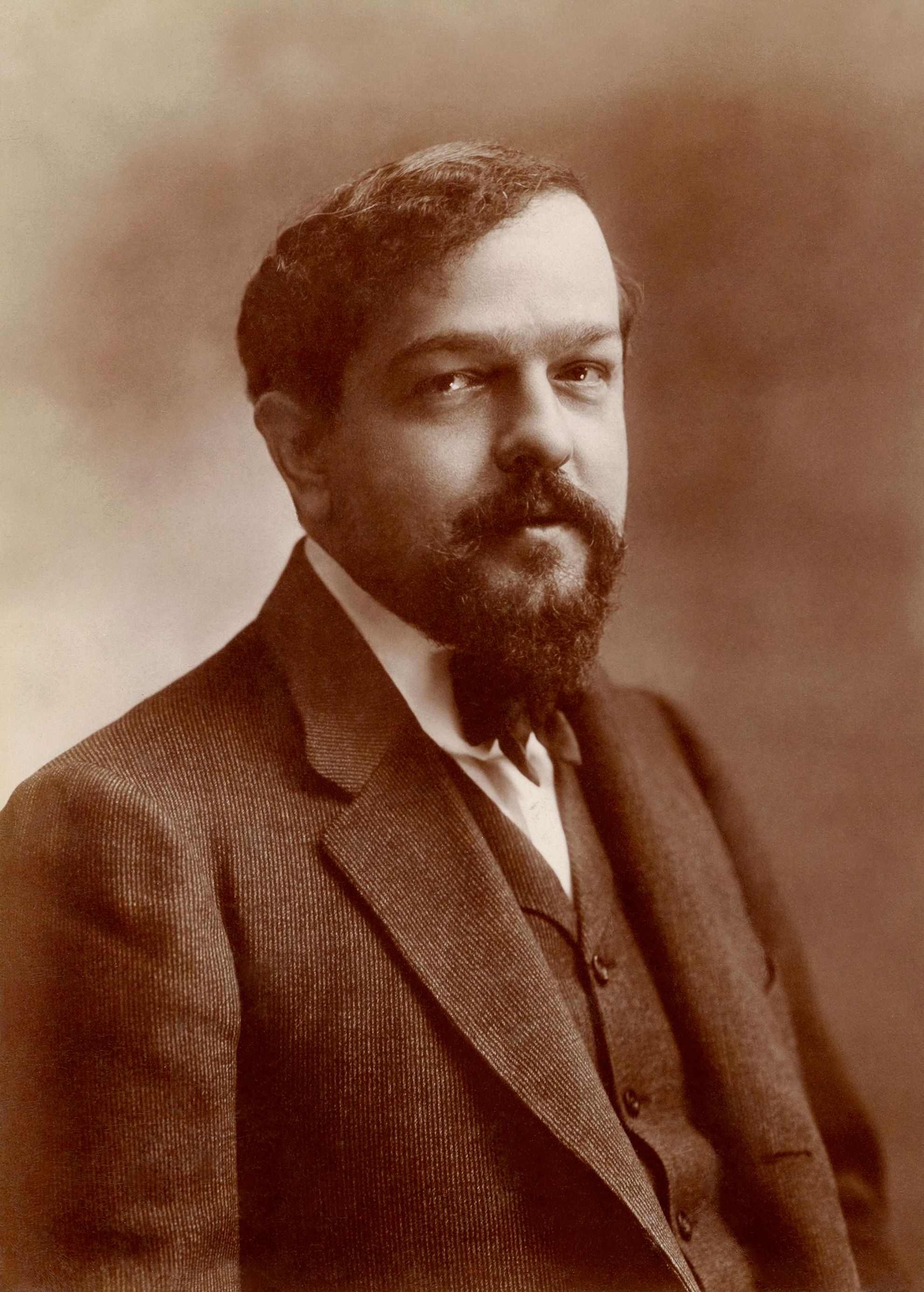
Claude Debussy, c. 1900

Contrary to popular belief, Claude Debussy was never part of Les Apaches. However, the music of Debussy was of particular importance within Les Apaches, who all greatly admired his compositions, supporting them when they received unfavourable reviews. Pelléas et Mélisande was a work they openly admired despite the mixed critical reception. Ravel was a particular fan, attending every one of the opera's performances in its first run - a total of fourteen.

Debussy's music also featured in the meetings held by Les Apaches. Ravel had made transcriptions of Debussy's Nocturnes and his Prélude à l'après-midi d'un faune (Note: Ravel described Prélude à l'après-midi d'un faune as "the only piece in music that is absolutely perfect" and expressed his wish that it be played at his funeral.) for two pianos and piano duet respectively, compositions praised by fellow Apaches. Although Debussy was not close with any one of the Apaches, he was acquainted with several members. The most notable relationship Debussy had with an Apache was Viñes, with whom Debussy had a professional relationship for several years. Viñes (a pianist Debussy admired) regularly premiered Debussy works and, during his regular meetings with Debussy, Viñes would perform works by Ravel for him. Through Viñes, Les Apaches were indirectly linked with Debussy.

Ravel was often compared with Debussy, and the followers of the composers began to form rough factions; those who supported the younger Ravel, and those who defended Debussy. Similarities in the music of the two composers, as well as the association through Viñes, lead to accusations of plagiarism by Ravel. Les Apaches had always been avid supporters of Debussy, although made a point of defending Ravel when it was claimed that he had imitated Debussy.

== See also ==
- Georges Mouveau

== Sources ==
- Borotra, Natalie Morel (1996). "Ravel et les groupes des Apaches" (PDF). Música. 8: 145–158. ISSN 0213-0815.
- Calvocoressi, Michel-Dimitri (1933). Musicians gallery: music and ballet in Paris and London;. London: Faber and Faber Ltd. OCLC 2535873.
- Dufourt, Hugues (1990). La musique: du théorique au politique (in French). Paris: Aux Amateurs de Livres. ISBN 978-2-87841-046-4.
- Gordon, Barbara N (2009). "Discovering Maurice Delage". Journal of Singing. 65 (3): 297–313. ProQuest 228993301.
- Goss, Madeleine (1940). "Les Apaches". Bolero: the life of Maurice Ravel. New York: H. Holt and Company. OCLC 1156370515.
- Johnson, Graham; Stokes, Richard (2002). A French Song Companion. Oxford: Oxford University Press. ISBN 9780199249664. OCLC 1036173270.
- Kelly, Barbara L; Murphy, Kerry, eds. (2017). Berlioz and Debussy : sources, contexts and legacies : essays in honour of François Lesure. New York: Routledge. ISBN 978-1-351-57417-4.
- Maurat, Edmond; Roux, Louis (1977). Souvenirs musicaux et littéraires (in French). Saint-Étienne: Centre interdisciplinaire d'études et de recherches sur l'expression contemporaine. OCLC 644065642.
- McAuliffe, Mary (2014). Twilight of the Belle Epoque : the Paris of Picasso, Stravinsky, Proust, Renault, Marie Curie, Gertrude Stein, and Their Friends through the Great War. Lanham: Rowman & Littlefield Publishers. ISBN 978-1-4422-2164-2.
- Nichols, Roger (1977). Ravel. London: J.M. Dent. ISBN 978-0-460-02189-0.
- Nichols, Roger (1987). Ravel Remembered. London: Faber. ISBN 978-0-571-14986-5. (registration required)
- Puri, Michael J. (2011). Ravel the Decadent:Memory, Sublimation, and Desire. Oxford; New York: Oxford University Press. ISBN 978-0-19-973537-2.
- Ravel, Maurice; Orenstein, Arbie (2003). A Ravel reader: correspondence, articles, interviews. Mineola, New York: Dover Publications. ISBN 978-0-486-43078-2. (registration required)
- Pasler, Jann (1982). "Stravinsky and the Apaches". The Musical Times. 123 (1672): 403–407. doi:10.2307/964115. JSTOR 964115.
- Roust, Colin (2020). Georges Auric: a life in music and politics. New York: Oxford University Press. ISBN 978-0-19-060777-7.
- de Séverac, Déodat; Guillot, Pierre (1993). Écrits sur la musique (in French). Liege: Mardaga. ISBN 978-2-87009-544-7.
