= James and Constance Alsop Professor of Music =

Named chair at University of Liverpool

The James and Constance Alsop Professorship of Music at the University of Liverpool was established in 1946; prior to that time, music teaching had been confined to the Department of Education but the new chair marked an attempt to "coordinate the study of music within the University and stimulate interest by lectures and other appropriate instruction". The first holder was Gerald Abraham, who had been director of the BBC's Gramophone Department. The chair was named for Alderman James W. Alsop, OBE, a major figure in the university's establishment and early administration.

The chair replaced the James W. Alsop Lectureship, which had been established by Alsop's widow Constance in 1924; she endowed it with the sum of £3,000. Appointments were made for a year "it having been decided at present [by 1928] to invite each year a distinguished musician to deliver a course of public lectures on Music". The lectureship was suspended during the Second World War; once the chair was established, the lectures were given by the professor and after Basil Smallman's appointment in 1965 they were reformed into the Alsop Concerts.

== James W. Alsop Lectureship ==
- 1925: Gustav Holst.
- 1926: Sir George Dyson, KCVO.
- 1927: William Gillies Whittaker.
- 1928: Sir Percy C. Buck.
- 1929: William Gillies Whittaker.
- 1930: Thomas F. Dunhill.
- 1931: Sir Hamilton Harty.
- 1932: Canon E. H. Fellowes, CH, MVO.
- 1933: Geoffrey Shaw.
- 1934: Ernest Newman.
- 1935: J. F. Toye.
- 1936: Sir Stanley Marchant, CVO, FSA.
- 1937: Sir Donald Tovey.
- 1938: Albert Coates.

== James and Constance Alsop Professors of Music ==
- 1947–1962: Gerald Ernest Heal Abraham, CBE, FBA.
- 1964–1985: (Frederic) Basil (Rowley) Smallman.
- 1986–2003: Michael Owen Talbot, FBA.
- 2005–2015: Anahid Kassabian. (Note: A CV on her personal website shows these dates. She was appointed to the post after March 2004 and before May 2006 according to archived versions of the University of Liverpool's Department of Music staff directory; she was in the post until at least November 2014 but had left the Department by August 2016.)
- 2017–present: Sara Cohen.
