= Basil Smallman =

British musicologist (1921–2001)

Frederic Basil Rowley Smallman (30 June 1921 – 8 December 2001), commonly known as Basil Smallman, was an English music scholar.

Born in Croydon on 30 June 1921, Smallman was educated at Cranleigh School, New College, Oxford, and the Royal College of Music. After war service, he completed the Bachelor of Music degree at Oxford in 1946–47, and then completed a Diploma in Education in 1947. He was then the music master at Malvern College between 1947 and 1949, before he was appointed to a lectureship in music at the University of Nottingham in 1950; for a time after 1955 he also worked as an accompanist with the BBC. Promotion to a senior lectureship at Nottingham in 1961 was followed in 1964 by his appointment to the James and Constance Alsop Chair of Music at the University of Liverpool. He was Dean of the Faculty of Arts there between 1969 and 1971, Public Orator between 1972 and 1973, and Pro-Vice-Chancellor between 1973 and 1976; on retirement in 1985, he was appointed an emeritus professor. Smallman was especially interested in the German Baroque Passion and Heinrich Schütz; in retirement, he expanded his academic output, and published three monographs. He had a wife Ann, née Hesketh-Williams, with whom he had three children. He died on 8 December 2001.

== Selected publications ==
- The Background of Passion Music (SCM Press, 1957; 2nd ed. 1970).
- The Music of Heinrich Schütz (Mayflower Enterprises, 1985).
- The Piano Trio: History, Technique, and Repertoire (Clarendon Press, 1990).
- The Piano Quartet and Quintet: Style, Structure, and Scoring (Clarendon Press, 1994).
- Schütz, Master Musicians Series (Oxford University Press, 2000).
