= Lucien Haudebert =

French/Breton composer

Lucien Haudebert (10 April 1877 – 24 February 1963) was a French composer who strongly identified with his Breton heritage.

== Life ==
Haudebert was born in Fougères, Département Ille-et-Vilaine, Brittany. He received his first music lessons at age 5 from the local organist at the Catholic church of Saint Léonard and was able to play his first Bach prelude at age 7. He studied philosophy at a college in Laval and subsequently received a degree in business studies (Diplôme des Hautes Études Commerciales), following his father's wishes. He spent his military service at Vitré until September 1900.

Musically largely self-taught, against his parents' wishes he then went to Paris where he made the acquaintance of Gabriel Fauré, then organist at the Eglise de la Madeleine, and received private lessons from him, cut short by his suffering from anemia. Roman Catholic himself, he married his Protestant wife Mary (1879–1958) in Paris in 1907, a poet who often provided the words for Haudebert's songs and choral pieces. He participated in World War I, leaving the army as lieutenant.

He spent his life mainly in Paris where he died.

== Music ==
The strength of Haudebert's music lay in his melodic inventiveness and his music's "singability". Although he created a large oeuvre of orchestral and chamber music, his vocal and choral music are regarded as his main achievement. His greatest success was the oratorio Dieu vainqueur for vocal soloists, mixed chorus, organ and orchestra, given with 600 participants in December 1927 at Mannheim, Germany.

Harmonically conservative, he wrote in a late Romantic style, often coloured by Breton folk music, particularly in his instrumental music. He was a member of the short-lived Association des Compositeurs Bretons and often participated in Breton cultural events in Paris.

He was awarded the Prix Paul Dukas in 1945. He was a personal friend of a number of other Breton composers as well as of composers Ernest Bloch and Swan Hennessy and the writer Romain Rolland.

== Selected works ==
=== Vocal music ===
- La Rose et les papillons (1898), song
- Dieu vainqueur, Op. 15 (1916) for soli, chorus, organ, orchestra
- Dans la maison (1921), songs
- Huit chants intimes (1921), songs
- Églogue (1921, pub. 1922), for voice, flute, piano
- Gethsémani (1921, pub. 1922), for voice, violin, organ
- Ma lande au grand soleil (1923) for choir
- Le Cahier d'Elisabeth (1924), songs
- Chant de Pâques, Op. 23 (1925) for soli, chorus, organ, orchestra
- Trois Évocations (1925) for voice, flute, string quartet
- Nativité, Op. 25 (1926) for soli, chorus, organ, piano
- Ode à la musique, Op. 28 (1927) for female choir and orchestra
- Moïse, Op. 29 (1928) for baritone solo, choir, orchestra
- Requiem, Op. 31 (n. d., unpublished) for soli, chorus, organ, orchestra
- Ubi caritas (1934) for two voices and organ
- Chants funèbres, Op. 45 (1934), songs
- Chants spirituelles, Op. 42 (1936), songs
- Cantique à sainte Thérèse, Op. 47 (1939) for voice and piano or organ
- Nocturne Été, Op. 57 (1943), song
- Te Deum, Op. 59 (1948) for soli, chorus, organ, orchestra

=== Orchestral music ===
- La Sacrifice d'Abraham, Op. 11, symphonic poem (pub. 1921)
- La Fille de Jephté, Op. 27 (1926), symphonic poem
- Symphonie bretonne, Op. 44 (1936)
- La Reve inachevé, Op. 49 (1937), incidental music
- Saint Louis, Op. 50 (1938), incidental music
- Voyages en Bretagne. 9 Pièces symphoniques, Op. 55 (n. d.)
- Poème celtique, Op. 56 (1943) for violin and orchestra
- Jeanne d'Arc de Domrémy, Op. 58 (1944), incidental music
- Rapsodie celtique, Op. 64 (1956) for wind orchestra

=== Chamber music ===
- Bienvenue à Claudie, Op. 9, for string quartet (published 1931)
- Berceuses (1920) for violin and piano
- Prélude et variation (1920) for violin and piano

=== Piano music ===
- Cinq petites pièces (1924)
- Le Cahier d'Eve, Op. 30 (1928, pub. 1930)

== Bibliography ==
- André Tessier: Lucien Haudebert et son oeuvre (Paris: Max Eschig & Maurice Sénart, not dated [1928])
