= Jeux d'eau (Ravel) =

Piano composition by Maurice Ravel

- by Maurice Ravel
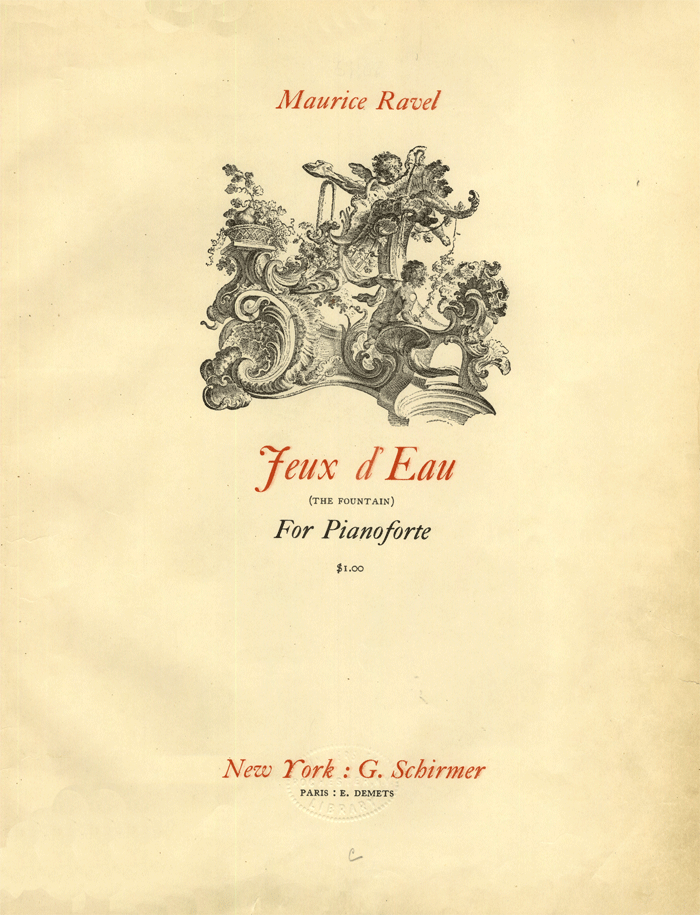
- Title page of the score (ed. G. Schirmer).
- Catalogue: M. 30
- Composed: 1901
- Dedication: Gabriel Fauré

Premiere
- Date: 5 April 1902; 124 years ago
- Location: Salle Pleyel, Paris
- Performers: Ricardo Viñes

Jeux d'eau (pronounced [ʒø do]) is a piece for solo piano by Maurice Ravel, composed in 1901 and given its first public performance the following year. The title is variously translated as "Fountains", "Playing Water", or literally "Water Games". At the time of writing Jeux d'eau, Ravel was a student of Gabriel Fauré, to whom this piece is dedicated. The work is in a single movement, typically lasting between four and a half and six minutes in performance.

Jeux d'eau has a claim to being the first example of impressionism in piano music. The piece is known for its virtuosic, fluid, and highly evocative nature, and is considered one of Ravel's most important works for piano. The piece is characterized by its fast, shimmering, and cascading piano figurations, which are meant to evoke the sound of flowing water. The overall atmosphere of Jeux d'eau is one of lightness, playfulness, and sensuousness, and the piece is often described as a musical depiction of the joy and beauty of nature. Jeux d'eau is considered a masterful example of Ravel's distinctive style, which is characterized by its clarity, precision, and sensitivity to color and texture.

== Background and first performances ==
In 1901, Maurice Ravel was aged 26 and had yet to make an impression on the French musical scene. He had failed to win any prizes as a student at the Paris Conservatoire and was expelled on that account. As a former student he was permitted to attend the classes of his teacher Gabriel Fauré, who thought highly of him and encouraged him. Ravel dedicated Jeux d'eau and his String Quartet "à mon cher maître Gabriel Fauré".

Jeux d'eau represented what Ravel's biographer Gerald Larner calls "a sudden surge in Ravel's imagination" after the mostly unremarkable compositions that preceded it. The piece was partly inspired by Franz Liszt's Les jeux d'eau à la Villa d'Este (from his Années de pèlerinage). Another inspiration may have been the poem "Fête d'eaux" by Ravel's friend Henri de Régnier. It contains the line "Dieu fluvial riant de l'eau qui le chatouille" ("river god laughing at the water that tickles him"), which at the composer's request the poet inscribed on Ravel's manuscript, and is the epigraph to the printed score.

Ravel gave the first performance of the work at a gathering of the avant-garde artistic group Les Apaches of which he was a member. The pianist Vlado Perlemuter quoted one of those present as saying, "There was a strange fire, a whole panoply of subtleties and vibrations which none of us could previously have imagined". Perlemuter commented that the piece "opens up new horizons in piano technique, especially if one remembers that Debussy's Jardins sous la pluie was not written until two years later, in 1903". The work was published by Eugène Demets in 1901. It was quickly denounced by musical conservatives, including Camille Saint-Saëns − who dismissed it as "total cacophony" − and most of the faculty of the Conservatoire.

The first public performance was given by the pianist Ricardo Viñes in a concert presented by the Société nationale de musique on 5 April 1902, at which Ravel's Pavane pour une infante défunte was also premiered. Pierre Lalo, the music critic of Le Temps (who later became persistently hostile to Ravel) was favourably impressed. After commending Viñes's "singular virtuosity and delicacy" he praised the two Ravel works as "orderly, composed with great clarity and measure, while keeping the same refinement in harmony". He continued:

The ideas have grace, and they are extremely dextrously and pleasingly written. We can see here and there the influence of Chabrier, and more often that of C. Debussy; it is natural that M. Ravel is still being influenced. But the progress he has made is worth noting.

Ravel's biographer Arbie Orenstein comments that among the other critics and the public the Pavane was found elegant and charming, but Jeux d'eau was thought to be cacophonic and excessively complicated. "It now appears that the Pavane is a minor work, as the composer himself acknowledged, while Jeux d'eau is firmly established as an important landmark in the literature of the piano".

== Music ==
Jeux d'eau
Played by Anna Heller, 2016.

The piece, in E major, is in a single movement. It opens "très doux" ("very soft"), with a metronome marking of = 144. The duration of the piece varies considerably in performance, from 4 1/2 minutes to more than 6. (Note: Timings from a sample of the performances listed in the recordings section include: 4′31″ (Casadesus), 4′35″ (Cortot), 4′40″ (Richter), 4′47″ (Gieseking), 5′10″ (Grimaud), 5′14″ (Perlemuter), 5′32″ (Thibaudet), 5′40″ (Fevrier), 5′48″ (Rogé), 6′02″ (François) and 6′03″ (Aimard).). Orenstein summarises the structure: "the opening and closing sonorities of Jeux d'eau are the major seventh chord, which enjoys a privileged position throughout". In Orenstein's analysis the work is based on two themes, the second of which is pentatonic, "treated quite freely". After an extensive development section, the two themes return and the work ends in "a sweeping cascade" of sixty-fourth notes. Ravel makes pronounced use of the higher and lower registers of the keyboard. (Note: According to the piano makers Bösendorfer, Ravel intended the work for an instrument with an extended keyboard, allowing lower bass notes than standard models. Orenstein comments that it is possible that at one point in the development section Ravel would have wanted a low G♯ "(which of course does not exist on the piano), as the following two pages and the recapitulation are underpinned by a pedal point on G♯".) (Note: There are also general questions as to whether French pianos such as those of Erard have advantages when playing Ravel over the more frequently recorded Steinways. In 2012 Paolo Giacometti made parallel recordings of some of Ravel's piano music on a Steinway and an Erard; reviewers found this release (which did not include Jeux d'eau) interesting.)

== Recordings ==
Recordings of Jeux d'eau include:

From the 78 r.p.m. era:

- Robert Casadesus (1928)
- Benno Moiseiwitsch (1929)
- Alfred Cortot (1931)
- Eileen Joyce (1941)

From the mono LP era:

- Vlado Perlemuter (1955)
- Sviatoslav Richter (1954)
- Walter Gieseking (1955)

From the stereo LP era:

- Martha Argerich (1961)
- Samson François (1967)
- Jacques Février 1971
- Pascal Rogé (1975)
- Jean-Philippe Collard (1980)

From the CD era:

- Jean-Yves Thibaudet (1985)
- Louis Lortie (1989)
- Pierre-Laurent Aimard (2011)
- Hélène Grimaud (2016).
- Bertrand Chamayou (2016)

== Notes, references and sources ==
=== Sources ===
- Jourdan-Morhange, Hélène (2005). Ravel According to Ravel. London: Kahn & Averill. ISBN 978-1-871082-78-4.
- Larner, Gerald (1996). Maurice Ravel. London: Phaidon. ISBN 978-0-7148-3270-8.
- Orenstein, Arbie (1991). Ravel: Man and Musician. London: Constable. ISBN 978-0-486-26633-6.
- Ravel, Maurice (c. 1901). Jeux d'Eau. London: Schott. OCLC 503193531.
- Sackville-West, Edward; Shawe-Taylor, Desmond (1955). The Record Guide. London: Collins. OCLC 474839729.
