= Miroirs =

Piano suite by Maurice Ravel

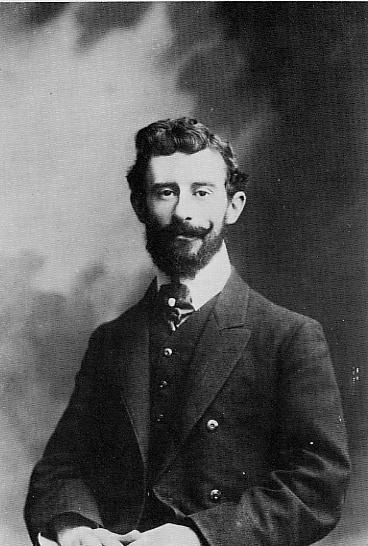
Ravel in 1907

Miroirs (French: [miʁwaʁ], lit. 'Mirrors') is a five-movement suite for solo piano written by French composer Maurice Ravel between 1904 and 1905. First performed by Ricardo Viñes in 1906, Miroirs contains five movements, each dedicated to a fellow member of the French avant-garde artist group Les Apaches.

== History ==
Around 1900, Maurice Ravel joined a group of innovative young artists, poets, critics, and musicians referred to as Les Apaches or "hooligans", a term coined by Ricardo Viñes to refer to his band of "artistic outcasts". To pay tribute to his fellow artists, Ravel began composing Miroirs in 1904 and finished it the following year. It was first published by Eugène Demets in 1906. The third and fourth movements were subsequently orchestrated by Ravel, while the fifth was orchestrated by Percy Grainger, among others.

== Structure ==
Audio recording of Miroirs
I. Noctuelles (4:19)

II. Oiseaux tristes (3:34)

III. Une barque sur l'océan (6:43)

IV. Alborada del gracioso (5:57)

V. La vallée des cloches (4:43)
Performed in 2014 by Olena Havyuk-Sheremet

Miroirs has five movements, each dedicated to a member of Les Apaches:

1. "Noctuelles" ("Night Moths"). D♭ major. Dedicated to Léon-Paul Fargue, Noctuelles is a highly chromatic work, maintaining a dark, nocturnal mood throughout. The middle section is calm with rich, chordal melodies, and the recapitulation takes place a fifth below the first entry.
2. "Oiseaux tristes" ("Sad Birds"). E♭ minor. Dedicated to Ricardo Viñes, this movement represents a lone bird whistling a sad tune, after which others join in. The rambunctious middle section is offset by a solemn cadenza which brings back the melancholy mood of the beginning.
3. "Une barque sur l'océan" ("A Boat on the Ocean"). F♯ minor. Written for Paul Sordes, the piece recounts a boat as it sails upon the waves of the ocean. Arpeggiated sections and sweeping melodies imitate the flow of ocean currents. It is the longest piece of the set.
4. "Alborada del gracioso" (Spanish: "The Jester's Aubade/ Morning Song of the Jester"). D minor — D major. Dedicated to Michel-Dimitri Calvocoressi, Alborada is a technically challenging piece that incorporates Spanish musical themes into its complicated melodies.
5. "La vallée des cloches" ("The Valley of Bells"). C♯ minor. Dedicated to Maurice Delage, the piece evokes the sounds of various bells through its use of sonorous harmonies.

== Orchestrated versions ==
"Une barque sur l'océan" and "Alborada del gracioso" were orchestrated by Ravel himself.

"La vallée des cloches" has been orchestrated by Ernesto Halffter for triple woodwind, four horns, timpani, percussion, two harps, celesta and strings; by Percy Grainger for a typical Grainger ensemble with multiple pianos and percussion, plus strings; and by Colin Matthews (along with Oiseaux tristes) for large orchestra.

"Oiseaux tristes" has been scored by Felix Günther for double woodwind plus piccolo, two horns, two trumpets, percussion, harp, celesta and strings; though aimed at intermediate rather than advanced players, transposed down a semitone and with some of Ravel's rhythms simplified. In 2001 American conductor Leif Bjaland orchestrated "Oiseaux tristes" scored for 2 flutes, 2 oboes, English horn, 2 clarinets, bass clarinet, 2 bassoons, 4 horns, harp, and strings.

The earliest known orchestration of "Noctuelles" is by the British pianist Michael Round, an orchestration commissioned by Vladimir Ashkenazy and recorded by him with the NHK Symphony Orchestra (Exton, 1993). In orchestrated form "Noctuelles" is scored for triple woodwind (including E♭ clarinet) minus one contrabassoon; four horns, three trumpets, three trombones and tuba, timpani, percussion, two harps, celesta and strings. There is a more recent orchestration (2001) of "Noctuelles" by American composer Steven Stucky. It is published by Theodore Presser Company and is scored for 3 flutes (3rd doubling piccolo), 3 oboes (3rd doubling English horn), 2 clarinets, 3 bassoons (3rd doubling contrabassoon), 4 horns, 3 trumpets, 3 trombones, tuba, timpani, 2 percussionists, celesta, two harps, and strings.

In 2003 the British composer Simon Clarke made an orchestration of the three movements that Ravel did not orchestrate.

Colin Matthews was commissioned by the BBC Philharmonic Orchestra in 2015 to orchestrate Oiseaux Tristes for first performance at the BBC Proms conducted by Nicholas Collon. This was followed by La Vallée des Cloches in 2017, performed by the same orchestra together with Oiseaux Tristes and Steven Stucky’s orchestration of Noctuelles.

== See also ==
- List of compositions by Maurice Ravel
