= Eugène Demets =

French music publisher

Eugène Louis Demets (6 April 1858 – 25 April 1923) was one of the most prestigious music publishers in early 20th-century Paris.

== Life ==
Demets was born in Passy, west of Paris. Originally an orchestral musician, Demets set up his music publishing house in Paris in 1899, first in 20, rue des Marais, and from 1903 in 2, rue de Louvois. He was not able to join SACEM, the French publishers association, before 24 April 1901, because he had apparently several times issued defamatory remarks towards that association. Only after he had formally apologised, he was admitted.

In addition to his publishing activities, he also operated an "Agence musicale", an agency organising concerts, mainly for the purpose of bringing his publications to the public.

Within a short period of time, Demets was able to enlist a number of well known modern composers for his catalogue, including Maurice Ravel, Erik Satie, and Joaquin Turina, as well as a number of lesser known, yet original composers such as Paul Bazelaire, Mel Bonis, Jean Cras, Swan Hennessy, Paul Ladmirault, and Rhené-Baton. In 1920, he was also the original publisher of the "Album des 6" of the group of composers called Les Six. Alongside Durand, Leduc and Sénart, Demets was regarded as one of the most prestigious French music publishers of his day.

After Demets' death in Paris at age 65, his catalogue was taken over and successfully expanded by Max Eschig.

== Selected publications ==
- Maurice Ravel: Pavane pour une infante défunte (1900)
- Maurice Ravel: Jeux d'eau (1902)
- Maurice Ravel: Miroirs (1906)
- Erik Satie: Préludes flasques (pour un chien) [in English: "Flabby Preludes (for a Dog)]" (1912)
- Erik Satie: Descriptions automatiques (1913)
- Erik Satie: Nocturnes (1920)
- Joaquín Turina: Sevilla, Op. 2 (1908)
- Joaquín Turina: Sonate romantique (Sonata romantica), Op. 3 (1909)
- Joaquín Turina: Coins de Seville (Rincones sevillanos), Op. 5 (1911)
- Auric/Durey/Honegger/Milhaud/Poulenc/Tailleferre: Album des 6 (1920)
