= Ernst Bachrich =

Austrian musician

Ernst Bachrich (30 May 1892 – 11 July 1942) was an Austrian composer, conductor, and pianist.

He composed piano music, chamber music and Lieder.

== Biography ==
Born in 1892 or 1893 in Vienna, he studied law at the University of Vienna.

He studied music with Carl Prohaska and Carl Lafite. He studied privately with Arnold Schoenberg from June 1916 to September 1917. In 1917 and 1918 he took part in Schoenberg's composition seminar.

He was conductor at the Vienna Volksoper from 1920 to 1925.

In 1928 he became Kapellmeister at the Düsseldorf city theatre and in 1931 he took up the same post in Duisburg.

In 1936 he collaborated with Marcel Rubin and Friedrich Wildgans to organize a series of concerts in Vienna, entitled "Music of the Present".

On 15 May 1942 he was deported by the Nazis to Izbica. He was murdered on 10 or 11 July 1942 in the Majdanek/Lublin concentration camp.
