= Joséphin Soulary =

French poet (1815–1891)

Joséphin (Joseph Marie) Soulary (23 February 1815 - 28 March 1891), French poet, son of a Lyon merchant of Genoese origin (Solari).

== Background ==
Soulray was born in Lyon on 23rd February 1815. He entered a line regiment when he was sixteen, serving for five years, during which he published his first poems. Some small lyrical works of a patriotic nature were published under the pseudonym "S. Grenadier" in the journal L'Indicateur de Bordeaux.

He was Chef de Bureau in the prefecture of the Rhône from 1845 to 1867, and, in 1868, he became librarian to the Palais des Arts in his native town. He became a member of the Parnassiens, with Alphonse Lemerre including some of Soulary's poems in the 1871 and 1876 volumes of the collection Le Parnasse contemporain. Soulary died at Lyon.

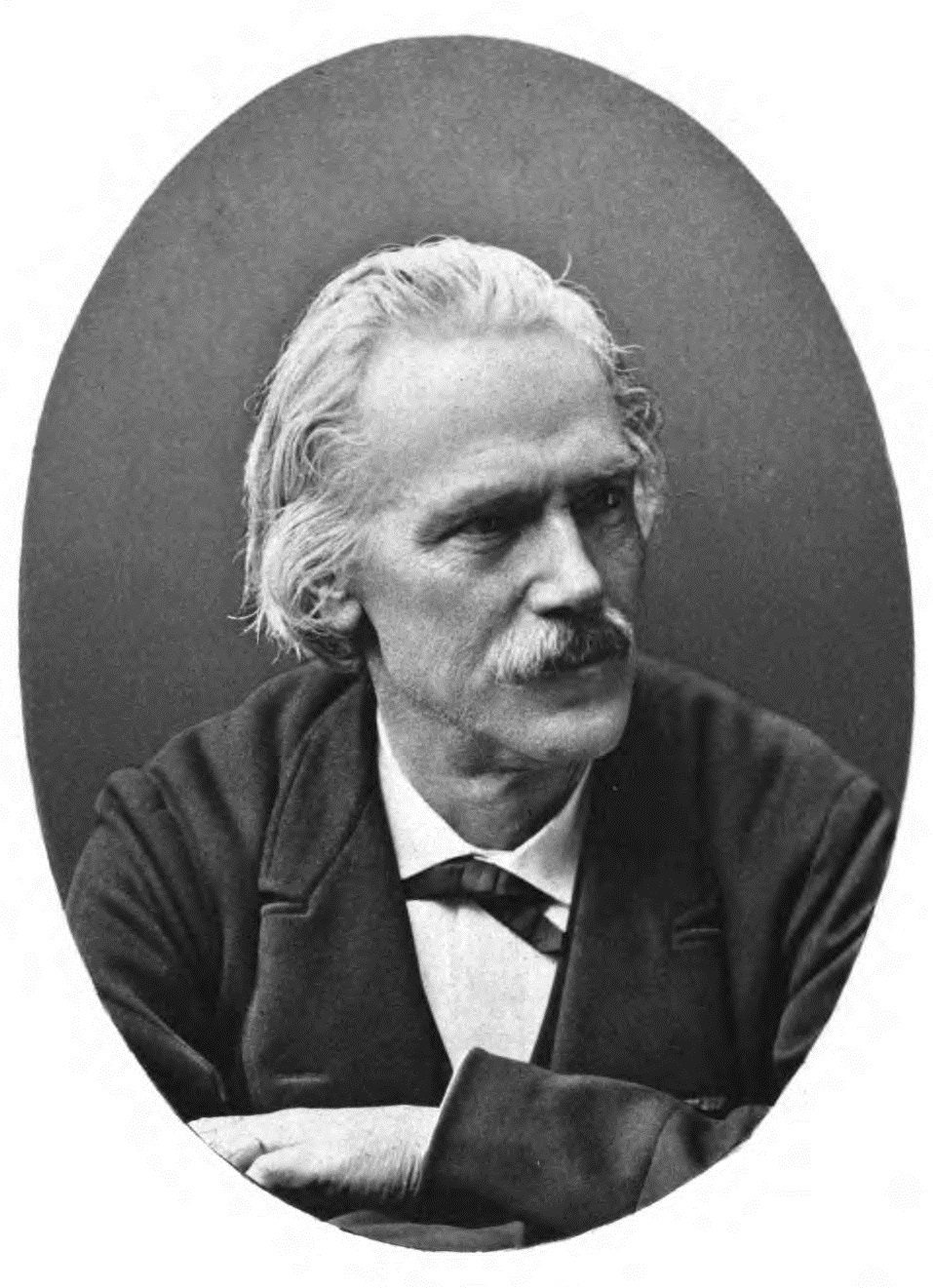
Picture of Joséphin Soulary, was a French poet.

== Works ==
Lyrical

- À travers champs (1838)
- Les Cinq cordes du luth (1838)
- Le Chemin de fer (1839)
- Les Ephémères (two series, 1846 and 1857)
- Sonnets humoristiques (1862)
- Les Figulines (1862)
- Les Diables bleus (1870)
- Pendant l'invasion (1871)
- La Chasse aux mouches d'or (1876)
- Les Rimes ironiques (1877)
- Jeux divins (1882)

Plays

- Un Grand homme qu'on attend (1879)
- Promenade autour d'un tiroir (1886)

His Œuvres poetiques were collected in three volumes (1872–1883). His Sonnets humoristiques attracted great attention, and charmed their readers by the mixture of gaiety and tragedy. His mastery over the technical difficulties of his art, especially in the sonnet, won him the title of the "Benvenuto of rhyme."
