= Lucien Chevaillier =

French composer, pianist, and music journalist

Lucien Chevaillier (sometimes spelled Chevallier) (21 August 1883 – 3 February 1932) was a French composer, pianist, and music journalist.

== Life ==
Chevaillier was born in Paris and studied at the Paris Conservatoire where he received first prizes in harmony, counterpoint and fugue. He taught for many years at the École normale de musique (Paris), the Strasbourg Conservatory, and was director of the École de musique at Belfort. He also wrote articles, reviews and conducted interviews for French music journals including "Le Guide du concert". He died in Paris.

He is best known for his music for piano, particularly his Berceuse, Op. 65. His one act opera Le Poème du soir premiered successfully at the Opéra-Comique in Paris on 13 May 1925.

== Bibliography ==
Key, Pierre V. (ed): "Chevaillier, Lucien" in Pierre Key's Musical Who's Who (New York: Pierre Key Inc., 1931), p. 120.
