= Léon-Paul Fargue =

French poet and essayist

- Born: 4 March 1876; Paris
- Died: 24 November 1947 (aged 71); Paris
- Occupation: Writer
- Writing career
- Genres: Poetry, essays

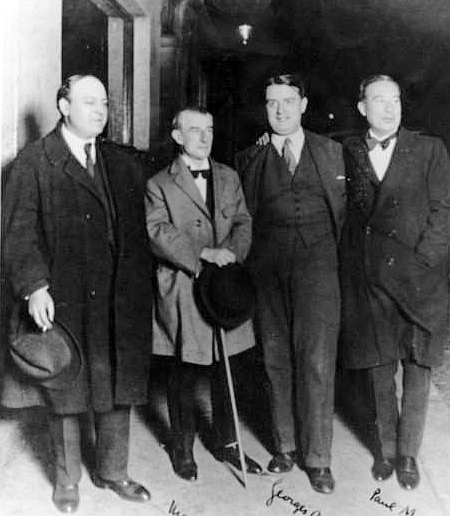
Fargue (left) with Maurice Ravel, Georges Auric and Paul Morand in 1927

Léon-Paul Fargue (French pronunciation: [leɔ̃ pɔl faʁɡ], 4 March 1876 – 24 November 1947) was a French poet and essayist.

He was born in Paris, France, on rue Coquilliére. As a poet he was noted for his poetry of atmosphere and detail. His work spanned numerous literary movements. Before he reached 19 years of age, Fargue had already published in L'Art littéraire in 1894 and his important poem Tancrède appeared in the magazine Pan in 1895.

As an opponent of the surrealists, he became a member of the Symbolist poetry circle connected with Le Mercure de France. Rilke, Joyce and others declared that Fargue was at the very forefront of modern poetry.

He was also a poet of Paris, and later in his career he published two books about the city, D'après Paris (1931) and Le piéton de Paris (1939). His earliest work is divided between Paris prowlings and intimate scenes of childhood and nature.

He was a great social lion in the literary scene of Paris in the 1920s and 30s. Walter Benjamin (who called Fargue "the greatest living poet in France") met him on a visit to the city in January 1930, and recounted an evening enlivened by charisma, wit, and incomparable storytelling. Fargue related to Benjamin the story of a dinner he held for Proust, his old friend, and James Joyce – the only time the two met.

"Fargue", wrote Leon-Pierre Quint in November 1929, "is one of those people who write as they speak; he constantly utters works that remain unwritten-perhaps from indolence, perhaps from contempt for writing. An endless sequence of unforced flashes of wit and puns-this was the only way he was capable of speaking. He has a childlike love of Paris, with its godforsaken little cafes, its bars, its streets, and its nightlife that never ends. He must be in robust health and have a highly resilient character. During the day he works as an industrialist, and at night he is always on the move. He is constantly seen with elegant women, Americans. He is close to fifty years of age, yet leads the life of a gigolo by night, hypnotizing everyone he meets with the charm of his speech."

Fargue published a book of recollections about his friend, the composer Ravel. He was a member of the Apaches and remained a lifelong friend of Ravel. One of his poems, Rêves, was set to music by Ravel in 1927.

He died in Paris in 1947 and is buried in the Cimetière du Montparnasse. Federico Mompou dedicated No. 12 of his Cançons i Danses to Fargue's memory.

== Selection of published works ==
- Poèmes, 1905
- Nocturnes, 1905
- Tancrède, 1911
- Pour la musique, 1912
- Ludions, 1923
- Banalité, 1928
- Vulturne, 1928
- Épaisseurs, 1929
- Sous la lampe, 1929
- D'après Paris, 1932
- Le Piéton de Paris, 1939. * The Stroller of Paris, tr. by Rainer J. Hanshe (Eris Press, 2025)
- High Solitude, tr. by Rainer J. Hanshe (Contra Mundum Press, 2024)
