= Dominical suite of songs =

Five-song suite by Paul Ladmirault

Dominical
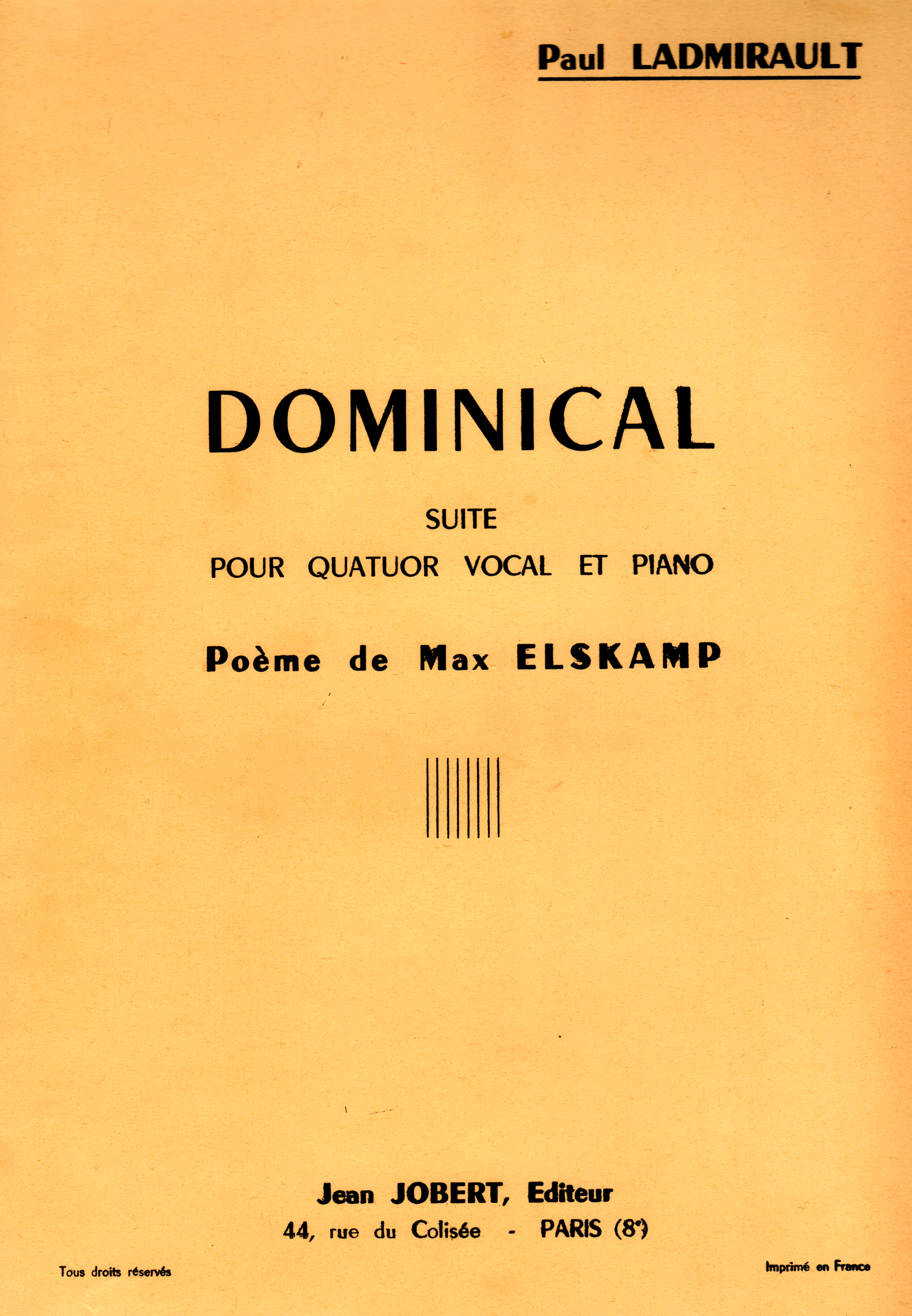
- Cover of the original edition.

Dominical is a suite of five songs by Paul Ladmirault for vocal quartet and piano, based on poems by Max Elskamp from the eponymous 1892 collection.

Composed in 1911 and influenced by Symbolism, the work combines elements of urban observation, childhood memory, and folkloric tradition. It premiered on 24 February 1912, performed by the Quartette vocal de Paris with pianist Marcel Chadeigne at the 388th concert of the Société nationale de musique, held at the Salle Pleyel.

Dominical, composed by Paul Ladmirault, was frequently performed in concerts during the 1920s and 1930s and was well-received by audiences and critics. After Ladmirault's death in 1944, the work gradually became less known.

Dominical, a song cycle by Paul Ladmirault, is less known than his solo piano work Mémoires d’un âne but exemplifies his compositional style. It is among his earliest major works and was the first of his song cycles to be recorded.

== Composition ==
Paul Ladmirault composed Dominical, a set of five songs for a vocal quartet and piano, in 1911. A student at the Conservatoire de Paris under André Gedalge and Gabriel Fauré, he studied alongside composers such as Maurice Ravel, Florent Schmitt, Jean Roger-Ducasse, Louis Aubert, and Georges Enesco. He was regarded as a highly talented musician of his generation.

His early concert performances received encouragement from Claude Debussy:

Mr. Ladmirault, whose dreamy and subtle musicality, as if somewhat fearful of expressing itself too openly, bears witness to a true artistic nature. Mr. Ladmirault should beware, for dreamers are not well regarded in our time, where people are in such a hurry to arrive that they’ve invented automobiles.

— Gil Blas, March 9, 1903

Originally titled Suites dominicales, Paul Ladmirault's Dominical was published in Antwerp by Max Elskamp in 1892 and later included in the 1898 French collection La Louange de la vie, which compiled earlier artisanal publications. While Ladmirault was setting these Symbolist poems to music, his contemporary Florent Schmitt, a noted music critic, described him in La France as a highly gifted, original, and modest composer among his generation's leading figures.

== Reception ==
The Dominical suite premiered on 24 February 1912 at the Salle Pleyel in Paris, performed by the Quartette vocal de Paris, an ensemble formed in 1911 around Marcel Chadeigne, during a concert organized by the Société nationale de musique. Music critic Louis Vuillemin described the work as luminous, emotional, and picturesque, noting its appeal to knowledgeable audiences.

On 11 February 1913, two songs from Dominical were performed again by the Quartette vocal de Paris, noted as either better known or revised by Paul Ladmirault, and were praised for their melodic quality. The work was later performed in Porto in 1921 by the Bataille Quartet.

Dominical was published posthumously by Éditions Jean Jobert in 1951, seven years after Paul Ladmirault's death.

== Presentation ==
=== Poems ===
The polyphony in Dominical exemplifies early 20th-century French music. Paul Ladmirault, influenced by Renaissance polyphonists like Clément Janequin, Claudin de Sermisy, and Claude Le Jeune, incorporated stylistic elements from various historical periods, as did contemporaries such as Claude Debussy.

Paul Ladmirault selected four poems and the seventh from the De Joie section of Max Elskamp's 1892 collection for his song cycle Dominical, retaining the original title. Viewing the songs as intimate expressions, Ladmirault emphasized the melancholic and introspective tone in Elskamp's poetry, rather than portraying him solely as a naive depictor of Flemish life. His musical setting captures the anticipation and subtle disappointment of provincial Sunday life, characterized by quiet sadness.

Ils sont venus, ils sont venus, naïvement nus et goulus de raisins de verre et de cierges, sur les bras longs des saintes-vierges, les dimanches ; sonnez matines, Frère Jacques en mes doctrines. Or c'en est fini des semaines où dans l'eau, mains rouges, l'on peine ; il fait chaude joie dans le cœur et les arbres chantent en chœur...	They have come, they have come, naively naked and greedy for glass grapes and candles, on the long arms of the holy virgins, the Sundays; ring the matins, Brother Jacques in my doctrines Now the weeks are over where, in water, red hands toil; there is warm joy in the heart and the trees sing in chorus...

The second song of Dominical maintains a melancholic tone, depicting morning streets with closed shops, where groups of strollers, possibly inebriated, sing and call out to those in quiet homes. The poetry blends urban life and folklore, reflecting modern influences:

Et la ville de mes mille âmes dormez-vous, dormez-vous ; il fait dimanche, mes femmes et ma ville dormez-vous ?	And the city of my thousand souls are you sleeping, are you sleeping; it is Sunday, my women and my city, are you sleeping?

The third movement depicts a domestic scene featuring elderly individuals who remain by the hearth with young children, while others have gone either to church or to the tavern:

Et s'ébrouant, rouets rouant, les rouets au matin des vieilles leur font s'éjouir les oreilles, d'un bruit rouant et s'ébrouant.	And shaking themselves, spinning wheels whirring, the spinning wheels in the old women's morning make their ears rejoice, with a whirring sound and a shaking.

The fourth song of Dominical is a mystical and naive reverie, evoking the style of primitive paintings with religious figures like the Virgin and Mary Magdalene in ornate garments. It portrays Paradise as envisioned by a humble soul, resembling distant, grand residences seen through a wall, set amid serene landscapes with expansive lawns, tall trees, and large ponds. The poetry links contemplation of the external world to introspection and a longing for the absolute, reflecting central themes in Max Elskamp's work:

Dans un beau château, seigneur auprès de sa dame, mon cœur cause avec mon âme en échangeant des anneaux, dans un beau château.	In a beautiful castle, lord beside his lady, my heart converses with my soul exchanging rings, in a beautiful castle.

The final song of Dominical portrays twilight with a sense of peace and melancholic disenchantment, characterized by an atmosphere of fading and quiet resignation. It concludes with the chorus's subdued murmur and the soprano's somber final phrase, reflecting sadness and disillusionment:

Or, passent ainsi les dimanches.	And so the Sundays pass.

Vladimir Jankélévitch analyzes the depiction of Sunday in late 19th- and early 20th-century Symbolist literature, including Maurice Maeterlinck's Hothouses, Georges Rodenbach's Bruges-la-Morte, Claude Debussy's Proses lyriques, and Gabriel Dupont's Heures dolentes. In these works, Sunday is portrayed as a day of festivity and leisure but also as one marked by spleen and boredom, characterized by a state of "morose delectation." This ambivalence is expressed through a languor that blends decline with bittersweet emotional nuances.

=== Movements ===
Dominical, a musical work comprising five polyphonic songs, is noted for the rich and elaborate quality of its inspiration:

1. "They have come!" — Animato assai e giocoso ( = 132) in F-sharp major at 2/4;
1. "And the city of my thousand souls?" — Allegro moderato e risoluto ( = 144) at 2/4;
1. "And shaking themselves…" — Allegro leggiero ( = 126) at 6/8;
1. "In a beautiful castle" — Moderate, without slowness ( = 88) in four-four time;
1. "And a veil rocked like no other" — Largo molto ( = 108) in F-sharp minor at 9/4.

=== Forces ===
The musical score of Dominical is written for a vocal quartet consisting of four solo voices—soprano, alto, tenor, and bass—rather than a four-part choir. The piano serves as an accompaniment, occasionally taking a solo role in certain passages, beyond providing harmonic support for the vocal parts.

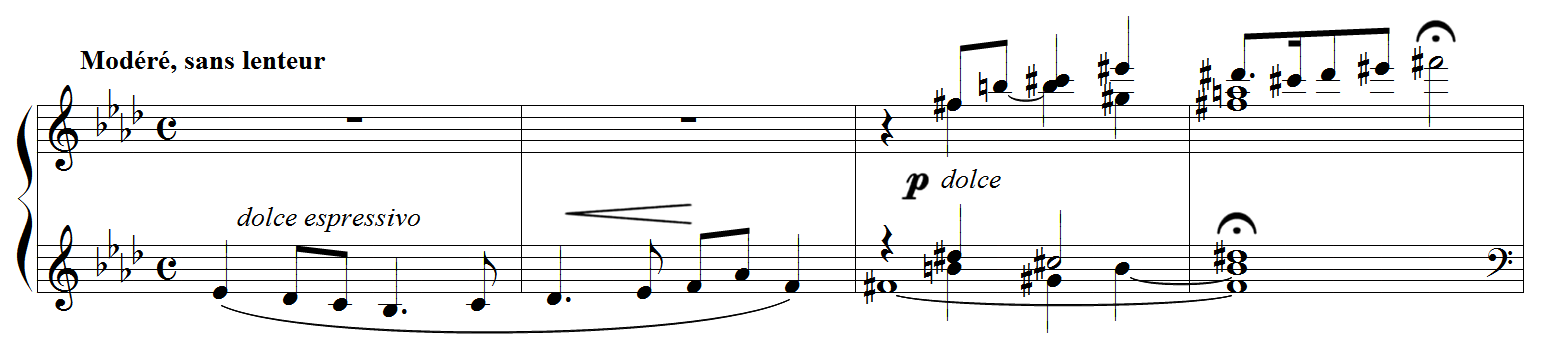
Paul Ladmirault – Dominical (4th movement, first bars) Listen to: Paul Ladmirault - Dominical, 4th movement (bars 1-15): Performed by Gailletboréal in 2018.

== Analysis ==
Musicologist Guy Sacre describes Paul Ladmirault's music as reflecting a naïve and joyful personality, uninfluenced by the negative aspects of the 20th century. The first song of Dominical opens with an exuberant expression of joy, celebrating the eagerly anticipated day.

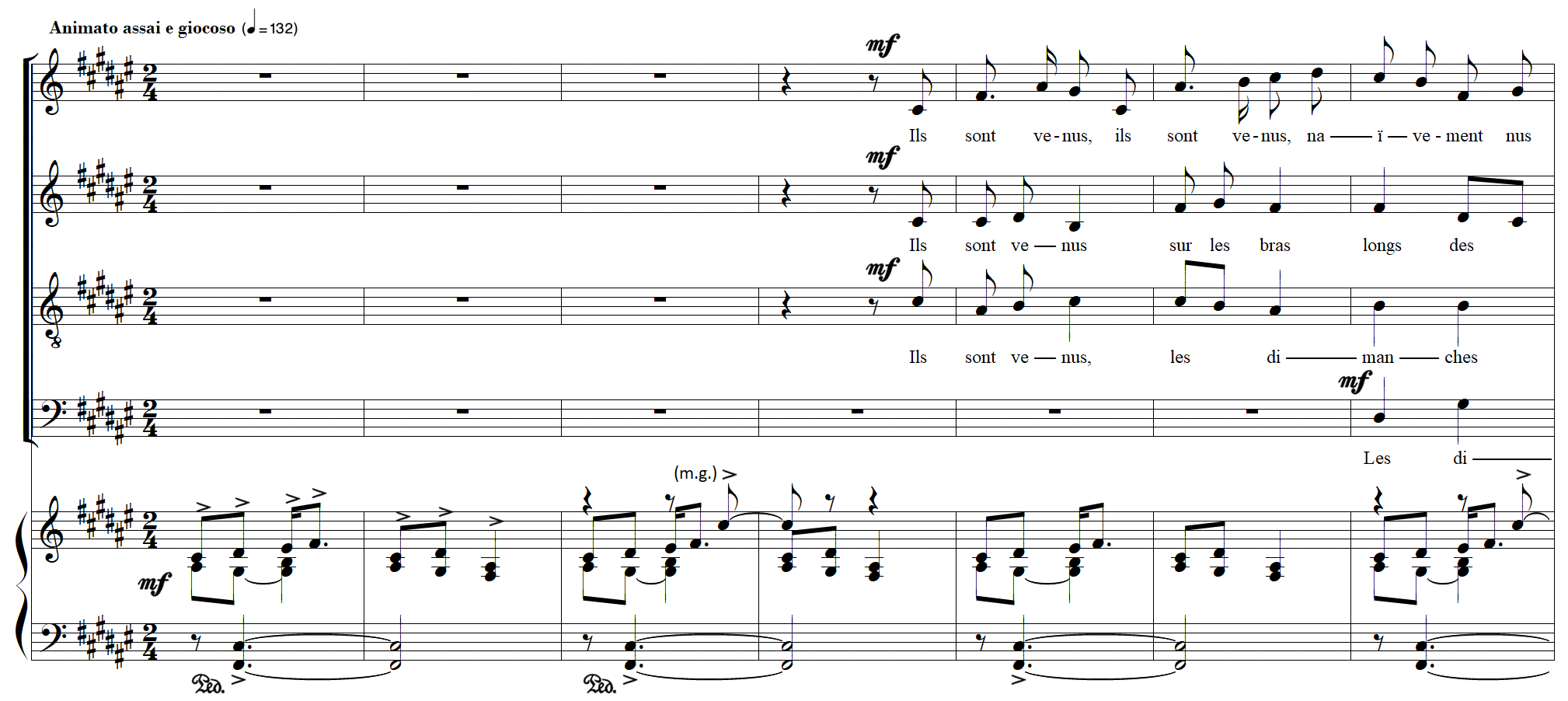
Paul Ladmirault – Dominical (1st movement, first bars) Listen to: Paul Ladmirault - Dominical, 1st movement (bars 1-5) Performed by Gailletboréal in 2018.

Paul Ladmirault's vocal writing in Dominical employs dense counterpoint, setting each poem in its entirety without omissions. The contrapuntal style mirrors the four-voice polyphony of 15th- and 16th-century Renaissance madrigals or motets. However, text repetition across voices can obscure the structure of each poem.

At the premiere of Paul Ladmirault's Dominical, music critic Louis Vuillemin observed that the first vocal quartet was overly complex, posing challenges for performance and comprehension. The subsequent quartets, however, were clearer while maintaining a high level of craftsmanship in both concept and execution.

Paul Ladmirault's score for Dominical does not prioritize a direct understanding of Max Elskamp's poems, unlike monodic vocal forms such as melodies or chansons. Instead, it creates an atmospheric framework that reflects the Belgian poet's world, incorporating selective figurative elements. Ladmirault uses madrigalisms and sound imagery to emphasize specific words or ideas in the text. For instance, in Fileuse, the piano mimics the sound of a spinning wheel, complemented by the quartet's fluid vocal lines:

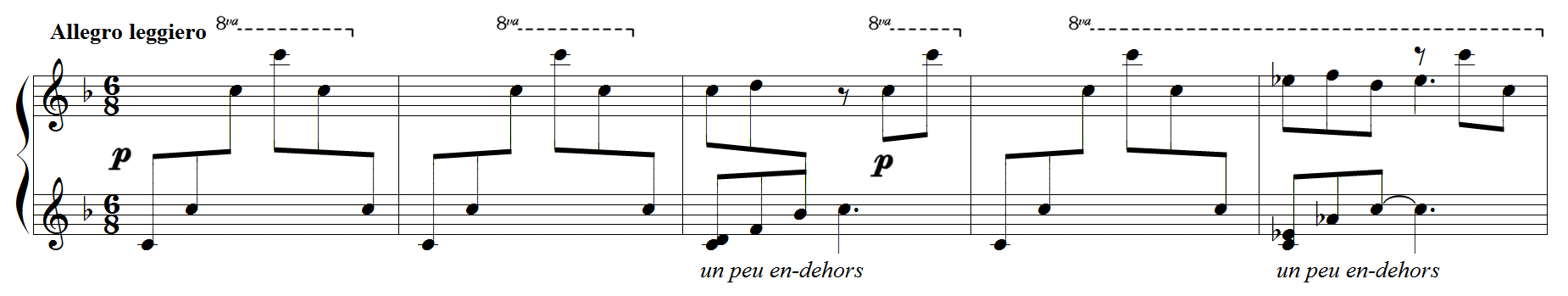
Paul Ladmirault – Dominical (3rd movement, first measures) Listen to: Paul Ladmirault - Dominical, 3rd movement (bars 1-22) Performed by Gailletboréal in 2018.

Paul Ladmirault's Dominical complements Max Elskamp's Symbolist poetry, reflecting the lives of Flemish or Breton people through shared emotional themes. The composition prioritizes a harmonic soundscape over the precise meaning of the text. The vocal quartet employs intricate counterpoint, highlighting the syllabic and assonant qualities of the poetry, while the piano uses a rich tonal palette and nuanced, shifting harmonies to create atmosphere and evoke imagery.

== Legacy ==
=== Concerts ===
On 23 April 1921, Paul Ladmirault's Dominical was performed by the Bataille Quartet at the Société nationale de musique, receiving enthusiastic applause, with the second song notably encored. Critics and audiences appreciated its delicately archaic charm. A review in La Liberté described the songs as enchanting when well-rehearsed and subtly performed, while critic Louis Vuillemin lamented the work's infrequent performances due to the scarcity of established vocal quartets.

In 1929, Dominical was successfully performed in Nantes. A review in L'Ouest-Éclair characterized the score as a series of poetic tableaux with original and emotive sensitivity, noting that the main thematic line could be obscured by interwoven motifs but praising the ingenious combination of themes.

In 1935, the fourth song of Dominical was featured at a "Festival Paul Ladmirault." Music critic Florent Schmitt, writing in Le Temps, remarked that Ladmirault, despite his talent, remained underrecognized. In 1939, Schmitt further noted that Ladmirault's poetic vocal quartets were among the most distinguished moments in Société Nationale de Musique concerts.

=== Criticism ===
In 1913, music critic Louis Vuillemin described Dominical as one of Ladmirault’s significant works, praising him as a highly skilled and talented musician. Writing in Comœdia, Vuillemin, identified by Émile Vuillermoz as a Breton and native Breton speaker, compared the cycle of melodies to the compositions of Paul Le Flem:

These types of music are not opposed. A single instinct gave birth to them. An equal melancholy veils them even in joy. A kind of rhythmic specialty is perceptible in both. Breton in spirit, they are closer than mere Breton fashion.

Later on, Le Flem created an orchestral version of the score, and Vuillermoz praised these works "where an extremely personal temperament is asserted, a penetrating poetic sense, and a prodigious richness of harmonic invention."

In 1930, René Dumesnil characterized Dominical as a five-part suite for vocal quartet and piano, noting its stylistic similarities to the work of Gabriel Fauré, Ladmirault's teacher. In 1960, Paul Pittion described the vocal works as vividly crafted. Dominical, similar to other compositions by Ladmirault, reflects harmonic influences from Fauré and Claude Debussy, often combined with folk elements, showcasing a distinctly French musical temperament.

While Dominical is not included in the Dictionnaire des œuvres de la musique vocale (Bordas, 1992) (Note: Dictionnaire, organized by work titles, goes from Desmarest's Domine ne in furore to Auber's Domino noir.) or the Guide de la mélodie et du lied (Fayard, 1994), (Note: Guide, organized by author names, goes from Kreutzer to Lajtha.) the Dictionnaire des compositeurs de musique en Bretagne (1992) praises the vocal quartet for its exquisite writing and distinctive character.

Paul Ladmirault's piano suite Mémoires d’un âne, considered among the finest of its genre, remained largely unknown and difficult to access for many years, a situation musicologist Guy Sacre described as inexplicable. In 1998, Sacre sought to revive interest in these impressionistic scores, which evoke landscapes of moors and shorelines, capturing an ardent yet melancholic spirit. Ladmirault did not actively seek fame, and his work has remained known to a small but dedicated audience, who appreciate its distinctive melodies and rhythms.

== Discography ==
- Ladmirault, Paul (1986). Dominical, Messe brève, Prière à Notre-Dame [Sunday, Short Mass, Prayer to Our Lady] (in French). François Villon.

== See also ==
- Paul Ladmirault
- Symbolism (movement)

== Bibliography ==
=== Score ===
- Ladmirault, Paul; Elskamp, Max (1951). Dominical : suite pour quatuor vocal et piano [Dominical: suite for vocal quartet and piano] (in French). Paris: Éditions Jobert.

=== General works ===
- Cafafa, Marielle (2017). La chanson polyphonique française au temps de Debussy, Ravel et Poulenc [French polyphonic song in the time of Debussy, Ravel, and Poulenc]. Univers musical (in French). Paris: L'Harmattan. ISBN 978-2-3431-3603-5.
- Debussy, Claude (1987). Monsieur Croche, antidilettante [Mr. Croche, anti-dilettante]. L'Imaginaire (in French). Paris: Gallimard. ISBN 2-07-071107-2.
- Duchesneau, Michel (1997). L'Avant-garde musicale et ses sociétés à Paris de 1871 à 1939 [The Musical Avant-Garde and Its Societies in Paris from 1871 to 1939] (in French). Paris: Éditions Mardaga. ISBN 2-87009-634-8.
- Dumesnil, René (1930). La musique contemporaine en France [Contemporary music in France] (in French). Vol. I. Paris: Armand Colin. OCLC 463860084.
- Elskamp, Max (1892). Dominical (in French). Lacomblez: Anvers & Bruxelles.
- Elskamp, Max; Gorceix, Paul (1997). La Chanson de la rue Saint-Paul [The Song of Saint Paul Street]. Poésie (in French). Paris: Gallimard. ISBN 2-0703-2970-4.
- François-Sappey, Brigitte; Cantagrel, Gilles (1994). Guide de la mélodie et du lied [Guide to Melody and Lied]. Les Indispensables de la musique (in French). Paris: Fayard. ISBN 2-213-59210-1.
- Jankélévitch, Vladimir (1974). L'irréversible et la nostalgie [The irreversible and nostalgia]. Champ philosophique (in French). Paris: Flammarion. ISSN 0768-1011.
- Lenoir, Théodore; de Bellaing, Vefa (1992). Dictionnaire des compositeurs de musique en Bretagne [Dictionary of composers in Brittany] (in French). Nantes: Ouest Éditions. pp. 137–143. ISBN 978-2-9082-6111-0.
- Pittion, Paul (1960). La musique et son histoire : de Beethoven à nos jours [Music and its history: from Beethoven to the present day] (in French). Vol. II. Paris: Éditions Ouvrières.
- Robert, Frédéric; Honegger, Marc; Prévost, Paul (1992). Dictionnaire des œuvres de la musique vocale [Dictionary of vocal music works] (in French). Vol. 1. Paris: Bordas. ISBN 2-04-015395-0.
- Sacre, Guy (1998). La musique pour piano : dictionnaire des compositeurs et des œuvres [Piano Music: Dictionary of Composers and Works]. Bouquins (in French). Vol. II. Paris: Robert Laffont. pp. 1599–1603. ISBN 978-2-221-08566-0.
- Samazeuilh, Gustave (1947). Musiciens de mon temps : Chroniques et souvenirs [Musicians of my time: Chronicles and memories] (in French). Paris: Éditions Marcel Daubin.
- Vuillermoz, Émile (1979). Histoire de la musique [History of music]. Les grandes études historiques (in French). Paris: Fayard. ISBN 2-213-00859-0.

=== Monographs ===
- Lorent, Catherine (2012). Florent Schmitt. Horizons (in French). Paris: Bleu nuit éditeur. ISBN 978-2-35884-016-3.

=== Articles ===
- Dezarnaux, Robert (1921). "La musique" [Music]. La Liberté (in French).
- Guilloux, Paul (1929). "Chronique musicale : Quatuor de Debussy, Dominical de Ladmirault, Quatuor de Ravel" [Music review: Quatuorde Debussy, Dominical by Ladmirault, Quatuorde Ravel]. L'Ouest-Éclair (in French).
- Linor, Georges (1921). "La semaine musicale" [Music week]. L'Homme libre (in French).
- L.M. (1911). "Le Quartette vocal de Paris" [The Paris Vocal Quartet]. Société internationale de musique (in French). Paris: Librairie Ch. Delagrave. ISSN 1763-7309.
- Miller, Catherine (2005). "Dominical, Suite pour quatuor vocal et piano : Une lecture d'Elskamp par Paul Ladmirault" [Dominical, Suite for vocal quartet and piano: A reading by Paul Ladmirault]. Textyles 26–27 (in French): 66–71.
- Simon, René (February 17, 1913). "Concerts et récitals : Mardi 11 février" [Concerts and recitals: Tuesday, February 11]. Gil Blas (in French).
- Schmitt, Florent (May 4, 1935). "Les Concerts" [Concerts]. Le Temps (in French).
- Schmitt, Florent (April 15, 1939). "Les Concerts" [Concerts]. Le Temps (in French).
- Schneider, Louis (March 11, 1913). "Concerts Lamoureux et Colonne, séances diverses" [Lamoureux and Colonne concerts, various performances]. Le Gaulois (in French).
- Vuillemin, Louis (February 26, 1912). "La semaine musicale" [Music week]. Comœdia (in French).
- Vuillemin, Louis (February 6, 1913a). "La semaine musicale" [Music week]. Comœdia (in French).
- Vuillemin, Louis (April 10, 1913b). "La semaine musicale" [Music week]. Comœdia (in French).
- Vuillemin, Louis (April 26, 1921). "La semaine musicale" [Music week]. La Lanterne (in French).

=== Discography ===
- Deletang, Xavier (2002). "Paul Ladmirault et son œuvre" [Paul Ladmirault and his work]. Skarbo (SK 4001) (in French and English). Paris: 2–5.
- Lenoir, Théodore (1986). "Dominical, Messe brève, Prière à Notre-Dame" [Sunday, Short Mass, Prayer to Our Lady]. Auvidis (AV 4836) (in French, Breton, English, and German). Paris: 2–3.
- Surrans, Alain (2008). "Les œuvres pour chœur de Paul Ladmirault" [Paul Ladmirault's works for choir]. Skarbo (DSK 2084) (in French and English). Paris: 2–4.
