= Baltus =

Baltus may refer to:

== First name ==
- Baltus Mantz (1815-1854), American politician

== Middle name ==
- Basile Baltus de Pouilly (1766-1845), French generals

== Surname ==
- Ado Baltus (1918-1990), Belgian architect and painter
- Barry Baltus (born 2004), Belgian Grand Prix motorcycle racer
- Georges Baltus (1874-1967), Belgian painter
- Gerd Baltus (1932-2019), German television actor
- Jean-François Baltus (1667-1743), French Jesuit Theologian
- Jeffrey Baltus (born 1991), footballer
- Martin Baltus (born 1953), Dutch rower
- Pietje Baltus (1830-1914), Dutch peasant

== Species ==
- Polyptychus baltus, a moth of the family Sphingidae
