= Alain Bernaud =

French composer (1932–2020)

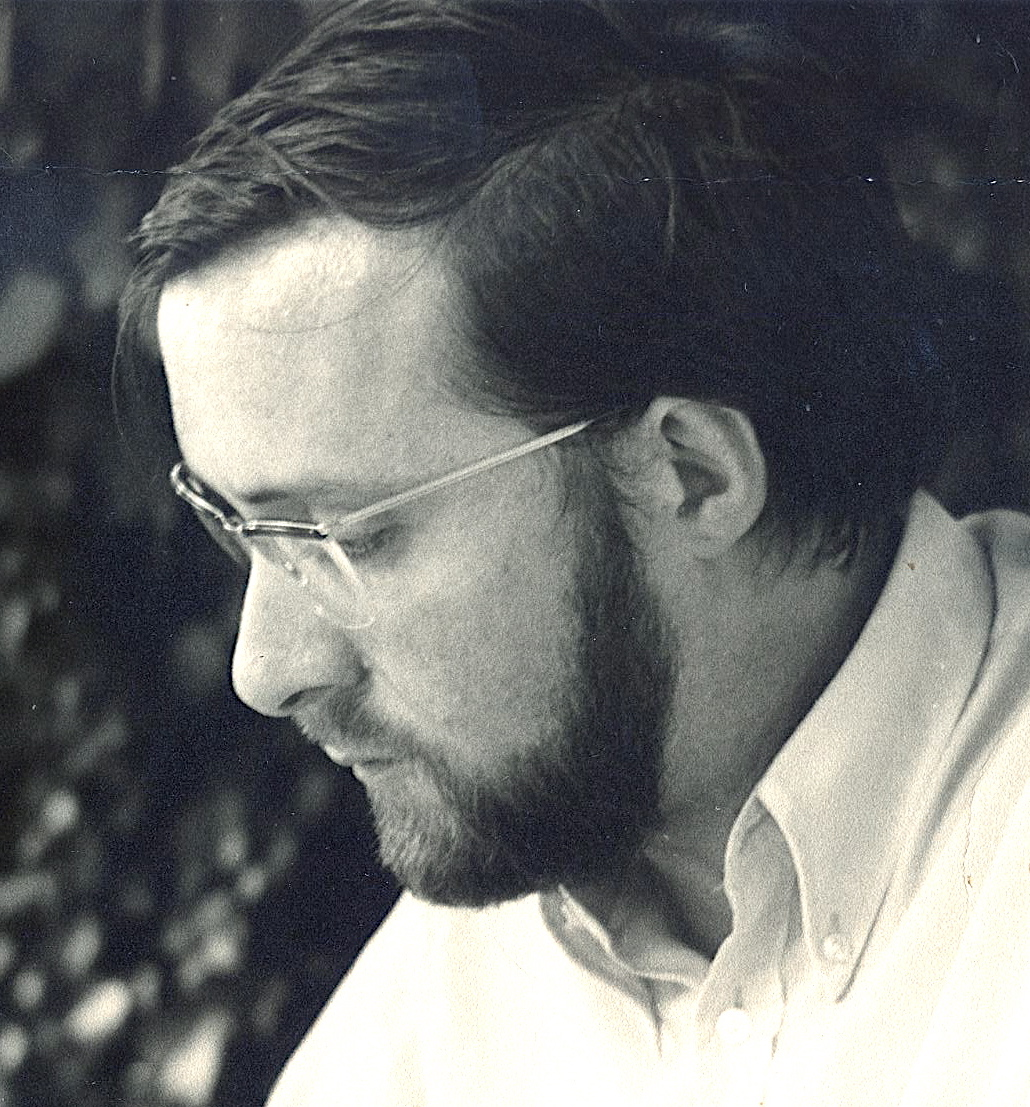
- Alain Bernaud in 1959
- Born: Alain Henri Bernaud; 8 March 1932; Neuilly-sur-Seine, Hauts‑de‑Seine, France
- Died: 4 December 2020 (aged 88); Paimpol (or Brittany region), France
- Occupations: Composer, music educator
- Organizations: Conservatoire de Paris (professor of solfège for instrumentalists from 1963; professor of harmony from 1971)
- Known for: Chamber works; orchestral compositions; film & TV scores
- Awards: 2nd Prix de Rome for composition (1955); 1st Grand Prix de Rome for composition (1957)
- Website: abernaud.free.fr/Alain_Bernaud/

Alain Henri Bernaud (8 March 1932 – 4 December 2020) was a French composer.

== Life ==
Bernaud was born in Neuilly-sur-Seine of a polytechnician father, a good violinist and violist and a mother playing the piano, daughter of Marcel Chadeigne who was, before and after the First World War, choir conductor at the Paris Opera and pianist - accompanist - decipherer - reducer of orchestral scores.

He had formed with Maurice Ravel, Maurice Delage, Déodat de Séverac, Florent Schmitt, Paul Ladmirault, Émile Vuillermoz, Désiré Inghelbrecht, Ricardo Viñes and Tristan Klingsor, a group they had named Les Apaches, and whose rallying call was whistling the first theme of Borodin's Second Symphony.

Arriving in Paris in 1938, he began studying piano and music theory with Marie-Louise Gigout-Boëllmann, wrote his Opus 1, a string quartet (for the family!) and then returned to the Conservatoire de Paris (direction of Claude Delvincourt) in specialized solfege class, at Lucette Descaves, where he met Michel Legrand, Roger Boutry, Jean-Michel Defaye and Alain Weber.

He then followed Jules Gentil's piano class (1st medal) - studied harmony with Jacques de La Presle (1st prize) - counterpoint and fugue with Noël Gallon (1st medal and 1st prize) - finally musical composition with Tony Aubin (1st Prix de Rome in 1953 with Ouverture à la française for 2 pianos). He won the 2nd Prix de Rome in 1955 with the cantata Le Rire de Gargantua then 1st Grand Prix de Rome in 1957 with the cantata La fée Urgèle. Bernaud stayed 40 months at the Villa Médicis, a stay during which he wrote a quartet for saxophones, Les chants de la jungle - six melodies for baritone and string orchestra on poems from Rudyard Kipling, a Symphony, an Ouverture pour orchestre de chambre (1960), a Messe brève for mixed choir and organ (1958), a Nocturne pour orchestre à cordes, Sept mélodies pour flûte et mezzo soprano on poems by Omar Khayyam.

Back in France, he wrote scores for television shows Présence du passé, for short films and also feature films and was appointed, in 1963, professor of solfege for instrumentalists at the Conservatoire de Paris, and a little later, in 1971, harmony teacher in the same establishment. He provided this teaching there until the end of 1999.

== Compositions ==
=== 1950s ===
- 1951: Sonate pour violon et piano
- 1953: Ouverture à la française for 2 pianos
- 1955: Concerto lyrique for clarinet and orchestra (Ed. Alphonse Leduc)
- 1957: Récitatif et air for clarinet and piano (Ed. Leduc)
- 1958: Capriccio rustique for oboe and piano (Ed. Leduc)
- 1959: Suite en trois mouvements: Ouverture, Sarabande & Gigue pour grand orchestre
- 1959: Chants de la Jungle, after Kipling for baritone and string orchestra (Ed. Combre)

=== 1960s ===
- 1963: Pavane et saltarelle for trumpet and piano (Ed. Ricordi)
- 1964: Humoresque for tuba (or Bb saxhorn or cello) and piano (Ed. Max Eschig)
- 1965: Diptyque for oboe and piano (Ed. Leduc)
- 1965: Cadence pour le concerto de piano K491 de Mozart (Ed. Musimage)
- 1966: D’une extrême gravité, 2 pieces for double bass and piano (Ed. Leduc)
- 1967:Trois pièces pour les percussions (Ed. Rideau Rouge)
- 1968: Contrastes for viola and piano (Ed. Rideau Rouge)
- 1969: Réversibilité for violin and piano (concours J. Thibaud 1969 - Édition Rideau Rouge)

=== 1970s ===
- 1970: Phantasmes for clarinet and piano (Ed. Rideau Rouge)
- 1970: “ Romance” for clarinet and piano (Ed. Riedau Rouge)
- 1972: Obliques for cello and piano (Ed. Rideau Rouge)
- 1973: Incantation et danse for flute and piano (Ed. Rideau Rouge)
- 1973: Magyar for violin and piano (concours Jacques Thibaud 1973 - Ed. Rideau Rouge)
- 1974: Sonate pour les deux saxophones, soprano and bariton (Ed. Combre)
- 1975: Scherzo pour cor et piano (Ed. Max Eschig)
- 1975: Le jardin de Gabriel Six evocations for violin and piano
- 1976: Hommage au capitaine Fracasse for percussion and piano (Ed. Rideau Rouge)
- 1977: Final pour saxophone alto et piano (Ed. Choudens)
- 1978: Hallucinations for bassoon and piano (Ed. Peermusic - E.M.I. 1978)
- 1979: Crescendo, progressive pieces for young pianists (Ed. Kercoz)
- 1979: Étude-expression for quintet with clarinet (1979)

=== 1980s ===
- 1980: Exponentielles for tenor trombone and piano (Ed. E.M.I.)
- 1981: Variations pour hautbois et piano (Ed. Billaudot)
- 1984: Rhapsodie pour saxophone alto et piano (Ed. Choudens)
- 1986: Dies irae Deus misericordiæ for Large Organ (Ed.Kercoz)

=== 1990–2010 ===
- 1990: Le Miroir d’Euterpe 49 preludes for string quartet (Ed.Kercoz)
- 1997: Catalyses, Rhapsody for piano (Ed. Kercoz) musical journey for an exhibition of the painter François Bernaud
- 2000: Cinq pièces pour quatuor de violoncelles, in honour of Howard Buten (Ed.Kercoz)
- 2004: Variazioni Napoli for baroque harpsichord (Ed.Kercoz)
- 2005: Quatre mouvements pour trois archets et douze cordes for string trio (Ed. Kercoz)
- 2005: Partita pour violoncelle solo (Ed. Kercoz)
- 2008: La flûte Greco Romaine, Seven pieces of progressive difficulty for flute and piano
- 2009: Cinq pièces faciles pour guitare
- 2009: Partita pour violoncelle solo (Ed.Combre)
- 2009: Cinque intermezzi per piano solo
- 2009: 33 Basses données pour l'étude du contrepoint fugué

=== 2010–2013 ===
- 2010: Suite archaïque for oboe, bassoon and string trio
- 2010: Figures de style ou le Clavier bien partagé 50 pieces for four hands piano
- 2013: FAGKONZERT for bassoon and string orchestra

=== For cinema ===
- 1961: Le Trésor des 13 maisons, TV serials, 13 épisodes
- 1962: De la Perse à l'Iran, documentary
- 1963: Rien ne va plus, by Jean Bacqué
- 1964: Suzanne et le cambrioleur - short film
- 1965: Yalta ou le partage du monde, documentary
- 1967: Valmy - TV film
- 1967: Francis au pays des grands fauves (with Antoine Duhamel), TV serials, 55 épisodes
- 1968: L'Homme de l'ombre, TV serials, 6 épisodes
- 1968: Nadar, documentary
- 1968: Les Sœurs Barenton, short film
- 1971: L'homme de désir, by Dominique Delouche
- 1979: Petite histoire un peu triste
- 1989: La Grande Cabriole, by Nina Companéez

== Awards ==
- 2nd Prix de Rome for composition 1955.
- 1st Grand Prix de Rome for composition 1957.
