= John Glanvill =

John Glanvill (1664?–1735) was an English barrister, known as a poet and translator.

== Life ==
Born at Broad Hinton, Wiltshire, about 1664, he was the son of Julius Glanvil of Lincoln's Inn, by his wife, Anne Bagnall of St. Dunstan-in-the-West, London; Sir John Glanville was his grandfather. He became a commoner of Trinity College, Oxford, in 1678, was elected scholar 10 June 1680, and graduate B.A. 24 October 1682, M.A. 24 November 1685.

In 1683 Glanvill stood for a fellowship at All Souls College, Oxford, but Thomas Creech was elected. Glanvill was affronted, and, according to Thomas Hearne, was expelled by his college. He entered Lincoln's Inn, and was called to the bar.

Glanvill died a wealthy bachelor on 12 June 1735, aged 71, at Catchfrench, in St. Germans, Cornwall, an estate he had purchased in 1726.

== Works ==
Glanvill was the author of:

- Some Odes of Horace imitated with Relation to His Majesty and the Times, London, 1690.
- Poem … lamenting the Death of her late Sacred Majesty of the Small-pox, London, 1695.
- A Panegyrick to the King [in verse], London [1697].
- The Happy Pair, a new song [anon.], London [1706?]; other editions 1710? 1750?.
- Poems, consisting of originals and translations, London, 1725.
- Two Letters to Francis Gregor, dated Catchfrench, August 1730 and October 1730, printed in Francis Gregor's preface to Sir John Fortescue's De Laudibus legum Angliæ, 1737, pp. xxvii–xxxii.

He also translated from the Latin Seneca's Agamemnon, act i., which, with A Song, was in Miscellany Poems and Translations by Oxford Hands, London, 1685. In the Annual Miscellany for 1694, pt. iv. of Miscellany Poems, London, 1694, he had translations from Seneca and Horace. He also translated Fontenelle's A Plurality of Worlds, London, 1688; other editions, London, 1695; London, 1702. Some his poems were reprinted in vol. iv. of John Nichols's Collection.

== Notes ==
Attribution

This article incorporates text from a publication now in the public domain: Stephen, Leslie, ed. (1890). "Glanvill, John". Dictionary of National Biography. Vol. 21. London: Smith, Elder & Co.
