= Conversations on the Plurality of Worlds =

1686 book by Bernard le Bovier de Fontenelle

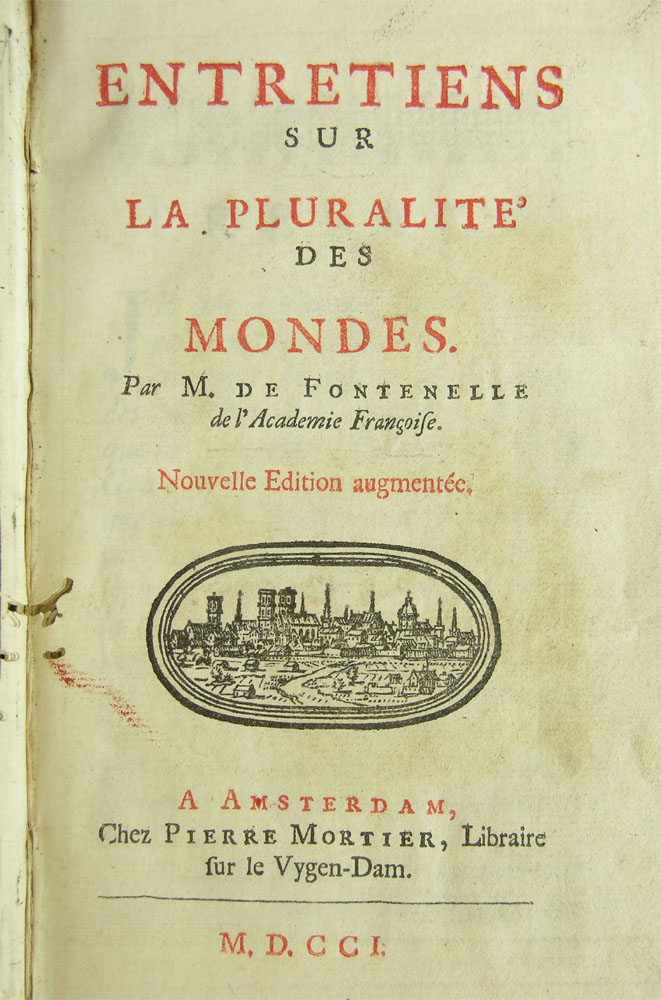
- Front page of 1701 edition
- Author: Bernard Le Bovier de Fontenelle
- Original title: Entretiens sur la pluralité des mondes
- Language: French
- Subject: Astronomy, popular science, philosophy
- Genre: Dialogue
- Published: 1686
- Publisher: Vve C. Blageart
- Publication place: France

Conversations on the Plurality of Worlds (French: Entretiens sur la pluralité des mondes) is a work of astronomical and philosophical popular science in the form of a dialogue, published anonymously in 1686 and attributed to Bernard Le Bovier de Fontenelle. The text presents the astronomical theories of René Descartes and Nicolaus Copernicus through conversations between a narrator and a marquise, divided into six evenings and preceded by a preface and a dedication To Monsieur L***.

The book was intended for educated non-specialist readers, especially from aristocratic and fashionable society. Fontenelle's choice of French rather than scientific Latin helped the work reach a non-specialist audience: Conversations went through many new editions—33 during the author's lifetime—and was translated into more than ten languages.

== Publication history ==
=== Composition and publication ===
The work was published anonymously in 1686. The first edition contained five "evenings"; a sixth was added in the 1687 edition. During Fontenelle's lifetime, 33 editions of the text appeared.

=== Scientific and cultural context ===
The theme of the cosmic pluralism was already present in ancient philosophy: Epicurus, in the Letter to Herodotus, accepted the existence of innumerable worlds. At the end of the 16th century, Giordano Bruno, in On the Infinite Universe and Worlds, defended the idea of an infinite universe populated by inhabited worlds.

At the end of the 17th century, the Copernican system was not yet universally accepted, and educated readers remained more familiar with the geocentric system of Ptolemy. The Entretiens were among the first works to popularise Copernican and Cartesian ideas in French.

=== Dissemination and translations ===
Translations published between the late 17th century and the 18th century show the European spread of the work. The first English translation, titled A Discourse of the Plurality of Worlds, was published in Dublin by Sir William Donville or Domville in 1687. The second translation, by Aphra Behn, appeared in 1688 under the title A Discovery of New Worlds and the third, by John Glanvill, later in 1688, titled A Plurality of Worlds. All three are translations of the first edition (1686). Fontenelle added more material in the second edition (1687). Elizabeth Gunning translated a later edition into English in 1803 as Conversations on the Plurality of Worlds.

The first printed Italian translation was published in Paris in 1748 by Annibale Antonini.

== Structure ==
The work is arranged as a series of evening conversations between a narrator and a marquise in a garden. Through dialogue, Fontenelle introduces astronomical themes gradually, alternating the narrator's explanations with examples and the marquise's objections.

The tone of the conversation alternates between scientific explanation, galanterie, and irony. Fontenelle often uses images drawn from everyday life and fashionable society to explain astronomical phenomena and philosophical concepts.

The division into six "evenings" combines the model of the philosophical and scientific dialogue with the forms of aristocratic conversation in the 17th century.

== Contents ==
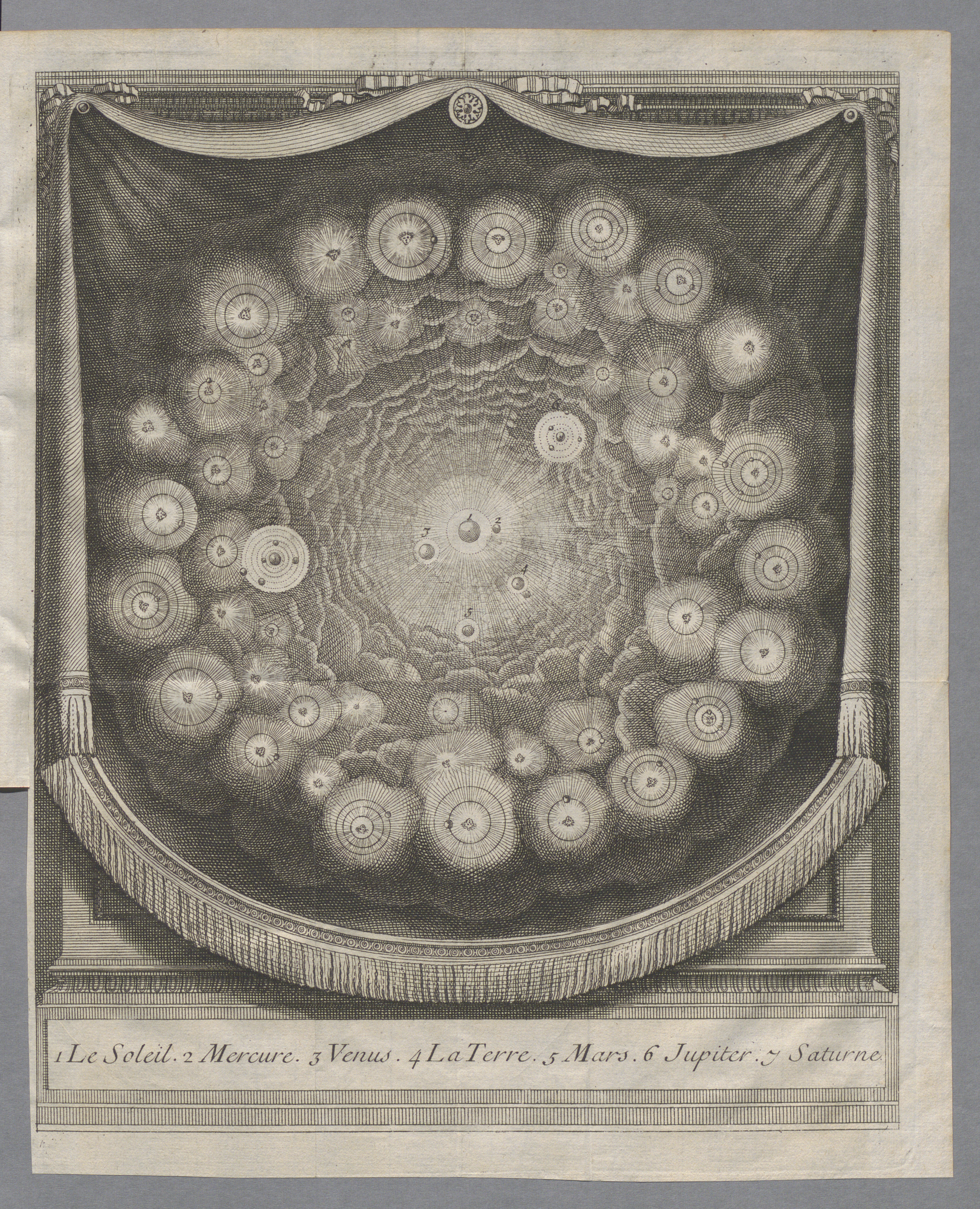
Astronomical plate showing the planetary system and the Cartesian theory of vortices.

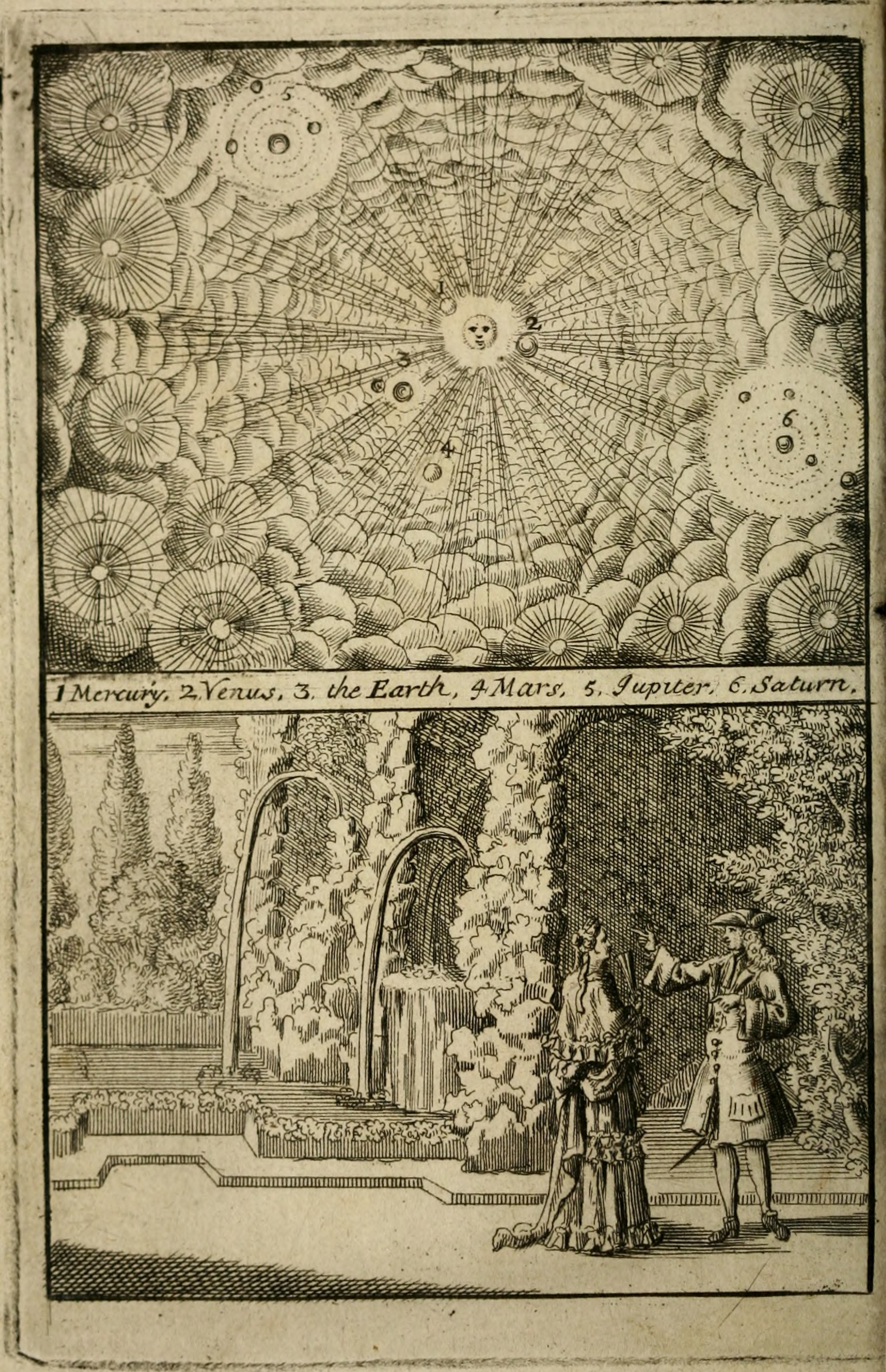
Engraving for the English edition of 1715.

In the first evening, the narrator introduces the Copernican system: the Earth is not motionless at the centre of the universe, but is a planet that turns on its axis and revolves around the Sun. Fontenelle presents this change of perspective as an exercise in reasoning rather than as a technical demonstration, and invites the reader not to stop at the immediate appearance of the senses.

In the second evening, the Moon is described as an inhabited Earth. The argument is not presented as an observational certainty, but as a hypothesis based on analogy between celestial bodies. The comparison between the Earth and the Moon introduces the hypothesis that other celestial bodies may also be inhabited.

In the third evening, the discussion focuses on the characteristics of the lunar world and extends to the other planets. The narrator develops the hypothesis that the planets may be distinct worlds, each with its own physical conditions and inhabitants. The hypotheses about the inhabitants of other planets make the astronomical exposition more concrete and challenge the central role traditionally assigned to the Earth.

In the fourth evening, Fontenelle surveys Venus, Mercury, Mars, Jupiter, and Saturn, adapting to each planet considerations about size, distance from the Sun, and possible conditions of life. The explanation remains tied to Cartesian physics and presents the Solar System as an ordered set of worlds.

In the fifth evening, the fixed stars are interpreted as other suns, each capable of illuminating a world of its own. The planetary model is thus extended beyond the Solar System. This extension also has a philosophical meaning: the universe is not built around the Earth, and humanity loses the central position assigned to it by traditional cosmology.

In the sixth evening, added in 1687, Fontenelle returns to the preceding arguments in light of new celestial observations. The dialogue refers to recent astronomical observations and connects them with the hypothesis of the plurality of worlds. Many statements remain presented as hypotheses, but Fontenelle contrasts probable reasoning and observation with the authority of tradition.

== Reception and criticism ==
The success of the Entretiens sur la pluralité des mondes was "exceptional", and the work had already gone through 33 editions during Fontenelle's lifetime. Conversations was Fontenelle's best-known work and contributed to the spread of the Copernican system, which was still not universally accepted in 1686. The scientific knowledge on which the work was based was, however, limited, and some of its data were incorrect even for the time.

Marie-Françoise Mortureux noted that in 1686 the Journal des sçavans placed Fontenelle among writers on logic and physics; she nevertheless reads the Entretiens also as a literary text, not only as a scientific exposition. According to Mortureux, the dialogue is not a simple ornament: the marquise's questions and objections guide the explanation and translate scientific language into fashionable conversation. Marc Hersant, reviewing Fabrice Chassot's study of the scientific dialogue in the 18th century, presents the Entretiens as a point of reference for the 18th-century scientific dialogue, in which the explanation of science passes through a narrative and conversational situation.

Serge Hochedez interpreted the irony of the Entretiens as a means of critically examining traditional authorities and training the reader in the exercise of doubt. For Hochedez, the dialogue between the narrator and the marquise does not merely set out an astronomical system, but accustoms the reader to doubt and to distance from traditional authorities.

In her review of the critical edition prepared by Robert Shackleton, Suzanne Delorme noted that its introduction reconstructs both the Cartesian theory of vortices and the precedents represented by John Wilkins and Pierre Borel, adding that the scientific data used by Fontenelle in 1686 were far from exact. The historical interest of the work therefore lies above all in the way Fontenelle transformed an astronomical and philosophical debate into a conversation accessible to non-specialist readers.

The Entretiens were placed on the Index Librorum Prohibitorum in 1687; Giuseppe Tanzella-Nitti connects this measure with the cautions of 17th-century theological debate on the plurality of inhabited worlds.

== Editions ==
Partial list.

=== French editions ===
Title page of the 1724 edition.

- Entretiens sur la pluralité des mondes (in French). Paris: Vve C. Blageart. 1686. First edition, with five evenings.
- Entretiens sur la pluralité des mondes (in French) (Nouvelle édition augmentée de pièces diverses ed.). Paris: Michel Brunet. 1724. Described as the seventh edition.
- "Entretiens sur la pluralité des mondes". Œuvres diverses de M. de Fontenelle (in French). Vol. 1. 1736. ICCU CFIE021193.
- "La Pluralité des mondes". Œuvres de monsieur de Fontenelle, des academies, francaise, des sciences (in French). Vol. 2. 1742. ICCU BA1E015051.
- Entretiens sur la pluralité des mondes (in French). Paris: veuve Regnard. 1769.
- "Entretiens sur la pluralité des mondes". Œuvres de Fontenelle (in French). Vol. 1. London. 1784. ICCU LO1E045365.
- Entretiens sur la pluralité des mondes, suivis des Dialogues des morts (in French). Vol. 1. Paris: Hiard. 1831. ICCU UBO3077703.
- Entretiens sur la pluralité des mondes, suivis des Dialogues des morts (in French). Vol. 2. Paris: Hiard. 1831. ICCU UBO3077704.
- Entretiens sur la pluralité des mondes (in French). Paris: Gustave-Germer Baillière. 1850.
- Entretiens sur la pluralité des mondes (in French). Paris: Librairie de la Bibliothèque nationale. 1899.
- Shackleton, Robert, ed. (1955). Entretiens sur la pluralité des mondes; Digression sur les Anciens et les Modernes (in French). Oxford: Clarendon Press.
- Calame, Alexandre, ed. (1966). Entretiens sur la pluralité des mondes (in French). Paris: Didier.
- Niderst, Alain, ed. (1991). Œuvres complètes (in French). Vol. 2. Paris: Fayard. ICCU TO00334668.
- Martin, Christophe, ed. (1998). Entretiens sur la pluralité des mondes (in French). Paris: Garnier-Flammarion. ISBN 9782080710246.

=== Translations ===
==== Czech ====
- Rozhovory o mnohosti světů (in Czech). Brno-Prague: Masaryk University; Togga. 2020. ISBN 9788074761768.

==== Greek ====
- Ὁμιλίαι περὶ πληθύος κόσμων (in Greek). Translated by Panagiotis Kodrikas. Vienna: Ελληνική Τυπογραφία Γεωργίου Βενδότη. 1794.

==== English ====
- A Discovery of New Worlds. Translated by Aphra Behn. London: William Canning. 1688.
- Conversations on the Plurality of Worlds. London. 1761.
- Conversations on the Plurality of Worlds. Translated by Elizabeth Gunning. London: J. Cundee. 1803.

==== Italian ====
- Trattenimenti sopra la pluralità de' mondi (in Italian). Translated by R. G. manuscript translation preserved at the Biblioteca Universitaria di Bologna, ms. 3768. 1730.
- Ragionamento sù la pluralità de' mondi (in Italian). Translated by Annibale Antonini. Paris. 1748.
- Ragionamenti su la pluralità de' mondi (in Italian). Naples: nel Gabinetto Letterario. 1788.
- Trattenimenti sopra la pluralità de' mondi (in Italian). Venice: Antonio Zatta. 1797.
- Colloqui sulla pluralità dei mondi (in Italian). Translated by M. Monaldi. Lecce: Adriatica Editrice Salentina. 1978.
- Colloqui sulla pluralità dei mondi (in Italian). Bologna: Edizioni Studio Domenicano. 1994. ISBN 9788824100229.

==== Dutch ====
- Redenvoeringe over verscheidene Waerelden in 't Geheel-Al (in Dutch). Translated by A. B. Amsterdam: Nicolaas ten Hoorn. 1702.
- Reden-voeringe over verscheidene waerelden, in 't geheel-al (in Dutch). Translated by Abraham Boekholt (2nd ed.). Dordrecht: Hendrik Walpot. 1728.
- Redenvoering (by wyze van gesprekken) over verscheide Waerelden in 't Geheel-Al (in Dutch) (3rd ed.). Amsterdam: Steven van Esveldt. 1765.

==== Polish ====
- Rozmowy o wielości światów (in Polish). Translated by Eustachy Dębicki. Warsaw: Drukarnia Pijarów. 1765.

==== Portuguese ====
- Conversações sobre a pluralidade dos mundos (in Portuguese). Translated by Francisca de Paula Possólo da Costa. Lisbon: Imprensa Nacional. 1841.
- Diálogos sobre a pluralidade dos mundos (in Portuguese). Translated by Denise Bottmann. Campinas: Editora da Unicamp. 1993. ISBN 8526802852.
- Diálogos sobre a pluralidade dos mundos (in Portuguese). Translated by Denise Bottmann (2nd ed.). Campinas: Editora da Unicamp. 2013. ISBN 9788526810327.

==== Russian ====
Russian translation of 1740.

- Разговоры о множестве миров господина Фонтенелла Парижской академии наук секретаря (in Russian). Translated by Antiokh Kantemir. Saint Petersburg: Imperial Academy of Sciences. 1740.

==== Spanish ====
Spanish edition of 1921.

- Conversaciones sobre la pluralidad de los mundos. Half title:Pluralidad de los mundos (in Spanish). Madrid: Imprenta de Villalpando. 1796.
- Conferencias sobre la pluralidad de mundos (in Spanish). Translated by Baldomero Mediano y Ruiz. Madrid: Librería de González y Ferriz. 1878.
- Francisco J. J. Benlloch, ed. (1891). Conversaciones sobre la pluralidad de los mundos (in Spanish). Translated by Santiago López y Muguiro (2nd ed.). Madrid: Imprenta del Boletín de Obras Públicas.
- Coloquios sobre la pluralidad de los mundos (in Spanish). Translated by Miguel Romero Martínez. Valencia: Prometeo Sociedad Editorial. 1914.
- Conversaciones sobre la pluralidad de los mundos. Colección Universal (in Spanish). Translated by Luis Gutiérrez de Arroyo. Madrid: Calpe. 1921.
- Luis Hernández Alonso, ed. (1963). Conversaciones sobre la pluralidad de los mundos (in Spanish). Madrid: Aguilar.
- Antonio Beltrán Marí, ed. (1982). Conversaciones sobre la pluralidad de los mundos (in Spanish). Madrid: Editora Nacional. ISBN 8427605951.
- Coloquios sobre la pluralidad de los mundos (in Spanish). Translated by Miguel Romero Martínez. Valladolid: Maxtor. 2018. ISBN 9788490015841. Facsimile reprint of the 1914 edition.

==== Swedish ====
- Samtal om flere werldar (in Swedish). Translated by Jeremias Wallenius (new edition enlarged with a sixth conversation ed.). Stockholm: P. J. Nyström. 1759.
- Samtal om världarnas mångfald (in Swedish). Translated by Jan Stolpe. Stockholm: Carmina. 1979. ISBN 9175280078.

==== German ====
- Herrn Bernhards von Fontenelle Gespräche von mehr als einer Welt (in German). Translated by Johann Christoph Gottsched. Leipzig: Bernhard Christoph Breitkopf. 1726.
- Johann Elert Bode, ed. (1780). Dialogen über die Mehrheit der Welten (in German). Translated by Wilhelm Christhelf Siegmund Mylius. Berlin: Christian Friedrich Himburg.

== See also ==
- Astrobiology
- Cosmology in philosophy
- Heliocentrism
- History of science fiction
- Planetary habitability
- Cosmic pluralism
- Popular science
- Venus in fiction
