= Pietje Baltus =

Dutch missionary

Pietronella "Pietje" Baltus

Personal life
- Born: 5 December 1830 Near Beesd, Netherlands
- Died: 26 March 1914 (aged 83)
- Parent: Miller of De Vrijheid
- Known for: Role in the Converting Abraham Kuyper to Reformed Christianity

Religious life
- Religion: Pietistic Calvinism

Pietronella "Pietje" Baltus (5 December 1830 – 26 March 1914) was a Dutch peasant, known for her pivotal role in the conversion of Abraham Kuyper to orthodox Christian belief.

She was born near Beesd, the daughter of the miller of De Vrijheid. She was a staunch pietistic Calvinist. When Kuyper came to Beesd in 1863 to pastor the Reformed church there, Baltus stopped attending services. When Kuyper asked her why, she told him, "You do not give us the true bread of life." This led to a series of conversations in which Baltus explained orthodox Reformed Christian belief to Kuyper, which contributed to Kuyper coming to a conviction of the truth of the Reformed faith.

Kuyper was reported to have kept a picture of Baltus on his desk for the rest of his life. He arranged for her to receive a government pension when she was elderly. Kuyper wrote an obituary for her in De Standaard, noting that "one child of God, however insignificant by the world's standards, can be like the morning star, again bringing radiance into the night of the church's life."

Baltus never married. There is a street named after her in Beesd.
