= Frances Mabel Robinson =

English novelist, critic and translator

- Born: 1858; Royal Leamington Spa, England
- Died: 1954 (aged 95–96); Paris, France
- Occupations: Novelist, literary critic, translator
- Writing career
- Pen name: WS Gregg
- Notable works: Mr Butler's Ward; The Plan of Campaign; a Story of the Fortune of War; A Woman of the World: An Everyday Story; Disenchantment: an every-day story Hovenden, V.C., the Destiny of a Man of Action: A Novel; Chimâera. A Novel

Frances Mabel Robinson (1858–1954), who wrote some of her works by the pen name WS Gregg, was an English novelist, critic and translator.

== Life ==
Born and brought up at Milverton, Royal Leamington Spa, England, she was the younger sister of the poet Agnes Mary Frances Robinson (later Duclaux).

After studying at the Slade School of Art, she moved to literature and wrote a series of novels in the 1880s-1890s, largely on Irish political themes. She was also a frequent contributor to the Athenaeum, and wrote a non-fiction book Irish History for English Readers.

In 1897 she moved to live near her widowed sister in Paris, where she stayed for the rest of her life except for a temporary move to Aurillac during World War Two.

== Works ==
- Mr. Butler's Ward, 1885
- Irish History for English Readers: from the earliest times to 1855, 1886. (As Wm. Stephenson Gregg)
- The Plan of Campaign; a Story of the Fortune of War, 1888 ("an Irish story written under the influence of the Home Rule movement" - Times obituary)).
- A Woman of the World: An Everyday Story, 1890 (as "WS Gregg")
- Disenchantment: an every-day story, 1890 ("a realistic study of the demoralization of a character by drink" - Times obituary). J. B. Lippincott & Co., Philadelphia, 1890.
- Hovenden, V.C., the Destiny of a Man of Action: A Novel, 1891 (as "WS Gregg").
  "The destiny of a man of action, in the case of 'Hovenden, V. C.,' is a varied one. He goes out to fight the Zulus, wins his Victoria cross, and comes home to fall in love with Althea Rodrigues and to lose her and one leg—the latter lost in consequence of an accident. Althea marries a Dr. Sugden, with whom she lives unhappily and from whom she elopes with Hovenden. His friends cut him, Althea dies, he enters a monastery, quits it because he does not like to wash dishes in greasy water, and marries an old flame of his boyhood" - The Critic, 16 Jan 1892. Also Published in 1892 by Heinemann and Balestier, Leipzig and 1894 by Methuen & Co., London, both of these under her own name, F. Mabel Robinson.
- Chimâera. A Novel, 1895
- A woman of the world : an every-day story, 1898

== Translations ==
- The Trianon of Marie Antoinette... T. Fisher Unwin, London, 1925.
- Passion and Peat-La Brière... Translated by F. Mabel Robinson, Thornton Butterworth, London, 1927.
- The Memoirs of Queen Hortense... Co-Translated with Arthur Kingsland Griggs, 1927.
