= La Brière =

1923 novel by Alphonse de Chateaubriant

Passion and Peat
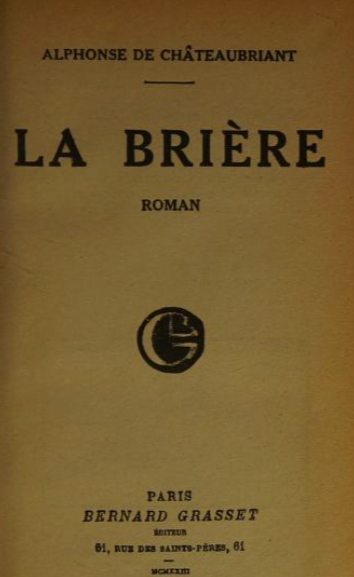
- Title page for La Brière (1923)
- Author: Alphonse de Chateaubriant
- Original title: La Brière
- Translator: F. Mabel Robinson
- Illustrator: René-Yves Creston (1926)
- Language: French
- Publisher: Butterworth
- Publication date: 1923
- Publication place: France

La Brière (translated as Passion and Peat) is a 1923 novel by Alphonse de Chateaubriant that won the Grand prix du roman de l'Académie française for that year.

The novel is set in the rustic fenland landscape west of Nantes, known as Brière, in which the traditional occupation of peat-cutting is becoming increasingly unsustainable as the peat runs out. The independence of the local population is threatened by outsiders, who have plans for modernisation.

== Synopsis ==
Aoustin, a rough peat-cutter and "ranger" employed to protect the traditional rights of the people of Brière, comes into conflict with his wife and daughter. Having returned home to the ile de Fédrun after a long trip, he discovers that his wife, Nathalie, has sold the family linen to fund their estranged son who lives in Nantes. The domineering Aoustin had cursed his son for marrying a Nantes girl, rather than a local Brièronne. His daughter Théotiste now also wants to marry a lad from outside the region, from a despised village of basket weavers, who are traditionally looked down upon by the independent-minded fenlanders. Aoustin utterly refuses to give her hand in marriage to the youth, Jeanin. He leaves his wife and daughter, moving into his childhood cottage, rejoicing in his independence and the traditional ways of fenland life.

Meanwhile, the local mayors are attempting to resist a drainage and modernisation project that threatens the independence of the Brièrons. Aoustin is given the task of finding a lost historical document signed by Louis XVI confirming the rights of the local people. He travels throughout the fens to find whether any of the locals possess it, eventually locating it in the home of Florence, a madwoman who lives inside an ancient dolmen.

Théotiste seeks Aoustin out, telling him that she is pregnant by Jeanin, but he still refuses to assent to the marriage, insisting that he will curse the couple. The superstitious Théotiste takes this threat seriously since her brother's wife died after her father's curse. Aoustin also contrives to have Jeanin arrested for poaching ducks. Jeanin seeks revenge, and when Aoustin is sent to Nantes to deposit the document Jeanin shoots him during his return journey. Théotiste, anxiously seeking Jeanin, gets lost in the marshes, suffers a miscarriage, and spends the night sheltering in Florence's dolmen. Aoustin survives the shooting, but loses his hand. He refuses to give Jeanin up to the police, but seeks revenge himself.

Théotiste is accused by a spiteful neighbour of having given birth and drowned her child in the marsh. She is arrested, but released through lack of evidence. Jeanin now refuses to marry her because of her "shame", and Théotiste is shunned by most of the community. Aoustin has a false wooden hand made to replace his loss. He kidnaps Jeanin, intending to kill him and bury him under his cottage, but news arrives that Théotiste has had a mental breakdown. He locks Jeanin up, and attempts to take the deranged Théotiste through the marshes to a hospital. He cannot control his boat adequately with his wooden hand, and gets lost in the freezing cold marsh. During the night Théotiste dies. In despair, Aoustin returns to his cottage but cannot bring himself to kill Jeanin. He lets him go.

== Other versions ==
The novel was filmed in the year after its publication by Léon Poirier in a style of pictorialist naturalism. The music from the film by Paul Ladmirault was published as the Symphonic poem, La Brière.

In 1926 an edition illustrated by René-Yves Creston was published. In 1927, the London publisher Thornton Butterworth published the English translation by Frances Mabel Robinson.
