= Anton van Dale =

Dutch minister (1638–1708)

Anton van Dale (Anthonie, Antonius) (8 November 1638, in Haarlem – 28 November 1708) was a Dutch Mennonite preacher, physician and writer on religious subjects, described by the contemporary theologian Jean Le Clerc as an enemy of superstition. He was a critic of witch-hunting.

His De oraculis veterum ethnicorum dissertationes (1683) was an influential work on oracles, which he argued against the supernatural and the role of the Devil in the pagan oracular tradition. In this he was followed two decades later by Fontenelle, who wrote his Histoire des oracles as an adaptation and popularized version of van Dale's work.

== Works ==
- De oraculis veterum ethnicorum dissertationes (1683)
- Dissertationes de origine ac progressu Idolatriae et Superstitionum, de vera ac falsa Prophetia, uti et de Divinationibus Idolatricis Judaeorum (1696)
- Commentatio super Aristeam de LXX interpretibus (1705)
- Dissertatio super Aristea de LXX interpretibus (1705)
