= En Forêt =

En Forêt (In the Forest) is an impressionist symphonic poem by Paul Ladmirault written in 1931, at the age of 54. It is a diptych inspired in Camille Lemonnier's 1881 novel Un Mâle. The two pieces are respectively titled L'Aurore (Dawn) and Les Amants (The Lovers). It was premiered on 31 January 1932 by the Paris Symphony conducted by Eugène Bigot.

== Discography ==
- 2000: Brittany Orchestra – Stefan Sanderling (Pierre Verany)
- 2008: Orchestre National de Bretagne – Stefan Sanderling (R10 Classica)
