= Vrijheid =

Vrijheid may refer to:

- Dutch ship Vrijheid, a 1782 ship of the line of the navy of the Dutch Republic, the Batavian Republic, and the Royal Navy
- De Vrijheid (disambiguation), several windmills in the Netherlands

== See also ==
- Vryheid, South Africa
- Party for Freedom (Dutch: Partij voor de Vrijheid), a Dutch political party founded in 2005
- Freedom Party (Netherlands) (Dutch: Partij van de Vrijheid), a Dutch political party active from 1946 to 1948
