= De Vrijheid =

De Vrijheid (English: The Freedom) may refer to:

- De Vrijheid, Beesd, a windmill in Gelderland, Netherlands
- De Vrijheid, Schiedam, a windmill in Schiedam, South Holland, Netherlands

== See also ==
- Vrijheid (disambiguation)
