= Suite (music) =

Ordered set of classic musical pieces in a concert

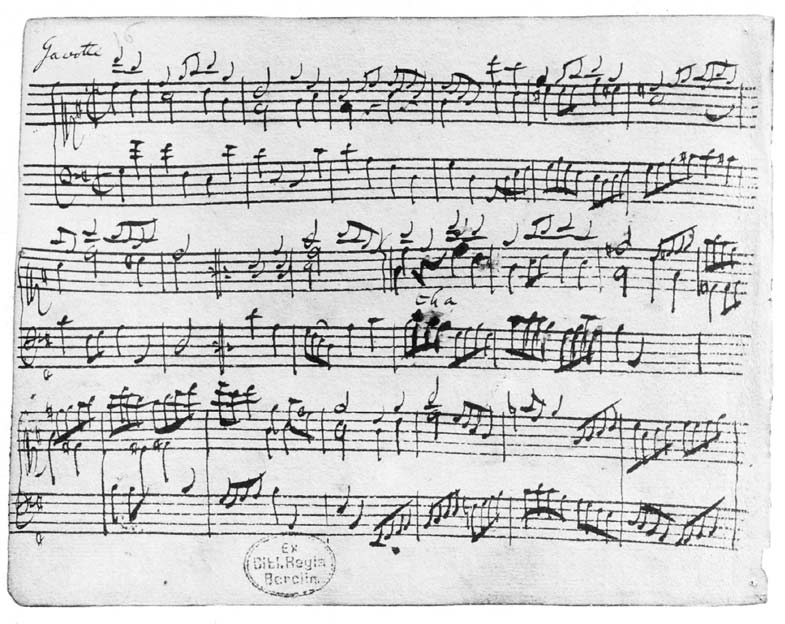
Gavotte from J.S. Bach's French Suite No. 5

A suite, in Western classical music, is an ordered set of instrumental or orchestral/concert band pieces. It originated in the late 14th century as a pairing of dance tunes; and grew in scope so that by the early 17th century it comprised up to five dances, sometimes with a prelude. The separate movements were often thematically and tonally linked. The term can also be used to refer to similar forms in other musical traditions, such as the Turkish fasıl and the Arab nuubaat.

In the Baroque era, the suite was an important musical form, also known as Suite de danses, Ordre (the term favored by François Couperin), Partita, or Ouverture (after the theatrical "overture" which often included a series of dances) as with the orchestral suites of Christoph Graupner, Telemann and J.S. Bach.

During the 18th century, the suite fell out of favour as a cyclical form, giving way to the symphony, sonata and concerto. It was revived in the later 19th century, but in a different form, often presenting extracts from a ballet (Nutcracker suite), the incidental music to a play (L'Arlésienne, Masquerade), opera, film (Lieutenant Kije Suite) or video game (Motoaki Takenouchi's 1994 suite to the Shining series), or entirely original movements (Holberg Suite, The Planets).

== History ==
Estienne du Tertre published suyttes de bransles in 1557, giving the first general use of the term "suite" 'suyttes' in music, although the usual form of the time was as pairs of dances. The first recognizable suite is Peuerl's Newe Padouan, Intrada, Dantz, and Galliarda of 1611, in which the four dances of the title appear repeatedly in ten suites. The Banchetto musicale by Johann Schein (1617) contains 20 sequences of five different dances. The first four-movement suite credited to a named composer, Sandley's Suite, was published in 1663.

=== Baroque era ===
The Baroque suite consisted of allemande, courante, sarabande, and gigue, in that order, and developed during the 17th century in France, the gigue appearing later than the others. Johann Jakob Froberger is usually credited with establishing the classical suite through his compositions in this form, which were widely published and copied, although this was largely due to his publishers standardizing the order; Froberger's original manuscripts have many different orderings of the movements, e.g. the gigue preceding the sarabande. The publisher's standardized order was, however, highly influential especially on the works of Bach.

Many later suites included other movements placed between sarabande and gigue. These optional movements were known as galanteries: common examples are the minuet, gavotte, passepied, and bourrée. Often there would be two contrasting galanteries with the same name, e.g. Minuet I and II, to be played alternativement, meaning that the first dance is played again after the second (but without the internal repeats), thus I, II, I.

The later addition of an overture to make up an "overture-suite" was extremely popular with German composers; Telemann claimed to have written over 200 overture-suites, Christoph Graupner wrote 86 orchestral overture-suites and 57 partitas for harpsichord, J.S. Bach had his four orchestral suites along with other suites, and Handel put his Water Music and Music for the Royal Fireworks in this form. Handel wrote 22 keyboard suites; Bach produced multiple suites for lute, cello, violin, flute, and other instruments, as well as English suites, French suites and Partitas for keyboard. François Couperin's later suites (which he called "Ordres") often dispensed entirely with the standard dances and consisted entirely of character pieces with fanciful names.

=== 18th and 19th century ===
By the 1750s, the suite had come to be seen as old-fashioned, superseded by the symphony and concerto, and few composers were still writing suites during that time. But since the 19th century, composers have frequently arranged ballets, operas, and other works into suites for concert performance. Arrangement into a suite can make the music more accessible and available to a wider audience, and has greatly helped popularize the music itself, such as in Tchaikovsky's suite from The Nutcracker, or Aaron Copland's suite from Appalachian Spring. Suites for orchestra or concert band usually consist of one or more movements. An example is Grieg's Peer Gynt Orchestral Suites I and II, each consisting of four movements. Such suites may consist of

- an instrumental selection from a larger work such as an opera, ballet, film score, or musical;
- a sequence of smaller pieces tied together by a common theme, such as the nationalistically inflected suites of Grieg, Sibelius, or Tchaikovsky and The Planets by Holst;
- a work deliberately referential of Baroque themes, as in the mischievous Suite for Piano by Schoenberg.

Carl Nielsen made a Suite for String Orchestra his Opus 1 in 1888 at the age of 23. In the late 19th century, Sibelius's Karelia Suite was written for the students of the Helsinki university.

=== 20th century ===
Brought on by Impressionism, the piano suite was reintroduced by early 20th-century French composers such as Ravel and Debussy. Debussy's Pour le piano is a suite in three movements, published in 1901, and his Suite bergamasque, revised in 1905, is probably one of the most famous suites, especially the third movement, Clair de Lune. Ravel is particularly well known for his Miroirs suite for piano and lesser known for Le tombeau de Couperin, both requiring tremendous skill and dexterity from the pianist.

Arnold Schoenberg's first use of the twelve-tone technique throughout an entire work was in his Suite for Piano, op. 25. Modeled on the Baroque keyboard suite, the piece consists of six movements entitled Präludium (Prelude), Gavotte, Musette, Intermezzo, Menuett (Minuet, with Trio), and Gigue.

Other famous examples of early 20th-century suites are The Planets by Gustav Holst, a "Suite for Orchestra" in which each piece represents the astrological significance of one of the seven uninhabited planets then known, as well as his First Suite in E-flat and Second Suite in F for Military Band.

There are as well several examples of suites being used in the jazz genre. Perhaps the most notable composer is Duke Ellington/Billy Strayhorn, who produced many suites, amongst them: Black, Brown and Beige, Such Sweet Thunder, The Far East Suite, the New Orleans Suite, the Latin American Suite, and many more. Suites are also used in free jazz (Max Roach: Freedom Now Suite, Don Cherry, John Coltrane's A Love Supreme, etc.).

Another example of a suite in the 20th-century would come from the progressive rock band Pink Floyd. Their 1970 album Atom Heart Mother included the epic 23-minute-long suite of the same name on the first side of the record.

== Dance suite ==
The dance suite was a collection of dance music popular in the Baroque era. It consists of the following movements in this order:

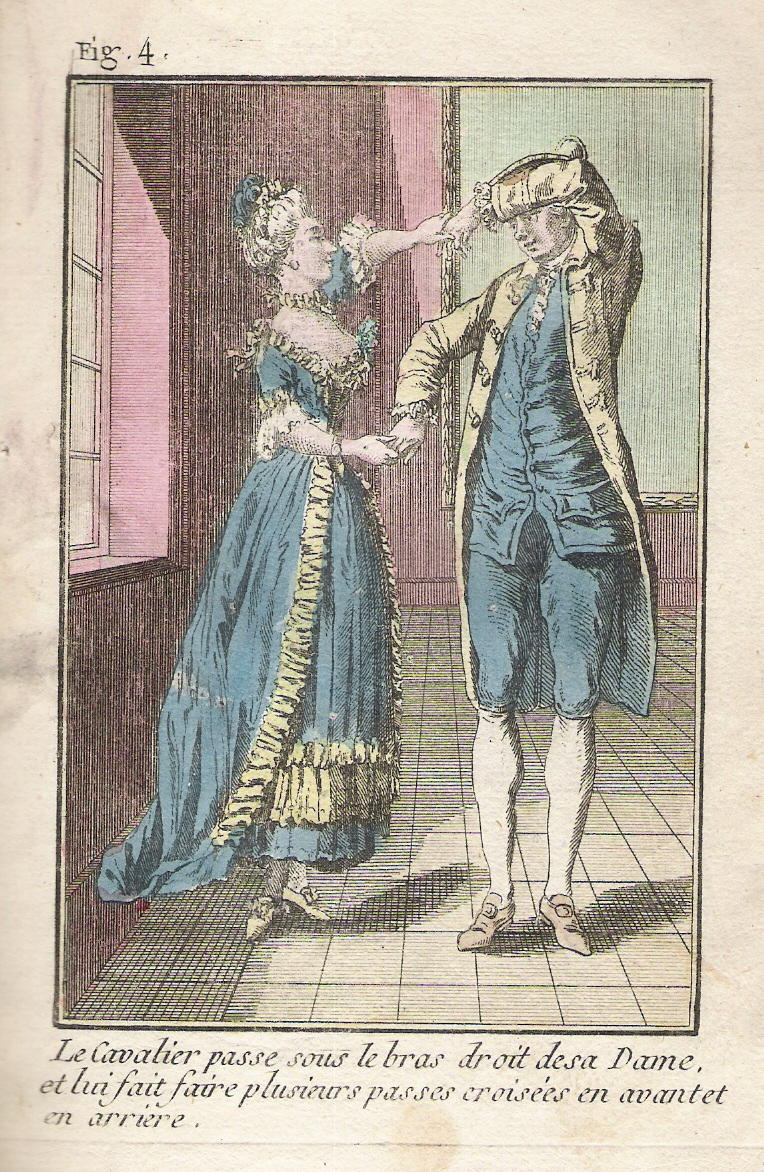
Allemande.

- Allemande: Allemande literally translates from French as "German", but by the time of its canonization in the suite it was thoroughly French, and was archaic as an actual dance by the 17th century. It is a moderate dance with a meter of 4/4 characterized by uniform movement in sixteenth notes, a mostly homophonic texture, even rhythms, and a generally restrained mood.
- Courante or Corrente: A courante is a French word meaning "to run." In the French style, it is a rapid, highly structured dance written in compound meter featuring broken contrapuntal textures, characteristic hemiola effects implying 6/4 especially in its formulaic cadences, and bursts of motion over a moderate underlying pulse. The Italian style, which is sometimes spelled and recognized as Corrente, is in triple meter and is less complex, with a simpler harmonic structure, more uniform note values, more virtuosic character, and freer form than its French counterpart.
- Sarabande: A Sarabande is a slow, stately dance in triple meter, infrequently in 3/2. The Sarabande was originally a Spanish dance (inherited through Mexico) and was very lively and quick, but famously controversial owing to its perceived lascivious character. However, by the time of its inclusion in the suite via France around 1600, it had been totally reimagined as a sedate centerpiece. The Sarabande tends toward harmonic richness and lyrical melody.
- Gigue: The gigue or 'jig' originates in Britain and Ireland, and is a fast dance, almost always in compound time and/or triple meter, with 6/8 and 12/8 most common. However, the Gigue permits by far the most variation among the standard dances, with prominent examples in practically every time signature. The French gigue is characterized by a distinct jaunty dotted rhythm in 6/8 and invariably written in two-part counterpoint, whereas the Italian (sometimes 'Giga') is a more varied and virtuosic format with running small notes in acrobatic passages. The Italian style largely superseded the French by the early-mid 18th century, at which point German composers had established it as a showpiece for not only technical virtuosity but also contrapuntal complexity, with some of JS Bach's gigues nearly qualifying as proper fugues.

A suite may be introduced by a movement such as the following.

- Prelude
- Entrée (ballet): Sometimes an entrée is composed as part of a suite; but there it is purely instrumental music and no dance is performed. It is an introduction, a march-like piece played during the entrance of a dancing group, or played before a ballet. Usually in 4/4 time. It is related to the Italian 'intrada'.
- Overture

Between the Sarabande and Gigue, the following Galanteries may be included.

- Aire: a movement with a more song-like character as opposed to dance-like.
- Anglaise: a quick dance in duple meter.
- Badinerie: a brief quick dance in 2/4 time that merged with the Scherzo to give rise to a movement of fast tempo in duple meter common in the Romanticism as a substitute to the Minuet.
- Bourrée: A light, quick dance in 4/4 time. A bourée begins with the last beat of a bar and continues with two or three bars until the 4th beat of one bar takes a light stress giving a sense of return to the beginning of the rhythm structure.
- Chaconne (Chacona): a slow Spanish dance in triple meter, much used as a vehicle for variation on a repeated short harmonic progression with a short, repetitive, bass-line.
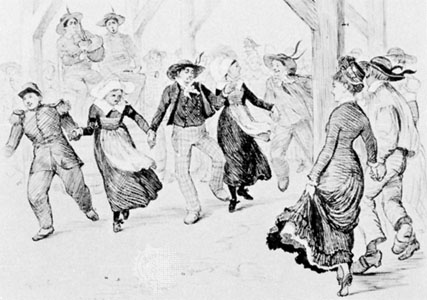
  Gavotte.
- Gavotte: The gavotte is a dance in 4/4 or related time signature. It begins on the third beat of an incomplete bar. It continues for a few bars where the third beat takes a light stress giving a sense of returning to the beginning of the rhythm structure. The gavotte tends to feature even staccato rhythms and has a charming rustic character.
- Intermezzi: This section consists of two to four dances at the discretion of the composer that may include a minuet, bourrée, polonaise, and/or a gavotte.
- Loure: a slow dance of French origin named after the instrument of the same name, though examples found in suites diverge almost completely from the idiom of that instrument. Sometimes likened to a 'slow gigue', the Loure is usually in 6/4.
- Minuet (Menuetto): A 3/4 dance in a stately and graceful manner. It is often short and simple often with only clear theme and little variation. In many suites there are two minuets, in such cases the first minuet is played with repeats, then follows the second minuet with repeats, then the first minuet is repeated (da capo) usually without repeats. This order is standard whenever an optional dance is doubled, but the practice is most common with Minuets. The Minuet is notable in surviving the transition to the Classical period, becoming standard as the third movement in the Sonata form which replaced the suite as the most prominent cyclical instrumental genre.
- Passacaglia (Pasacalles): a lively, often serious Spanish dance in 3/4 or 3/2 meter. Commonly based on a bass-ostinato.
- Passepied: A French dance movement in 3/8 or 9/8. The rhythm is almost always in quaver form. It begins on the last beat of an incomplete bar though the upbeat does not resolve until the end of each section (unlike the bourée or gavotte where there can be a resolution of the upbeat(s) every three or four bars. It is a light dance with a strong feeling of movement.
- Pavane: A slow dance in 4/4 or 2/2 time of Spanish and/or Italian origin.
- Polonaise: A dance in 3/4 which comes in cycles of two bars. A heavy stress is placed on the first beat of the first bar and a lighter stress is placed on the second beat of the second bar giving a slight feeling of disorientation.
- Siciliana (Sicilienne): A dance in 6/8 or 12/8 in which most of the dance is fixed to one of three typical rhythms involving syncopation and inversion of the rhythm structure. It is often in a minor key and somewhat sombre.

== Bach's Suites ==
Although J. S. Bach is not credited with the invention of the suite, he was still highly involved in its development. Bach's keyboard suites were some of the least complicated of his early pieces. During Bach's time, the suite was a new form with somewhat unstable terminology, which is one reason some of Bach's works were referred to as "suites" and "partitas" interchangeably. Another word that tends to be used synonymously is the French word "ouvertures," meaning "overture with a suite," specifically a suite in orchestral style. However, the English word "overture" simply refers to the opening movement of a work.

== See also ==
- List of musical medleys
- Dominical suite of songs
