= Agnes Mary Frances Duclaux =

Anglo-French writer (1857–1944)

- Born: 27 February 1857; Royal Leamington Spa, England
- Died: 9 February 1944 (aged 86); Aurillac, France
- Education: University College, London
- Spouses: James Darmesteter, Emile Duclaux

Agnes Mary Frances Robinson (known as Agnes-Marie-François Darmesteter after her first marriage, and Agnes Mary Frances Duclaux after her second; 27 February 1857 – 9 February 1944) was an Anglo-French poet, novelist, essayist, literary critic, and translator. She was the elder sister of the novelist and critic Frances Mabel Robinson.

== Life ==
Agnes Mary Frances Robinson was born in Leamington, Warwickshire, on 27 February 1857 to a wealthy architect. After a few years, the family moved to become a part of the artistic community growing in London. Robinson and her younger sister, Frances Mabel Robinson, shared an education under governesses and in Brussels until they attended one year at University College, London. The Robinson house became a central location for painters and writers of the Pre-Raphaelite movement, such as William Michael Rossetti, William Morris, William Holman Hunt, Edward Burne-Jones, James Abbott McNeill Whistler, Arthur Symons, Ford Madox Brown, and Mathilde Blind, to meet and cultivate a community of artists.

In 1876, Robinson met John Addington Symonds, who provided literary advice as she began her writing. Robinson's first book of poems, A Handful of Honeysuckle was published in 1878 and was greeted with much success. In 1880, the family travelled to Italy, where Robinson first met Vernon Lee (Violet Paget). During the 1880s, Robinson published a book of poetry almost every year, as well as her one novel Arden. She received most of her acclaim through her lyrics. In 1888, Robinson married James Darmesteter, a Jewish professor at the College de France and moved to Paris, France. Darmesteter translated much of Robinson's works into French during their marriage, and Robinson improved her own French where she eventually published her first original work in French, Marguerites du Temps Passé. During her stay in Paris, Robinson and her husband became involved in the Parisian literary society which included Hippolyte Taine, Ernest Renan, and Gaston Paris. After a brief 6 years married, Darmesteter died on 19 October 1894 from a short illness and left Robinson widowed at age 38. Robinson remained in France after Darmesteter died, and she wrote articles for the Revue de Paris, translated her late husband's work, and researched for a biography she wrote for Ernest Renan.

Robinson mingled with the scientific community of France as well, and in 1902 she married Emile Duclaux, a student of the biologist and chemist Louis Pasteur. Robinson became a part of Duclaux's scientific studies and assisted him in his writings. After Duclaux died in 1904, Robinson continued to delve more in France and French life, living among her stepchildren from Auvergne to Paris. For the next 20 years, Robinson wrote biographies of prominent artists, reviews of literature, and poetry collections. When war broke out in 1939, her stepchildren moved Robinson and her sister Mabel to a hiding place in Aurillac where she remained safe, peacefully writing French and English poetry. In 1943, Robinson underwent an operation for the removal of a double cataract from her eyes, but died 4 months later on 9 February 1944. Robinson died at the age of 86 and was buried in Aurillac.

== Personal relationships ==
Robinson formed many intimate relationships throughout her life. Her longest intimate relationship was shared with Vernon Lee (the pen name of Violet Paget). The two of them travelled between England, France, and Italy for 8 years until Robinson settled into married life with Darmesteter in Paris. Lee broke down after the initial marriage announcement and although she never fully recovered, she did renew her friendship once more through letters and some visits to Paris. In Bibliothèque nationale in Paris, 1,253 folio pages still exist of letters between Lee and Robinson and 1,100 of the pages are from 1880-1887 before Robinson's marriage to Darmesteter. The letters contain intimate terms such as "dear love" and "dear glory of my life".

Robinson and Lee also shared a close relationship with the author John Addington Symonds, who published articles on male homosexuality and worked closely with Havelock Ellis on his work Sexual Inversion. Although Symonds was married and openly homosexual, his letters show his appreciation of Robinson. He states in one such letter that Robinson was "a charming friend in every possible way: a more beautiful and gentle spirit I have never met with." Symonds mentored Robinson through her study of Greek language and literature at University College London. Symonds shared an intellectual relationship with Robinson and Lee, taking on the role of a teacher and critique of their works.

== Work ==
Robinson wrote hundreds of poems and ballads that are published in many different journals and books. Robinson published books of her own collected works in both English and French, and also wrote the first full-length biography of Emily Brontë to positive reviews. Robinson's poetry and lyrics were considered mostly part of the aestheticism intellectual movement. The movement reflects the significance of poetry as beautiful with no deeper meaning. In 1902, Robinson published Collected Poems, lyrical and narrative which held a short "Preface" written on the subject of poetry and authorship. Although Robinson comments that poetry should be written in at one's limit or "extremity", she admits this collection of poems were written over the span of 23 years and were "re-considered", "revised", and "re-written." She accepts that poets do not look for recognition today but "may find an audience to-morrow", recognizes her status in the sights of great poets such as Byron, Hugo, and Keats.

Robinson takes pride in being a lesser known poet that may create the minor works of sincerity. She says: "We cannot all be great poets; but the humblest, if they be sincere, may give a genuine pleasure." Robinson writes from what she sees and knows, and her aesthetic lyrics form as she comments "[t]hat life has been an Ode, of which these pages are the scattered fragments."

Robinson's most controversial collection of poems of her time was The New Arcadia. This collection of poems told the stories of a series of characters living in rural England. The poems tried to raise awareness to the rural poverty caused by the agricultural depression of the 1870s. Robinson investigated, with Lee, how poetry could invoke sympathetic compassion and understanding in the reader.

== List of Works ==
Cite:

- A Handful of Honeysuckle (1878)
- The Crowned Hippolytus (1881)
- Arden (1883)
- Emily Brontë. London: W. H. Allen & Co. 1883 – via Project Gutenberg.
- The New Arcadia and Other Poems (1884)
- An Italian Garden (1886)
- Margaret of Angoulême, Queen of Navarre (1886) (England)
- Margaret of Angoulême, Queen of Navarre (1887) (America)
- Poésies (1888) (translated to French by Darmesteter)
- Songs, Ballads and a Garden Play (1888)
- The End of the Middle Ages (1889)
- The New Arcadia (1890)
- Lyrics Selected from the Works of A. Mary. F. Robinson (1891) (translated to French by Darmesteter)
- Marguerites du Temps Passé (1892)
- Retrospect and Other Poems (1893)
- Froissart (1894) (French)
- Froissart (1895) (translated to English by E.F. Poynter)
- An Italian Garden (1897)
- A Medieval Garland (1897) (translated to English by Mary Tomlinson)
- The Life of Ernest Renan (1898) (English)
- La Vie de Ernest Renan (1898) (French)
- La Reine de Navarre, Marguerite d’Angoulême (1900) (translated to French by Pierre Mercieux)
- Grands Écrivains d’Outre-Manche (1901) (French)
- Collected Poems, Lyrical and Narrative (1902)
- The Fields of France (1903)
- The Return to Nature (1904)
- The Fields of France: extended (1905)
- La Vie de Émile Duclaux (1906)
- Songs from an Italian Garden (1908)
- The French Procession, a pageant of great writers (1909)
- The French Ideal, Pascal, Fénelon and other essays (1911)
- A Short History of France from Caesar’s Invasion to the Battle of Waterloo (1918)
- Twentieth Century French Writers (1919)
- Victor Hugo (1921)
- Images and Meditations, A book of poems (1923)
- The Life of Racine (1925)
- Victor Hugo (1925) (French)
- Portrait of Pascal (1927)
