= Jean-François Baltus =

Jean-François Baltus (8 June 1667 – 9 March 1743) was a French Jesuit theologian.

== Life ==
Baltus was born at Metz and entered the Society of Jesus on 21 November 1682. He taught humanities at Dijon; rhetoric at Pont-à-Mousson; and Scripture, Hebrew, and theology at Strasburg, where he was also rector of the university. In 1717, he was general censor of books at Rome, and later rector of Chalon, Dijon, Metz, Pont-à-Mousson, and Châlons. He died at Reims.

== Works ==
He left several works of Christian apologetics. Réponse à l'historie des oracles de M. de Fontenelle (Strasburg, 1707), was a critical treatise on the oracles of paganism, on which Fontenelle had written in Histoire des oracles. It was in refutation of Antonius van Dale's theory and in defense of the Fathers of the Church. He followed it in 1708 by Suite de la réponse à l'historie des oracles. According to Jonathan Israel:

Baltus, who for some time had distrusted Fontenelle, expressed outrage that he should openly admit borrowing ideas from Van Dale as if that were the most unexceptional thing in the world.

Others were:

- Défense des S. Pères accusés de platonisme (Paris, 1711); this is a refutation of Platonisme dévoilé, a work of the Protestant minister Jacques Souverain of Poitiers.
- Jugement des SS, Pères sur la morale de la philosophie païenne (Strasburg, 1719).
- La religion chrétienne prouvée par l'accomplissement des prophéties de l'Ancien et du Nouveau Testament suivant la méthode des SS. Pères (Paris, 1728).
- Défense des prophéties de la religion chrétienne (Paris, 1737).

To these may be added a funeral oration on the Most Rev. Peter Creagh, Roman Catholic Archbishop of Dublin (Strasburg, 1705), "The Acts of St, Balaam, Martyr", and the "Life of St. Frebonia, Virgin and Martyr" (Dijon, 1720 and 1721 respectively).
