= Sandley's Suite =

Sandley's Suite is a 17th-century four-movement suite credited as the first to be associated with a named composer. Consisting of an air, courante, sarabande and jig, it is included in the first edition of Musick's Hand-Maid (1663). Although only the final part is specifically credited—to "Mr. Ben: Sandley"—the entire suite is believed to have been composed by and is named for 17th-century English composer Benjamin Sandley.
