= Marcel Chadeigne =

French classical pianist and composer

Alexis Marcel Félicien Chadeigne (2 January 1876 – 2 January 1926) was a French classical pianist and composer.

He was composer Alain Bernaud's grandfather.

== Life ==
Born in the 18th arrondissement of Paris, son of the composer Félicien Chadeigne, he was a student of Charles de Bériot at the Conservatoire de Paris where he became a friend and fellow student of Ravel and Ricardo Viñes. After winning a first piano prize in 1895 and a second piano accompaniment prize in 1899, Chadeigne became a pianist, singing conductor (1901-1904), then assistant conductor and choir director at the Opéra de Paris (1909-1925), piano teacher at the Schola Cantorum de Paris and professor of solfège at the Conservatoire in 1919, a position from which he resigned in December 1924 for health reasons.

Chadeigne died one year later on his fiftieth birthday and was buried in the strictest privacy in the Père-Lachaise Cemetery

== Career ==
Apart from a few piano transcriptions of works for orchestra, there are no known original creations by Marcel Chadeigne or, at least, they have not been preserved. Between 1895 and 1925, he divided his time between a career as a concert performer, a singing master at the Opera, a professor of solfege at the Conservatory and a jury member in piano competitions. As a pianist, he is best known for his interpretations of works by Emmanuel Chabrier, Maurice Ravel and overall Claude Debussy who loved "the persuasive style and intelligent musicality of his performer.

His wife, Camille Mouveau singer at the Opera, led a career as a contralto with her husband sometimes accompanying her on stage. Their daughter Odette (1902-2002) was also a lyrical singer under the name "Miss Chadeigne".

== Awards ==
- Ordre des Palmes Académiques (3 January 1904 Ministerial decree)
