= Georges Baltus =

Belgian painter

- Born: Georges-Marie Baltus; 3 May 1874; Kortrijk, Belgium
- Died: 24 December 1967 (aged 93); Overijse, Belgium
- Occupation: Painter
- Children: Ado Baltus

Georges-Marie Baltus (3 May 1874, Kortrijk – 24 December 1967, Overijse) was a Belgian painter. His work was part of the painting event in the art competition at the 1932 Summer Olympics. His son was painter Ado Baltus.

== Further sources ==
- Leuvense kunst van de XX eeuw (exhibition catalogue), Leuven, 1971
- Georges-Marie Baltus 1874-1967, De Facto, 3, 1991
- N. Hostyn & CH. Giel: "Georges-Marie Baltus" in Allgemeines Künstlerlexikon, 6, Leipzig-München, 1992, p. 526
- P. Piron: De Belgische beeldende kunstenaars uit de 19de en 20ste eeuw. Uitgeverij Art in Belgium (1999), ISBN 9076676011
- L. Raskin: Een eeuw beeldende kunst in Limburg, Hasselt, 2004
