= Ado Baltus =

Belgian architect

- Born: 25 May 1918; Ixelles, Belgium
- Died: 17 September 1990 (aged 72); Milan, Italy
- Occupation: Architect
- Father: Georges Baltus

Jean Ado Baltus (25 May 1918 – 17 September 1990) was a Belgian architect and painter. His father was painter Georges Baltus.
