= Comœdia =

French literary and artistic newspaper

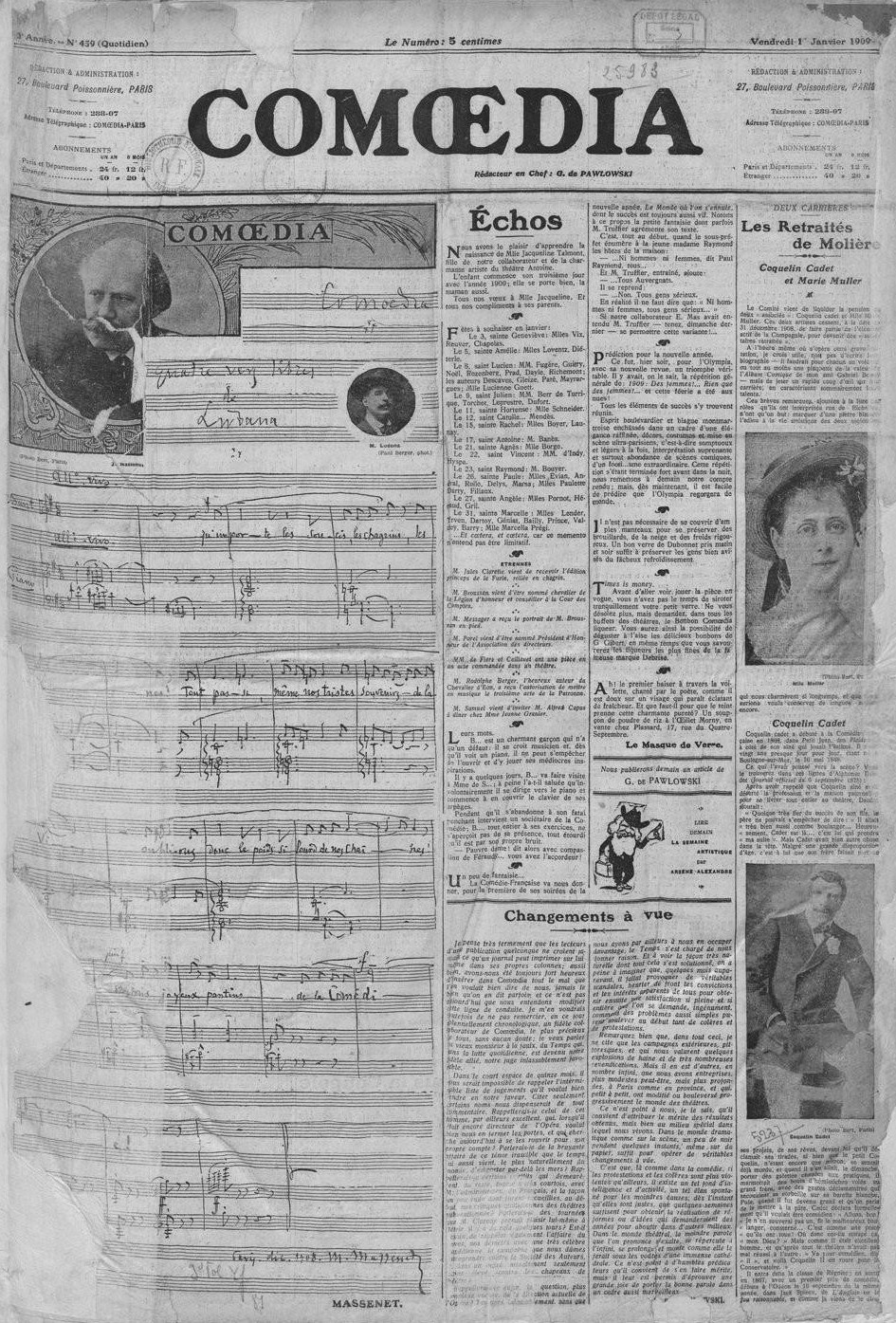
- Founder: Henri Desgrange
- Founded: 1 October 1907; 118 years ago
- Ceased publication: 1944; 82 years ago
- Language: French
- Headquarters: Paris
- Country: France

Comœdia was a French literary and artistic paper founded by Henri Desgrange on 1 October 1907 (Desgrange had already founded L'Auto). It published a number of texts by important literary figures, including Antonin Artaud's first publication on theatre, L'évolution du décor [The Evolution of Decor] (1924).^{:602} According to Richard Abel, it provides one of the most complete sources of cultural history in France just prior to World War I.

Comoedia Illustré was Comœdia's fortnight supplement which featured updates on current French fashion, music and theatre.
