= Mémoires d'un âne =

Novel written by Comtesse de Ségur

Memoirs of a Donkey
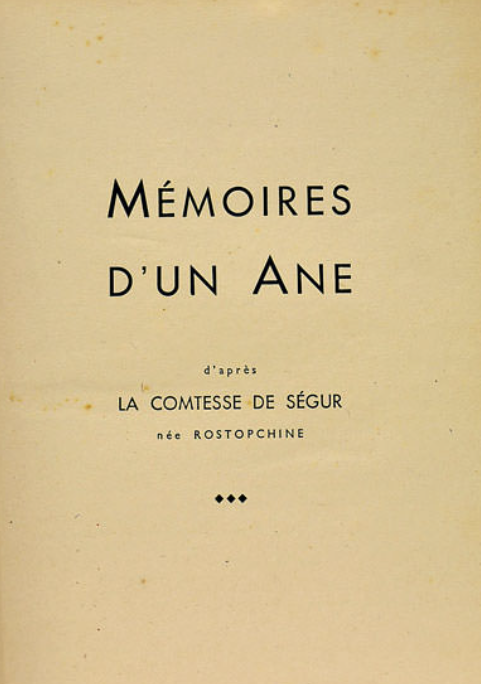
- Title page for Mémoires d'un âne (1946 edition)
- Author: Comtesse de Ségur
- Original title: Mémoires d'un âne
- Language: French
- Series: Bibliothèque rose illustrée
- Genre: Children's literature
- Publisher: Hachette
- Publication date: 1860
- Publication place: France
- Media type: Print
- Original text: Mémoires d'un âne at French Wikisource

Mémoires d’un âne (lit. 'Memoirs of a Donkey') is a novel written by the French author Comtesse de Ségur. The book was first published in 1860. It is a part of the Bibliothèque rose illustrée collection by the publishing house Hachette. The story is told in an autobiographical style, recounting the memoirs of Cadichon, a learned donkey who experiences numerous adventures.

== Plot summary ==
The story revolves around a donkey named Cadichon who writes his memoirs to narrate the adventures of his life with peasant wisdom and vivacity that some humans sometimes lack. At the beginning of the story, he tells that he has a mistress, a farmer who mistreats him. Therefore, he decides to escape and lives for a while in the woods. He will have other masters. Some will treat him well, and he will return the favor by being docile and helpful. For example, he saves little Pauline from a fire. However, if he is not treated well, the donkey does not let it go and retaliates. He is eventually taken in by Jacques and his cousins, who are staying in their grandmother's castle. He is happy there, but his vindictive and mocking side distances him from his masters. He injures little Auguste because he holds him responsible for the death of his friend, the dog Médor, accidentally shot during a hunting party. However, he realizes that he must change and behave better. He therefore decides to redeem himself with the little boy, whom he saves twice, once when he is pursued by dogs, and then when he is about to drown. From then on, Cadichon becomes truly good. The moral intended by the Comtesse de Ségur is clearly expressed in the novel: it is not enough to have wit or be resourceful: you must also and above all have a heart in order to be loved and to be happy.

== Adaptations ==
- Paul Ladmirault wrote an adaptation for piano and narrator Mémoires d’un âne, published in 1932.
- Cadichon, a French TV series, was aired starting from 1986.
