= Galanterie =

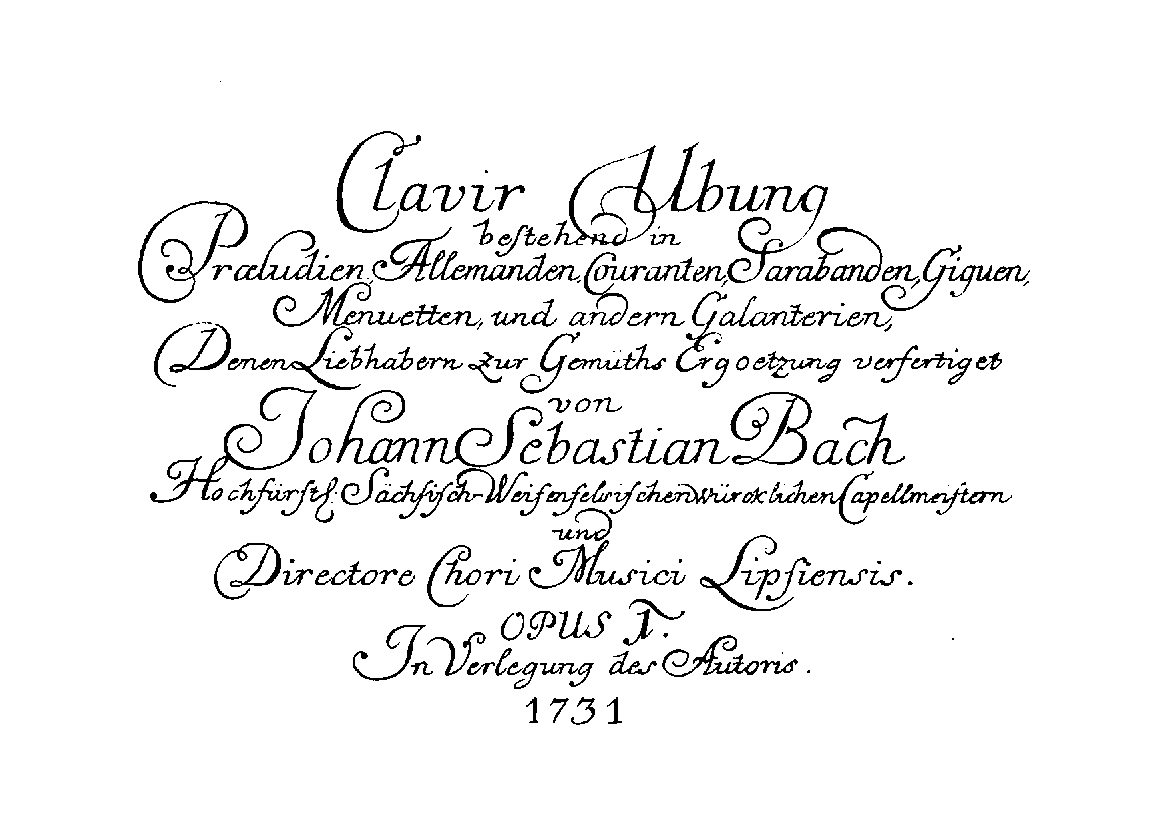
Title page of Bach's Clavier-Übung I

The term galanteries is sometimes used for movements in the Baroque dance suite whose inclusion is variable, unlike the fixed core of allemande, courante, sarabande and gigue. These pieces usually follow the sarabande.

In early 18th-century Germany, galanterien referred to any fashionable piece and later came to connote out-of-dateness. The narrower use described above seems to originate with a reading of Johann Sebastian Bach's title page description of his keyboard Partitas, "Clavier Übung, bestehend in Präludien, Allemanden, Couranten, Sarabanden, Giguen, Menuetten, und anderen Galanterien", in which it appears to be paired with minuets, whose place is often taken in Bach's suites by gavottes, bourrées, passepieds or other movements.

Examples of common galanteries include:

- Air
- Bourrée
- Gavotte
- Minuet
- Chaconne
- Passacaglia
- Passepied

== See also ==
- Galant
- Galante music
- Sonatas and partitas for solo violin (Bach)
