= De Vrijheid, Beesd =

Windmill in Beesd, Netherlands

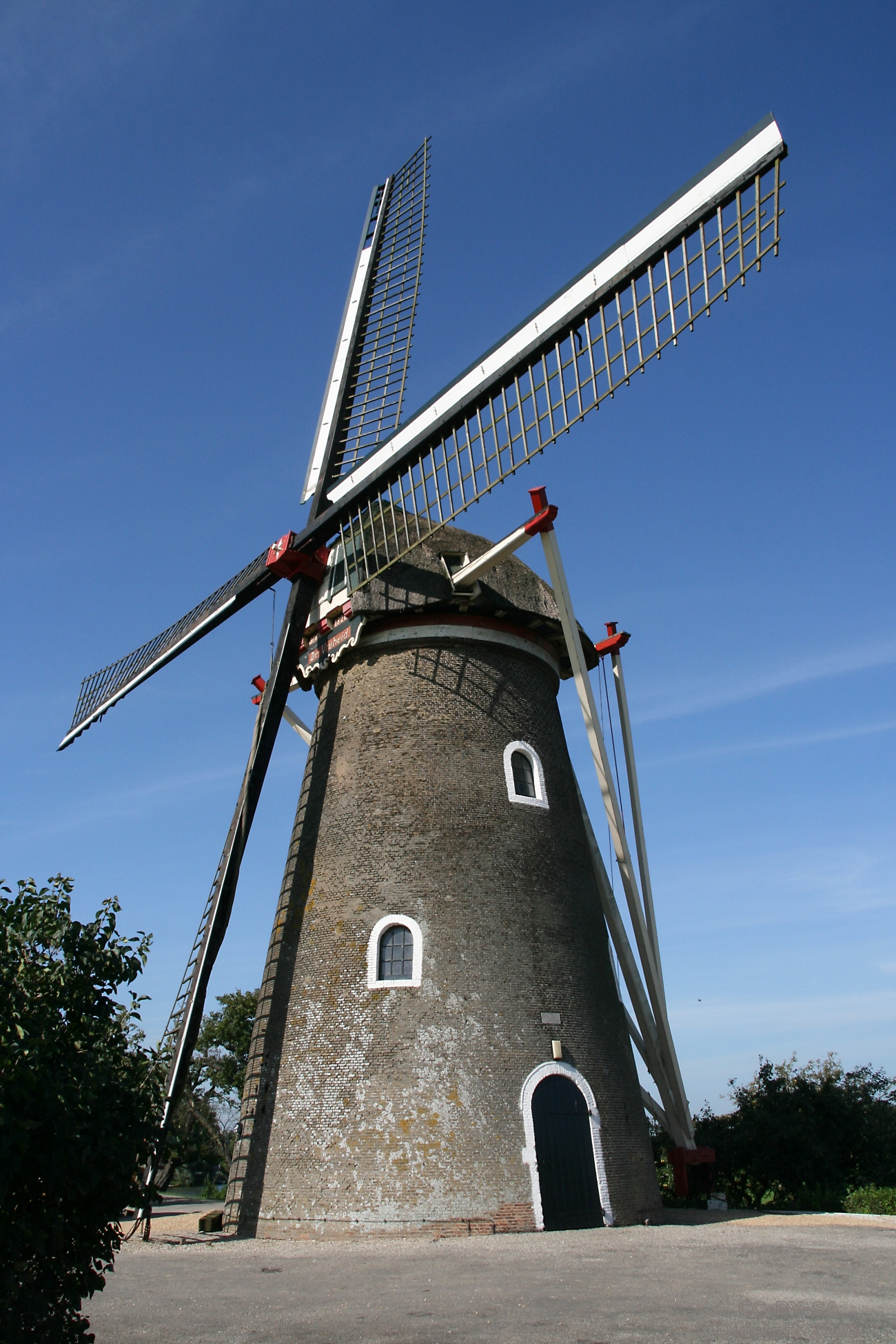
- The mill in September 2008

Origin
- Mill name: De Vrijheid
- Mill location: Molendijk 14, 4153 AV, Beesd
- Coordinates: 51°53′00″N 5°11′58″E
- Operator(s): De Heerlikk Mariënwaerdt
- Year built: 18th century

Information
- Purpose: Corn mill
- Type: Tower mill
- Storeys: Three storeys
- No. of sails: Four sails
- Type of sails: Common sails
- Windshaft: cast iron
- Winding: Tailpole and winch
- Auxiliary power: Electric motor
- No. of pairs of millstones: One pair
- Size of millstones: 1.60 metres (5 ft 3 in) diameter

De Vrijheid (English: The Freedom) is a tower mill in Beesd, Gelderland, Netherlands which was built in the 18th century and is in working order. The mill is listed as a Rijksmonument.

== History ==
The first mill on this site was built the 14th century. It belonged to Mariënweerd Abbey. It was compulsory for the local farmers to take their grain to the mill to be ground. The mill was built in the 18th century. In 1826, it was sold to Franciscus Moot of Leerdam, South Holland. It remained in the ownership of the Moot family until 1841. The mill was then bought by Jacobus Pendraat, who sold it in 1856 to A.D. Van Buuren. In 1938, it was sold to the Baroness van Verschuer. During World War II, the mill was used to send signals to the Dutch resistance. This was done by the position that the sails were set at. In 1965, Baroness van Verschuer left the mill to her brother's children. This brought the mill under the ownership of the abbey again. The mill was restored in 1968-69, gaining its name at this time. The mill has been worked regularly since 2009. It is listed as a Rijksmonument, № 16467.

== Description ==
De Vrijheid is what the Dutch call a "Grondzeiler". It is a three storey tower mill. There is no stage, the sails reaching almost down to the ground. The sails are Common sails, which have a span of 25.34 metres (83 ft 2 in). They are carried on a cast iron windshaft, which was cast by Penn & Bauduin in 1881. The windshaft also carries the brake wheel, which has 76 cogs. This drives a lantern pinion wallower with 42 staves, which is situated at the top of the upright shaft. At the bottom of the upright shaft is the great spur wheel, which has 106 cogs. This drives a pair of 1.60 metres (5 ft 3 in) Cullen millstones via a lantern pinion stone nut with 28 staves. The mill formerly drove a second pair of millstones, but these were replaced by an electrically powered hammer mill. The great spur wheel was formerly a brake wheel in a post mill.

== Millers ==
- Franciscus Moot (1826- )
- Mvw. Moot ( -1841)
- Jacobus Pendraat (1841–56)
- Van Buuren family (1856-1938)
- Van Beekhuizen family (1938–65)

References for above:-

== Public access ==
De Vrijheid is open by appointment.
