= Paul Ladmirault =

French composer and music critic

Paul Émile Ladmirault
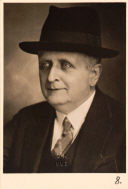
- Born: 8 December 1877; Nantes, France
- Died: 30 October 1944 (aged 66); Camoël, France
- Education: Conservatoire de Paris
- Occupations: Composer, critic
- Movement: Breton nationalism

Paul Émile Ladmirault (8 December 1877 – 30 October 1944) was a French composer and music critic whose music expressed his devotion to Brittany. Claude Debussy wrote that his work possessed a "fine dreamy musicality", commenting on its characteristically hesitant character by suggesting that it sounded as if it was "afraid of expressing itself too much". Florent Schmitt said of him: "Of all the musicians of his generation, he was perhaps the most talented, most original, but also the most modest". Peter Warlock dedicated his Capriol Suite to him and Swan Hennessy his Trio, Op. 54.

== Life ==
Ladmirault was born in Nantes. A child prodigy, he learned piano, organ and violin from an early age. At the age of eight, he composed a sonata for violin and piano. At the age of fifteen, when still a student of the Nantes High School, he wrote a three-act opera Gilles de Retz. It was first performed on 18 May 1893.

He was admitted to the Paris Conservatoire to study under Gabriel Fauré, learning harmony under Antoine Taudou and counterpoint from André Gedalge. He orchestrated a few works by Fauré. Like fellow students Maurice Ravel, Florent Schmitt, Louis Aubert, Jean Roger-Ducasse and Georges Enesco, he had become well known before he left the Conservatory. In 1903, he wrote a Breton Suite in three movements and then the Brocéliande de matin. These two works were orchestral extracts from his second opera Myrdhin (Merlin), an epic work which he worked on from 1902 to 1909, and continued to revise until 1921, but which has never been performed.

He also wrote Young Cervantes for small orchestra, Valse triste and Épousailles for piano and orchestra. The ballet La Prêtesse de Korydwenn (The Priestess of Ceridwen) was first performed at the Paris Opéra Garnier on 17 December 1926.

In the field of religious music, he wrote a brief mass for organ and choir and a Tantum ergo for voice, organ and orchestra.

He also wrote articles on music in various periodicals. Appointed professor of harmony and counterpoint at the Nantes conservatoire, Ladmirault rarely left the Nantes region, calling himself a "homebody" who disliked to travel.

He died in Kerbili en Kamoel, St. Nagoire, France.

== Breton Celticism ==
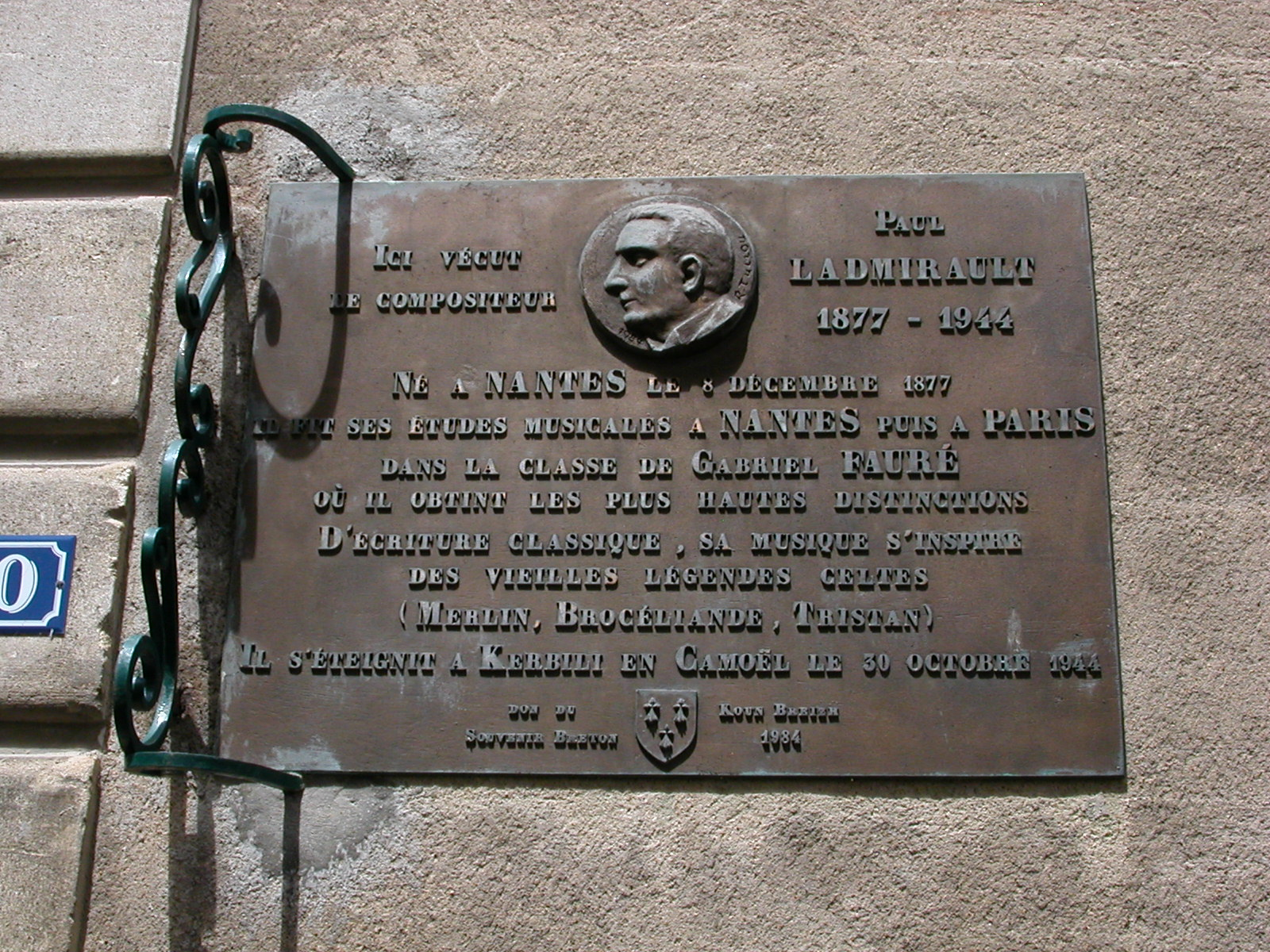
A plaque commemorating Ladmirault at his home in Nantes. It states, "he studied music in Nantes then at Paris under Gabriel Fauré, where he achieved the highest distinction. His music was inspired by classical literature and ancient Celtic legend (Merlin, Brocéliande, Tristan)."

All Ladmirault's music is imbued with his attachment to Brittany. It is found throughout his Gaelic Rhapsody, Briere, Forest and a symphony (1909). He was also closely associated with Breton nationalism. He advocated cultural autonomy for Brittany in the face of the centralisation of French culture in Paris and became a subscriber of the Breton fascist paper Breiz da Zont, an offshoot of the Breton Autonomist Party. He also joined the artistic group Seiz Breur. He was initiated into the Celtic esotericist movement led by François Jaffrenou. In 1908, the Gorsedd of Brittany nominated him as a Druid, and he took up the bardic name 'Oriav'. In 1912, Ladmirault was one of the founding members of the short-lived Association des Compositeurs Breton. He composed music on Celtic themes, such as the ballet La Prêtesse de Korydwenn and the symphonic poem he wrote as musical accompaniment for the film La Brière. He worked on translations of ancient Gallic texts.

In 1928, Ladmirault published a manifesto of Breton music in the first issue of the Celticist journal Kornog. He argued that Breton composers should follow the example of the Mighty Handful, the Russian nationalist musical group, by rejecting German and Italian musical models and relying on folk traditions and pentatonic scales. Nevertheless, he took the view that Breton folk music was cruder than its "civilised" Irish and Scottish counterparts. He justified his use of only Irish musical sources in his Celtic ballet La Prêtesse de Korydwenn, writing "several themes, jigs, war dances are Irish. You would find no borrowings from Breton folk music".

In 1929, he helped to found the Nantes Celtic Circle.

== Selected works ==
=== Opera and ballet ===
- Gilles de Retz, opera, performed at Nantes, 18 May 1893
- Myrdhin, opera, completed 1921 (never performed)
- La Prêtesse de Korydwenn, ballet performed by l'Opéra-Comique, 17 December 1926
- Glycères, operetta (Paris, 1928)

=== Orchestral music ===
- Symphony, four movements (1909)
- En Forêt, symphonic poem, performed Paris, 31 January 1932
- Suite bretonne (1903)
- Tristan et Iseult, incidental music (Nantes, 1929)
- Valse triste, for piano and orchestra, performed at Paris, 4 March 1934
- Brocéliande au matin, symphonic poem, Concerts Colonne, 28 November 1909
- Épousailles, for piano and orchestra
- La Brière, orchestral suite, 1925
- La Jeunesse de Cervantès, for small orchestra

=== Chamber music ===
- Fantaisie, for violin and piano (1899)
- Chevauchée, fantasia on Scottish reels, for piano trio
- Romance, for string quartet
- The River, for piano trio
- Mémoires d'un âne, after Sophie Rostopchine, Comtesse de Ségur
- Carillon (1929)
- Sonata for violin and piano (1931)
- String Quartet (1933)
- String Quintet (1933)
- De l'ombre à la clarté, for violin and piano (1935)
- Chorale et variations, for wind quintet and piano (1936)
- Sonata for violoncello and piano (1939)
- Sonata for clarinet and piano (1942)

=== Piano music ===
- Quatre Pièces (1900). Contains: Impromptu; Regrets; Plaisanterie; Valse fantastique.
- Rhapsodie gaélique, for piano duet (1903)
- Variations sur des airs de biniou trécorois (tirés du Recueil de Quellien), for piano duet (1907)
- Suite bretonne, for piano duet (1908) (arranged from opera Myrdhin)
- Musiques rustiques, for piano duet (1908)
- Quatre Esquisses (1909). Contains: Chemin creux; Valse mélancolique; Vers l'église dans le soir; Minuit dans les clairières
- Mémoires d'un âne (1930)
- Deux Danses bretonnes (1957)

=== Songs (voice and piano) ===
- J'ai peur de t'aimer (1900)
- Madrigal (1900)
- Spleen (1900)
- Lied (1901)
- Quelques chansons de Bretagne et de Vendée, 2 vols (1906)
- Quelques vieux cantiques bretons (1906)
- Noëlz anciens composés en l'honneur de Notre-Seigneur Jésus-Christ (1908)
- Mélodieux automne (1912)
- Gnomes (1912)
- Six cantiques bretons du XVIIe siècle (1926)
- Chansons écossaises (1927), also a version for choir
- Triolets à Catherine (1928)
- Chansons de marins (1931)

=== Other vocal music ===
- Old Melodies, for tenor, string quartet and piano (1897)
- Messe brève, for choir and organ
- Tantum ergo, for voice, organ and orchestra

== Bibliography ==
- Claude Debussy: "Paul Émile Ladmirault", in: Gil Blas (9 March 1903).
- Octave Séré: Musiciens français d'aujourd'hui (Paris: Mercure de France, 1921).
- Paul Landormy: La Musique française après Debussy (Paris: Gallimard, 1943).
- Gustave Samazeuilh: Musiciens de mon temps (Paris: M. Daubin, 1947).
- Robert Marot: Les Compositeurs bretons. Les Sources de leur inspiration (Nantes: CID Éditions, 1988); ISBN 2-904633-12-X.
- Mikael Bodlore-Penlaez, Aldo Ripoche: Musique classique bretonne (Spézet: Coop Breizh, 2012); ISBN 978-2-84346-563-5.
