= Bernard Le Bovier de Fontenelle =

French writer and philosopher of the enlightenment (1657–1757)

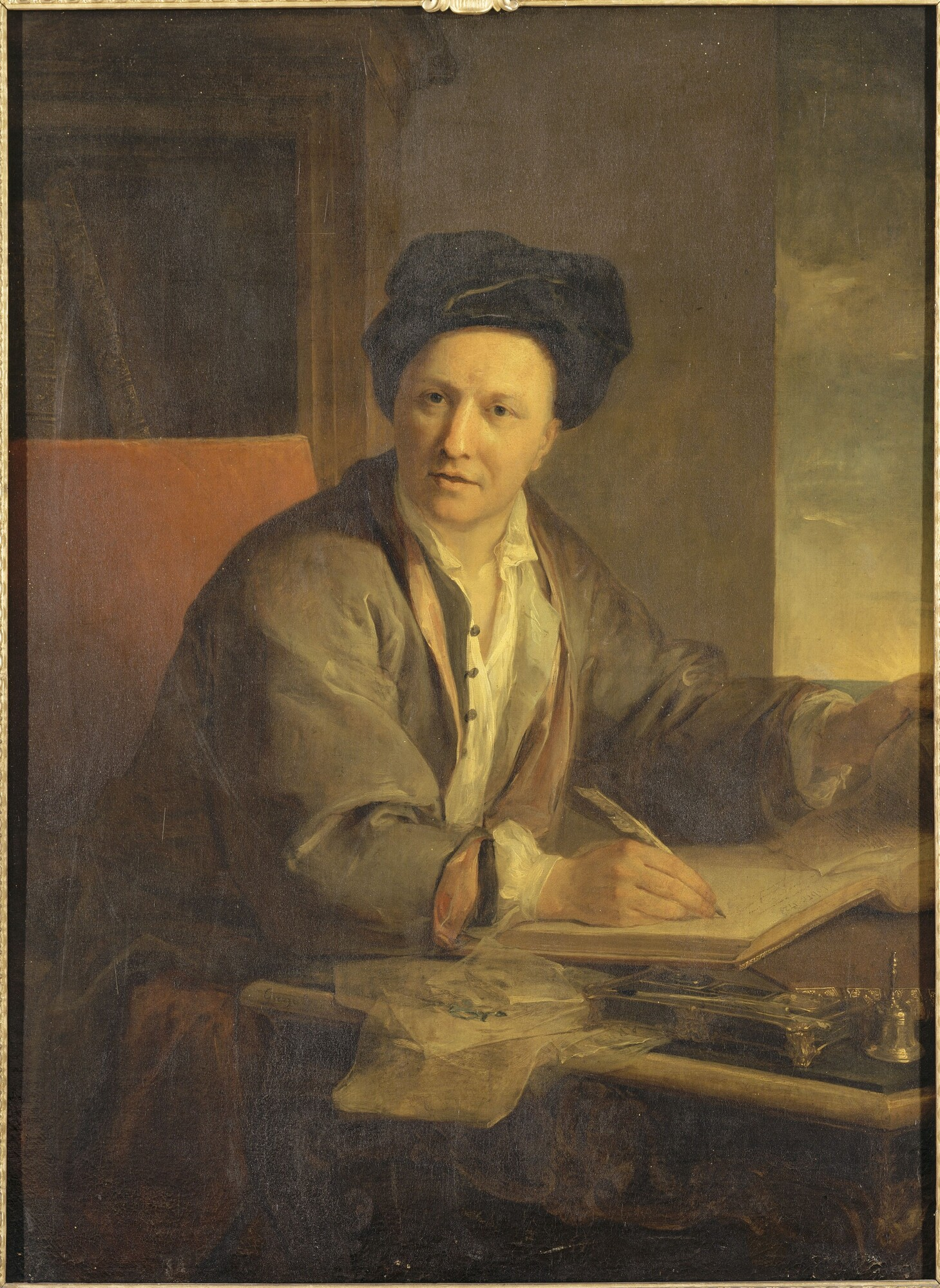
- A 1723 portrait of Fontenelle by Louis Galloche
- Born: 11 February 1657; Rouen, France
- Died: 9 January 1757 (aged 99); Paris, France
- Occupation: Essayist
- Relatives: Thomas Corneille and Pierre Corneille

Bernard Le Bovier de Fontenelle (/fɒntəˈnɛl/; French: [fɔ̃tənɛl]; 11 February 1657 – 9 January 1757), also called Bernard Le Bouyer de Fontenelle, was a French writer and a member of three of the academies of the Institut de France, noted especially for his accessible treatment of scientific topics during the unfolding of the Age of Enlightenment.

== Biography ==
Fontenelle was born in Rouen, France (then the capital of Normandy) and died in Paris at age 99. His mother was the sister of great French dramatists Pierre and Thomas Corneille. His father, François le Bovier de Fontenelle, was a lawyer who worked in the provincial court of Rouen and came from a family of lawyers from Alençon.

He trained in the law but gave up after one case, devoting his life to writing about philosophers and scientists, especially defending the Cartesian tradition. In spite of the undoubted merit and value of his writings, both to the laity and the scientific community, there is no question of his being a primary contributor to the field. He was a commentator and explicator and occasionally a passionate, though generally good-humoured, controversialist.

He was educated at the college of the Jesuits, the Lycée Pierre Corneille (although it did not adopt the name of his uncle (Pierre Corneille) until 1873, about 200 years later). At the Lycée he showed a preference for literature and distinguished himself.

According to Bernard de Fontenelle, François Blondel was a disciple of Father Marin Mersenne at the Academia Parisiensis in the French capital, until 1649. There he met "Messieurs Gassendi, Descartes, Hobbes, Roberval, and the two Pascals, father and son".

== Early work ==
He began as a poet, writing a poem in Latin at the age of 13 and more than once competed for prizes of the Académie Française, but he never won anything. He visited Paris from time to time and became friendly with the abbé de Saint-Pierre, the abbé Vertot and the mathematician Pierre Varignon. He witnessed, in 1680, the total failure of his tragedy Aspar. Fontenelle afterwards acknowledged the public verdict by burning his drama. His libretto for Pascal Collasse's Thétis et Pélée ("Thetis and Peleus"), which premiered at the Opéra de Paris in January 1689, was received with great acclaim.

His Lettres galantes du chevalier d'Her ..., published anonymously in 1685, was a collection of letters portraying worldly society of the time. It immediately made its mark. In 1686 his famous allegory of Rome and Geneva, slightly disguised as the rival princesses Mreo and Eenegu, in the Relation de l'île de Bornéo, gave proof of his daring in religious matters. Fontenelle's Nouveaux Dialogues des morts (1683) established a genuine claim to high literary rank.

Three years later, he wrote the most influential work to date on the plurality of worlds, Entretiens sur la pluralité des mondes (1686). He wrote extensively on the nature of the universe: "Behold a universe so immense that I am lost in it. I no longer know where I am. I am just nothing at all. Our world is terrifying in its insignificance."

== Later work ==
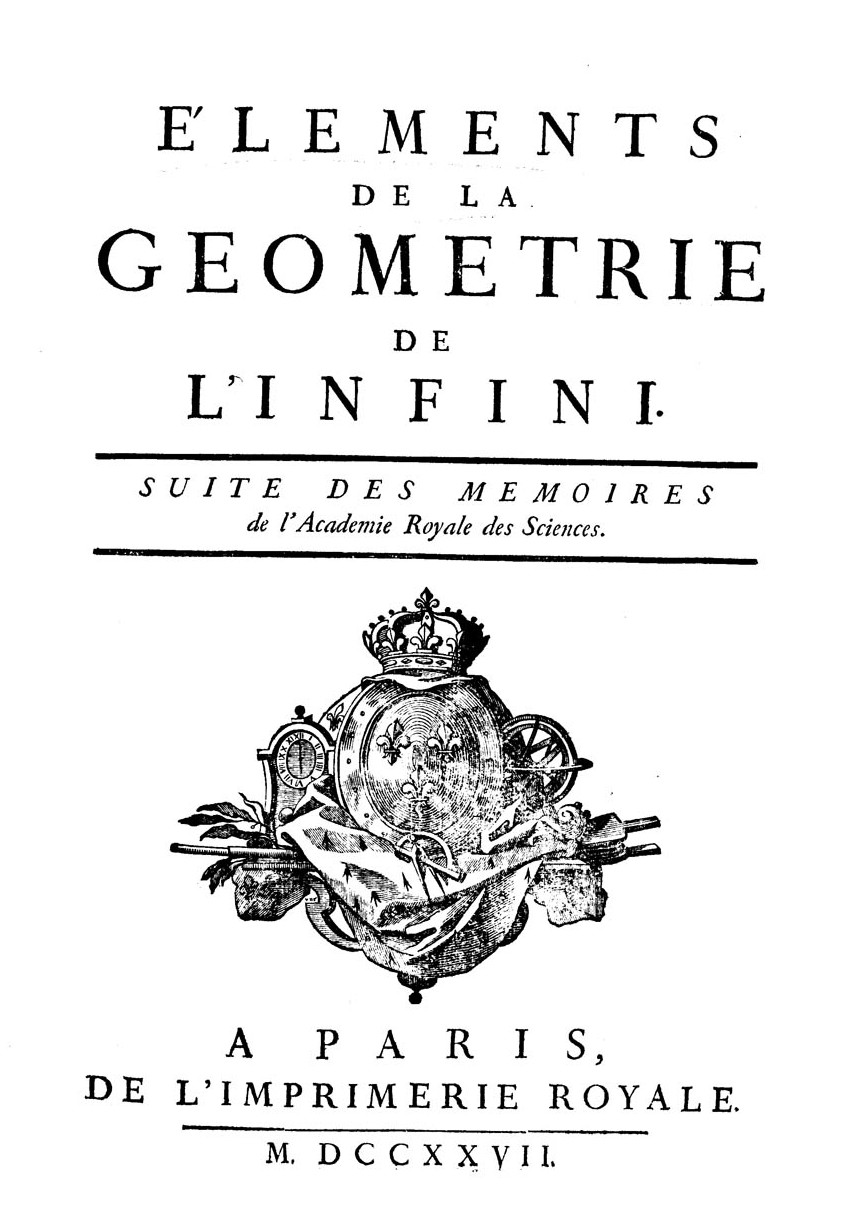
Éléments de la géométrie de l'infini, 1727

Fontenelle had made his home in Rouen. In 1687 he moved to Paris. In 1687 he published his Histoire des oracles, a book which made a considerable stir in theological and philosophical circles. It consisted of two essays, the first of which was designed to prove that oracles were not given by the supernatural agency of demons, and the second that they did not cease with the birth of Jesus.

It excited the suspicion of the Church, and a Jesuit, by name Jean-François Baltus, published a ponderous refutation of it; but the peace-loving disposition of its author impelled him to leave his opponent unanswered. To the following year (1688) belongs his Digression sur les anciens et les modernes, in which he took the modern side in the controversy then raging; his Doutes sur le système physique des causes occasionnelles (against Nicolas Malebranche) appeared shortly afterwards.

He remained influential in his older years and when a then unknown Jean-Jacques Rousseau met him in 1742, when Fontenelle was 85, he passed on the advice he gave all young writers that came to him: "You must courageously offer your brow to laurel wreaths and your nose to blows."

A noted gourmand, he attributed his longevity to eating strawberries. At ninety-two, one observer wrote that he was as lively as a man of twenty-two. When, in his late nineties, he met the then-beautiful Madame Helvétius, he reportedly told her, "Ah Madame, if only I were eighty again!"

== Member of the French Academy ==
In 1691 he was received into the French Academy in spite of the determined efforts of the partisans of the "ancients", especially Racine and Boileau, who on four previous occasions had ensured his rejection. He was thus a member both of the Academy of Inscriptions and of the Academy of Sciences. In 1697 he became perpetual secretary to the Academy of Sciences, an office he held for forty-two years. It was in this official capacity that he wrote the Histoire du renouvellement de l'Académie des Sciences (Paris, 3 vols., 1708, 1717, 1722) containing extracts and analyses of the proceedings, and also the éloges of the members, written with great simplicity and delicacy.

Perhaps the best known of his éloges, of which there are sixty-nine in all, is that of his uncle Pierre Corneille. This was first printed in the Nouvelles de la republique des lettres (January 1685) and, as Vie de Corneille, was included in all the editions of Fontenelle's Œuvres. The other important works of Fontenelle are his Éléments de la géometrie de l'infini (1727) and his Théorie des tourbillons (1752). In the latter he supported the views of René Descartes concerning gravitation, material that by that time had effectively been superseded by the work of Isaac Newton.

He is noted for the accessibility of his work – particularly its novelistic style. This allowed non-scientists to appreciate scientific development in a time where this was unusual, and scientists to benefit from the thoughts of the greater society. If his writing is often seen as trying to popularize the astronomical theories of Descartes, whose greatest exponent he is sometimes considered, it also appealed to the literate society of the day to become more involved in "natural philosophy," thus enriching the work of early-Enlightenment scientists. In spite of the inarguable value and quality of his writings, he had no serious pretensions to original scientific or mathematical work, but did not let that stop him from outspoken support for Descartes' proposed conceptions of the roles of vortices in physics.

== Legacy ==
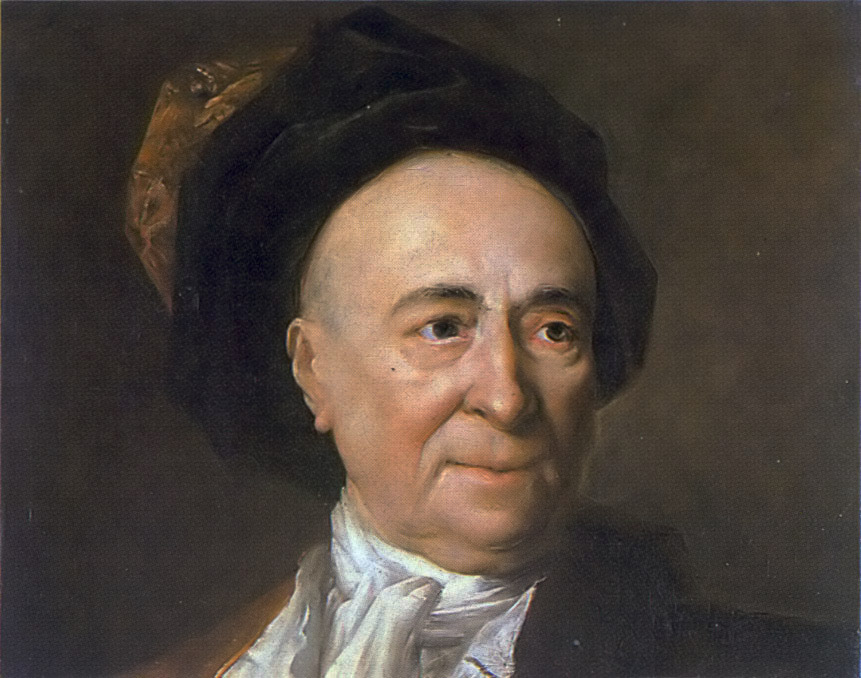
A portrait of Fontenelle by Nicolas de Largillière

Fontenelle was a popular figure in the educated French society of his period, by holding a position of esteem comparable only to that of Voltaire. Unlike Voltaire, however, Fontenelle avoided making important enemies. He balanced his penchant for universal critical thought with liberal doses of flattery and praise to the appropriate individuals in aristocratic society.

Fontenelle forms a link between two periods of French literature: the 17th century beaux esprits of Corneille, Racine and Boileau, and the 18th century philosophes of Voltaire, D'Alembert and Diderot.

According to Charles Augustin Sainte-Beuve, he deserves a place dans la classe des esprits infiniment distingués but is distinguished by being ought to be added by intelligence rather than by intellect and less by the power of saying much than by the power of saying a little well. There have been several collected editions of Fontenelle's works, the first being printed in 3 vols. at the Hague in 1728–1729. The best is that of Paris, in 8 vols., 1790. Some of his separate works have been frequently reprinted and also translated.

The Pluralité des mondes was translated into modern Greek in 1794. Sainte-Beuve has an interesting essay on Fontenelle, with several useful references, in the Causeries du lundi, vol. iii. See also Villemain, Tableau de la littérature française au XVIIIe siècle; the abbé Trublet, Mémoires pour servir à l'histoire de la vie et des ouvrages de M. de Fontenelle (1759); A Laborde-Milaà, Fontenelle (1905), in the "Grands écrivains français" series; and L. Maigron, Fontenelle, l'homme, l'œuvre, l'influence (Paris, 1906).

His Dialogues of the dead show both his erudition and wit by presenting invented but plausible dialogues between dead ancients, dead moderns and a whole book devoted to dialogues between an ancient and a modern. To Montaigne asking him if some centuries had more wise men than other, Socrates answers sadly, "The general order of natures seems very constant". In one of the books Roxelane and Anne Boleyn discuss about politics and the way for a woman to decide a man to marry her. The dialogue between Montezuma and Cortez allows the former to dismiss some myths about the wisdom in ancient Greece by quoting some counter-examples.

In 1935, the lunar crater Fontenelle was named after him, and so was the asteroid 10069 Fontenelle, which was discovered in 1989.

== Bibliography ==
- La Comète (1681)
- Nouveaux dialogues des morts (1683)
- De l'origine des fables (1684)
- Lettres galantes du chevalier d’Her*** (1685)
- Relation de l’île de Bornéo (1686)
- Entretiens sur la pluralité des mondes (1686; revised 1724)
- Histoire des oracles (1687)
- Digression sur les anciens et les modernes (1688)
- Le Comte de Gabalis, comédie en un acte (1689)
- Énée et Lavinie (1690)
- Idalie (circa 1710)
