= List of compositions by Maurice Ravel =

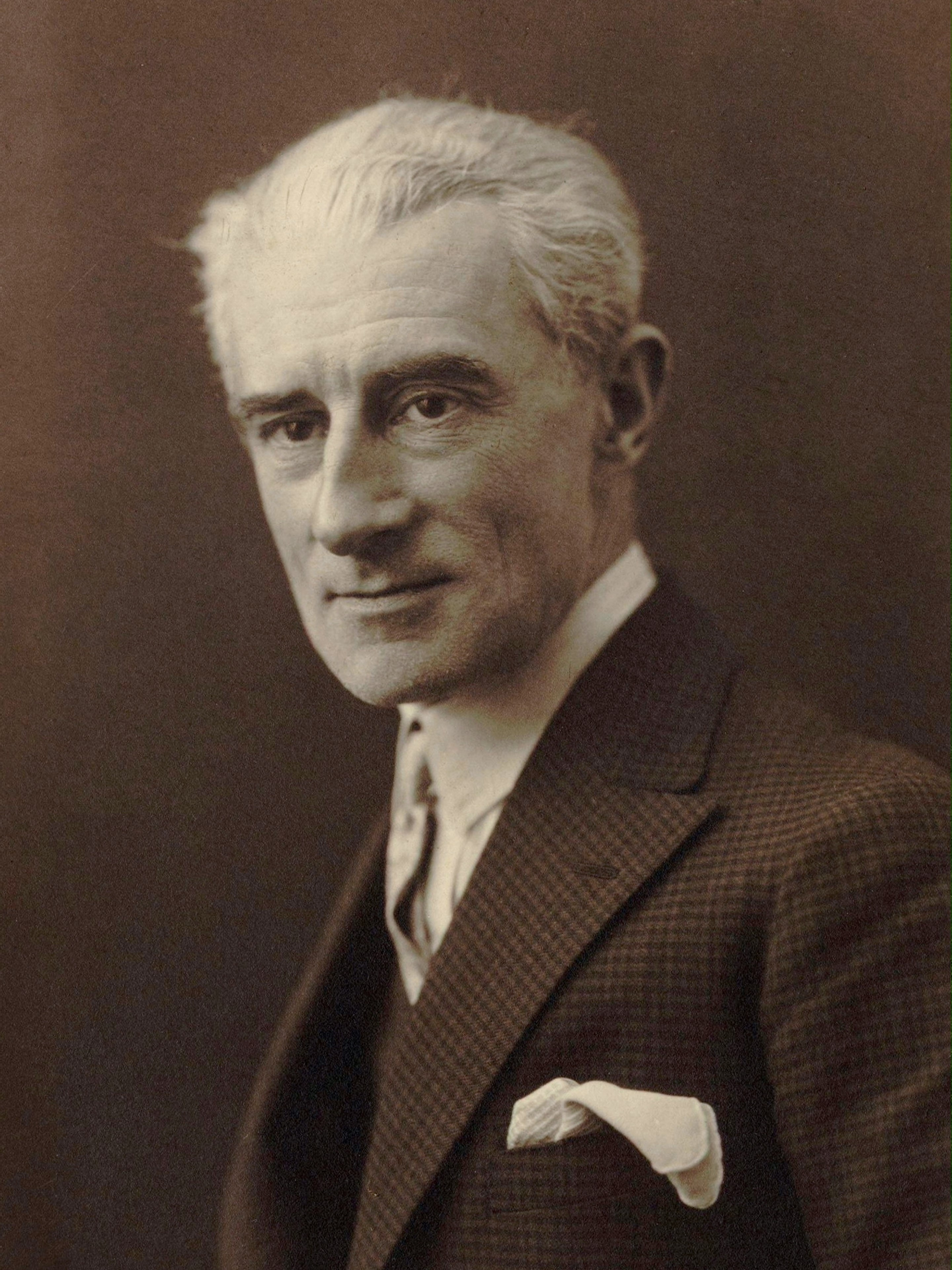
Ravel, ca. 1925

This is a complete list of compositions by Maurice Ravel, initially categorised by genre, and sorted within each genre chronologically in order of date the composition was completed. Catalogue "M" numbers were assigned by the musicologist Marcel Marnat according to date of composition. Arrangements by Ravel of his own works were assigned the "M" number of the original followed by a letter (a, b, c, etc.). Arrangements by Ravel of other composers' works or of "traditional" music were assigned a separate "MA" number, in order of date of arrangement.

== List of compositions ==
List of compositions
M.	Title	Scoring	Date	Notes
=== Orchestra ===
43a	Une Barque sur l'océan	Orchestra	1906	Orchestration of M. 43 No. 3; 1st version
54	Rapsodie espagnole: 1. Prélude à la nuit 2. Malagueña; 3. Habanera; 4. Feria	Orchestra	1907	
A15	Nikolai Rimsky-Korsakov: Antar	Orchestra	1909	Incidental music to a 5-act play by Chekri Ganem; partial reorchestration of most of the symphonic poem Antar Op. 9, the movements reordered and interspersed with reorchestrated fragments of the same work, a fragment of the opera Mlada, orchestrated fragments of songs from the Romances Op. 4 and Op. 7, and an extract from Félicien David's composition Le Désert, all included as the basis for new music by Ravel mostly in the style of Rimsky-Korsakov used as interconnecting pieces with the larger Antar movements; the orchestral score of the song fragments and David's piece are lost, though the song fragments exist in the piano reduction
19a	Pavane pour une infante défunte	Orchestra	1910	Orchestration of M. 19
57a	Daphnis et Chloé Suite No. 1: 1. Nocturne; 2. Interlude; 3. Danse guerrière	Orchestra	1911	Extracted and arranged from the ballet M. 57
60a	Ma mère l'Oye	Orchestra	1911	Orchestration of M. 60
A18	Erik Satie: Préludes pour Le Fils des étoiles	Piano	1910–11	originally for piano, new orchestration of No. 1; planned new orchestration of all 3 preludes, only first was completed
57b	Daphnis et Chloé Suite No. 2: 1. Lever du jour 2. Pantomime; 3. Danse générale	Orchestra	1913	Extracted and arranged from the ballet M. 57
A19	Modest Mussorgsky: Khovanshchina, opera	Orchestra	1913	Orchestration completed, some parts re-orchestrated and edited in collaboration with Igor Stravinsky from the score by Nikolai Rimsky-Korsakov.: portions of Act I and Act III survive at the Beinecke Rare Book and Manuscript Library
A20	Frédéric Chopin: Les Sylphides, ballet: 1. Prélude, Op. 28 No. 7; 2. Nocturne, Op. 32 No. 2; 3. Valse, Op. 70 No. 1; 4. Mazurka, Op. 33 No. 2; 5. Mazurka, Op. 67 No. 3; 6. Prélude, Op. 28 No. 7; 7. Valse, Op. 64 No. 2; 8. Grande valse brillante, Op. 18	Orchestra	1914	New orchestration of various piano pieces arranged as a ballet for Vaslav Nijinsky's new ballet company; partially lost; fragments exist at the Bibliothèque nationale de France
A21	Robert Schumann: Carnaval, ballet: 1. Préambule; 16. Valse Allemande and Intermezzo: Paganini; 20. Marche des Davidsbündler contre les Philistins	Orchestra	1914	New orchestration of the suite for piano Op. 9 for Nijinsky's new ballet company; project abandoned; only 3 of the 20 pieces survive, the remaining 17 are either lost or were never written
43c	Alborada del gracioso	Orchestra	1918	Orchestration of M. 43 No. 4
A23	Emmanuel Chabrier: Menuet pompeux	Orchestra	1917–18	No. 9 of Pièces pittoresques; originally for piano, orchestration for the Sergei Diaghilev ballet Les Jardins d'Aranjuez
68a	Le Tombeau de Couperin: 1. Prélude; 2. Forlane; 3. Menuet; 4. Rigaudon	Orchestra	1919	Orchestration of 4 pieces (reordered) from M. 68
A24	Modest Mussorgsky: Tableaux d'une exposition (Pictures at an Exhibition), suite	Orchestra	1922	Originally for piano, orchestration (omitting the last "Promenade")
A25	Claude Debussy: Sarabande	Orchestra	1922	No. 2 of Pour le piano, originally for piano, orchestration; published as No. 1 of Sarabande et Danse
A26	Claude Debussy: Danse (Tarantelle styrienne)	Orchestra	1922	Originally for piano, orchestration; published as No. 2 of Sarabande et Danse
43b	Une Barque sur l'océan	Orchestra	1926	Orchestration of M 43 No. 3; revised version; lost, possibly never written
7a	Menuet antique	Orchestra	1929	orchestration of M 7
=== Concertante ===
66	Zaspiak-Bat	Piano and orchestra	1913–14	Based on Basque themes; sketches only
76a	Tzigane, Rapsodie de concert	Violin and orchestra	1924	Orchestration of M 76
82	Concerto for the Left Hand (in D major)	Piano and orchestra	1929–30	
83	Concerto in G (major)	Piano and orchestra	1929–31	
=== Chamber ===
12	Sonate (No. 1): 1. Allegro	Violin and piano	1897	1st movement only; published posthumously
35	String Quartet in F major: 1. Allegro moderato, très doux 2. Assez vif, très rythmé 3. Très lent 4. Vif et agité	String quartet	1902–03	
46	Introduction et Allegro	Harp, flute, clarinet, and string quartet	1905	
67	Trio in A minor: 1. Modéré; 2. Pantoum. Assez vif 3. Passacaille. Très large 4. Final. Animé	Piano, violin, and cello	1914	
73a	Duo for Le Tombeau de Claude Debussy	Violin and cello	1920	No. 1 of the multi-composer collection; early version of Allegro (1st) movement of Sonate M 73
73	Sonate (in A minor): 1. Allegro; 2. Très vif 3. Lent; 4. Vif, avec entrain	Violin and cello	1920–22	
74	Berceuse sur le nom de Gabriel Fauré	Violin and piano	1922	
76b	Tzigane	Violin and piano with luthéal attachment	1922–24	Alternative original version of M 76
76	Tzigane	Violin and piano	1922–24	
77	Sonate (No. 2) in G major: 1. Allegretto; 2. Blues. Moderato (A♭ major); 3. Perpetuum mobile. Allegro	Violin and piano	1923–27	
=== Piano solo ===
A1	Camille Saint-Saëns: La jeunesse d'Hercule, symphonic poem, Op. 50	Piano	1887	Originally for orchestra, arrangement, study score
1	Piano Sonata: 1. Prélude	Piano	1888	1st movement only; student exercise; lost
2	Variations on a Theme of Grieg	Piano	1888	Theme: Death of Åse from Peer Gynt; student exercise; held in collection of Ravel's heirs
3	Variations on a Theme of Schumann	Piano	1888	Theme: chorale Freu dich sehr, o meine Seele from "Album for the Young", Op. 68; student exercise; held in collection of Ravel's heirs
5	Sérénade grotesque	Piano	1892–93	discovered and published posthumously
7	Menuet antique	Piano	1895	
11	La Parade, ballet	Piano	1896	piano sketch only, comprising 2 waltzes, 2 marches, and a mazurka; discovered and published posthumously
14	Valse in D major	Piano	1898	held in collection of Ravel's heirs
19	Pavane pour une infante défunte	Piano	1899	
20	Fugue	call	1899	Prix de Rome essay competition; lost
23	Fugue in D major	Piano	1900	
24	Fugue à quatre voix on a theme of Reber in F major	Piano	1900	possibly held by Yale
26	Prélude et Fugue	Piano	1900	student composition; lost
27	Fugue in F major	Piano	1901	Prix de Rome competition
30	Jeux d'eau	Piano	1901	
32	Fugue in E♭ major	Piano	1902	Prix de Rome competition
A3	Frederick Delius: Margot la Rouge, opera	Piano	1902	Reduction of orchestra part for piano
36	Fugue in E minor	Piano	1903	Prix de Rome competition; held at the Museum of the National Library of France
42	Menuet in C♯ minor	Piano	1904	
40	Sonatine: 1. Modéré; 2. Mouvement de menuet 3. Animé	Piano	1903–05	First movement written for a competition sponsored by a Parisian magazine
43	Miroirs: 1. Noctuelles; 2. Oiseaux tristes 3. Une Barque sur l'océan 4. Alborada del gracioso 5. La Vallée des cloches	Piano	1904–05	
44	Fugue in C major	Piano	1905	Prix de Rome competition
55	Gaspard de la nuit: 1. Ondine; 2. Le Gibet; 3. Scarbo	Piano	1908	Based on 3 poems by Aloysius Bertrand from Gaspard de la nuit
58	Menuet sur le nom d'Haydn	Piano	1909	
A15a	Nikolai Rimsky-Korsakov: Antar, incidental music	Piano	1909	Reduction for piano of M. A15
57d	Daphnis et Chloé, ballet	Piano	1910	original version for piano of M. 57
61	Valses nobles et sentimentales	Piano	1911	
57c	Danse gracieuse de Daphnis, suite: 1. Nocturne; 2. Interlude et Danse guerrière 3. Scène de Daphnis et Chloé	Piano	1913	Transcription from Daphnis et Chloé ballet M. 57
63	À la manière de...: Borodine, Valse; Chabrier	Piano	1912–13	The latter is a paraphrase on an aria from Charles Gounod's Faust
65	Prélude	Piano	1913	
68	Le Tombeau de Couperin: 1. Prélude; 2. Fugue; 3. Forlane; 4. Rigaudon; 5. Menuet; 6. Toccata	Piano	1914–17	
72b	La Valse	Piano	1920	Transcription of M. 72
80b	Fanfare for L'éventail de Jeanne, children's ballet	Piano	1927	Reduction for piano of M. 80
81a	Boléro	Piano	1929	Transcription of M. 81
=== Piano duet ===
8	Habanera	Two pianos	1895	Published as No. 1 of Sites auriculaires, with M. 13; used later as No. 3 of Rapsodie espagnole M. 54a
13	Entre cloches	Two pianos	1897	published as No. 2 of Sites auriculaires, with M. 8
17a	Shéhérazade	Piano four hands	1898	Original version of Overture M. 17
A2	Claude Debussy: Sirènes	Two pianos	1902	No. 3 of Nocturnes; originally for orchestra and female chorus, arrangement; first version
54a	Rapsodie espagnole: 1. Prélude à la nuit 2. Malagueña; 3. Habanera; 4. Feria	Two pianos	1907	Original version of M. 54; III. Habanera, identical to M 8
56	Pavane de la Belle au bois dormant	Piano four hands	1908	Inspired by Charles Perrault; used later as No. 1 of Ma mère l'Oye M. 60
A14	Claude Debussy: Trois nocturnes: 1. Nuages; 2. Fêtes; 3. Sirènes	Two pianos	1909	Originally for orchestra, arrangement; composed with Debussy's stepson and pupil Raoul Bardac; III. Sirènes, second version
60	Ma mère l'Oye ("Mother Goose"), children's pieces: 1. Pavane de la belle au bois dormant 2. Petit Poucet; 3. Laideronnette, impératrice des pagodes 4. Les Entretiens de la belle et de la bête 5. Le Jardin féerique	Piano four hands	1908–10	Inspired by the tales of Charles Perrault and Madame d'Aulnoy; I. Pavane, identical to M. 56
A16	Claude Debussy: Prélude à l'après-midi d'un faune	Piano four hands	1910	Originally for orchestra, transcription
70	Frontispice	Two pianos five hands	1918	For S.P. 503: Le Poème du Vardar by Ricciotto Canudo
72a	La Valse	Two pianos	1920	Transcription of M. 72
80a	Fanfare	Piano four hands	1927	Transcription of M. 80
81b	Boléro	Piano four hands	1929	Transcription of M. 81
82a	Concerto for the Left Hand	Two pianos	1930	Reduction of orchestra part of M. 82 for piano
83a	Concerto in G	Two pianos	1932	Reduction of orchestra part of M. 83 for second piano
=== Stage ===
17	Shéhérazade, Ouverture de féerie	Orchestra	1898	Originally intended as an opera, after "One Thousand and One Nights"; abandoned, only Ouverture completed and premiered separately as a concert piece
18	Olympia	Opera	1898–99	After E. T. A. Hoffmann's Der Sandmann ("The Sandman"); sketches destroyed except for a Symphonie horlogère incorporated into the opening of L'heure espagnole M. 52
52	L'Heure espagnole ("The Spanish Hour")	Opera	1907–11	Libretto: Franc-Nohain
49	La Cloche engloutie ("The Sunken Bell")	Opera	1906–12	After Gerhart Hauptmann's Die versunkene Glocke; planned work, survives as sketches
57	Daphnis et Chloé	Ballet	1909–12	
61a	Adélaïde ou le langage des fleurs (Adelaide, or The Language of Flowers)	Ballet	1912	Orchestration of Valses nobles et sentimentales M. 61
62	Ma Mère l'Oye ("Mother Goose"): 1. Prélude. Très lent 2. Premier tableau. Danse du rouet et scène 3. Deuxième tableau. Pavane de la belle au bois dormant 4. Interlude; 5. Troisième tableau. Les Entretiens de la belle et de la bête 6. Interlude; 7. Quatrième tableau. Petit Poucet; 8. Interlude; 9. Cinquième tableau. Laideronnette, impératrice des Pagodes; 10. Interlude; 11. Sixième tableau. Apothéose. Le Jardin féerique	Ballet	1911–12	Orchestral version (M. 60a) with new music added (2 new opening pieces plus 4 new interludes); III. identical to M. 60a I; V. identical to M. 60a IV; VII. identical to M. 60a II; IX. identical to M. 60a III; XI. identical to M. 60a V
72	La Valse, Poème chorégraphique	Ballet	1919–20	sketches 1906
71	L'Enfant et les sortilèges, Fantaisie lyrique ("The Child and the Spells"), operetta-ballet	8 solo voices, mixed choir, children's choir, and orchestra with piano luthéal	1917–25	Libretto by Colette
80	Fanfare for L'éventail de Jeanne, children's ballet	Ballet with small orchestra	1927	No. 1 (Prélude) of the collective composition (by 10 French composers)
81	Boléro	Ballet	1928	
85	Morgiane, oratorio-ballet	Vocal soloists, choir, and orchestra	1932	Libretto after "One Thousand and One Nights"; sketches only
84	Don Quichotte à Dulcinée, song cycle: 1. Chanson romanesque 2. Chanson épique 3. Chanson à boire	Baritone and orchestra	1933	Text: Paul Morand, originally intended as film music for G. W. Pabst's 1933 film Don Quixote but Ravel's music was not used; unfinished, originally projected as 4 songs plus incidental music, but only 3 songs completed
86	Jeanne d'Arc ("Joan of Arc")	Grand opera	1930s	After Joseph Delteil's Jeanne d'Arc, planned for the Paris Opéra; unrealised project
=== Choral ===
22	Callirhoé	Soprano, tenor, and orchestra	1900	Text: Eugène Adenis; Prix de Rome essay competition; partially lost
25	Les bayadères	Soprano, mixed choir, and orchestra	1900	Text: Henri Cazalis; Prix de Rome competition
28	Tout est lumière	Soprano, mixed choir, and orchestra	1901	Text: Victor Hugo; Prix de Rome competition
29	Myrrha, cantata	Soprano, tenor, baritone, and orchestra	1901	Text: Fernand Beissier; Prix de Rome competition
31	Sémiramis	Tenor and orchestra	1902	Text: Eugène Adenis; student competition; partially lost
33	La Nuit	Soprano, mixed choir, and orchestra	1902	Text: anonymous (Eugène Adenis?); Prix de Rome competition
34	Alcyone	Soprano, alto, tenor, and orchestra	1902	Text: Eugène and Edouard Adenis; Prix de Rome competition
37	Matinée de Provence	Soprano, mixed choir, and orchestra	1903	Text: Jean Renouard; Prix de Rome competition
38	Alyssa, cantata	Soprano, tenor, baritone, and orchestra	1903	Text by Marguerite Coiffier; Prix de Rome competition
45	L'Aurore	Tenor, mixed choir, and orchestra	1905	Text: Édouard Guinand; Prix de Rome competition
59	Saint François d'Assise	Soloists, choir, and orchestra	1909–10	lost
69	Trois chansons: 1. Nicolette; 2. Trois beaux oiseaux du paradis 3. Ronde	Mixed choir	1914–15	Text: Ravel
=== Solo voice with orchestra ===
39a	Manteau des fleurs	Voice and orchestra	1903?	Orchestration of M. 39
41	Shéhérazade, poems: 1. Asie; 2. La Flûte enchantée 3. L'Indifférent	Soprano/tenor and orchestra	1903	Text: Tristan Klingsor
47a	Noël des jouets	Voice and orchestra	1906	Orchestration of M. 47; 1st version
47b	Noël des jouets	Voice and orchestra	1913	Orchestration of M. 47; revised version
64	Trois poèmes de Stéphane Mallarmé, song cycle: 1. Soupir; 2. Placet futile 3. Surgi de la croupe et du bond	Medium voice, 2 flutes (2nd doubles piccolo), 2 clarinets (2nd doubles bass clarinet), string quartet, and piano	1913	Text: Stéphane Mallarmé
78	Chansons madécasses ("Madagascan Songs"), song cycle: 1. Nahandove; 2. Aoua; 3. Il est doux	Soprano, flute, cello, and piano	1925–26	Text: Evariste-Désiré Parny de Forges
75a	Ronsard à son âme	Voice and orchestra	1935	Orchestration of M. 75
=== Solo voice with piano ===
4	Ballade de la reine morte d'aimer, song	Voice and piano	1893	Text: Roland de Marès
6	Un grand sommeil noir, song	Deep voice and piano	1895	Text: Paul Verlaine
9	Sainte, song	Voice and piano	1896	Text: Stéphane Mallarmé
10	D'Anne jouant l'espinette, song	Voice and harpsichord/piano	1896	Text: Clément Marot
15	Chanson du rouet, song	Voice and piano	1898	Text: Leconte de Lisle
16	Si Morne!, song	Voice and piano	1898	Text: Émile Verhaeren
21	D'Anne qui me jecta de la neige, song	Voice and piano	1899	Text: Clément Marot
39	Manteau des fleurs, song	Voice and piano	1903	Text by Paul Gravollet
A4	Quel galant m'est comparable, song	Voice and piano	1904	Text: Greek traditional, in French translation by Michel-Dimitri Calvocoressi; published as No. 3 of Cinq mélodies populaires grecques ("Five Greek Folk Songs")
A5	Chanson des cueilleuses de lentisques, song	Voice and piano	1904	Text: Greek traditional, in French translation by Michel-Dimitri Calvocoressi; published as No. 4 of Cinq mélodies populaires grecques ("Five Greek Folk Songs")
A6	À vous, oiseaux des plaines, song	Voice and piano	1904	Text: Greek traditional, in French translation by Michel-Dimitri Calvocoressi; lost; written, but never submitted
A7	Chanson du pâtre épirote, song	Voice and piano	1904	Text: Greek traditional, in French translation by Michel-Dimitri Calvocoressi; lost; written, but never submitted
A8	Mon mouchoir, hélas, est perdu, song	Voice and piano	1904	Text: Greek traditional, in French translation by Michel-Dimitri Calvocoressi; lost; written, but never submitted
47	Noël des jouets ("The Toys' Christmas"), song	Voice and piano	1905	Text: Ravel
48	Les grands Vents venus d'outre-mer, song	Voice and piano	1906	Text: Henri de Régnier
50	Histoires naturelles ("Natural Histories"), song cycle: 1. Le Paon; 2. Le Grillon; 3. Le Cygne; 4. Le Martin-pêcheur; 5. La Pintade	Medium voice and piano	1906	Text: Jules Renard
A9	Chanson de la mariée, song	Voice and piano	1905–06	Text: Greek traditional, in French translation by Michel-Dimitri Calvocoressi; published as No. 1 of Cinq mélodies populaires grecques ("Five Greek Folk Songs")
A10	Là-bas, vers l'église, song	Voice and piano	1905–06	Text: Greek traditional, in French translation by Michel-Dimitri Calvocoressi; published as No. 2 of Cinq mélodies populaires grecques ("Five Greek Folk Songs")
A11	Tout gai!, song	Voice and piano	1905–06	Text: Greek traditional, in French translation by Michel-Dimitri Calvocoressi; published as No. 5 of Cinq mélodies populaires grecques ("Five Greek Folk Songs")
51	Vocalise-étude en forme de habanera, song	Deep voice and piano	1907	
53	Sur l'herbe, song	Voice and piano	1907	Text: Paul Verlaine
A12	Chanson écossaise: Ye banks and braes o' bonnie Doon ("Scottish Song"), song	Voice and piano	1909	Text: Robert Burns, in Scottish English: reconstructed from a sketch
A13	Tripatos: Kherya pou dhen idhen ilyos, song	Voice and piano	1909	Text: Greek traditional, in Greek; with French translation by Michel-Dimitri Calvocoressi
A17	Chants populaires ("Folk Songs"), songs: 1. Chanson espagnole: Adios men homino ("Spanish Song"); 2. Chanson française: Janeta ount anirem gardar ("French Song"); 3. Chanson italienne: M'affaccio la finestra ("Italian Song"); 4. Chanson hébraïque: Mejerke, main Suhn ("Hebrew Song")	Medium voice and piano	1910	1. Text: Spanish traditional, in Galician; 2. Text: French traditional, in Limousin; 3. Text: Italian traditional, in Italian; 4. Text: Hebrew traditional, in Yiddish and Hebrew
64a	Trois poèmes de Stéphane Mallarmé, song cycle	Voice and piano	1913	Transcription of M. 64
A22	Deux mélodies hébraïques ("Two Hebrew Songs"), songs: 1. Kaddich: Yithgaddal weyithkaddash 2. L'énigme éternelle: Fragt die Velt die alte Casche	Voice and piano	1914	1. Text: Hebrew traditional, in Aramaic; 2. Text: Hebrew traditional, in Yiddish
69a	Trois chansons	Medium voice and piano	1915	Arrangement of M. 69
75	Ronsard à son âme, song	Voice and piano	1923–24	Text: Pierre de Ronsard: part of the Tombeau de Ronsard collaborative project
79	Rêves, song	Voice and piano	1927	Text: Léon-Paul Fargue
84a	Don Quichotte à Dulcinée, song cycle	Baritone and piano	1932–33	Original version of M. 84

=== Uncatalogued Works ===
Ravel left many works incomplete or unpublished at the time of his death. Many of these works remain in the collection of Ravel's heirs. These do not include numerous fugues Ravel wrote, many of which were written during his time in the Conservatoire de Paris. Below are a few significant unpublished works.

Title	Scoring	Date	Notes
Le ciel est, par-dessus le toit	Voice and piano	1892	Text: Paul Verlaine
Intérieur	Piano	1890s	After Maurice Maeterlinck's Interior
François Couperin: Forlane	Piano	between 1914-1917	Originally for chamber group, transcription: Quatrième concert, VII. Forlane
Portrait de l'Infante/L'infante Rose	Piano	1923	After Henry Malherbe. In a private collection, consists of Pavane pour une infante défunte, Alborada del gracioso, and Rapsodie espagnole and additional measures composed by Ravel
Isaac Albéniz: Rondeña	Orchestra	1928	Originally for piano, transcription: Book 2, I. Rondeña
Farfadets	Piano		
Mazurka			
Barcarolle			
La nonne maudite	Piano		
Sur l'eau	Voice and orchestra		
Les Patineuses	Voice and piano		
Symphony			
Suite	Two pianos		First piano part is lost
Ludwig van Beethoven: Coriolan Overture	Piano		Originally for orchestra, transcription
