= Op. 99 =

In music, Op. 99 stands for Opus number 99. Compositions that are assigned this number include:

- Brahms – Cello Sonata No. 2
- Dvořák – Biblical Songs
- Schumann – Bunte Blätter
