= Hélène Jourdan-Morhange =

French violinist (1888–1961)

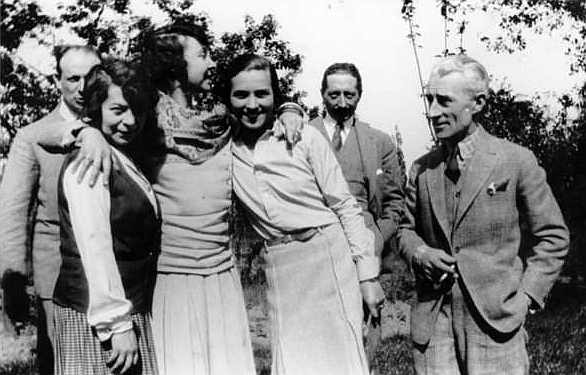
Left to right: Luc-Albert Moreau, Jourdan-Morhange, Madeleine Grey, Germaine Malançon, and Maurice Ravel (1925)

Hélène Jourdan-Morhange (née Morhange; 30 January 1888 – 15 May 1961) was a French classical violinist, music critic, and radio music producer.

== Biography ==
She was born Hélène Morhange in the 10th arrondissement of Paris on 30 January 1888.

Morhange married the French painter Jacques Jean Raoul Jourdan (born 22 June 1880 in Paris), who died at the Battle of Verdun 25 March 1916.

An interpreter inspired by the works of her contemporaries, she was noticed as early as 1917 by Maurice Ravel, of whom she became a friend and favourite interpreter. In 1927, Ravel dedicated to her his Violin Sonata No. 2 and ensured the premiere of the Sonata for Violin and Cello in 1922.

She was the companion of the painter and engraver Luc-Albert Moreau, whom she presented to Ravel.

With arthritis in her hands, she had to end her career early.
