= Kinderszenen =

Composition for piano by Robert Schumann

- Cycle by Robert Schumann
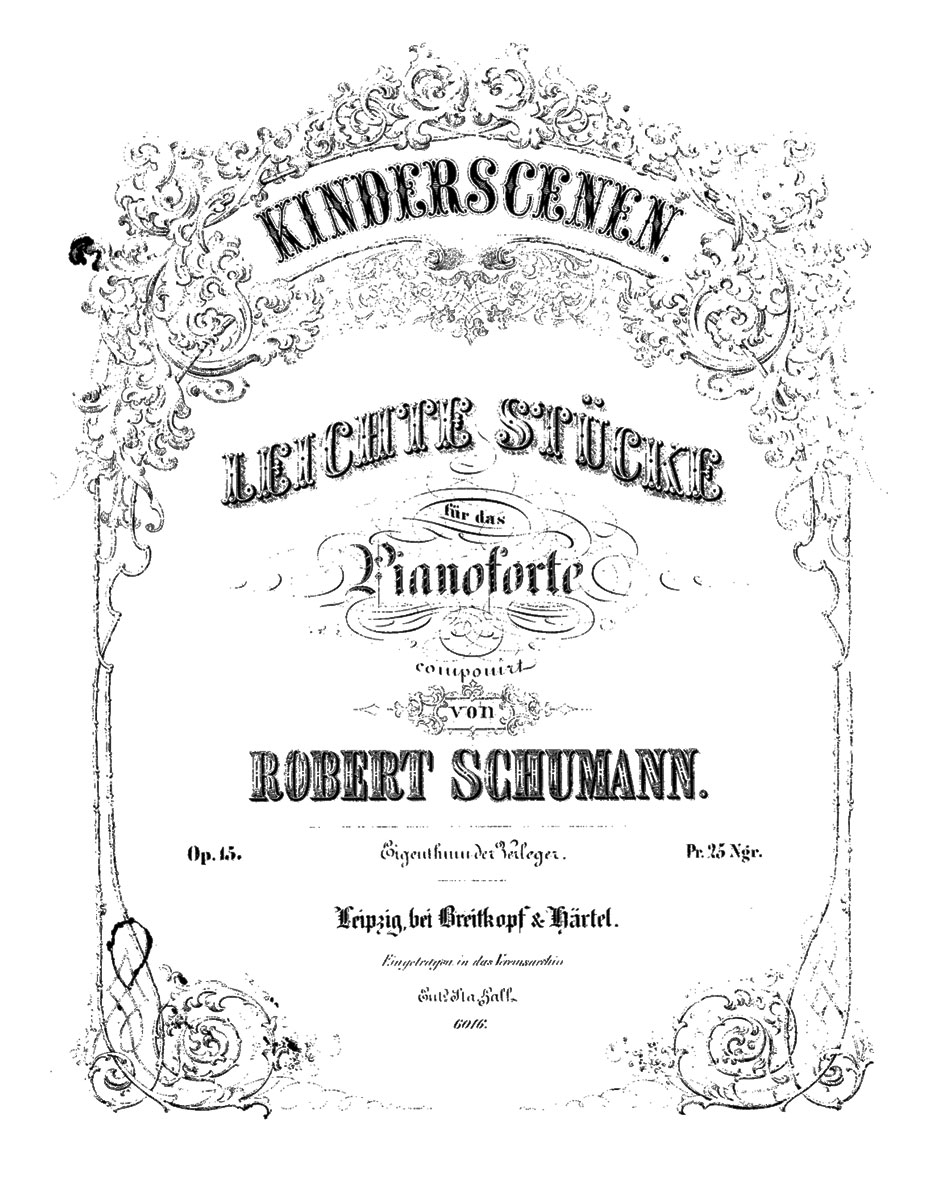
- First edition title page
- English: Scenes from Childhood
- Other name: Leichte Stücke
- Opus: 15
- Composed: 1838
- Movements: 13 pieces
- Scoring: Solo piano

Kinderszenen (Note: Original spelling: Kinderscenen) (German pronunciation: [ˈkʰɪndɐˌst͡seːnən], "Scenes from Childhood"), Op. 15, by Robert Schumann, is a set of thirteen pieces of music for piano written in 1838.

== History and description ==
Schumann wrote 30 movements for this work but chose 13 for the final version. The unused movements were later published in Bunte Blätter, Op. 99, and Albumblätter, Op. 124. Schumann initially intended to publish Kinderszenen together with Novelletten (Opus 21); the shared literary theme is suggested by the original title Kindergeschichten (Children's Tales). He told his wife Clara that the "thirty small, droll things", most of them less than a page in length, were inspired by her comment that he sometimes seemed "like a child". He described them in 1840 as "more cheerful, gentler, more melodic" than his earlier works.

Movement No. 7 of the work, Träumerei, is one of Schumann's best known pieces; it is the opening and closing musical theme of the 1947 Hollywood film Song of Love, and Träumerei is the title of a 1944 German biographical film on Schumann. In Russia, a hummed choral a cappella version became known as mourning music, being played annually during the Minute of Silence on Victory Day. The Indian apparel brand, Raymond, used Träumerei as the theme music in its advertising campaign, "The Complete Man".

Originally called Leichte Stücke ("Easy Pieces"), the section titles were only added after the completion of the composition, and Schumann described them as "nothing more than delicate hints for execution and interpretation". Timothy D. Taylor, however, has discussed the choice of titles for this work in the context of the changing situation of music culturally and economically, stating that the final movement, entitled Der Dichter spricht (The Poet Speaks), marked a realisation among composers that, due to the decline of patronage structures in the 19th century, their musical works must take on new meanings.

There is no known complete manuscript of Kinderszenen.

== Pieces ==
Title	Key	Play
1. Von fremden Ländern und Menschen; Of Foreign Lands and Peoples	G major	
2. Kuriose Geschichte; A Curious Story (Note: Original spelling: Curiose Geschichte)	D major	
3. Hasche-Mann; Blind Man's Buff	B minor	
4. Bittendes Kind; Pleading Child	D major	
5. Glückes genug Happy Enough	D major	
6. Wichtige Begebenheit; An Important Event	A major	
7. Träumerei; Dreaming	F major	
8. Am Kamin; At the Fireside (Note: Original spelling: Am Camin)	F major	
9. Ritter vom Steckenpferd; Knight of the Hobbyhorse	C major	
10. Fast zu ernst Almost Too Serious	G♯ minor	
11. Fürchtenmachen; Frightening	E minor – G major	
12. Kind im Einschlummern; Child Falling Asleep	E minor – E major	
13. Der Dichter spricht The Poet Speaks	G major	

== Discography ==
Year	Pianist	Piano	Label
1979	Jörg Demus	Conrad Graf (c. 1835)	SKC
1982	Richard Burnett	Conrad Graf (1841)	FSM
2007	Andreas Staier	Erard (1837)	Harmonia Mundi
2007	Piet Kuijken	Streicher (1850)	Fuga Libera
2009	Piet Kuijken	Streicher (1850)	Fuga Libera
2010	Jan Vermeulen	Johann Nepomuk Tröndlin (1830–1835)	Accent
2011	Eric Zivian	Franz Rausch (1841)	Avie Records
2014	Penelope Crawford	Conrad Graf (1835)	Musica Omnia
2018	Yuan Sheng	Streicher (1846)	Piano Classics
