= Sonata for Violin and Cello (Ravel) =

Composition by Maurice Ravel

- by Maurice Ravel
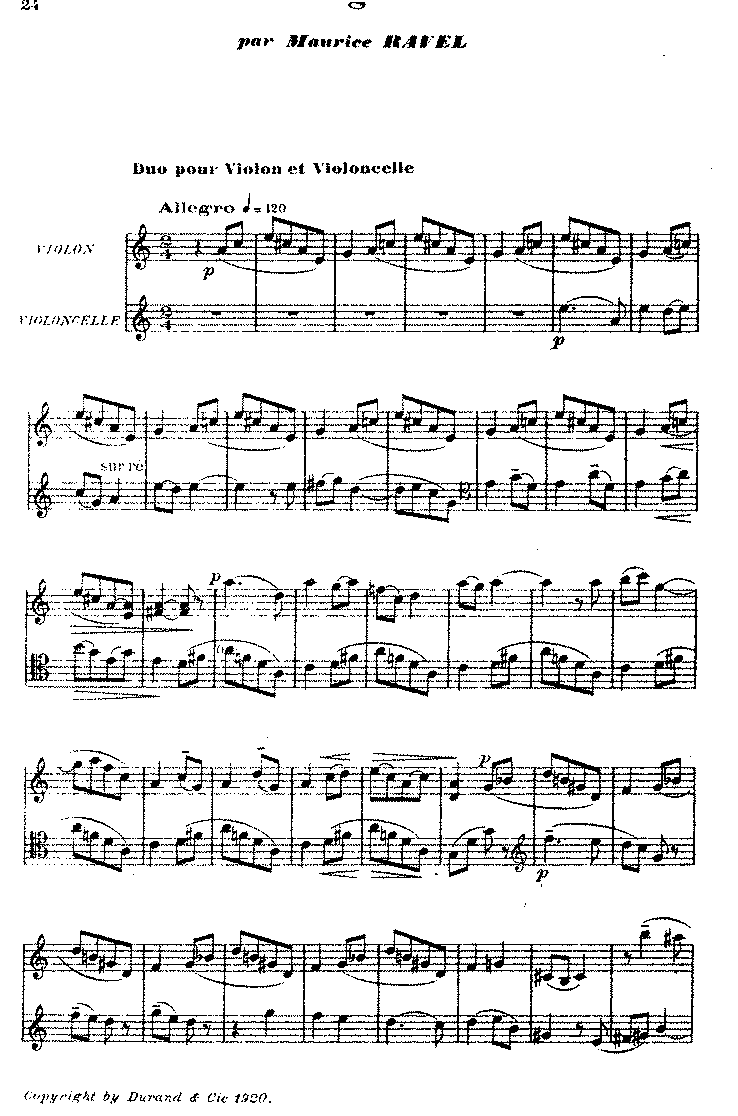
- First page of Sonata
- Native name: Sonate pour violon et violoncelle
- Key: A minor
- Catalogue: M. 73
- Composed: 1920-1922
- Dedication: Claude Debussy
- Published: 6 April 1922
- Scoring: violin; cello

The Sonata for Violin and Cello (French: Sonate pour violon et violoncelle) is a composition written by Maurice Ravel from 1920 to 1922. He dedicated it to Claude Debussy, who had died in 1918. It premiered on 6 April 1922 with Hélène Jourdan-Morhange playing the violin and Maurice Maréchal the cello. It is in the key of A minor, with the fourth movement in the relative major key of C. It is M. 73 in the catalogue compiled by Marcel Marnat.

== Structure ==
The work consists of four movements:

1. Allegro
2. Très vif
3. Lent
4. Vif, avec entrain
