= Trois Chansons (Ravel) =

Choral composition by Maurice Ravel

- Choral music by Maurice Ravel
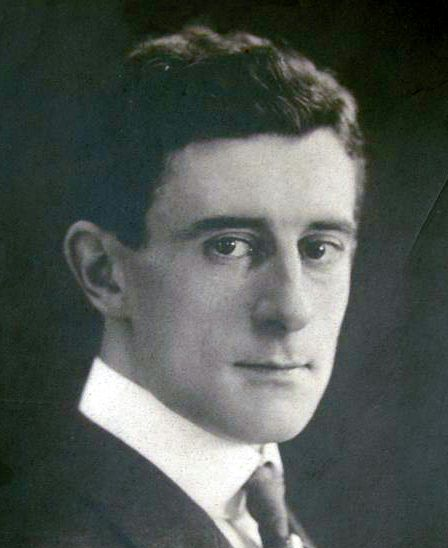
- The composer in 1913
- English: Three songs
- Catalogue: M 69
- Text: poems by Ravel
- Composed: 1914–15
- Dedication: Tristan Klingsor; Paul Painlevé; Sophie Clemenceau
- Performed: 11 October 1917
- Published: 1916
- Scoring: a cappella choir

Trois Chansons, M 69, is a composition by Maurice Ravel for a cappella choir, set to his own texts. Ravel began the composition in December 1914 in response to the outbreak of World War I, in which he hoped to be enlisted to fight for France. While he waited for months, he wrote text and music of the three songs in the tradition of 16th-century French chansons. He completed the work in 1915, and it was published by Éditions Durand in 1916. The songs were premiered in 1917, performed by a choral ensemble conducted by Louis Aubert. They remained his only composition for a cappella choir.

== History ==
Ravel composed the Trois Chansons in response to World War I, beginning the work in December 1914, when he was in Paris waiting to be drafted. He was determined to fight for his country. In November, he took daily driving lessons, aiming to join a supply department, and passed the test in December. He then began to write the first of three songs, which was published as the central one, adding the other two by February 1915. He wrote in a letter to a friend, Cipa Godebski:

Since the day before yesterday this sounding of alarms, these weeping women, and, above all, this terrible enthusiasm of the young people and of all the friends who have had to go and of whom I have no news. I cannot bear it any longer. The nightmare is too horrible. I think that at any moment I shall go mad or lose my mind. I have never worked so hard, with such insane, heroic rage… Just think… of the horror of this conflict. It never stops for an instant. What good will it all do?

Ravel reacted to the war with texts and music reminiscent of traditional French chansons of the 16th century. He wrote the texts himself in the spirit of popular rhymes. He dedicated the three songs to three people who might help him with the enlisting, "Nicolette" to Tristan Klingsor, who was connected to the military, "Trois beaux oiseaux du Paradis" to Paul Painlevé, a mathematician and socialist politician who was to become minister of war in 1917, and "Ronde" to Sophie Clemenceau, née Szepz, the wife of Paul Clemenceau.

It took eight months until Ravel was enlisted in March 1915, with help from Painlevé. The Chansons were published by Éditions Durand in 1916, and were premiered on 11 October 1917, performed by a choral ensemble assembled by Jane Bathori, conducted by Louis Aubert, at Théâtre du Vieux-Colombier. The work is catalogued as No. 69 in the list of compositions by Maurice Ravel established by musicologist Marcel Marnat. The Chansons are Ravel's only composition for a cappella choir. Ravel made an arrangement, M 69a, for medium voice and piano.

== Texts and music ==
A common theme in all three songs is loss, handled not without humour and irony. In "Nicolette", a young girl picking flowers on a meadow escapes a wolf and a page, but loses her innocence to an older gentleman offering silver. In "Trois beaux oiseaux du Paradis" (Three beautiful birds of Paradise), a girl whose beloved is in the war understands from the gifts of blue, white and red birds (the national colours of France) that he died. In "Ronde", young people lose respect for the warnings of the older men and women.

The texts recall the atmosphere of Renaissance music, and are supported by equally archaic music with plagal cadences and ancient turns of phrasing, with the music closely following the words. The music alludes to Renaissance chanson and madrigal.

=== Nicolette ===
The first song is set in A minor. The theme is followed by three variations – that of the wolf, that of the page, graceful and aerial, and that of the rich Barbon. In the three verses, the motif is presented alternately by all voices, the tempo varying from one verse to another, both bouncing and fearful. By combining the same melody with different accompaniment, Ravel achieves a form which is both strophic and theme with variations.

=== Trois beaux oiseaux du Paradis ===
The second song (Three beautiful birds of Paradise) is set in F minor. The song is the only one of the three clearly referring to the war, the colours of the birds being the colours of the flag of France, and the refrain "Mon ami, z'il est à la guerre". The first verses are presented by the "heavenly" voice of the soprano, continued by the tenor. The song was described as "of the three pieces, the most refined, undoubtedly" and as an "exquisite ballad full of tenderness".

Ravel gave it a form of a free rondo, in a form described as ABABA.A, while the traditional form might be ABACA, deviating from it by no contrasting C section but a repeat of A as a coda. The theme of longing is expressed by a languid melody with sparse accompaniment, in modal harmonies.

=== Ronde ===
The third song is in A major, with a Lydian D-sharp. The text is full of word-play in the tradition of 16th-century chansons, and has been described as "a virtuosic display of tongue-twisting verbal dexterity", and compared to that of Stephen Sondheim's Into the Woods. "In his display of erudite demonic science, Ravel has mixed all traditions: ancient, medieval and even oriental" and the polyphony is becoming more and more virtuosic. This song shows features of Basque folk music. The form is strictly strophic, with three contrasting sections in each stanza.

== Reception and legacy ==
The chansons were reviewed immediately and favourably. Later, Henri Collet wrote, "on these three dissimilar songs, Maurice Ravel composed an adorable musical triptych in which he shows himself the progressive continuator of Janequin and Costeley. "Nicolette" is the first time "allegro moderato"; the "Three beautiful birds of Paradise" constitute the moving andante, and the Ronde forms a dazzling finale of verve."

At the composer's death, the work was counted among those of maturity, revealing "an art that was more and more master of its means".

== Recordings ==
- Ensemble Vocal Philippe Caillard with works by Debussy, Poulenc, Milhaud, Florent Schmitt, Hindemith – LP Erato Records, 1964.
- Rundfunkchor Stockholm conducted by Eric Ericson with works by Debussy, Poulenc, Badings – LP EMI, 1971.
- Modern Madrigal Singers – Les Chansons De Poulenc – Milhaud – Debussy – Ravel, LP Desto DC-6483.
- Cambridge Singers conducted by John Rutter, with works by Britten, Debussy and Poulenc – Hyperion Records CSCD509.
- Accentus choir conducted by Laurence Equilbey, Chœurs profanes with works by Poulenc – CD Disques Pierre Verany PV794042, 1994, Grand prix de l'académie du disque lyrique.
- Kammerkoret Con Spirito, Helge Birkeland – Franske Stemninger, avec œuvres de Josquin des Prés, Janequin, Debussy, Poulenc, Milhaud, Messiaen, Schmitt – CD Bergen Digital Studio – BD7024CD, 1994.
- BBC Singers directed by Simon Joly, with works by Bach, Orlando di Lasso, Mendelssohn, Delius – CD BBC Music Magazine, BBC MM125, 1994
- Maurice Ravel, Chansons with Inva Mula, Valérie Millot, Claire Brua, Gérard Theruel, Laurent Naouri with Histoires naturelles, Chansons madécasses etc. – 2 CDs Naxos Records 8.554176-77, 2003.
- SWR Vokalensemble conducted by Rupert Huber, Musique chorale française with works by Debussy, Messiaen, Jolivet, Chausson – CD Hänssler Classic, 93.055, 2003.
- EuropaChorAkademie, Musique Chorale Française, with works by Absil, Poulenc, Debussy, Hindemith – CD Capriccio C67151, 2006.
- Ensemble Arsys Bourgogne conducted by Mihály Zeke, Naissance de Vénus with works by Debussy, Poulenc, Messiaen – CD Paraty, 2018.

== Cited sources ==
=== Monographs ===
- Ackere, Jules Van (1957). Maurice Ravel (in Dutch). Brussels: Elsevier. p. 216.
- Jankélévitch, Vladimir (1956). Ravel. Solfèges (in French). Paris: Éditions du Seuil. ISBN 2-02-023490-4.
- Marnat, Marcel (1986). Maurice Ravel. Les indispensables de la musique (in French). Paris: Fayard. ISBN 978-2-21-359625-9.
- Nichols, Roger (2011). Ravel. Master Musicians. London: Dent. ISBN 978-0-46-003146-2.

=== General publications ===
- Pittion, Paul (1960). La Musique et son histoire; tome II — de Beethoven à nos jours (in French). Paris: Éditions Ouvrières.

=== Dissertations ===
- Boccard, Aurélien Bastien (2017). Maurice Ravel and Paul Wittgenstein / Le concerto pour la main gauche in Response to World War I. mospace.umsystem.edu/ (Thesis). p. 139.
- Jackson, Aaron Ronald (2014). Maurice Ravel: Trois Chansons and World War I (PDF). libres.uncg.edu (Thesis). p. 62.

=== Articles ===
- Collet, Henri (20 February 1920). "La musique chez soi". Comœdia (in French). Vol. year 14, no. 2622. p. 2.
- Marnold, Jean (16 August 1917). "Musique". Revue de la quinzaine – Mercure de France (in French). Vol. 122, no. 460. p. 701.
- Brussel, Robert (29 December 1937). "La mort de Maurice Ravel". Le Figaro (in French). Vol. 112, no. 363.

=== Online sources ===
- Higginson, Gary (2006). "French Choral Music". musicweb-international.com.
- "Trois Chansons". Hyperion Records. 2002.
- "Maurice Ravel / "Trois beaux oiseaux du Paradis"". kammermusikfuehrer.de (in German). 2004.
