= Menuet antique =

Piano composition by Maurice Ravel

- by Maurice Ravel
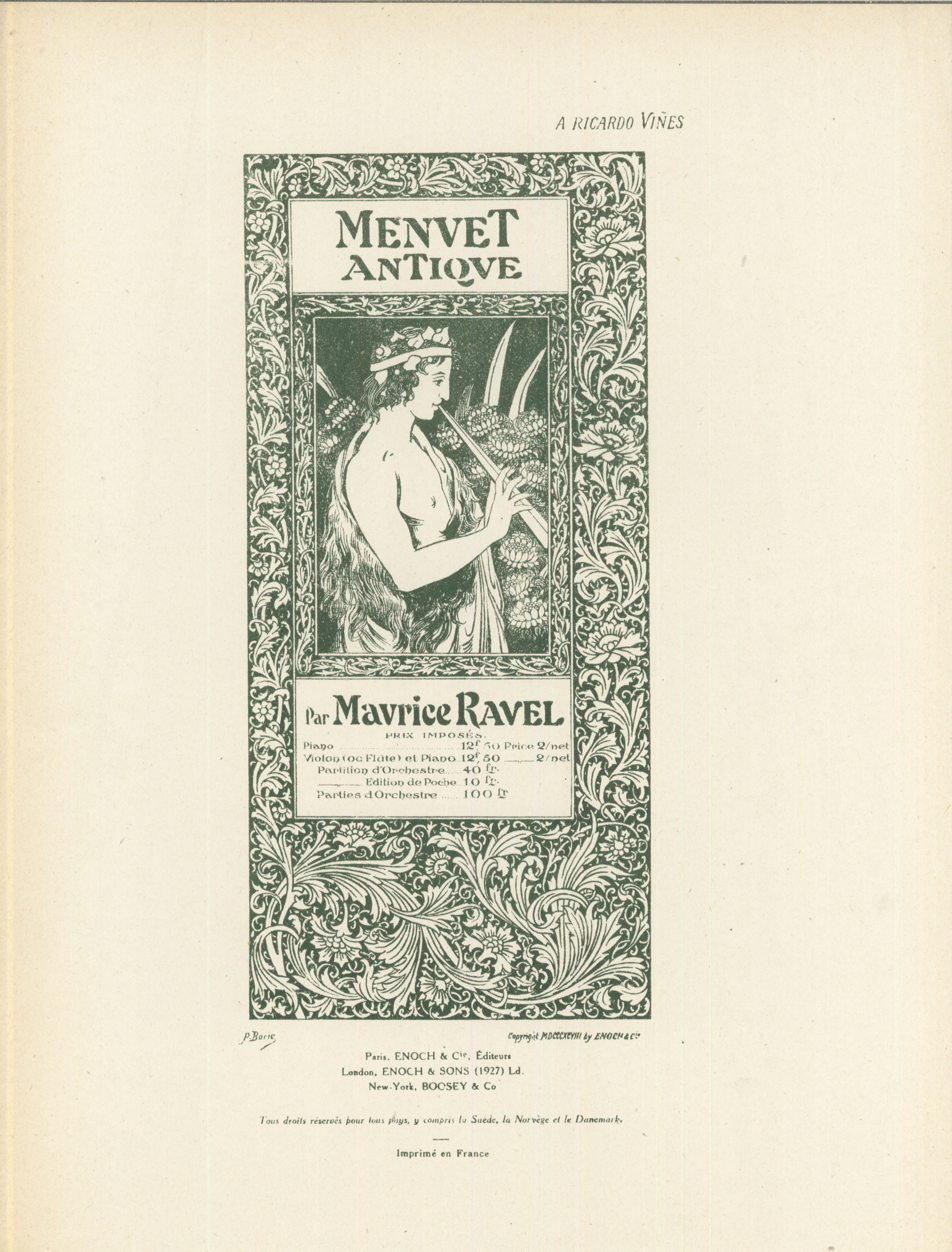
- Cover page of first edition
- Key: F-sharp minor
- Catalogue: M. 7
- Composed: 1895 (piano); 1929 (orchestra)
- Dedication: Ricardo Viñes
- Performed: April 4, 1898 (piano); January 11, 1930 (orchestra)
- Published: 1898 (piano); 1930 (orchestra)
- Scoring: piano; orchestra

Menuet antique is a piece for solo piano composed by Maurice Ravel. The original piano version was written in 1895 and orchestrated by the composer in 1929. Ravel wrote the piece to pay tribute to Emmanuel Chabrier, who had welcomed his early works and helped to establish his musical reputation.

The piano version was first performed on April 18, 1898 by Ricardo Viñes, a long-time friend to whom the composer dedicated the composition. Viñes also gave the premieres of many of Ravel's other works. The orchestral version was first heard in public on January 11, 1930.

The form of the piece is ternary; a typical structure for a minuet. The A sections are more ambiguous with regard to a definite tonality whereas the B section is more firmly rooted in major tonality.

The minuet form reappears in some of Ravel's later compositions, such as the central movement of the Sonatine and the fifth movement of Le tombeau de Couperin.

The orchestral version is scored for an orchestra consisting of 2 flutes, piccolo, 2 oboes, English horn, 2 clarinets, bass clarinet, 2 bassoons, contrabassoon, 4 horns, 3 trumpets, 3 trombones, tuba, timpani, harp, and strings.
