= Albumblätter (Schumann) =

1853 set of piano pieces by Robert Schumann

- Compilation of piano pieces by Robert Schumann
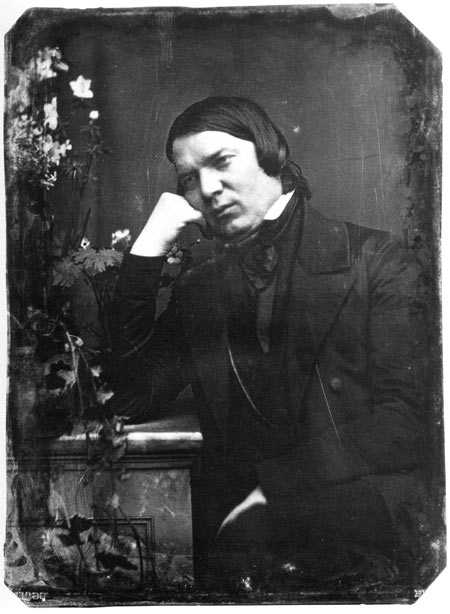
- Daguerreotype of the composer, 1850
- English: Albumleaves
- Opus: 124
- Composed: Before 1853
- Published: December 1853
- Publisher: F. W. Arnold
- Duration: c. 30 minutes
- Movements: 20 pieces
- Scoring: Solo piano

Albumblätter (German for Album Leaves), Op. 124, is a collection of twenty piano pieces by Robert Schumann assembled from earlier unpublished pieces after the success of the Album for the Young (Album für die Jugend), Op. 68. Originally intended to form part of a single collection entitled Spreu (English: Chaff), these pieces were published in 1853, some two years after the first collection Bunte Blätter, Op. 99.

A complete performance of the work lasts roughly thirty minutes.

== History ==
Following the success of the Album für die Jugend, Op. 68, Robert Schumann began work in late 1850 on a new collection of piano pieces. However, unlike Op. 68, this new collection would comprise material that the composer had written earlier in his career, but held back from publication. Schumann held ambivalent feelings about the material, reflected in the proposed title for this new collection Spreu. In the event, his proposed publisher F. W. Arnold rejected the title and the pieces were instead published in two separate collections, Bunte Blätter, Op. 99, published in 1851, and Albumblätter, Op. 124, published in December 1853.

As with Bunte Blätter the pieces span a wide period of the composers active career and come from a variety of compositions by the composer, the earliest material dates from 1832 and comprises pieces, considered for, but not included in Carnaval, Op. 9. Other material used included pieces intended for a composition that was never published entitled XII Burle (English 12 Burleskes), short pieces written to mark specific family occasions and, dating from 1845, a canon sketched for his Studies for Pedal piano, Op. 56, but ultimately not used in that project.

== Movements ==
	Title	Key signature	Average duration (minutes)
1	Impromptu	D minor	1
2	Leides Ahnung (Sorrow's premonition)	A minor	1
3	Scherzino	F major	1
4	Valse	A minor	1
5	Phantasietanz (Fantasy dance)	E minor	1
6	Wiegenliedchen (Lullaby)	G major	2
7	Ländler	D major	1
8	Lied ohne Ende (Song without end)	F major	3
9	Impromptu	B♭ major	1
10	Valse	E♭ major	1
11	Romance	B♭ major	2
12	Burla (Burleske)	F minor	1
13	Larghetto	F minor	1
14	Vision	F major	1
15	Valse	A♭ major	1
16	Schlummerlied (Slumber song)	E♭ major	4
17	Elfe (Fairy)	A♭ major	1
18	Botschaft (Message)	E major	2
19	Phantasiestück (Fantasy piece)	A major	3
20	Canon	D major	1
