= Tout est lumière =

Choral composition by Maurice Ravel

- Choral music by Maurice Ravel
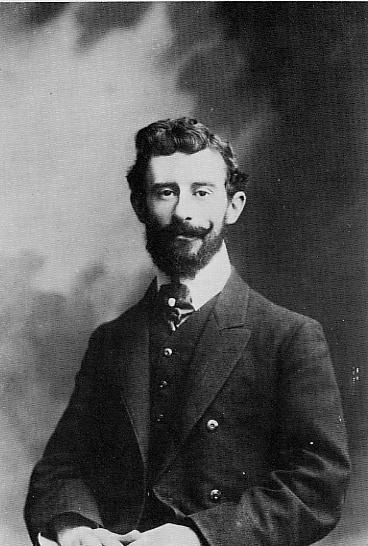
- The composer in 1907
- Catalogue: M. 28
- Text: poem from Victor Hugo's Les Feuilles d'automne
- Language: French
- Composed: 1901
- Scoring: soprano; mixed choir; orchestra

Tout est lumière (All is light), M. 28, is a piece of choral music by Maurice Ravel. He wrote it as a student in 1901 for the Prix de Rome competition, setting a poem by Victor Hugo for soprano, mixed choir and orchestra.

== History ==
Ravel composed Tout est lumière in 1901 while studying at the Conservatoire de Paris, where his teachers were Charles-René, Pessard and Fauré. It was written as an entry to the Prix de Rome competition. The prize, established in 1803 and given annually, came with a scholarship stay at the Villa Medici in Rome for two to three years and afterwards further studies in Germany. In the first round, the students had to present a fugue and a chorus; those selected by the jury had to compose a cantata about a given text for the second round.

Ravel applied for the prize five times, first in 1900. In 1901, he submitted Tout est lumière in the first round, which earned him a spot in the second round. Ravel also took part in the competition in 1902, 1903 and 1905, but never achieved the first prize.

For Tout est lumière, Ravel set a text from Hugo's poem collection Les Feuilles d'automne. He scored the work for soprano, mixed choir and orchestra. Like his other entries to the competition, the piece remained unpublished.

== Text and music ==
The text by Hugo is in four stanzas, taken from the poem "Spectacle rassurant" and beginning "Tout est lumière! Tout est joie!". It has been described as "a brightly optimistic poem about the perfection of nature".

Ravel scored the composition for soprano, mixed choir and an orchestra of two flutes, two oboes, two clarinets, two bassoons, two horns, timpani and strings. The music has been described as simple in harmony, with "bright, gently swaying" choral singing and "delicate phrases" of the solost. The soprano performs the third stanza. After a reprise, the music ends softly with a coda. Although the work is rather conventional, it shows the influence of Debussy's musical language. Roger Nichols, Ravel's biographer, described the orchestration as efficient but without much contrast; he noticed a reminiscence of Wagner's Götterdämmerung in the last cadence.

== Recordings ==
Tout est lumière was recorded in 1995 in a collection of music written for the Prix de Rome by André Caplet, Debussy and Ravel, performed by the choir and orchestra of the Sorbonne, conducted by Jacques Grimbert. It was recorded in a collection of cantatas that Ravel composed for the Prix de Rome in 2022, performed by the Choir and Orchestre national des Pays de la Loire conducted by Pascal Rophésous.
