= Zortziko =

Basque folk dance

The zortzico is a dance rhythm that originates in the Basque Country. It is also used as an accompaniment rhythm for vocal melodies, such as "Gernikako arbola", the unofficial anthem of the Basques, composed in 1853 by José María Iparraguirre (Laborde 2001).

The zortzico has a distinctive 5/8 time signature, consisting of three subdivisions of 1, 2, and 2 beats. Some theories hold that it is in 5/4 time, "like the Rueda except that the 2nd and 4th beats are almost always dotted notes" (Kennedy 2006), or that it actually is a double compound meter combining an irregular binary (5/16 divided 2 + 3) and an irregular ternary (8/16 divided 2 + 3 + 3), creating an ostinato pattern of "irregular bichrome" measures, which in Constantin Brăiloiu's terminology is called an aksak rhythm (Laborde 2001).

Despite the zortzico's origins and continued popularity in folk music, some composers have also incorporated it into classical music. These composers include Isaac Albéniz, Charles-Valentin Alkan, Aita Donostia, Jesús Guridi, Gabriel Pierné, Joaquín Turina, Maurice Ravel (in his piano trio as well as in his final song cycle, Don Quichotte à Dulcinée), Pablo de Sarasate, Pablo Sorozábal, and José María Usandizaga.) British composer Michael Finnissy used the zortziko rhythm as the basis for his 2009 orchestral piece Zortzico, commissioned by the Basque National Orchestra.
