= Piano Trio (Ravel) =

Composition by Maurice Ravel

- by Maurice Ravel
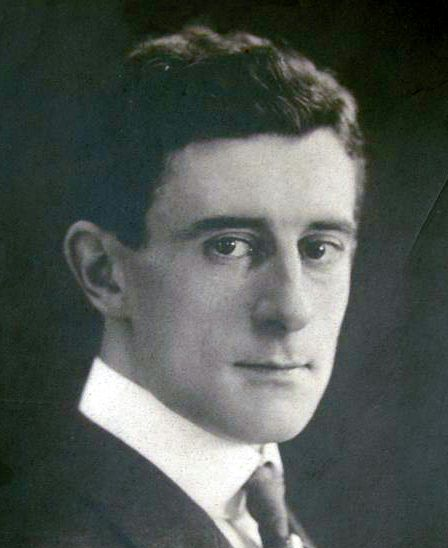
- Ravel in 1913
- Key: A minor
- Composed: 1914
- Dedication: André Gedalge
- Performed: 1915
- Movements: four
- Scoring: piano; violin; cello

Maurice Ravel's Piano Trio for piano, violin, and cello is a chamber work composed in 1914. Dedicated to Ravel's counterpoint teacher André Gedalge, the trio was first performed in Paris in January 1915, by Alfredo Casella (piano), Gabriel Willaume (violin), and Louis Feuillard (cello). A typical performance of the work lasts about 30 minutes.

== Composition ==
Ravel had been planning to write a trio for at least six years before beginning work in earnest in March 1914. At the outset, Ravel remarked to his pupil Maurice Delage, "I’ve written my trio. Now all I need are the themes." During the summer of 1914, Ravel did his compositional work in the French Basque commune of Saint-Jean-de-Luz. Ravel was born across the bay in the Basque town of Ciboure; his mother was Basque, and he felt a deep identification with his Basque heritage. During the Trio's composition, Ravel was also working on a piano concerto based on Basque themes entitled Zazpiak Bat (Basque for "The Seven are One"). Although eventually abandoned, this project left its mark on the Trio, particularly in the opening movement, which Ravel later noted was "Basque in colouring."

However, Ravel's first biographer and friend Roland-Manuel had a different account of the theme's origin:

Our great musicians have never been ashamed of admiring a pretty tune from a café concert. It is said that it was in watching ice-cream vendors dancing a fandango at Saint-Jean-de-Luz that Ravel picked up the first theme of his Trio in A, a theme which he believed to be Basque, but wasn't.

While initial progress on the Trio was slow, the outbreak of World War I in August 1914 spurred on Ravel to finish the work so that he could enlist in the army. A few days after France's entry into the war, Ravel wrote again to Maurice Delage: "Yes, I am working on the Trio with the sureness and lucidity of a madman." By September he had finished it, writing to Igor Stravinsky, "The idea that I should be leaving at once made me get through five months' work in five weeks! My Trio is finished." In October, he was accepted as a nurse's aide by the Army, and in March 1916 he became a volunteer truck driver for the 13th Artillery Regiment.

== Musical overview ==
In composing the Trio, Ravel was aware of the compositional difficulties posed by the genre: how to reconcile the contrasting sonorities of the piano and the string instruments, and how to achieve balance between the three instrumental voices – in particular, how to make that of the cello stand out from the others, which are more easily heard. In tackling the former problem, Ravel adopted an orchestral approach to his writing: by making extensive use of the extreme ranges of each instrument, he created a texture of sound unusually rich for a chamber work. He employed coloristic effects such as trills, tremolos, harmonics, glissandos, and arpeggios, thus demanding a high level of technical proficiency from all three musicians. Meanwhile, to achieve clarity in texture and to secure instrumental balance, Ravel frequently spaced the violin and cello lines two octaves apart, with the right hand of the piano playing between them.

Inspiration for the musical content of the Trio came from a wide variety of sources, from Basque dance to Malaysian poetry. However, Ravel did not deviate from his usual predilection for traditional musical forms. The Trio follows the standard format for a four-movement classical work, with the outer movements in sonata form flanking a scherzo and trio and a slow movement. Nevertheless, Ravel manages to introduce his own innovations within this conventional framework.

== Movements ==
The Trio is written in the key of A minor and consists of four movements:

1. Modéré (A minor - C major)
2. Pantoum (Assez vif) (A minor - F♯ major - F♯ minor - F major - A major)
3. Passacaille (Très large) (F♯ minor)
4. Final (Animé) (A major)

=== I. Modéré ===
According to Ravel, the first movement draws on the zortziko, a Basque dance form. The movement is notated in 8/8 time, each bar being subdivided into a 3+2+3 rhythmic pattern. The influence of Zazpiak Bat is most obvious in the opening theme, whose rhythm is identical to that of the Zazpiak Bat main theme but with halved note values. Also notable is the melody's stepwise movement before followed by a leap of a fourth; the opening themes of the other three movements are similarly constructed—in the second and fourth movements, the jump is of a fifth.

Ravel employs sonata form in this movement but not without introducing his own touches. The second theme is presented in the tonic A minor, and reappears untransposed in the recapitulation but with different harmonies. To avoid overuse of the tonic key, Ravel ends the movement in the relative key of C major. In the recapitulation, the appearance of the main theme in the piano is superimposed over a rhythmically modified version of the second theme in the strings. This juxtaposition of themes was a favourite device of Ravel's, who used it in other works as well, such as the Menuet antique and the Menuet in Le Tombeau de Couperin.

=== II. Pantoum: Assez vif ===
This movement is based on a traditional scherzo and trio A-B-A form. The scherzo presents two themes: the piano opens with the spiky first theme in A minor, while the strings respond in double octaves with the smoother second theme in F♯ minor. The name of the movement refers to a Malaysian verse form, in which the second and fourth lines of each four-line stanza become the first and third lines of the next. While Ravel never commented on the significance of the movement's title, Brian Newbould has suggested that the poetic form is reflected in the way these two themes are developed in alternation.

The F-major melody of the trio is in a completely different metre (4/2) from the scherzo (3/4). When the piano introduces it, the strings continue to play material derived from the scherzo in 3/4 time, and the two time signatures continue to coexist in the different parts until the return of the trio.

=== III. Passacaille: Très large ===
The third movement is a passacaglia based on the piano's opening eight-bar bass line, which is derived from the first theme of the Pantoum. The cello joins next, followed by the violin. While the melody is passed between the three instruments, the movement builds singlemindedly to a powerful climax, then dies away.

=== IV. Final: Animé ===
Against a backdrop of violin arpeggio harmonics (previously used by Ravel in his Trois poèmes de Mallarmé) and double-stopped trills from the cello, the piano presents the five-bar first theme. As in the first movement, irregular time signatures are again in use: the movement alternates between 5/4 and 7/4 time. The trumpet calls in the development section (played by the piano after rehearsal number 7) may be an allusion to the declaration of war in August 1914, which coincided with Ravel's work on this movement. As the most orchestral of the four movements, the Final exploits the resources of the three players to the utmost, and Ravel rounds off the entire work with a brilliant coda.

== Popular culture ==
- The first movement was used extensively as a soundtrack in the 1992 film Un cœur en hiver (A Heart in Winter). The music credits in the film are given to Maurice Ravel.
- An adapted version of the third movement features in the 2014 film Birdman or (The Unexpected Virtue of Ignorance).
- In a 1993 London Proms concert, Yan-Pascal Tortelier premièred his orchestration of the trio with the BBC Philharmonic Orchestra.
