= Tristan Klingsor =

French poet, musician, painter and art critic (1874–1966)

Tristan Klingsor, birth name (Arthur Justin) Léon Leclère (born Lachapelle-aux-Pots, Oise department, 8 August 1874; died Nogent-sur-Marne, 3 August 1966), was a French poet, musician, painter and art critic, best known for his artistic association with the composer Maurice Ravel.

His pseudonym, combining the names of Wagner's hero Tristan (from Tristan und Isolde) and his (Wagner's) villain Klingsor (from Parsifal), indicates one aspect of his artistic interests, though he said that he chose the names because he liked the "sounds" they made, the associations with Arthurian and Breton legends he had read as a child, and that there were already too many literary men in Paris with the surname Leclère. Some of his "orientalist" poems are addressed to a mysterious "jeune étranger," possibly symbolising his gay orientation, although he did marry in 1903, and had a daughter two years later. His first collection, Filles-fleurs (1895), was in eleven-syllable verse. After this he often used a personal form of free verse. He was a member of the Fantaisiste group of French poets. Certain of his poems were set to music by composers including Charles Koechlin, Georges Hüe and Georges Migot, and he is best remembered as providing the texts for Ravel’s song cycle Shéhérazade (1903). He and Ravel belonged to the Paris avant-garde artistic group known as Les Apaches for whose meetings he was sometimes the host. He recorded his long acquaintance with the composer in an essay, "L'Époque Ravel". Ravel dedicated the first of his Trois Chansons to him in 1915.

Klingsor was also a painter (exhibiting from 1905 at the Salon d'Automne and being awarded the Prix Puvis de Chavannes in 1952). His visual art was reviewed twice by Guillaume Apollinaire: In 1906, he called Klingsor's attempts "Merde!" but in 1908, he was kinder, stating: "Klingsor animates his painting with the same sentimental delicacy that gives his poetry its somewhat contrived, dated charm. For my part, I prefer the poet to the painter.” He was also the author of several studies on art, and a composer in his own right, with several collections of melodies, four-part songs, and piano music.

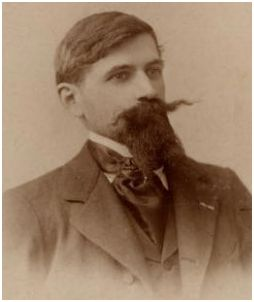
Portrait of Tristan Klingsor, was a French poet.

== List of writings ==
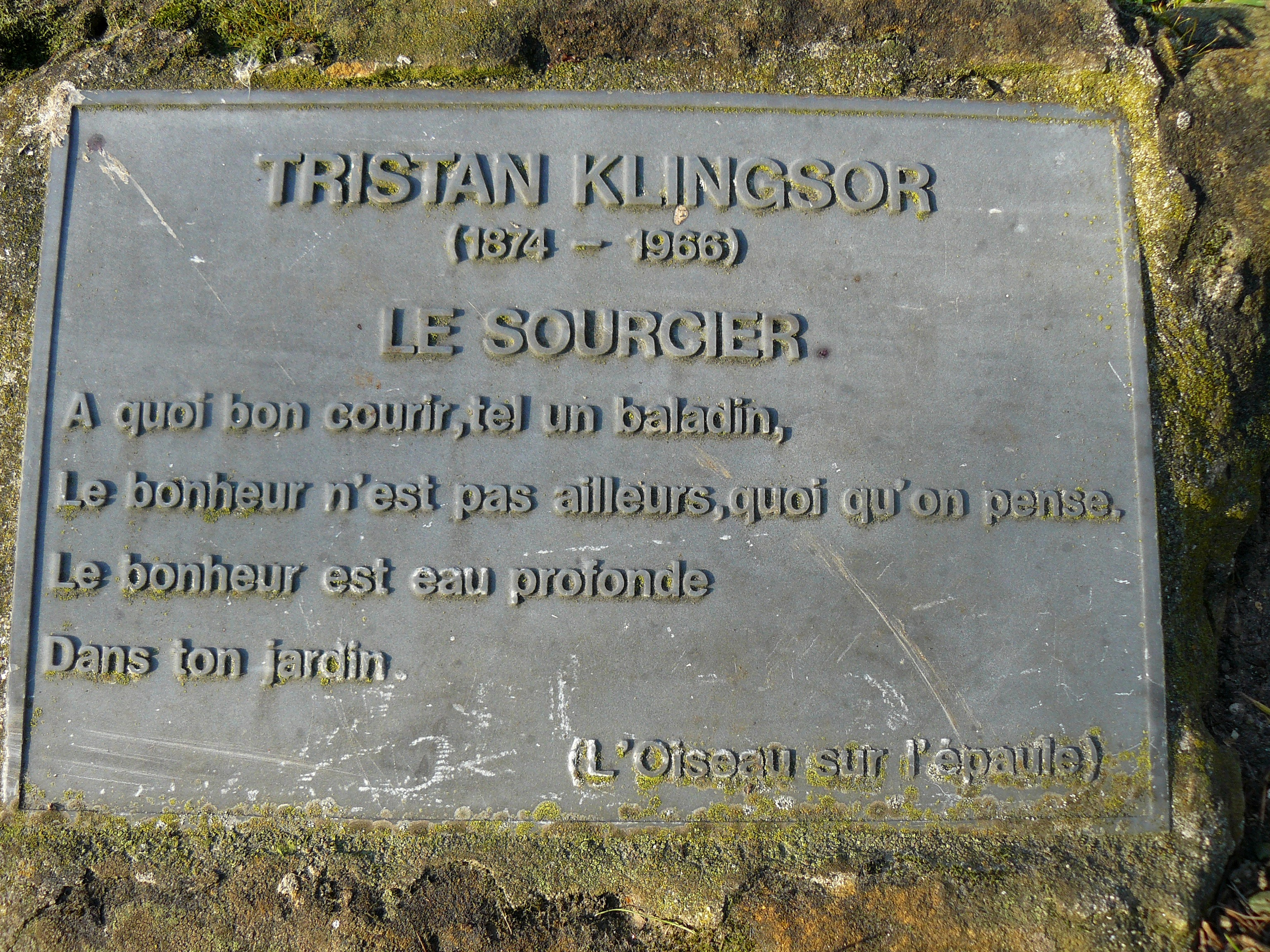

- Filles-Fleurs, poems, Mercure de France, 1895
- Squelettes fleuris, poems, Mercure de France, 1897
- L’Escarpolette, poems, Mercure de France, 1899
- La Jalousie du Vizir, story, Mercure de France, 1899
- Le Livre d'Esquisses, poems, Mercure de France, 1900
- Schéhérazade, poems, Mercure de France, 1903
- Petits métiers des rues de Paris, prose, 1904
- La Duègne apprivoisée, comedy, 1907
- Le Valet de Cœur, poems, Mercure de France, 1908
- Les caprices de Goya, critical essay, 1909
- Les Femmes de théâtre au XVIIIe siècle, 1911
- Poèmes de Bohème, poems, Mercure de France, 1913
- Hubert Robert et les paysagistes français du XVIIIe siècle, 1913
- Les derniers-états des lettres et des arts : la peinture, 1913
- Chroniques du Chaperon et de la Braguette, poems, 1913
- La Peinture (L’art français depuis vingt ans), Rieder, Paris, 1921
- Humoresques, poems, 1921
- L'Escarbille d'or, poems, Chiberre, Paris, 1922
- La Peinture (L’art français depuis vingt-cinq ans), Rieder, Paris, 1922
- Cézanne, Rieder, Paris, 1923
- Chardin, collection Maîtres Anciens et Modernes, Nilsson, Paris, 1924
- Essai sur le chapeau, Les Cahiers de Paris, 1926
- Léonard de Vinci (Maîtres de l'art ancien), Rieder, Paris, 1930
- Poèmes du Brugnon, 1933
- Mesures pour rien, in Poésie 42, 1942
- Cinquante Sonnets du Dormeur éveillé, 1949
- Florilège poétique, poems selected by Georges Bouquet and Pierre Menanteau, L’Amitié par le livre, Blainville-sur-Mer, 1955
- Album, 1955
- Claude Lepape, 1958
- Le Tambour voilé, Mercure de France, 1960
- Second florilège, with illustrations by the poet, 1964
- Maisons Aloysius, 1964
- L’Art de peindre, collection Initiations, Braun, Paris
- Poèmes de la princesse Chou, 1974
