= Sonatine (Ravel) =

1905 piano composition by Maurice Ravel

- by Maurice Ravel
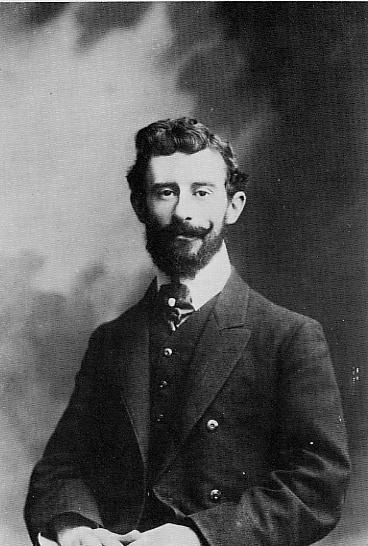
- The composer in 1907
- Dedication: Ida and Cipa Godebski
- Performed: 10 March 1906
- Movements: three
- Scoring: piano

Sonatine is a piano work written by Maurice Ravel. Although Ravel wrote in his autobiography that he wrote the sonatina after his piano suite Miroirs, it seems to have been written between 1903 and 1905. He most likely referred to the dates he finished both of the works.

== Composition ==
Ravel wrote the first movement of the Sonatine for a competition sponsored by the Weekly Critical Review magazine after being encouraged by a close friend who was a contributor to that publication. The competition requirement was the composition of the first movement of a piano sonatina no longer than 75 bars, with the prize being 100 francs.

In 1941, the journal Music & Letters printed the article "When Ravel Composed to Order" by Michel-Dimitri Calvocoressi. Calvocoressi discussed how he supposedly encouraged Ravel to write the piece in response to a competition posted in the Paris Weekly Critical Review. Peter Jost of G. Henle Verlag found the original article in the Review published in three March 1903 editions. The original manuscript that Ravel submitted had the text par Verla (by Verla) written and struck out, replaced with par Maurice Ravel. Ravel submitted the piece under a pseudonym and chose an anagram of his name.

The Sonatine was first performed fully in Lyon on 10 March 1906 by Paule de Lestang. Shortly afterwards the piece received a Paris premiere, where it was played by Gabriel Grovlez. Ravel dedicated the work to Ida and Cipa Godebski; he later dedicated his Ma mère l'Oye suite to their children.

== Structure ==
I. Modéré

II. Mouvement de menuet

III. Animé
performed by Irene Posviatovska

The piece is in three movements:

1. Modéré (moderate, F♯ minor – F♯ major)
2. Mouvement de menuet (Minuet tempo, D♭ major)
3. Animé (animated, F♯ minor – F♯ major)

The leaping fourth melody of the first movement reappears in variations against different textures in the second and third movements.

The first movement is a well-structured, even straightforward, sonata form (albeit utilizing Ravel's Impressionistic harmonic colorings). Two themes emerge in the exposition—the first in tonic key of F♯ minor, and the second in D major and B minor.

Owing to its diminutive form, the following minuet exists without a trio. Shifting to the key of the dominant (here spelt as D♭ major), it unfolds as a slow waltz, elegant and restrained but nonetheless building through moments of passion and intensity.

Lastly, the toccata finale is the most technically challenging of the Sonatine's three movements. Inspired in part by the keyboard writing of Couperin and Rameau, the movement shifts restlessly between 3/4 and 5/4 time and abounds in energy, driving the work to a brilliant conclusion.

== Reception ==
Reception for Ravel's Sonatine has been mixed but generally favorable. Marcel Marnat wrote that Sonatine captivates from the very first measure in its depth, adding that in its conciseness and radiance, it is one of Ravel's defining works.

Ravel was known to value the work and performed it frequently. Sonatine is easier than some of his other works, such as Gaspard de la nuit, and Ravel (who was anxious about his skills as a pianist) probably performed it because of this. He did not, however, perform the third movement, as it was technically challenging for him.

== Arrangement ==
Carlos Salzedo transcribed Sonatine for flute, harp and cello (or viola), titling the transcription Sonatine en Trio, an instrumentation that echoes the second sonata of Six sonatas for various instruments by Claude Debussy. Various other arrangements for solo instruments with piano accompaniment exist as well.

Kenneth Hesketh orchestrated the Sonatine in 2024, the orchestration receiving its premiere in September of that year with the BBC Philharmonic conducted by Paul Daniel. The orchestration is published by Ravel Edition.

== Notes ==
=== Sources ===
- Nichols, Roger (2011). Ravel (1st ed.). New Haven, Connecticut: Yale University Press. ISBN 978-0-300-18776-2.
