= Luc Albert Moreau =

French painter (1882–1948)

- Born: 9 December 1882; Paris, France
- Died: 25 April 1948 (aged 65); Paris, France
- Occupation: Painter

Luc Albert Moreau (9 December 1882 – 25 April 1948) was a French painter.

In 1910–1911, he participated in the first inaugural exhibition of the Knave of Diamonds in Moscow with three canvases (Groupe, Tête, Paysage). His work was part of the painting event in the art competition at the 1948 Summer Olympics.
