= Menuet sur le nom d'Haydn (Ravel) =

Piano composition by Maurice Ravel

- by Maurice Ravel
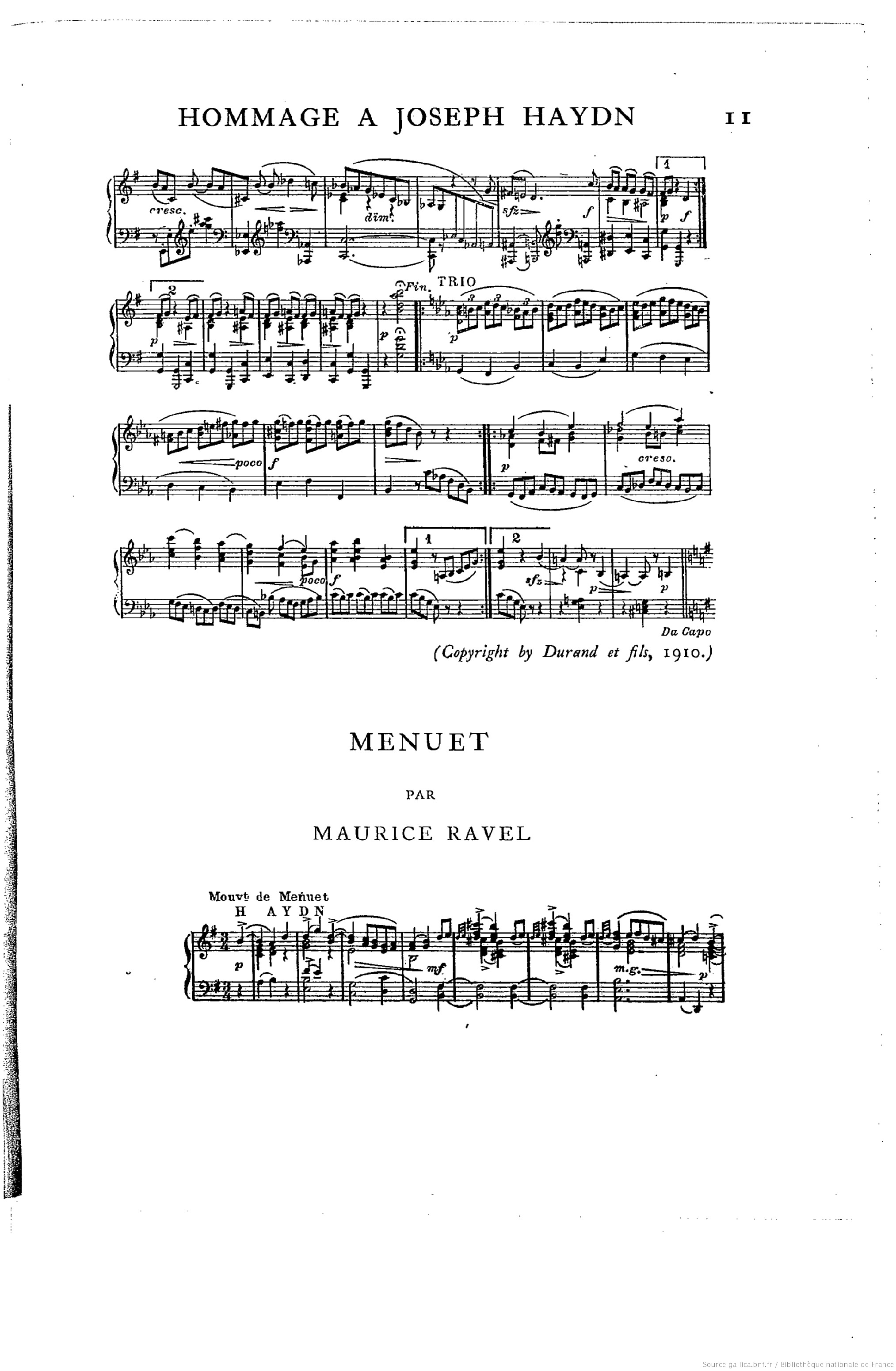
- Catalogue: M. 58
- Composed: 1909
- Published: 1910

Premiere
- Date: 11 March 1911; 115 years ago
- Location: Salle Pleyel, Paris
- Performers: Ennemond Trillat

Menuet sur le nom d'Haydn is a minuet for solo piano written by Maurice Ravel in 1909 to mark the centenary of Joseph Haydn's death.

== Description ==
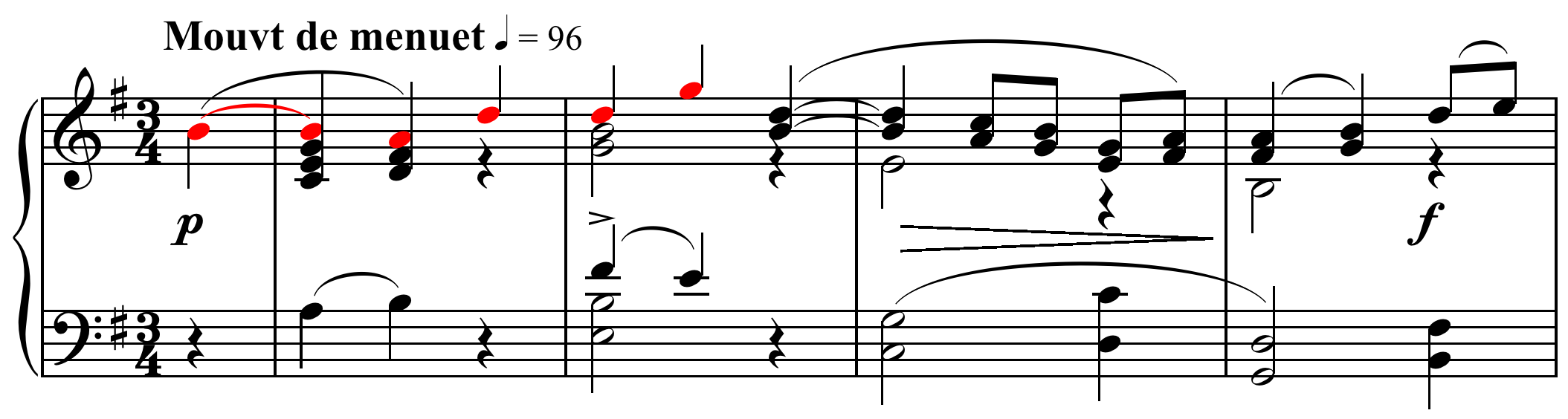
The first 4 bars of Menuet sur le nom d'Haydn

The piece is only 54 bars long and lasts for about a minute and a half. The theme is based on Haydn's own name as a five-note motif. The letter H represents B natural, A and D representing their respective pitches, Y as D natural and N as G natural. In the score, the use of this motif is marked using their letters including several inverted and retrograde versions.

== History ==
This work came about as a result of a commission by the Revue musicale mensuelle de la Société Internationale de Musique. In total, six composers were commissioned: Maurice Ravel, ('Menuet sur le nom d'Haydn'), Claude Debussy ('Hommage à Haydn'), Vincent d'Indy, Paul Dukas ('Prélude Élégiaque'), Reynaldo Hahn ('Theme Varié sur le nom de Haydn'), and Charles-Marie Widor ('Fugue sur le nom d'Haydn').

Each composer was given the same task: to write a piece based on the musical equivalent of Haydn's name.
