= Don Quichotte à Dulcinée =

Song cycle by Maurice Ravel

- Song cycle by Maurice Ravel
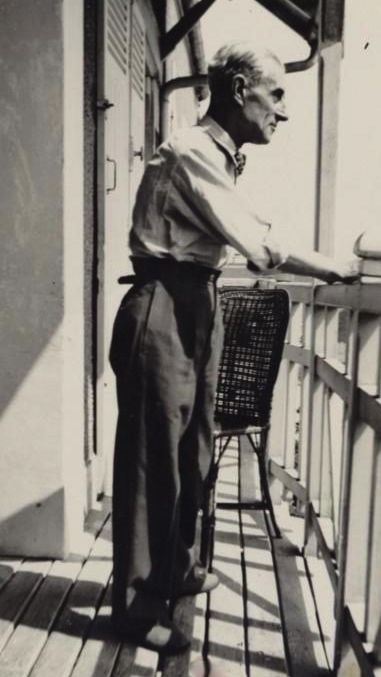
- The composer in 1930
- Text: by Paul Morand
- Language: French
- Based on: Don Quixote
- Composed: 1932–33
- Performed: 1934 (orchestral version)
- Movements: three
- Scoring: voice; piano

Don Quichotte à Dulcinée is a song cycle by Maurice Ravel based on the story of Don Quixote. It was first composed for voice and piano but later orchestrated. The songs are traditionally performed by a baritone or bass(-baritone). The cycle is made up of three independent pieces: Chanson Romanesque, Chanson épique, and Chanson à boire. The text was written by the librettist Paul Morand. It was composed between the years of 1932 and 1933.

== Composition history ==
This was the last of Maurice Ravel's compositions, commissioned by the celebrated film director G. W. Pabst for a cinema version of Don Quixote starring the legendary bass Fyodor Chaliapin. The score was to include four songs (one more than the final version) along with background music for several episodes. As Ravel worked on the project in 1932, however, he suffered the increasingly disabling effects of Pick’s disease, a cerebral-neurological condition that gradually robbed him of motor skills and memory while afflicting him with periods of aphasia. How much Pabst knew about Ravel’s illness is unclear; but as 1932 wore on with no immediate prospect of receiving all the music, the director fired Ravel and hired Jacques Ibert for the job. In fact, Pabst had simultaneously commissioned several composers, so that he could choose at will. When the film, completed in 1933, reached theaters with Ibert's music, Ravel sued the producers, but never obtained a judgement.

In the end, Ravel wrote only three songs, both in piano-accompanied and orchestrated versions; the very ill Ravel was assisted at least in notating the orchestration by Lucien Garban and Manuel Rosenthal. He completed them in 1933 thanks to extensive secretarial help provided by friends and assistants (his condition soon progressed so far that he could not write his name). The first public performance, given by baritone Martial Singher in December 1934 at the Théâtre du Châtelet in Paris, featured the orchestral version, with an ensemble conducted by Paul Paray.

For the lusty opening "Chanson Romanesque", Ravel chose the guajira dance-pattern, exploiting the quirks of its alternating 6/8 and 3/4 meters for word-painting, and enlivening it by sometimes garnishing the 3/4 with a clashing dissonance. Sensuality subtly increases with a turn to the major, and the final rhapsodizing on the beloved ("O Dulcinée") deepens the emotional perspective of all that has gone before. Parallel harmonies create the atmosphere of medieval Christian liturgy in the prayer of "Chanson épique." Here the oft-reiterated asymmetrical dance-rhythm of the zortzico imparts a sustained urgency unusual in slow music. Against the manic jota that dominates the "Chanson à boire", a tipsy Don Quixote revels in flamenco vocalizing and unleashes peals of laughter as keyboard flourishes suggest the bubbling and sparkling of wine.

== Lyrics ==
Chanson Romanesque

Si vous me disiez que la Terre
A tant tourner vous offensa,
Je lui dépêcherais Pança:
Vous la verriez fixe et se taire.
Si vous me disiez que l'ennui
Vous vient du ciel trop fleuri d'astres,
Déchirant les divins cadastres,
Je faucherais d'un coup la nuit.
Si vous me disiez que l'espace
Ainsi vidé ne vous plaît point,
Chevalier Dieu, la lance au poing,
J'étoilerais le vent qui passe.
Mais si vous disiez que mon sang
Est plus à moi qu'à vous ma Dame,
Je blêmirais dessous le blâme
Et je mourrais vous bénissant.
Ô Dulcinée...

Chanson épique

Bon Saint Michel qui me donnez loisir
De voir ma Dame et de l’entendre,
Bon Saint Michel qui me daignez choisir
Pour lui complaire et la défendre,
Bon Saint Michel veuillez descendre
Avec Saint Georges sur l’autel
De la Madone au bleu mantel.
D’un rayon du ciel bénissez ma lame
Et son égale en pureté
Et son égale en piété
Comme en pudeur et chasteté:
Ma Dame.
Ô grands Saint Georges et Saint Michel,
L’ange qui veille sur ma veille,
Ma douce Dame si pareille
A Vous, Madone au bleu mantel !
Amen.

Chanson à boire

Foin du bâtard, illustre Dame,
Qui pour me perdre à vos doux yeux
Dit que l'amour et le vin vieux
Mettent en deuil mon cœur, mon âme !
Je bois à la joie !
La joie est le seul but
Où je vais droit...
Lorsque j'ai bu !
A la joie, à la joie !
Je bois à la joie !
Foin du jaloux, brune maîtresse,
Qui geint, qui pleure et fait serment
D’être toujours ce pâle amant
Qui met de l'eau dans son ivresse!

== See also ==
- Don Quixote (1933 film)
