= Bunte Blätter =

1850 piano pieces by Robert Schumann

- Compilation of piano pieces by Robert Schumann
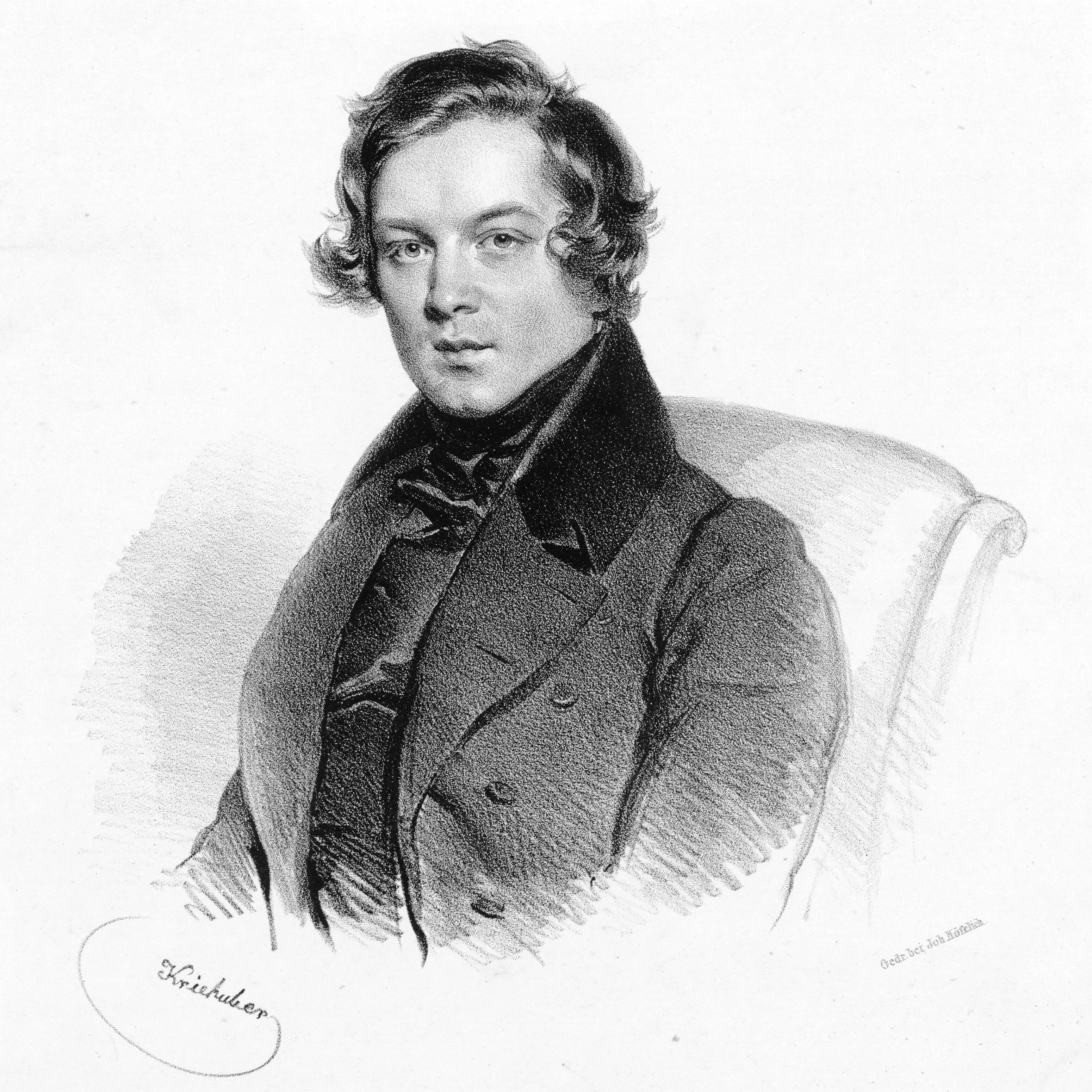
- Lithograph of the composer, 1839
- English: Colourful Leaves
- Opus: 99
- Composed: 1834–49
- Published: 1851
- Publisher: F. W. Arnold
- Duration: c. 40 minutes
- Movements: 14 pieces
- Scoring: Solo piano

Bunte Blätter (English: Colourful Leaves), Op. 99, is a collection of fourteen piano pieces by Robert Schumann assembled from earlier unpublished pieces after the success of the Album for the Young (Album für die Jugend), Op. 68. Upon publication in 1852 the pieces were issued both as a complete set and individual pieces, the latter in differently coloured covers.

== History ==
Robert Schumann started work on assembling the collection of pieces that were eventually published as the Bunte Blätter Op. 99 and Albumblätter Op. 124 in late 1850. His original plan was to publish the pieces as a single collection entitled Spreu (English: Chaff). When the music publisher F. W. Arnold objected to the proposed title, Schumann decided to split the collection.

All of the pieces used were works that Schumann had composed in the past and had either not intended for publication, or had been rejected for publication with earlier sets of pieces. Ernst Herttrich in his preface to the Henle score, comments that the specific criteria the composer used to select the pieces included in either this collection or the succeeding one are unknown, though the pieces are organised loosely from least to most difficult. Dates of composition range from 1834 (Note: Albumblätter III was originally composed for Carnaval Op. 9.) to 1849. (Note: The march that closes the set was composed at the same time as the composer's Vier Märsche, Op. 76.)

Both Clara Schumann and Brahms wrote sets of variations on the theme of the fourth movement ("Ziemlich langsam") from Bunte Blätter: Clara in her opus 20, and Brahms in his opus 9.

Many writers have pointed out that several of the pieces had personal associations for the author, for example, the first piece in the collection was a Christmas greeting the composer had composed for his wife Clara in 1838.

== Pieces in the collection ==
Bunte Blätter is a compilation of fourteen pieces, with a total performance time of around 40 minutes.

	Title	Key signature	Average estimated duration (mins)
1	Stücke I (Piece I); Nicht schnell, mit Innigkeit - Not fast, with sensitivity	A major	2
2	Stücke II (Piece II); Sehr rasch - Very fast	E minor	1
3	Stücke III (Piece III); Frisch - Fresh	E major	1
4	Albumblätter I (Album Leaf I); Ziemlich langsam - Pretty slow	F♯ minor	2
5	Albumblätter II (Album Leaf II); Schnell - fast	B minor	1
6	Albumblätter III (Album Leaf III); Ziemlich langsam, sehr gesangvoll - Pretty slow, very songlike	A♭ major	2
7	Albumblätter IV (Album Leaf IV); Sehr langsam - Very slow	E♭ minor	3
8	Albumblätter V (Album Leaf V); Langsam - Slowly	E♭ major	2
9	Novelette; Lebhaft - Lively	B minor	3
10	Präludium (Prelude); Energisch - Energetic	B♭ minor	1
11	Marsch (March); Sehr getragen - Very drawn out	D minor	8
12	Abendmusik (Evening Music); Im Menuetttempo - Minuet tempo	B♭ major	4
13	Scherzo; Lebhaft - Lively	G minor	4
14	Geschwindmarsch (Swift March); Sehr markiert - Very marked	G minor	4
