= Album for the Young =

Sheet music album composed by Robert Schumann

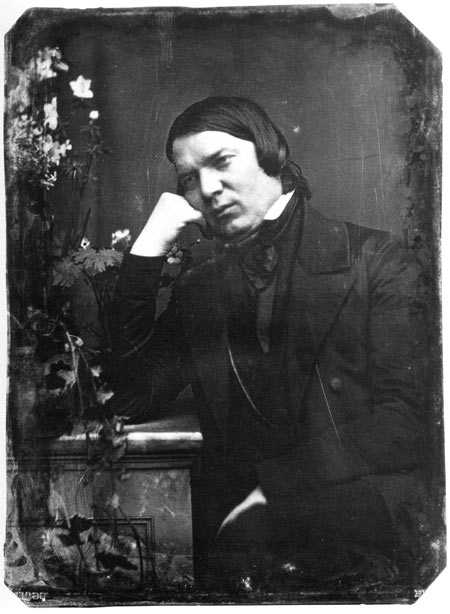
Robert Schumann in an 1850 daguerreotype

Album for the Young (Album für die Jugend), Op. 68, was composed by Robert Schumann in 1848 for his three daughters. The album consists of a collection of 43 short works for the piano. Unlike the Kinderszenen, they are suitable to be played by children or beginners. The second part, starting at Nr. 19 ("Kleine Romanze"), is marked Für Erwachsenere (For adults; For more grown-up ones) and contains more demanding pieces.

== List of pieces ==
1. "Melodie"

10. "Fröhlicher Landmann, von der Arbeit zurückkehrend"
MIDI renditions

=== First part ===
1. Melodie (Melody), C major
2. Soldatenmarsch (Soldiers' march), G major
3. Trällerliedchen (Lilting song or Humming song), C major
4. Ein Choral (Chorale), G major. Harmonisation of "Selig sind, die aus Erbamen" or "Freu dich sehr, o meine Seele", the concluding chorale of BWV 39
5. Stückchen (A little piece), C major
6. Armes Waisenkind (The poor orphan), A minor
7. Jägerliedchen (Hunting song), F major
8. Wilder Reiter ('The wild rider' or 'The wild horseman'), A minor
9. Volksliedchen (Folk song), D minor
10. Fröhlicher Landmann, von der Arbeit zurückkehrend ('The merry peasant, returning from work' or 'The happy farmer'), F major
11. Sizilianisch (Sicilienne), A minor
12. Knecht Ruprecht (Santa Claus), A minor
13. Mai, lieber Mai (May, dear May), E major
14. Kleine Studie (Little etude), G major
15. Frühlingsgesang (Spring song), E major
16. Erster Verlust (First loss), E minor
17. Kleiner Morgenwanderer (Little morning wanderer), A major
18. Schnitterliedchen (The reaper's song), C major

=== Second part ===
Kleine Romanze (Little romance), A minor
1. Ländliches Lied (Land song), A major
2. ⁂ (untitled), C major (based on "Prison-Terzetto" ("Euch werde Lohn in bessern Welten") from Beethoven's Fidelio)
3. Rundgesang (Chant), A major
4. Reiterstück (The horseman), D minor
5. Ernteliedchen (Harvest song), A major
6. Nachklänge aus dem Theater (Echoes from the theatre), A minor
7. ⁂ (untitled), F major
8. Kanonisches Liedchen (Song in Canon form), A minor
9. Erinnerung (4 November 1847) (Remembrance), A major (dedicated to Felix Mendelssohn)
10. Fremder Mann (Stranger), D minor
11. ⁂ (untitled), F major
12. Kriegslied (Song of war), D major
13. Scheherazade, A minor
14. Weinlesezeit – fröhliche Zeit! (Harvest time – happy time!), E major
15. Thema (Theme), C major
16. Mignon, E♭ major
17. Lied italienischer Marinari (Italian mariners' song), G minor
18. Matrosenlied (Sailors' song), G minor
19. Winterzeit I (Wintertime I), C minor (sometimes considered one piece with Wintertime II)
20. Winterzeit II (Wintertime II), C minor/C major
21. Kleine Fuge (Little fugue), A major
22. Nordisches Lied (Nordic Song – Salute to G.), F major (dedicated to Niels Gade; it is based on the cryptogram G-A-D-E)
23. Figurierter Choral (Figured chorale), F major
24. Sylvesterlied (New Year's Eve song), A major

== Appendix (selection) ==
More pieces have been identified from various manuscripts; these are not formally numbered and are denoted as pieces from the appendix (German: Anhang).

- Soldatenmarsch (Soldiers' March, Clara Schumann version)
- Wilder Reiter (The Wild Horseman, alternate version)
- Für ganz Kleinem (For the very young)
- Puppenschlafliedchen (Dolls' lullaby)
- Canone "Aus ist der Schmaus, die Gäste gehn nach Haus" (Canon "The feast is over, the guests go home")
- Auf der Gondel (On the gondola)
- Linke Hand, soll sich auch zeigen (Left hand, should also show itself)
- Gukkuk im Versteck (Cuckoo in hiding)
- Ein Ländler von Franz Schubert (A Ländler by Franz Schubert)
- Ein Thema von Georg Friedrich Händel (A theme by George Frideric Handel)
- Haschemann
- Fest in Tact, im Tone rein, Kanon für Singstimmen (Firmly on the beat, in pure intonation, canon for voices)
- Ein Stückchen von Johann Sebastian Bach (A piece by Johann Sebastian Bach)
- Ein Trinklied von C. M. von Weber (A drinking song by Carl Maria von Weber)
- Lagune in Venedig (Lagoon in Venice)
- Thema – Beethoven Op. 109 (Theme from Beethoven's op. 109)
- Bärentanz (Bear dance)
- Eine berühmte Melodie von L. van Beethoven (A famous tune by Ludwig van Beethoven)
- Kleiner Walzer (Little waltz)
- Ein Stückchen von Mozart (A piece by Mozart)
- Rebus
- Ein Stückchen von Gluck (A piece by Gluck)
- Ein Stückchen von Beethoven (A piece by Beethoven)
- Fragment, Es Dur (Fragment E-flat major)
- Präludium (Prelude)
- Walzer (Waltz)
- ⁂ (untitled) C Dur (C major)
- ⁂ (untitled) G Dur (G major)
- ⁂ (untitled) A Dur (A major)
