= Marcel Marnat =

French musicologist, journalist and radio producer (1933–2024)

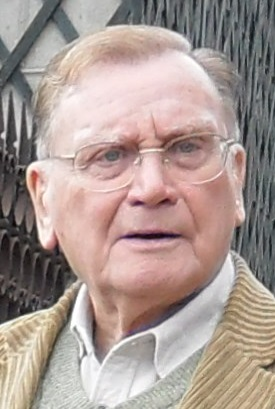
- Marnat in 2011
- Born: 6 July 1933; Lyon, France
- Died: 17 December 2024 (aged 91); Issy-les-Moulineaux, France
- Occupations: Musicologist; Journalist; Radio producer
- Organizations: France Musique

Marcel Paul Marnat (6 July 1933 – 17 December 2024) was a French musicologist, journalist and radio producer, responsible for the programme of France Musique from 1978 to 1992. His works on Maurice Ravel and Giacomo Puccini have been regarded as landmark books.

== Life and career ==
Marnat was born in the seventh arrondissement of Lyon on 6 July 1933. After a short scientific training in medicine, he began to write, self-taught, for various cultural newspapers and magazines (Combat, Jazz Hot, Arts, Les Lettres Françaises, L'Express, Preuves, Le Monde, Disques, Harmonie, Le Monde de la musique, Nouvelle Revue Française). He wrote on current affairs, art, cinema, literature and made lists new discographic publications. He was also secretary of the Ravel Foundation and compiled a catalogue of the works of Maurice Ravel.

Marnat was responsible for programming at France Musique from 1978 to 1992. He worked from 1990 with the Radio Suisse Romande-Espace 2. He was awarded the prize for music criticism. His 2006 book on Giacomo Puccini was honoured by the Académie des Beaux-Arts and received the Prix Pelléas as well as a prize for musical biography of the SACEM at the Deauville book festival. He was a member of the International Music Press Association for many years.

On 30 September 2022, his collection of tribal art was auctioned at the Hôtel Drouot.

Marnat died in Issy-les-Moulineaux on 17 December 2024, at the age of 91.

== Publications ==
- Maurice Ravel, Fayard, 1986
- Haydn, la mesure de son siècle, Fayard, 1995
- Stravinsky, Éditions du Seuil, 1995
- Antonio Vivaldi, Fayard, 2003
- Giacomo Puccini, Fayard, 2006

He also wrote publications about Modest Mussorgsky (1962), Paul Klee (1969), Michelangelo (1974), D. H. Lawrence, and Ludwig van Beethoven.
