= Jane Catulle-Mendès =

French poet

- Jeanne Primitive Mette
- Born: Jeanne Primitive Mette; March 16, 1867; Paris, France
- Died: June 9, 1955 (aged 88)
- Occupations: Poet, playwright, prose writer
- Writing career
- Pen name: Jane Catulle-Mendès
- Genres: Poetry, drama, prose
- Notable awards: Knight and Officer of the Legion of Honour; Knight of the Order of Leopold I of Belgium; Le Prix “Vie heureuse” (1904 recognition)

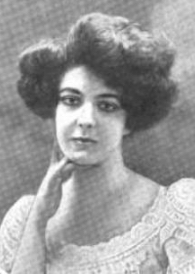
Jane Catulle-Mendes, from a 1906 publication.

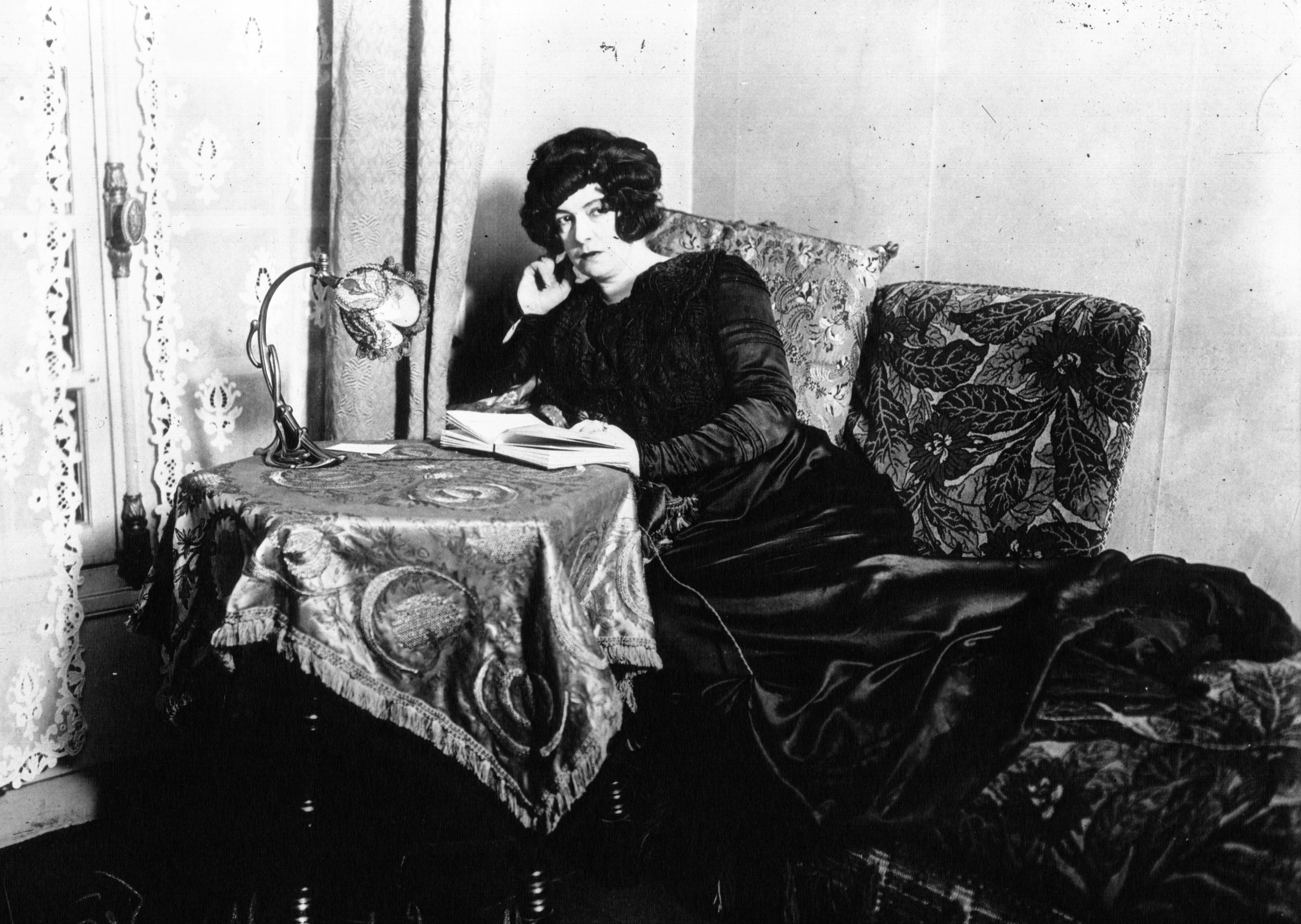
Jeanne Mette reclining next to a table in 1909.

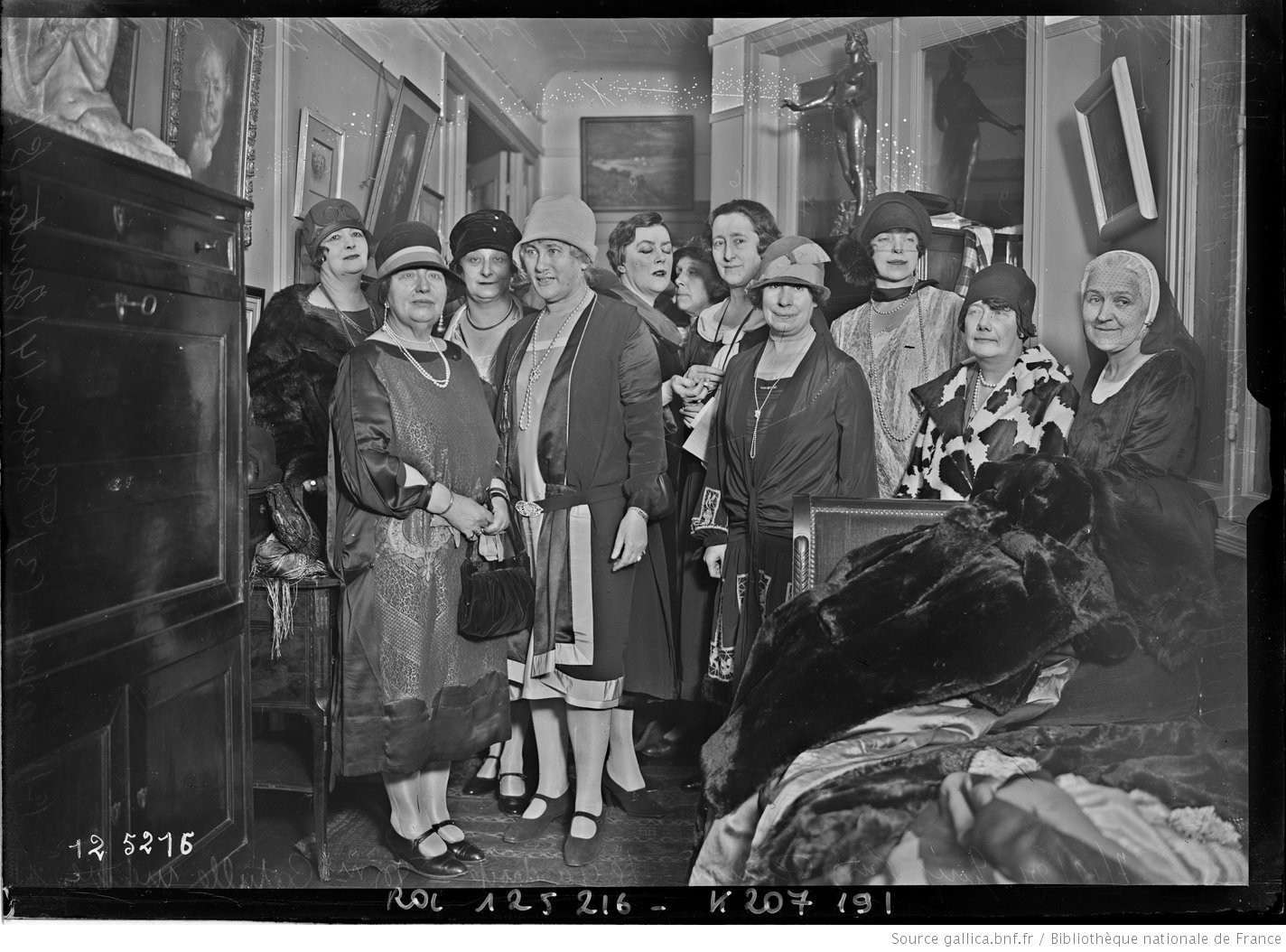
Jury for the Prix Fémina Caroline de Broutelles, 26 rue Vavin, 7 Dec. 1927; from L to R, Mme Catulle Mendès, Vacaresco, F. Gregh, Zanta, Delarue-Mardrus, Judith Cladel, Marcelle Tynaire, An. Corthis, princesse Lucien Murat Colette Yver. Photo: Agence Rol

Jeanne Primitive Mette (16 March 1867 – 9 June 1955), better known under her married name, Jane Catulle-Mendès, was a French poet who also wrote plays and other prose works, and contributed to Pierre Lafitte's Femina.

== Life ==
Jane was born in Paris 16 March 1867, daughter of Célestin Marie Mette and Eugénie Mayer who had married in Neuilly-sur-Seine, Seine (now Hauts-de-Seine), November 18, 1869. She first married Louis Alexandre Boussac, a merchant, with whom 1889 she had a son Marcel. Marcel would become an industrialist tycoon whose holdings included the House of Dior and a highly successful racehorse stud, and who married the singer Fanny Held in 1939.

She and Boussac divorced on 27 June 1895, and she married Symbolist poet Catulle Mendès in Seine-et-Oise, July 8, 1897, who had separated from writer Judith Gautier in 1878 (divorced December 1896). His three daughters, who were portrayed in 1888 by Auguste Renoir, were from his long-running relationship with composer Augusta Holmès. Jane and he, yet to be married, had a son, Jean Primice Catulle Mendès in the 16th arrondissement in Paris on July 10, 1896. In 1898, the couple were contributing subscribers to the completion and installation of Auguste Rodin's Monument to Balzac.

The family lived at 6 quai de Seine in Chatou in 1897; in 1905 at 6 rue du Boccador, Paris; and in 1909 at 160 boulevard Malesherbes in Paris 17th, as well as renting, to spend summers there, a small terrace at 3, rue de Sully, Saint-Germain. On the way home from the latter where he was spending his winter writing, Catulle Mendès died on 8 February 1909, aged sixty-seven, crushed as he stepped, whether by mistake or on purpose is unknown, from the train in the tunnel of the Gare de l'Ouest near Saint-Germain-en-Laye. He is buried in the Montparnasse Cemetery.

Their son Primice died in the lead-up to the second battle of the Marne, on April 23, 1917.

== Writing ==
Recognised in 1904 with membership of the Le Prix “Vie heureuse” founded in that year, the publisher Hachette in its article on the Prize, profiled her work Les Charmes, noting its three parts 'Waiting in the Garden,' a place haunted by poets Lord Byron, Musset, Virgil, her husband Catulle, Villon, Charles d'Orléans, Marguerite de Navarre, Rémy Belleau, Ronsard; Pascal, La Marquise, Aïsse, Baudelaire, Verlaine, Banville, Valmore, Vigny, Hugo; 'The Promised Heart' (love poems); and the 'Alarmed Dream', which introduces new fears. In the first part, in the garden, she writes;

And I give them all my ardent childish
Tenderness... But sometimes, out of all I wildly imagine,
I discover their secret for having heard
In the voices of the garden, the soul of Lamartine

Et je leur donne à tous ma tendresse enfantine
Et grave… Mais parfois, de tout l’être éperdu,
J’ai surpris leur secret pour avoir entendu
Dans les voix du jardin l’âme de Lamartine

The article continues;

We are a little surprised not to find Mallarmé in this company. It seems that Mme Catulle Mendès owes him some beautiful verses. But the most beautiful, no doubt, ... although she has made some that are charmingly crafted, and that others are formed of a vapour finer than the shadow of a dream - the most beautiful are those stripped of all literature, those most simply of her soul. It is amazing that in this passionate poem there is not a cry. The accent is serious, ardent and mingled with a magnificent sadness: clairvoyance is the poetry of love, and one would find nothing more moving there than the sonnet in which she listens to a lover with intoxicated words:

Silently I listen to the poem…
Happy and sorrowful, oh my lover, I know:
You think of love, and it is I who love you.

In 1910 Jane's work was published, along with that of her husband Catulle Mendès, in the international magazine Poesia, founded in Milan in 1905 by Futurist Filippo Tommaso Marinetti.

An unflattering portrayal of her in the Mercure de France in 1911 gave rise to a defamation lawsuit that writer André Rouveyre and the newspaper eventually lost.

During World War 1 Jane was founder of a war charity in Paris and when in New York was invited in June 1915, to give a lecture in French in Pelham Manor, New York at the home of Frederick H. Allen and his wife Adele, whom she had met in Paris when Fred Allen was a lieutenant commander in the Naval Reserves Flying Corps and Adele was the head of the American Committee for Devastated France.

After divorce from Boussac and her marriage to Catulle Mendès, distinguished member of the famous group of poets known as Le Parnasse, Jane had a son, Primice, who was killed on the battlefields of France in 1917 at the age of twenty. Her La Prière sur l'enfant mort (Lemerre, 1921) was written in his memory and details her struggles, using her literary and other connections; she approached Pierre Loti, a Russian general, and head of Russian ambulances, to obtain permission to go and recover his body for a proper burial. On Armisitice Day, 11 November 1918, she wrote in La Prière: "Tears... tears..." adding, "The mere thought of those handsome soldiers, like him, who will be welcomed home in the light of day, makes me collapse..."

In the 1920s she enjoyed a prosperous lifestyle and famous friends, some longstanding, like Sarah Bernhardt who had been the godmother of her son Primice. Louise Faure-Favier, writing in 1927 on "Aviation and Literature" in La Mercure notes her holiday flight, with Pierre Mille and Yvonne Serruys, from Antibes to Ajaccio.

Jane established the Émile Verhaeren prize with money from her son Marcel from her first marriage. She was a contributor to La Muse Française from 1922.

== Honours ==
Jane Catulle-Mendès was appointed knight and officer of the Legion of Honour and Knight of the Order Leopold I of Belgium.

== Works ==
- Les Charmes, E. Fasquelle, Paris, 1904
- Le livre de Cynthia, sonnets (Mercure de France, 1912) Lire en ligne
- Le Cœur magnifique, A. Lemerre, Paris, 1909
- Les Petites confidences chez soi, E. Sansot, Paris, 1911
- Les Sept Filleuls de Janou, intermède héroïque en vers, avec Léon Guillot de Saix, Paris, Sarah-Bernhardt, 21 décembre 1915
- Poèmes des temps heureux, E. Flammarion, Paris, 1924
- France, ma bien aimée, E. Malfère, Amiens, 1925
- Ton amour n'est pas à toi, A. Michel, Paris, 1927
- L'Amant et l'Amour, roman, Baudinière, Paris, 1932
- Sampiero Corso : 1498–1567, Robeur, Paris, 1938
- Poésie et patrie. Le Chef et les siens, A. Michel, Paris, 1945
- La Bataille de Moscou, poème dramatique en un acte avec chœurs, Paris, Salle Pleyel, 25 février 1945
- La Ville merveilleuse, Rio de Janeiro, poèmes, E. Sansot, Paris, s. d.
- At the BNF
