= Catulle Mendès =

French poet and man of letters (1841–1909)

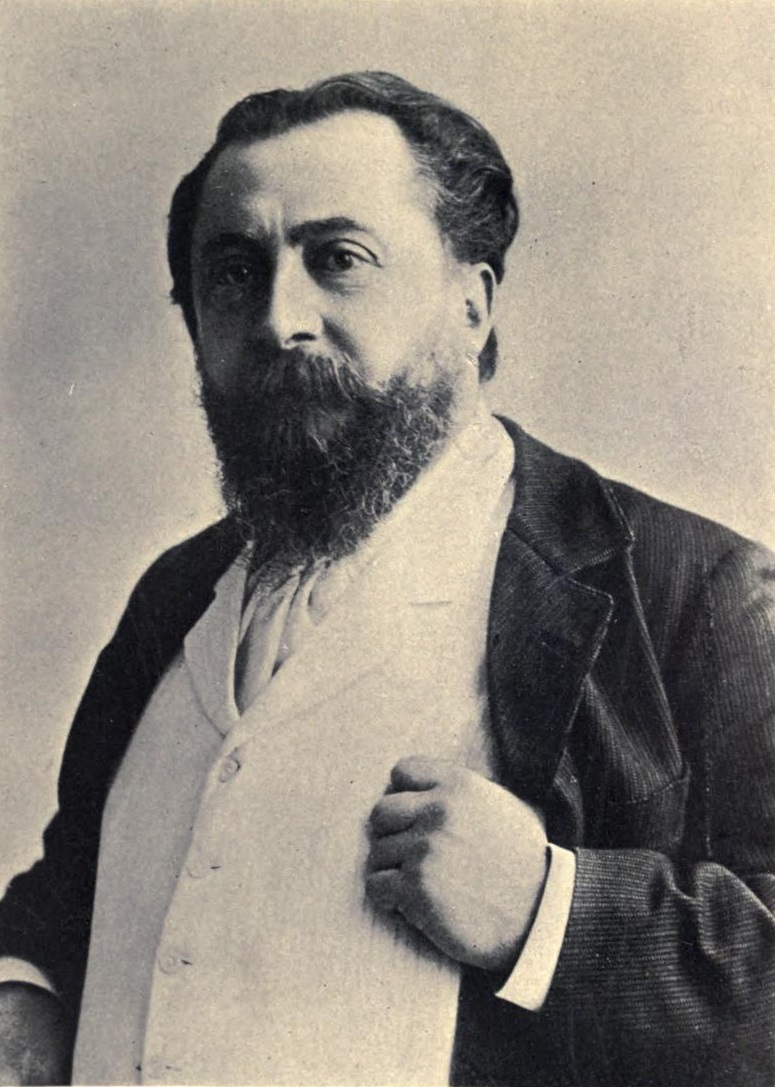
- Born: 22 May 1841; Bordeaux, France
- Died: 8 February 1909 (aged 67); Saint Germain, France
- Occupation: Poet
- Spouses: Judith Gautier; Jeanne Mette
- Partners: Augusta Holmès; (1869 – c. 1886)
- Children: 5
- Relatives: Henri Barbusse (son-in-law)
- Writing career
- Genre: Poetry
- Movement: Parnassianism

Abraham Catulle Mendès (French pronunciation: [katyl mɑ̃dɛs]; 22 May 1841 – 8 February 1909) was a French poet and man of letters. He was associated with the Parnassianist school.

== Early life and career ==
Of Portuguese Jewish extraction, Mendès was born in Bordeaux. After childhood and adolescence in Toulouse, he arrived in Paris in 1859 and quickly became one of the protégés of the poet Théophile Gautier. He promptly attained notoriety with the publication in the La Revue fantaisiste (1861) of his Roman d'une nuit, for which he was condemned to a month's imprisonment and a fine of 500 francs. He was allied with Parnassianism from the beginning of the movement and displayed extraordinary metrical skill in his first volume of poems, Philoméla (1863). His critics have noted that the elegant verse of his later volumes is distinguished rather by dexterous imitation of different writers than by any marked originality. The versatility and fecundity of Mendès' talent is shown in his critical and dramatic writings, including several libretti, and in his novels and short stories. His short stories continue the French tradition of the licentious conte.

In his early period, Mendès sometimes published under the pseudonym Jacques Rollin.

For his contributions and understanding of French literature, Catulle Mendès was nominated by the Minister of Public Instruction and of the Fine Arts to write the history of French poetry from the years 1807-1900. A similar opportunity was previously given to Theophile Gautier.

=== Mendès and The Parnassian Movement ===
Catulle Mendès was a prominent figure in the Parnassian movement, known for his precise style and devotion to the aesthetic ideals that this movement established. He was deeply aligned with the Parnassians’ emphasis on “art for art’s sake” as well as taking on the role of the movement’s chief publicizer and historian. He was able to do this by publishing La Revue fantaisiste in 1861 which published works by Charles Baudelaire and Villiers de L'Isle-Adam, who were prominent Parnassian writers. Mendès also founded the literary journal Le Parnasse contemporain in 1866, which was the flagship anthology of the movement and helped popularize many other Parnassian writers. His poetry exemplified the movement's proclivity for classical themes and emotional restraint, rejecting the elements of Romanticism. He used his influence in the movement to promote its principles and style. Mendès helped define and sustain the Parnassian aesthetic, making him a key figure of the movement and its legacy in French Literature.

== Personal life ==
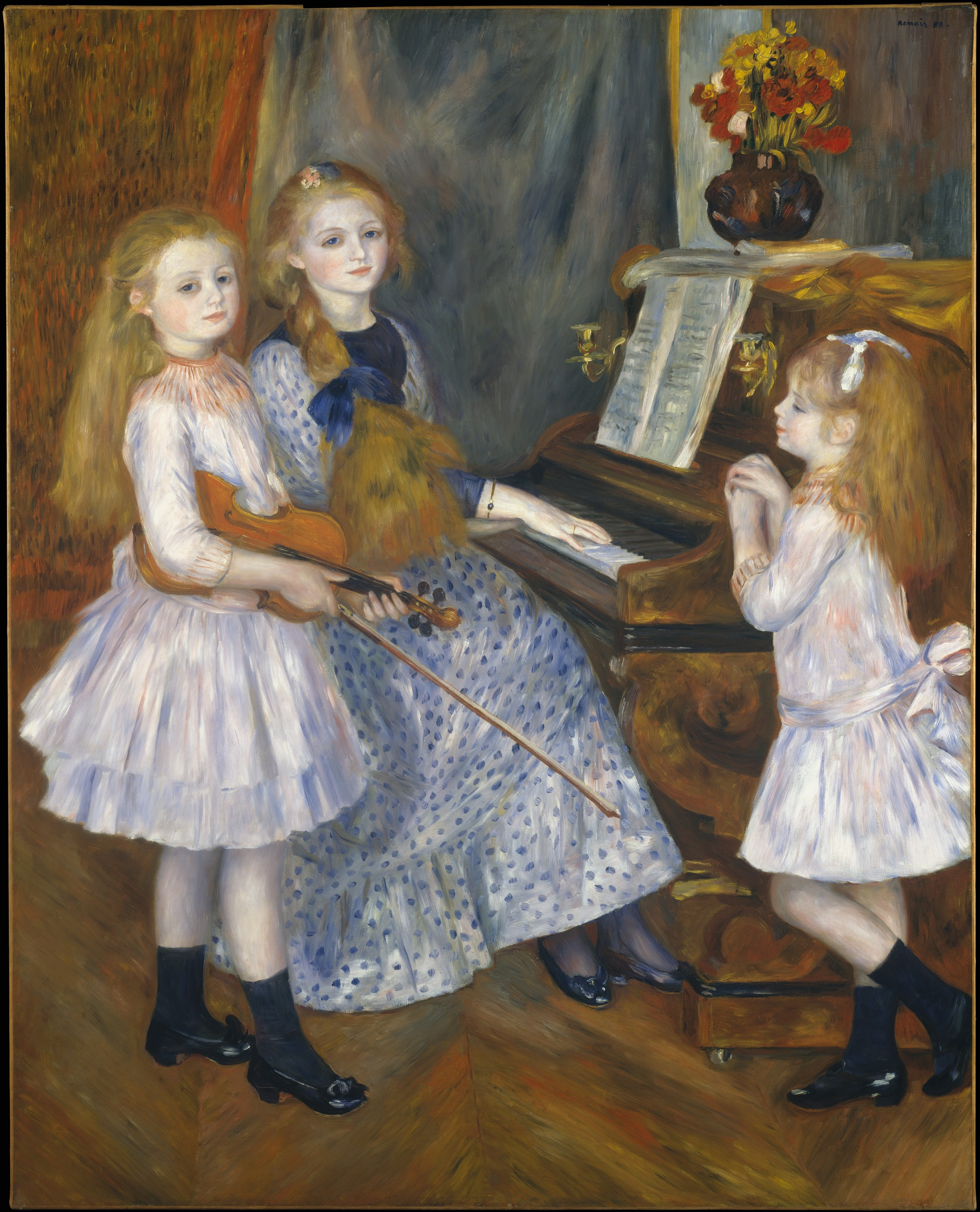
A portrait of Mendès' daughters, Huguette, Claudine, and Helyonne, by Auguste Renoir, 1888, at The Metropolitan Museum of Art

In 1866, Mendès married Judith Gautier, the younger daughter of his mentor Théophile, but later separated.

In 1869, Mendès met the composer Augusta Holmès. Holmès and Mendès later lived together and had three daughters and possibly two sons. The couple's daughters are the subject of the 1888 painting "The Daughters of Catulle Mendès" by Pierre-Auguste Renoir. By 1885, Holmès and Mendès had separated and the children remained in his care. The couple's youngest daughter, Helyonne, married Henri Barbusse in 1898.

Mendès later married the poet Jeanne Mette, who was to be his last companion.

=== Relations and interactions with contemporaries ===
As a central figure in 19th-century French literature, Catulle Mendès garnered a wide network of relationships with the major artists and thinkers of his time. His involvement in overlapping literary movements put him in the middle of aesthetic and ideological innovation. Some of these connections were defined by admiration and collaboration, while others were marked with tension.

- Auguste Villiers de l'Isle-Adam (1838–1889) and Catulle Mendès were colleagues who interacted and influenced one another within the French literary scene. Within his literary journal, La revue fantaisiste (The Fanciful Review), Mendès would cover the works of his contemporaries, including Villiers. Both were devoted to promoting recognition and the excellence of Richard Wagner, often accompanying each other on visits to Wagner's Swiss retreat at Tribschen. The two also shared interest within the literary movements such as Parnassianism, Decadence, and other aesthetic movements.
- Charles Baudelaire (1821-1867), a leading figure in shaping modern French and English art and literature, served as an inspiration to many of the rising writers of the time, including Catulle Mendès. Mendès often published and addressed Baudelaire's content within his literary article. While Baudelaire's magnum opus, Les Fleurs du mal, explores themes of eroticism, beauty, addiction, and death with moral ambiguity and aesthetic complexity, Mendès recycles these same themes through a different lens. He imposes a moralistic and judgmental stance rather than embracing decadence in the same tone as Baudelaire did.
- Jules Huret (1863-1915) was a prominent french journalist who was recognized for his interviews with writers. A duel took place between journalist Jules Huret and writer Catulle Mendès. The conflict arose following a paragraph published under Huret's signature in the Petite Chronique des Lettres, in which the names of Mendès and Oscar Wilde were mentioned in connection. The duel was fought with swords, and Mendès sustained a slight wound. In total, Mendès had fought in an estimated 13 duels.
- Richard Wagner (1813-1883), the revolutionary German composer and artist, left a lasting impact not only on music, but also on 19th-century literature and aesthetics. His dramatic operas, being his most renowned artistic contributions, inspired a generation of writers across Europe, including Catulle Mendès. Mendès was one of the first and most prominent devoted French literary Wagnerians, who worked alongside Villiers de I'lsle-Adam to expose his work and establish it's exceptionality. In 1869, Mendès traveled to Wagner's Swiss retreat at Tribschen, marking the transition from admirer to a friendship. However, the outbreak of the Franco-Prussian War (1870) interrupted their bond. Wagner's resentful anti-French rhetoric during this conflict would offend Mendès, leading to a temporary split. As Mendès later stated in his memoirs, it would take time for the conflict to settle between the two.

=== Death ===
Early on the morning of 8 February 1909, the body of Mendès was discovered in the railway tunnel of Saint Germain. He had left Paris by the midnight train on the 7th, and it is supposed that, thinking he had arrived at the station, he had opened the door of his compartment while still in the tunnel, although some biographers have suggested suicide. Other speculations about his death came from newspaper articles claiming it had been a robbery-homicide. His body was interred at the Montparnasse Cemetery.

== Works ==
=== Collections of short-stories ===
- Number 56 and Other Stories (1895), which contains the novellas Number 56, A Wayside Village, The Cough, and his infamous Luscignole, a grotesque thriller concerning a sadistic dwarf and his young hostage. Number 56 is a thought-provoking detective tale based on a real life murder case, while the remaining stories are dark fantasies, nightmarish and hallucinatory, told in the fashion of Edgar Allan Poe of whom Mendès was greatly enamored. To this day, Luscignole is considered Mendès' finest, most original work of fiction. First English translation 1928.
- The Fairy Spinning Wheel and the Tales it Spun (1899), a collection of fairy-tales rewritten in Mendès' own style.

=== Collections of poetry ===
- Philoméla (1863)
- Poésies, première série (1876), which includes much of his earlier verse
- Soirs moroses, Contes épiques, Philoméla, etc.; Poésies (7 vols., 1885), a new edition largely augmented
- Les Poésies de Catulle Mendès (3 vols., 1892)
- Nouveaux Contes de Jadis (1893), Editeur Paul Ollendorff, Paris
- La Grive des vignes (1895)

A Master's Thesis written by John Jex Martin for the Loyola University Chicago in 1940 talks about Catulle Mendès, in a critical study. His first volume of verse was Philoméla, published in 1863 by Hetzel. It contained around 40 poems. The doctrines of the Parnassians were yet to be manifested, but the forms and ideas were all contained in the book. Also included are 23 sonnets and it affects the mood of tranquility at which Mendès aimed. Together the sonnets have a classical perfection, but individually they have imperfections. In this volume, the most finished poems and the one with inspiration, is an ode, Ariane. Philoméla had a noticeable success among critics. His second volume of verses was published in 1872. Two of his finest poems were Penthésilée and l'Enfant Krichna. Both were imitations of Leconte de Lisle. His third volume, Hesperus was published in 1872 by Jouaust. It was more of the romanticism implicit in the Contes épiques. Similar in style of mystery and isolation of Hesperus, the Soleille de Minuit was completed in April 1875 and a year later it appeared in the third series of Parnasse contemporain.

=== For theatre ===
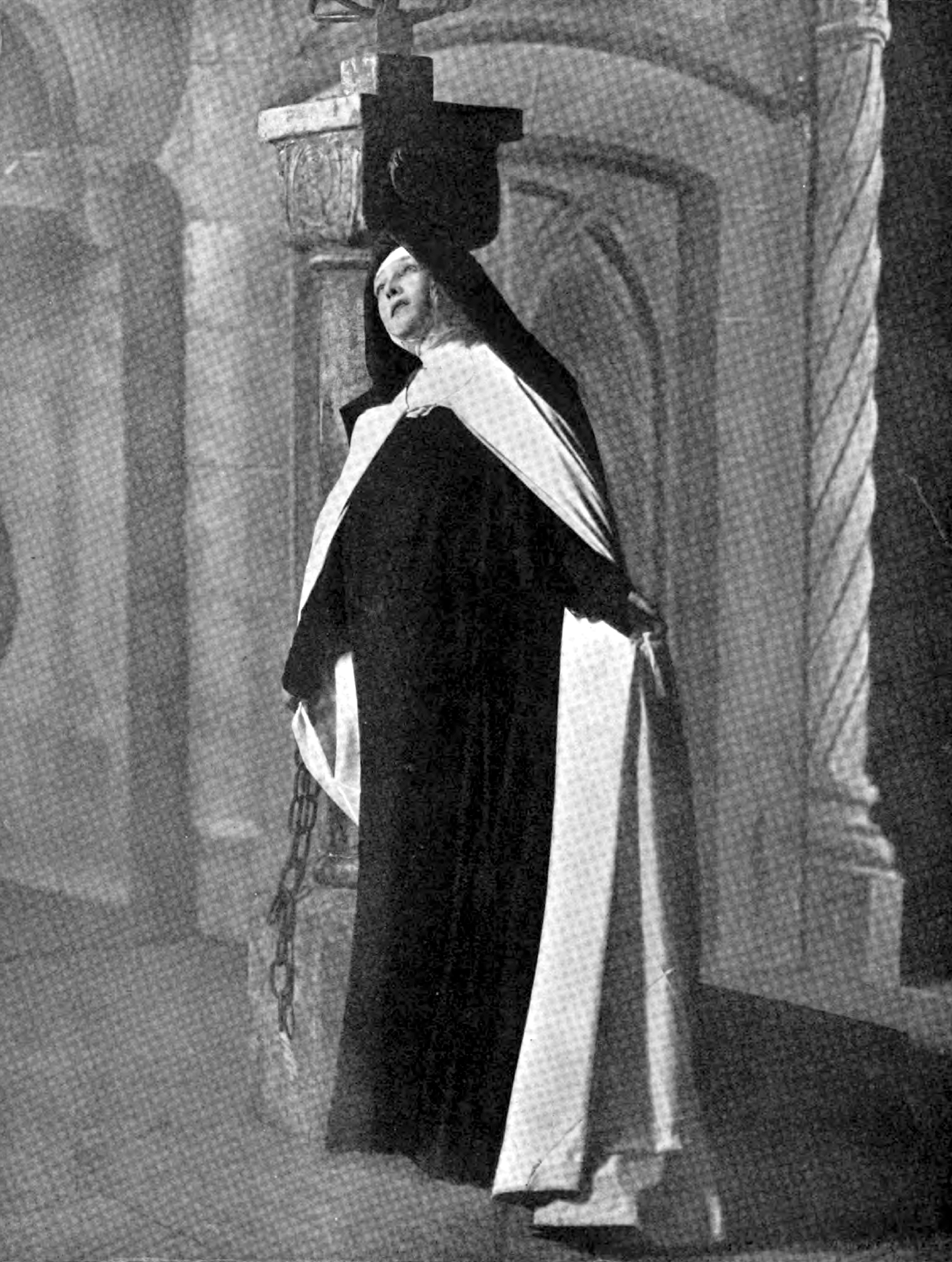
Sarah Bernhardt as St. Theresa in La Vierge d'Avila (1906)

- La Part du roi (1872), a one-act verse comedy
- Les Frères d'armes (1873), drama
- Justice (1877), in three acts, characterized by a hostile critic as a hymn in praise of suicide
- Le Capitaine Fracasse (1878), libretto of a light opera, based on Théophile Gautier's novel
- Gwendoline (1886) and Briséïs (first performed 1897), for the music of Chabrier
- La Femme de Tabarin (1887)
- Isoline (1888), for the music of Messager
- Le Collier de Saphirs (1891), Pantomime in two tableaux, music by Gabriel Pierné
- Le Docteur Blanc (1893), Mimodrame Fantastique in one act, music by Gabriel Pierné
- Médée (1898), in three acts and in verse
- La Reine Fiammette (1898), a conte dramatique in six acts and in verse, set in Renaissance Italy, later set to music by Xavier Leroux, for which see: La reine Fiammette
- Le Cygne (1899), for the music of Lecocq
- La Carmélite (1902), for the music of Reynaldo Hahn
- Le Fils de l'étoile (1904), the hero of which is Bar Kokhba, the Syrian pseudo-Messiah, for the music of Camille Erlanger
- Scarron (1905)
- Ariane (1906) and Bacchus (1909), for the music of Jules Massenet
- Glatigny (1906)
- La Vierge d'Avila (1906), for Sarah Bernhardt

In the same year, Catulle Mendès wrote in Le Figaro that it was after reading Gobineau's Les Religions et les Philosophies dans d´Asie centrale (The religions and philosophies of central Asia) that he had the idea to write a drama about the first woman disciple of the Báb: the Persian erudite and illustrious poet Táhirih.

When it comes to his theater work, La Femme de Tabarin was the most successful comedy, and for its first performance, it was presented at the Theatre Libre of Antoine in November 1887. But it was published in 1874. Mendès was hesitant to allow it to be performed, believing it might offend some of the critics. Mendès created a libretto of five acts for an opera called Ariane in 1906. It had a mix of classical legend and material of his own invention. It was written upon request from the composer Jules Massenet. With the success of Ariane, Mendès and Massenet worked together on another opera called Bacchus.

=== Critical works ===
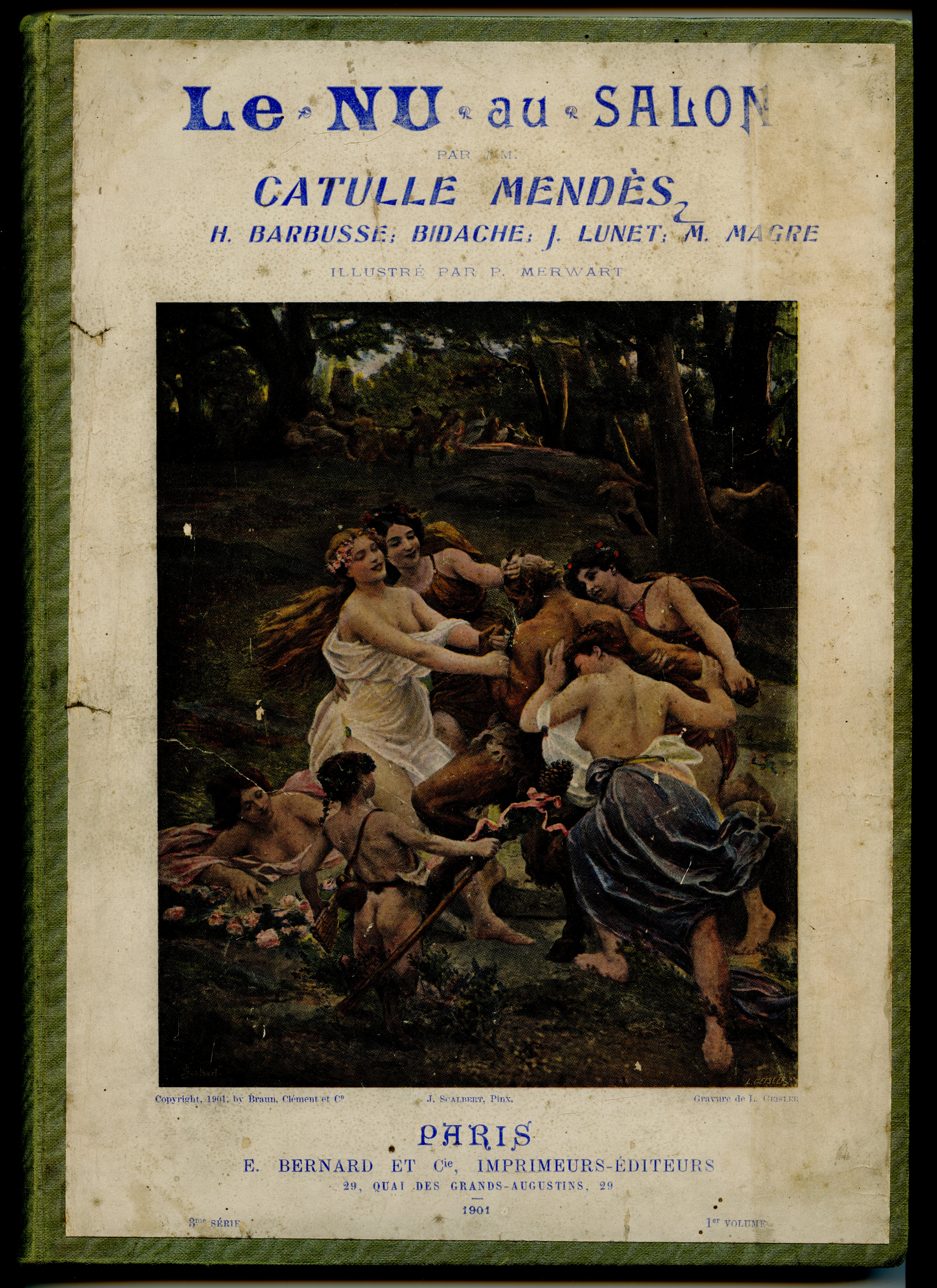
Le NU au SALON , 1900 (published in 1901). The cover image is of a painting by Jules Scalbert, gravure de Louis Geisler.

- Richard Wagner (1886)
- L'Art au théâtre (3 vols; 1896–1900), a series of dramatic criticisms reprinted from newspapers
- A report addressed to the minister of public instruction and of the fine arts on Le Mouvement poétique francais de 1867 à 1900 (new ed., 1903), which includes a bibliographical and critical dictionary of the French poets of the 19th century.

=== Novels ===
- Zo'har (1886), a story of incest in which the woman is virile and the man is feeble
- Le Roi vierge (1880) in which he introduces Louis II of Bavaria and Richard Wagner
- L'Homme tout nu (1887)
- Méphistophéla (1890)
- La Maison de la vielle (1894)
- Gog (1897)
- Le Chercheur de tares (1898)

=== Documents ===
- L'Évangile de la jeunesse de Notre-Seigneur Jésus-Christ d'apres S. Pierre mis en français par Catulle Mendès après le manuscrit de l'Abbaye de Saint Wolfgang (1894). Presented as a lost Latin document from the abbey of St. Wolfgang im Salzkammergut, with a translation by Mendès into French, although considered by most to have been a literary forgery entirely written by Mendès.

=== Books in English ===
- Mendès, Catulle (2007). Bluebirds. Translated by Stableford, Brian. Snuggly Books. ISBN 9781943813254.

=== Musical collaboration ===
- One of Mendès's most interesting collaborations was with a French composer (and his partner for some seventeen years) named Augusta Holmès. They created a piece a music that was of the same title of one of Mendès's poem called Chanson in 1874. Holmès treated Mendès’s poem as a conversation because not only the music just echoed the poem, but it also responded to it. She used changes in rhythm and harmony to highlight different emotions and meanings in the text. This kind of back-and-forth between words and music was typical of the time, especially in the French art song tradition where music and literature were closely connected.
- Another collaboration that was worth mentioning was with Ignacy Jan Paderewski. The two met in 1902 when Mendès worked on a French translation of Paderewski’s opera Manru. The translation led Paderewski to explore more of Mendès’s writing. In 1903, he composed a set of twelve songs called Douze Mélodies sur des poésies de Catulle Mendès was published as his Opus 22. Paderewski chose Mendès’s poems partly because he admired French literature and wanted to connect with the artistic world of Paris. The poems came from Mendès’s collections Sérénades and Sonnets. They gave Paderewski a wide emotional range to work with. Each song represents a unique mood just like the poems themselves. While many composers were drawn to Mendès for his beautiful and lyrical language, Paderewski stood out by mixing French musical styles with his own personal voice. This project helped Paderewski grow as a composer of art songs and showed how Mendès’s poetry could inspire music that reached beyond French borders.

== Critical reception ==
Catulle Mendès's literary reputation has long been marked by ambivalence, praised for his technical skill but often critiqued for lacking originality or enduring influence. Contemporary and modern critics alike have debated the significance of his contributions to 19th-century French literature.

In a Critical Study, John Jex Martin compiled contemporary assessments of Mendès’s oeuvre. He cited Louis Thomas de Miomandre’s description of Mendès as “irréductible,” highlighting the author’s perceived “crass independence”—a refusal to align with dominant literary schools or movements. While this independence afforded Mendès a certain stylistic freedom, it also isolated him from more innovative currents in late-19th-century French literature.

André Gide, a towering literary figure of the early 20th century, famously dismissed Mendès’s influence, stating that he had “no literary influence at all.” This assertion, coming from a key figure in French modernism, signaled a broader shift away from Mendès’s ornate and classical style, which many saw as an echo of earlier Romantic and Parnassian aesthetics.

Despite such criticism, Mendès was respected in his time for his prolific output and craftsmanship. Rosine Mellé, in The Contemporary French Writers, wrote that Mendès demonstrated a “great predilection for sad subjects” and had “a special fondness for melancholy and tears.” She also noted the musicality of his language, describing his verse as full of “charm” and lyrical precision. These traits helped secure his place within the French Decadent movement, whose emphasis on emotional depth, aestheticism, and morbid beauty aligned well with Mendès’s thematic concerns.

Later scholarship has tended to focus less on Mendès’s influence and more on his role as a central figure in the fin-de-siècle literary ecosystem—a consummate writer, critic, and promoter of the arts. While rarely included in the modern canon, his work offers insight into the literary tastes and tensions of the late 19th century.
