= Marcel Jambon =

Marcel Jambon by the Nadar studio (Paris, BnF).

Marcel Jambon (19 October 1848 – 30 September 1908) was a French decorative painter and set designer for operas. His pupils included Paul Charlemagne.

His work at the opéra de Paris is commemorated by a portrait bust by Léopold Bernstamm, unveiled in 1910 by Étienne Dujardin-Beaumetz, Broussan and Cassieur-Bernard.

== Life ==
A son of Marcel Jambon and Suzanne Victoire Lamothe, he was born in Barbezieux-Saint-Hilaire and studied under the decorative painter Auguste Alfred Rubé, becoming his associate in 1861. et Chaperon, de 1887 à 1892.

In 1870 he fought in the Franco-Prussian War and won the Médaille militaire. As of 1876 he was living at 15 rue Réaumur in the 3rd arrondissement of Paris.

In 1889 he was awarded the croix d'honneur for decorating the 'Habitation humaine' of Charles Garnier at the 1889 Exposition Universelle. In 1894 he was living at 39 Rue Manin in the 19th arrondissement of Paris, where he lived until he died. On Rubé's death in 1899 he founded a studio at 73 rue Secrétan, also in the 19th arrondissement.

He worked with his relation Alexandre Bailly. In 1889 he was made a Knight in the Legion of Honour, before being promoted to Officer in the same order in 1901. · He took part in painting the new decorative scheme of the Comédie-Française in 1900 after a fire there. ·

== Œuvre ==
In his time he was considered one of the best decorative painters. He produced several works that were praised at the 1889 Exposition universelle. His theatre set designs included ones for La Walkyrie and Tannhäuser by Richard Wagner, La Maladetta by Paul Vidal, L'Attaque du moulin by Alfred Bruneau and Falstaff by Giuseppe Verdi.

In 1896 he was made head of the decorative studio for the Opéra de Paris – this was sited on boulevard Berthier. He worked in particular on a tramline connecting the Opéra's store to the Opéra on which scenery could be transported. He also produced several set designs for the Opéra, including for Armide, La Statue, L'Enlèvement au sérail, Tristan et Isolde and in 1895 for La Montagne noire by Augusta Holmès.

Set design by Jambon for La Montagne noire by Augusta Holmès (photo Benque & Cie)

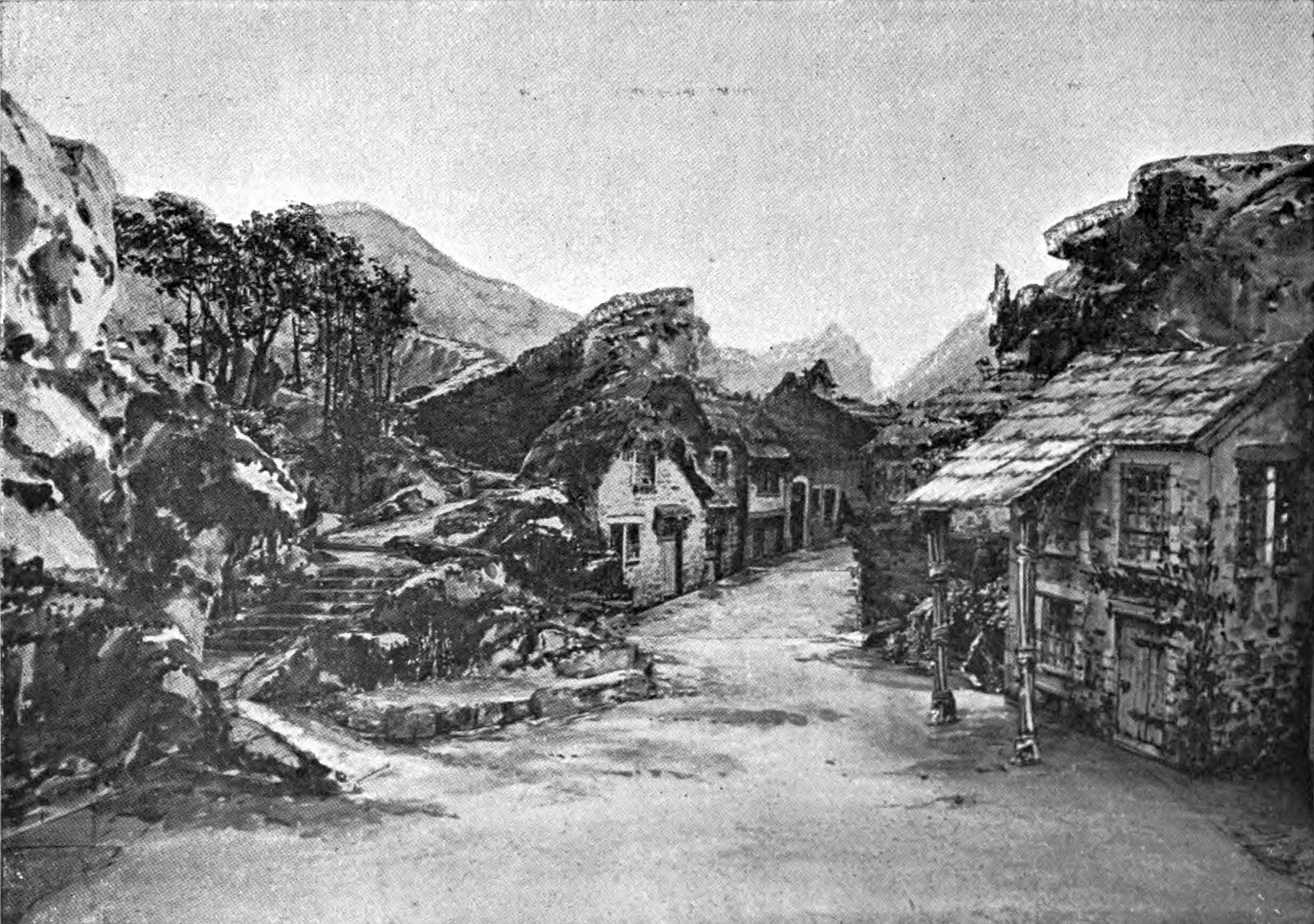
A Mountain Village, design by Jambon for the third act of La Montagne noire (photo H. Laffargue).

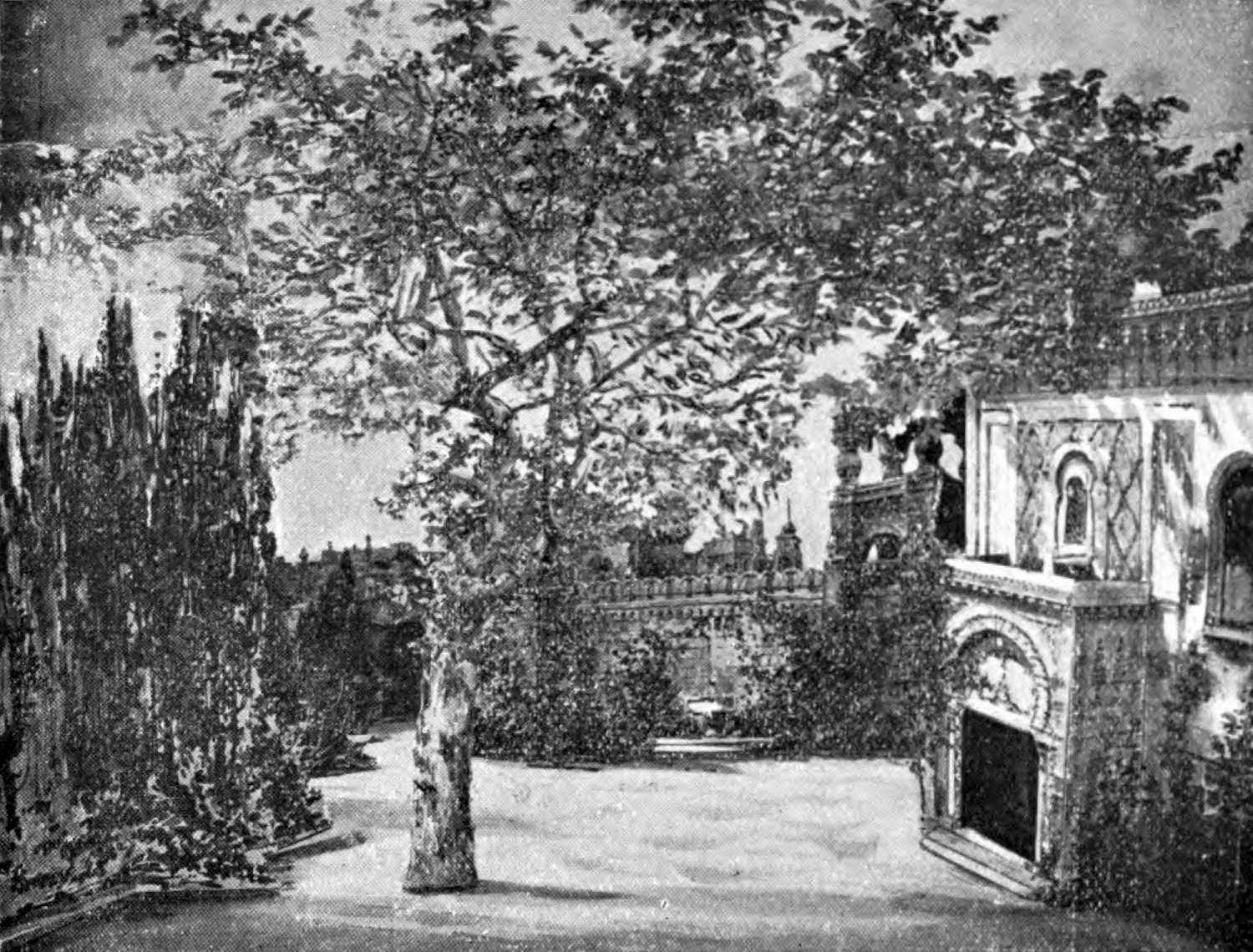
A Town on the Border of Turkey — The Palace of Yamina, design by Jambon for the fourth act of La Montagne noire (photo H. Laffargue).

For the Opéra-Comique he designed sets for La Carmélite, L'Enfant roi and Les Pêcheurs de Saint-Jean. In 1896, he collaborated with Auguste Alfred Rubé, Charles Moisson et Eugène Carpezat on sets for Cendrillon by Jules Massenet. At the Comédie Française he designed sets for Gertrude, Les Phéniciennes and Don Quichotte.

He also worked for the Odéon, the Theatre Sarah-Bernhardt, the Théâtre de l'Ambigu-Comique, the Théâtre du Châtelet, the arènes de Béziers and produced designs for Prométhée, Parysatis, Armide and Les Hérétiques. From January 1900 to July 1906 he worked on 482 designs and a total of 165000 m² of canvas.

In 1900 he produced a large number of friezes for the palais des Beaux-Arts, the palais des Armées de terre et de mer, the palais du Génie civil and the palais de la Mécanique at the Exposition Universelle. He also designed the Trans-Siberian Railway Panorama for the Compagnie des wagons-lits as well as the Chars du champagne, de l'Allemagne et des vins étrangers for the Syndicat des vins.

In 1901 the Centre national des arts plastiques commissioned eight half-moon decorative paintings from him, collectively titled Arts and Crafts, now stored in Nancy at the hôtel de préfecture de Meurthe-et-Moselle.

His studio and that of Lucien Jusseaume also produced sets for film studios during the silent era, notably for Le Film d'Art. He worked on the decor of the café and buffet at the gare Paris-Lyon-Méditerranée, of the salle des fêtes at the hôtel de préfecture for Meurthe-et-Moselle à Nancy, and on panoramas for international exhibitions.

He also restored paintings at the château de Malmaison. One of his pre-show curtains is now a monument historique held at the château de Barbezieux

== Bibliography (in French) ==
- Alexandra Bellot, 'La conception du décor de théâtre et d'opéra à travers l’œuvre du peintre décorateur Marcel Jambon (1848–1908)' (art history MA thesis), Poitiers, 2011
- Heugel, Henri; Schlesinger, Léon, eds. (2 August 1896), "Nouvelles diverses", Le Ménestrel, no. 31, Heugel, pp. 247–248
