= Portrait of Doctor Rey =

1889 painting by Vincent van Gogh

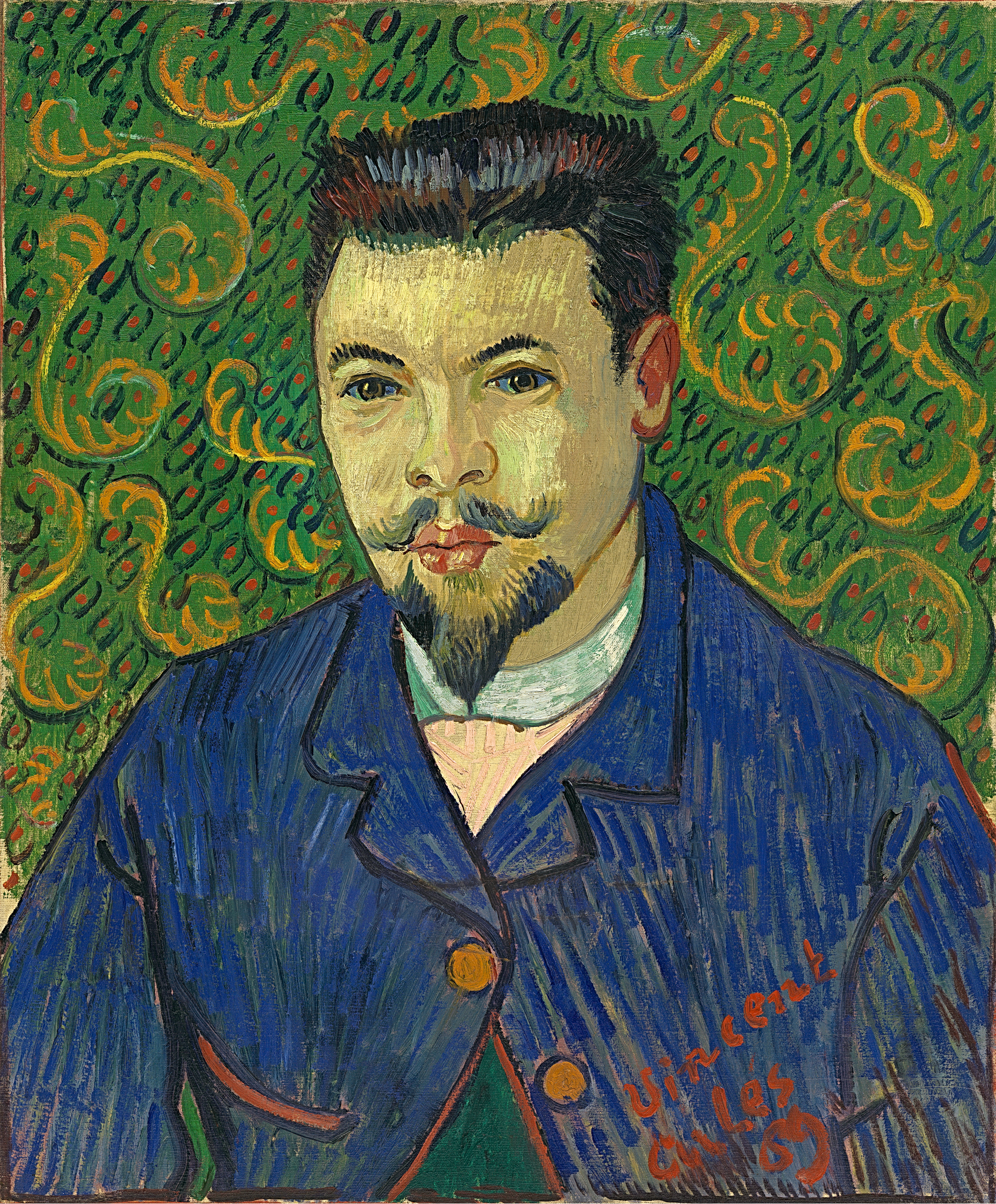
- Artist: Vincent van Gogh
- Year: January 1889
- Catalogue: F500; JH1659
- Medium: oil on canvas
- Dimensions: 64 cm × 53 cm (25 in × 21 in)
- Location: Pushkin Museum; Moscow

Portrait of Doctor Rey is an oil on canvas painting by Vincent van Gogh, produced at Arles, probably between 7 and 17 January 1889, falling between his departure from hospital on the former date and letter 571 to his brother Theo on the latter date which mentions giving the work to its subject as a keepsake. It shows his 'Japanising' style of that period and is now in the Pushkin Museum, in Moscow.

== Background ==
It shows Félix Rey, a doctor at Arles' hospital, who healed the artist following the fit of epilepsy or dementia in which he cut off part of his ear. Rey and his family found it ridiculous and unrealistic and so used it for over ten years to block a hole in a chicken coop, then probably put it in their loft. In April 1901, the future painter Charles Camoin was billeted at Arles as part of France's 55th Line Infantry Regiment. There he met Rey, who told him about the painting and sold it to him, with Camoin sending it to an art dealer from Marseille, Monsieur Molinard. A few weeks later, not having found a buyer, the painting was transferred to Ambroise Vollard, an art dealer friend of Camoin in Paris. He managed to find a buyer, but only for 150 francs. The work was at that time called "Framed portrait of a man, full face slightly turned to the right, signed in red : Vincent, Arles, January 1889".

The painting then disappears from the record until 1908, when it was sold again, this time by the Cassirer gallery in Berlin, run by Bruno Cassirer, then by Eugène Druet in Paris, with the latter selling it on later in 1908 to Sergei Shchukin for 4600 francs. The work was seized by the Soviet state after the October Revolution but its subject's identity had been lost and it was only research by Jacob Baart de la Faille whilst writing a biography and catalogue raisonné of van Gogh's work which in 1924 reidentified Rey as the subject.
