= Eugène Druet =

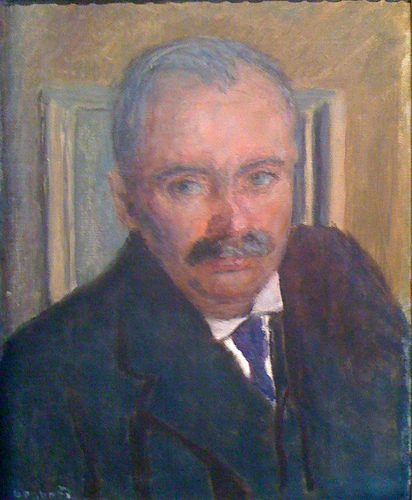
1912 portrait of Druet by Pierre Bonnard (musée Maurice Denis, Saint-Germain-en-Laye).

Eugène Druet (26 June 1867 – 21 January 1916) was a French photographer and art dealer.

== Life ==
He was born at 206 rue du Faubourg-Saint-Martin in Paris to Eugène Alphonse Druet and Alphonine Augustine Herbinière, then grocers. He initially rented and ran Yacht Club français, a small family café at place de l'Alma (now avenue du Président-Wilson) which he bought in 1893. Auguste Rodin's Dépôt des marbres studio at 182 rue de l'Université was not far from 'Druet's café, and the sculptor regularly came to the latter and introduced him to the photography of art.

After meeting Rodin in 1896, Druet produced several photographs of Rodin's sculptures and often acted as his official photographer. According to Hélène Pinet it is unclear why Rodin chose Druet but he may simply have been impressed by the amateur photographs Druet showed him. They worked together until 1900, when they little by little grew apart, notably because Druet was almost never paid for his voluntary work for Rodin. 1900 also saw Rodin's major retrospective at the pavillon de l'Alma during the Exposition universelle – it was almost entirely organised by Druet and included a section with 71 of his photographs.

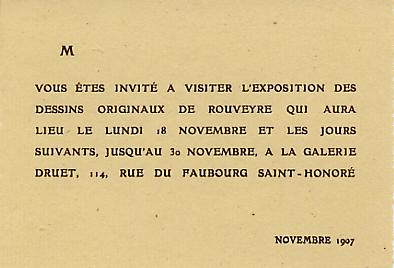
Invitation to the exhibition of drawings by André Rouveyre at the galerie E. Druet, 1907.

On Rodin's advice Druet abandoned his café to open an art gallery at 114 rue du Faubourg-Saint-Honoré in 1903, moving to 20 rue Royale in 1908. It soon became well-known and is mentioned in chapter three of Gertrude Stein's Autobiography of Alice B. Toklas :

on the other side of Paris, on rue du Faubourg-Saint-Honoré, was based the former restaurant owner and photographer Druet.

His rich clients included Russian Ivan Morozov. In 1908 he was made an Officier de l'Instruction publique.

He continued to photograph art, especially paintings. He thus sold paintings and his own photographs in his gallery. This idea to sell reproductions of paintings which he was exhibiting allowed him to make extra profits. Guillaume Apollinaire wrote that the photographs at the galerie Druet "reproduce in a completely satisfactory way famous paintings from Leonardo da Vinci to Maurice Denis via Titian, Ingres, Toulouse-Lautrec and Cézanne". he became recognised in art circles – for example, on 2 March 1913 he assisted in the major auction of works from the La peau de l'ours collection in rooms 7 and 8 of the hôtel Drouot, where he acted as an expert alongside Josse and Gaston Bernheim-Jeune.

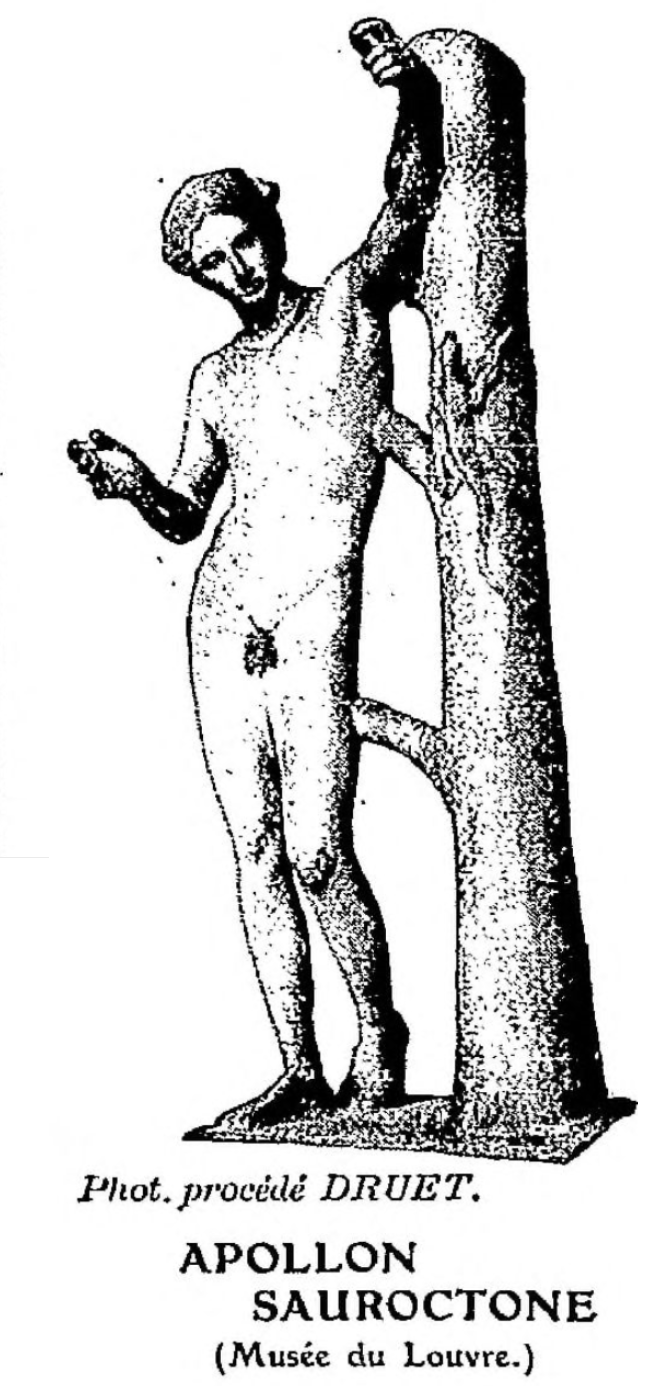
Apollo Sauroktonos, reproduction in the magazine Touche à tout, photographed using the Druet process.

Between 1903 and 1938 his gallery exhibited nearly 1300 artists, including Georges Manzana-Pissarro, Charles Camoin, Henri Manguin, Théo van Rysselberghe, Odilon Redon Albert Marquet, Léon Lehmann, Maurice Denis, Jacqueline Marval, Paul Cézanne, Fernand Labat, Jules Cavaillès, Jean Fernand-Trochain and Maurice Georges Poncelet.

He died in Paris of brain congestion in 1916. after his death his wife ran the gallery until 1938, when it closed. His archive of 30,000 plates were bought by François Antoine Vizzavona, himself a photographer of art and publisher.

== As a photographer ==
Druet used Lumière autochrome plates to produce some of his photographs. He mostly used the 9.12 cm formats, but also the 13.18 cm and 18.24 cm. His talent even gave his name to the Druet process.

Initially his production essentially consisted of photographs of Rodin's works from life. The art critic Claude Anet stated that they "not only reproduce all the delicacy of the model, the beauty of their plans and lines, but also [...] the power of evoking the works themselves". Next he produced a series of photographs of Vincent van Gogh's paintings around the time they were starting to become famous (L'Arlésienne, Jardin à Auvers, Portrait du docteur Gachet). This series contributed to spreading knowledge of van Gogh's work. He also produced a series of photographs of the dancer Vaslav Nijinski on 19 June 1910 in the painter Jacques-Émile Blanche's garden.

In a 1908 issue of the Bulletin de la SFP a writer stated "Unlike a very large number of photographers, content with approximations without worrying about the accuracy of values, Monsieur Druet is always concerned with orthochromatism, thus achieving a fidelity of rendering vital in reproducing works of art".

Most of his photographs are preserved at the médiathèque de l'architecture et du patrimoine at fort de Saint-Cyr as the Fonds Druet-Vizzavona, which holds around 150,000 photographic plates and is made up of Druet's collection (30,000 plates) and that of the Vizzanova family, which were merged in 1939.

=== Exhibitions of his work ===
- 1900, Paris, pavillon de l'Alma, with works by Auguste Rodin, with a section for Druet's photographs.
- 16 January 1994 to 6 March 1994, Licht und Schatten. Rodin-Photographien von Eugène Druet, Georg Kolbe Museum, Berlin.
- 14 November 2007 to 2 March 2008, Rodin sous l'œil des photographes, musée Rodin, Paris.
Photographs by Eugène Druet

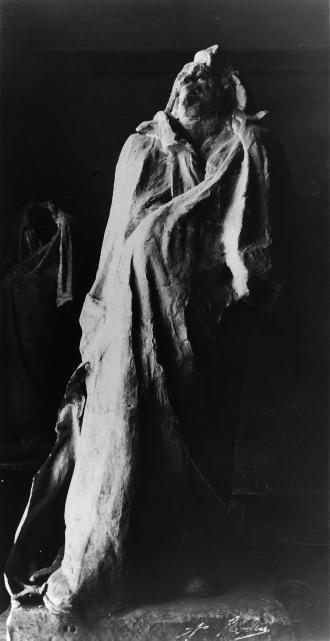
Auguste Rodin, Monument to Balzac.

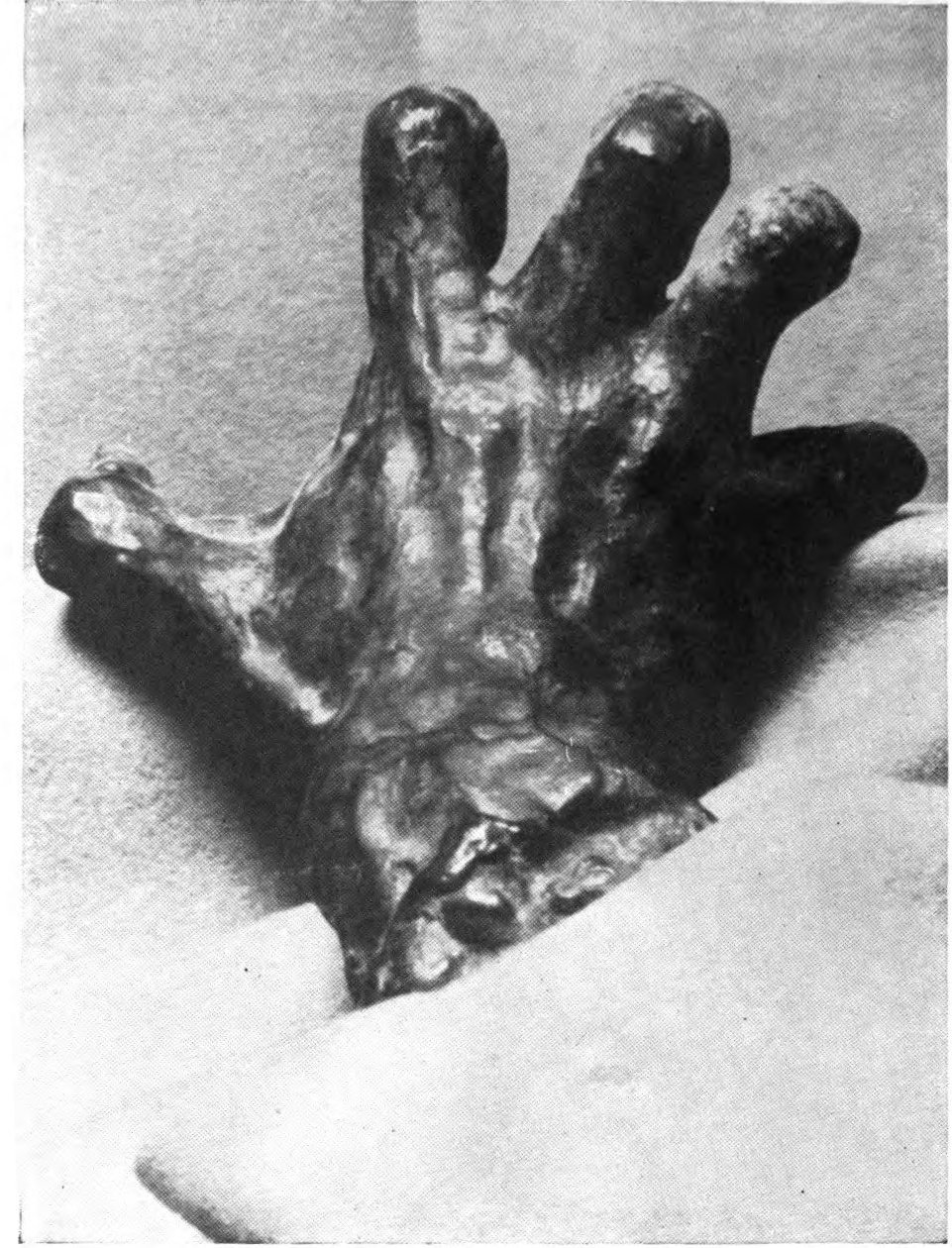
Auguste Rodin, The Bronze Hand

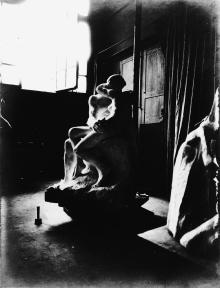
Auguste Rodin, Le Baiser (c. 1898).

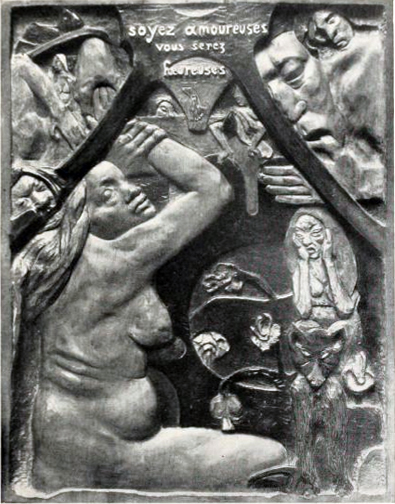
Paul Gauguin, Soyez amoureuses vous serez heureuses.

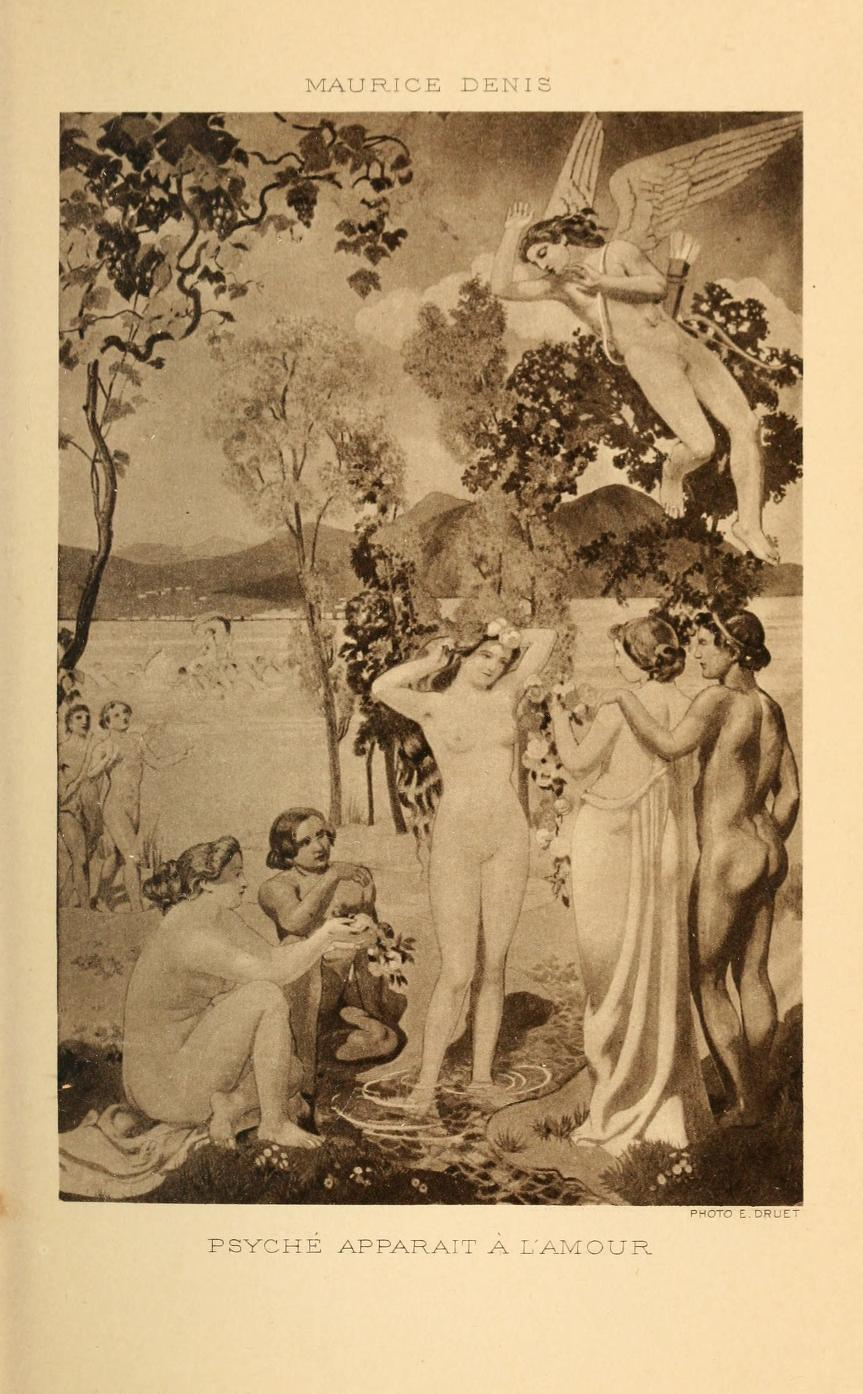
Maurice Denis, Psyche Appears to Cupid.

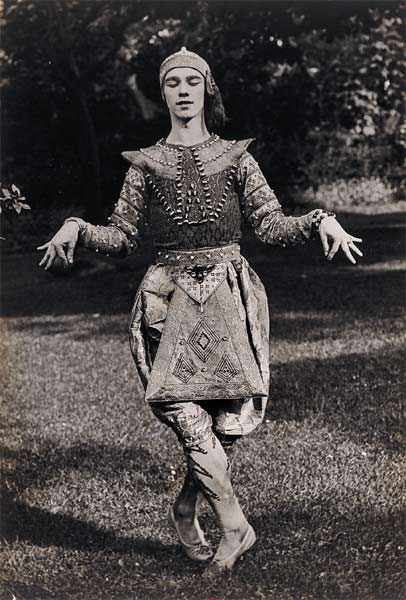
Vaslav Nijinsky in the Siamese dance from Orientales (1910).

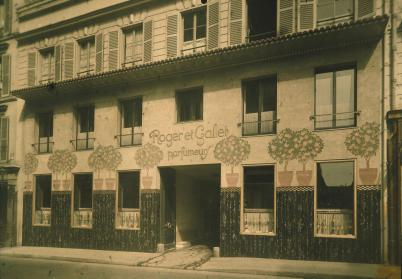
Façade of Roger & Gallet in Paris.

== Selected exhibitions at the galerie Druet ==
Dates	Year(s)	Artist(s)	Notes
5–16 November	1903	Théo van Rysselberghe	
November–December	1903	Maurice Denis, Paul Sérusier, Ker-Xavier Roussel, Armand Seguin, Maximilien Luce, Henri-Edmond Cross & Albert Clouard	
22 November – 10 December	1904	Maurice Denis	Catalogue with a preface by André Gide
	1905	Théo van Rysselberghe	
January–February	1905	Berthe Morisot.	
	1906	Henri Matisse	Major retrospective
18–30 November	1907	André Rouveyre	Original drawings
25 October – 6 November	1909	Vladislav Granzow	
7–19 November	1910	André Lhote	Paintings
27 February – 12 March	1911	Théo van Rysselberghe	Paintings
	1912	Jacqueline Marval	44 paintings, including The Three Roses (1910)
December	1912	Henri Farge	
1–13 December	1913	Jules Flandrin	Paintings
	1913		Publicity for the catalogue for the La peau de l'ours sale, with 16 reproductions
26 January – 7 February	1914	Raoul de Mathan	
9–21 February	1914	Baignières, Desvallières, Dethomas, Dufrénoy, Jules Flandrin, Charles Guérin, Marque, Rouault and Jacqueline Marval	
5–27 March	1917	Henri Valensi	Paintings and drawings of the Dardanelles campaign and of the 1915–1916 campaign in Greece as "painter to the expeditionary corps staff"; as well as being a painter the artist was an animator, film director, art theorician and one of the founders of musicalism.
20–31 January	1919	Lucien Jacques and Joseph Gilardoni	
	1921	Albert Huyot	
Summer	1921	Robert Bevan, Stanisława de Karłowska, Harold Gilman, Edward McKnight Kauffer, John Nash, Edward Wadsworth	Entitled "A Group of English Modern Painters".
November–December	1921	Robert Lotiron	
	1922	Lucien Jacques	
	1922	Lucien Jacques	
	1922	Henri Lebasque	
	1923	Théo van Rysselberghe	
	1923	Odilon Redon	
	1924	Pierre Bonnard	Retrospective
	1924	Maurice Asselin	
	1925	Pedro Figari	
	1926	Irène Reno	
March–April	1926	Jean Helleu	
	1926	Berthe Morisot	Pastels, watercolours, drawings and crayon drawings
December	1926	Jean Puy & Henry de Waroquier	
	1929	Zoum Walter	
	1929, 1930, 1933, 1937	Marcel Roche	
	1932	Adrienne Jouclard	
	1933	Dimitri Bouchène	
	1934	Joseph Rossi	
February	1935	Pauline Peugniez	
	1935	Émile Bouneau	
	1935	Celso Lagar	
	1936	Roland Oudot	
	1936	Jean Aujame	
November	1936	Gérard Cochet, Othon Coubine, Henriette Deloras, Robert Lotiron, Jacques Lestrille, Hélène Marre & Georges Sabbagh	Recent works
17–28 January	1938	Raymond Legueult	
May–June	1938	André Villeboeuf	

== Bibliography (in French) ==
- Hélène Pinet, Les photographes de Rodin : Jacques-Ernest Bulloz, Eugène Druet, Stephen Haweis et Henry Coles, Jean-François Limet, Eduard Steichen, Paris, Musée Rodin, 1986, ISBN 978-2-901428-11-4.
- Rodin et la photographie, [exhibition catalogue]
- Guide des collections du musée Rodin, Paris, Musée Rodin, 2008.
- Pierre Sanchez, Les expositions de la galerie Eugène Druet. Répertoire des artistes exposants et liste de leurs œuvres, 1903–1938, preface by Dominique Vieville, Éditions L'Échelle de Jacob, 2009.
