= Roger & Gallet =

French perfume company

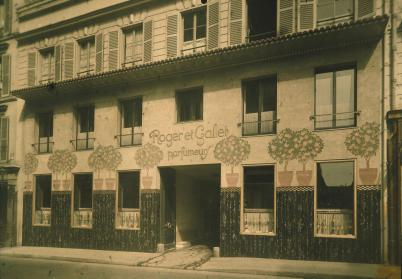
- Facade of Roger & Gallet photographed by Eugène Druet
- Industry: Fragrance, cosmetics
- Founded: 1862; 164 years ago
- Founder: Charles Armand Roger; Charles Martial Gallet
- Headquarters: Paris, France
- Parent: L'Oreal
- Website: en.roger-gallet.com

Roger & Gallet (also Roger et Gallet) is a French perfume company founded by merchant Charles Armand Roger and banker Charles Martial Gallet in 1862. It was owned by the L'Oréal group until its sale to Impala SAS in 2020.

Roger & Gallet purchased the Parisian perfumery business founded in 1806 by Jean Marie Joseph Farina, grand-grand-nephew of Giovanni Maria Farina, the creator of Eau de Cologne. Roger & Gallet then won a legal dispute over the right to use the Farina family name, and the company now owns the rights to Eau de Cologne extra vieille, in contrast to the Original Eau de Cologne from Cologne.

== Specialty ==
Roger & Gallet specialized in toilet soap which was produced in a large factory near Paris. The company made a name for itself with its luxurious bath soaps, which in 1879 first appeared in their signature round shape, with the crinkled silk paper and seal, still in use today. Later, they proved successful with the newly synthesized fragrance of violet, for which they held the French rights, producing perfumes such as Vera Violetta.

== Acquisition ==
In 1975, Roger & Gallet was acquired by the Sanofi Group, who in turn sold the brand to Gucci in 1999. L'Oréal acquired Roger & Gallet from Gucci, a subsidiary at that time of PPR, in 2008.
