= Femina (France) =

French women's fashion and cultural periodical 1901-1954

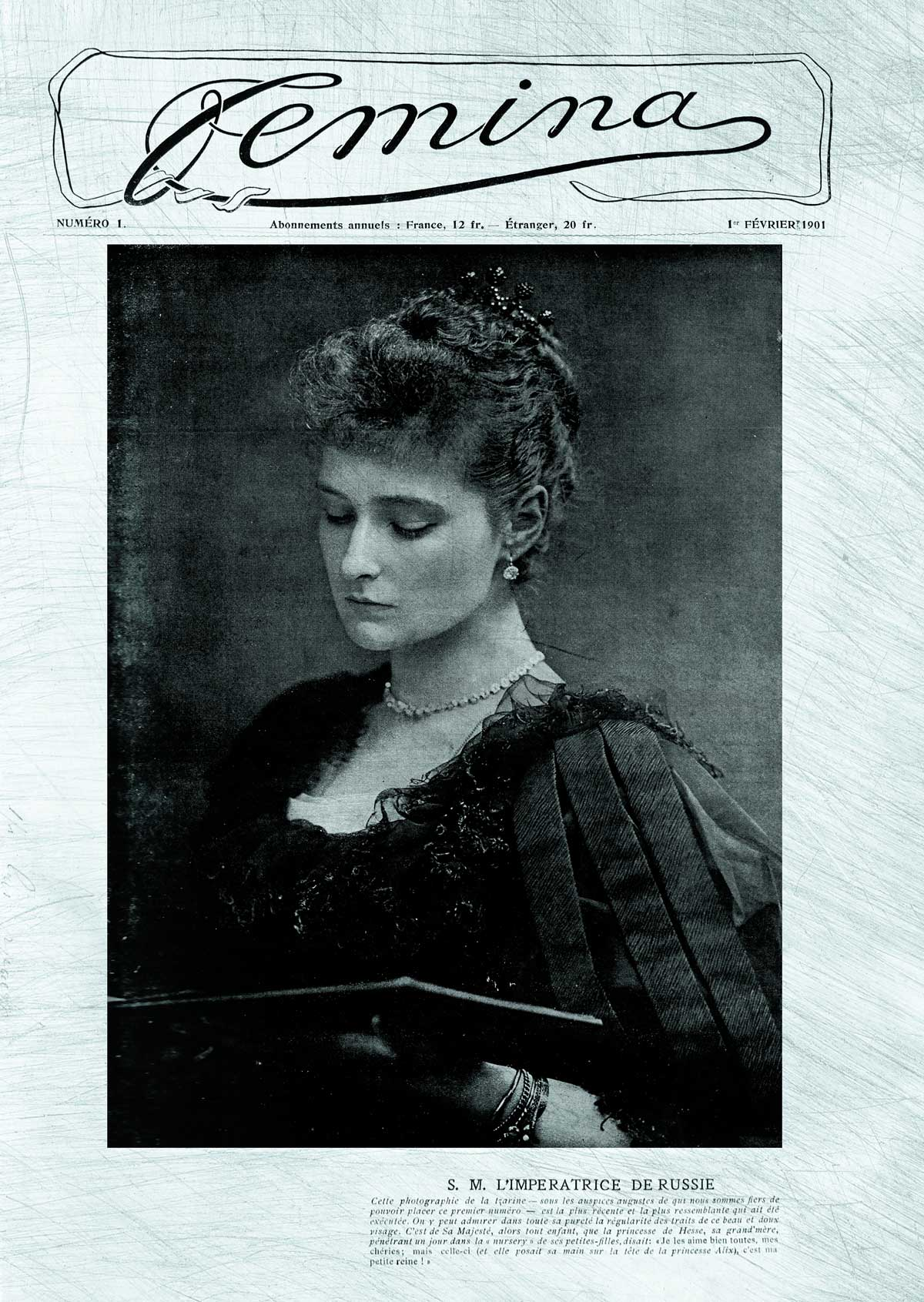
Cover of the first number of Femina, 1 January 1901, published in Paris by Pierre Lafitte

Femina was a French bi-monthly women's magazine, created in 1901 by Pierre Lafitte and it continued publication in various forms until 1964. The publication gave its name to the Prix Femina.

== Background ==
Femina was a French women's magazine. The magazine was founded in 1901 by Pierre Lafitte and was published under various titles until 1964.

The title of the publication is taken from the Latin word femina for "woman". It was subtitled "La revue idéale de la femme et de la jeune fille" ("The ideal magazine for women and girls") and targeted the female bourgeoisie. It was immediate success; by the end of its second year, it achieved a circulation of 100,000 and reached a high of 135,000 between 1905 and 1910, triple the sales of La Fronde and outselling influential daily newspapers Le Temps (36,000), Le Figaro (46,000) and L'Éclair (93,000).

Below the various iterations of the publication are listed.

- Femina (1901–1917)
- Femina et Vie heureuse réunies (1917–1921)
- Femina (1922–1954)
- Le Nouveau Femina (1954–1955)
- Nouveau Femina et France-Illustration (1956–1956)
- Femina-Illustration (1956–1956)
- Réalités Femina-Illustration (1956–1964)

== History ==
The magazine was founded in 1901 by Pierre Lafitte.

In 1902, Hachette launched a competing monthly titled La Vie heureuse. In 1917, Pierre Lafitte sold Femina to Hachette and the magazines were merged to form Femina et Vie heureuse réunies. Though only the Femina title appeared on the cover. In January 1922 the "Prix Femina-La Vie Heureuse" (launched in 1904 as "Prix La Vie Heureuse") was renamed to Prix Femina.

The magazine was issued regularly until 1939 with Lafitte and Robert Ochs as co-editors (who became editor in 1935) and Martine Rénier as fashion editor. The three of them are credited with the August 1939 issue.

Femina reappeared after World War II as a luxurious quarterly and with out-of-series editions in colour from 1945. The December 1953/January 1954 issue was the last under the Femina name and from March 1954 it appeared as Le Nouveau Femina (The New Femina). In January 1956 it became Nouveau Femina et France-Illustration, following a merger with France-Illustration. In April it became Femina-Illustration.

In December 1956 Femina-Illustration merged with Réalités to form Réalités Femina-Illustration. During this period an American edition of Réalités continued publication and did not adopt the Femina-Illustration subtitle, the French publication also absorbed Monde illustré. In 1964 the magazine was rebranded to Réalités and remained in publication until 1978 when it merged with Le Spectacle du monde. Le Spectacle du Monde would cease publication in 2014.

== Content ==
Femina started as a bimonthly society magazine and before the First World War its editorial coverage was broader than other magazines aimed at women. It presented a balanced mix of reportage on fashion, the arts and current events, with generous coverage of leisure activities, especially sports (the cover of 1 April 1902, shows the photograph of two women playing ping pong and another magazine published by Lafitte, La Vie au vent, catered to women sports enthusiasts), and professional advice on interior decoration. Advertising from luxury retailers and manufacturers covered at least five pages of each issue.

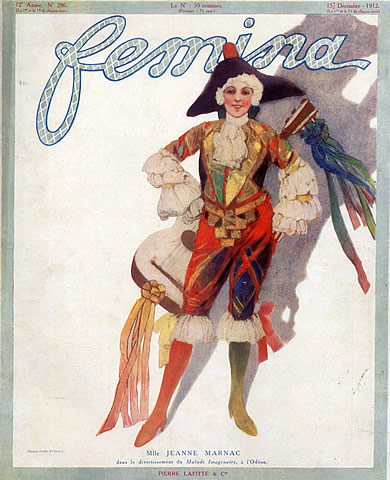
Affiche Femina

=== Writing ===
Leading journalists contributed articles, including women writers with a serious commitment to women's issues, among them being poet Jane Catulle-Mendès, and established novelists Gabrielle Réval, Jeanne Lapauze and Marcelle Tinayre. Amongst its male writers were allies of feminism: Marcel Prévost, Jules Claretie (director of the Comédie Francaise which staged several progressive plays about women), Maurice Donnay (who wrote the 1913 feminist play L’éclaireuses), Paul Margueritte (who supported divorce and the decriminalization of adultery), and literary critic Emile Faguet, sympathetic to women writers. It profiled celebrated women, including those working in the professions; as an example of its contents and inclusion of female celebrities of the day, the 1 May 1903 issue entitled "Women Artists at the Salon of 1903", devoted three illustrated pages to Louise Abbéma, Louise Catherine Breslau, Camille Claudel, Maximilian Guyon, Louise Clément-Carpeaux (cover), Laure Coutan-Montorgueil, and Juana Romani.

=== Imagery ===
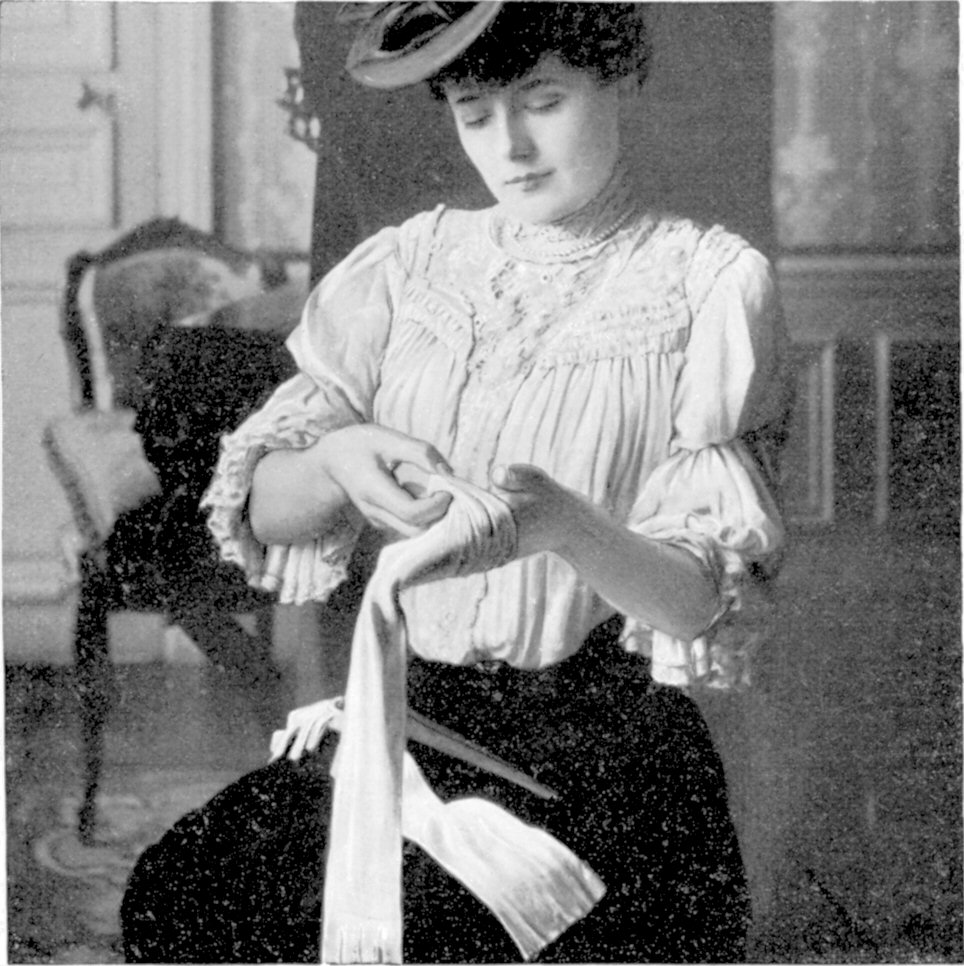
Photographic series on the correct donning of gloves; step one

Femina projected a strong visual appeal. Current fashion in clothing and interiors was illustrated with photographs made, in the case of garments, in the studio or at social events (such as those taken at the races by the Séeberger Brothers) and hand-drawn illustrations, including instructions on fitting garments; on the correct way to remove gloves, for example. Photographic portraits played a role in engaging readers with élite society figures and unpeopled pictures of their prestige home interiors appealed to aspirational readers' curiosity. After a few years, the cover of the magazine, which was in most cases a photograph, was alternated with a bi-chrome comic illustration. In 1906, the cover of the 1 November number displayed a drawing of a woman breastfeeding her child, signed by Paul César Helleu.

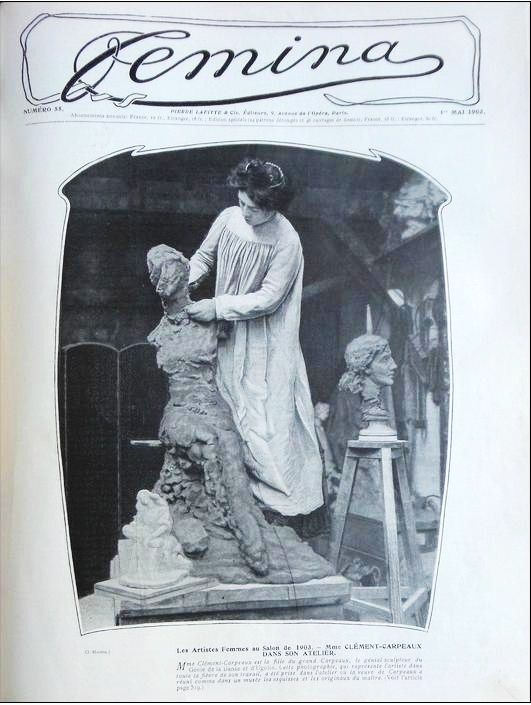
Cover of Femina of 1 May 1903 devoted to women artists showing Louise Clément-Carpeaux (1872–1961), daughter of Jean-Baptiste Carpeaux

=== Reader surveys ===
Readers strongly engaged with the magazine; its frequent surveys of them brought enthusiastic response; including the desirability of sport for young women, women in the army. Seven to nine thousand subscribers (about 1 in 15), and often more, would regularly take part; 14,728 readers penned their ideas on the ten qualities a woman needed to be perfect, and 13,758 readers advised on the right bride for the German crown prince. In 1909, the Académie française raised the question of the election of female members: immediately, Femina asked its readers to nominate 40 women writers, contemporary or former, who would constitute an imaginary female academy. 6,600 responded and the magazine and published on a double-page an illustration showing the 40 elected standing under the dome of the academy. To a question about their notion of what income would support “la vie idéale" readers nominated a minimum twenty thousand francs per annum, ten times the typical salary of a teacher.

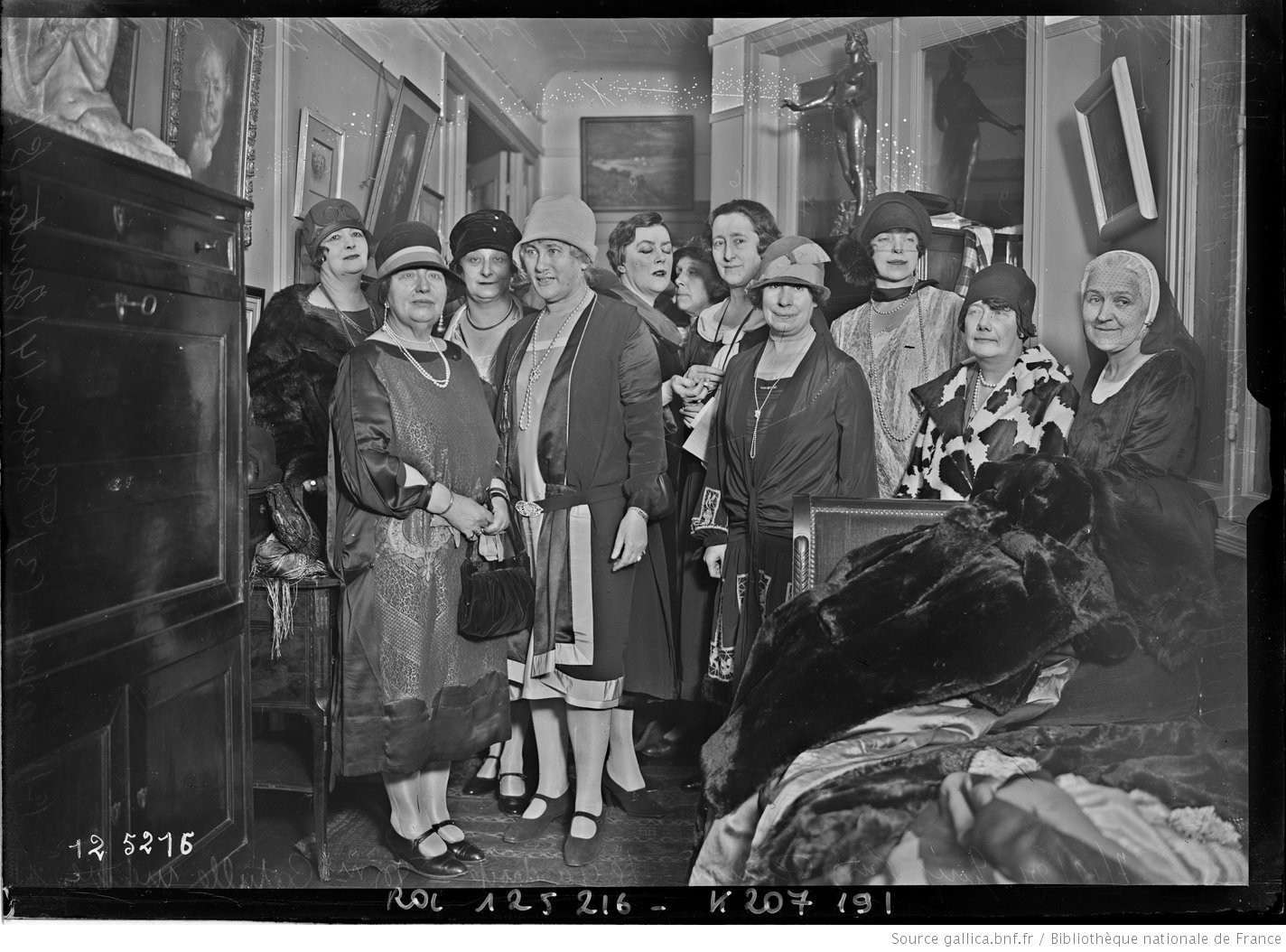
Jury of the Prix Femina meeting on 7 December 1927 at 26, rue Vavin, Paris

== Editorial direction ==
Anne R. Epstein, in her review of the book by Colette Cosnier, Les Dames de Femina raises the question of the editorial orientation of the magazine, recalling that its readership was essentially composed of bourgeois women with conservative tendencies; it was expensive, generally on sale at double or more the annual subscription of most women's domestic magazines. Pierre Lafitte did not have the goal, originally, to publish a feminist magazine, but rather a women's magazine:

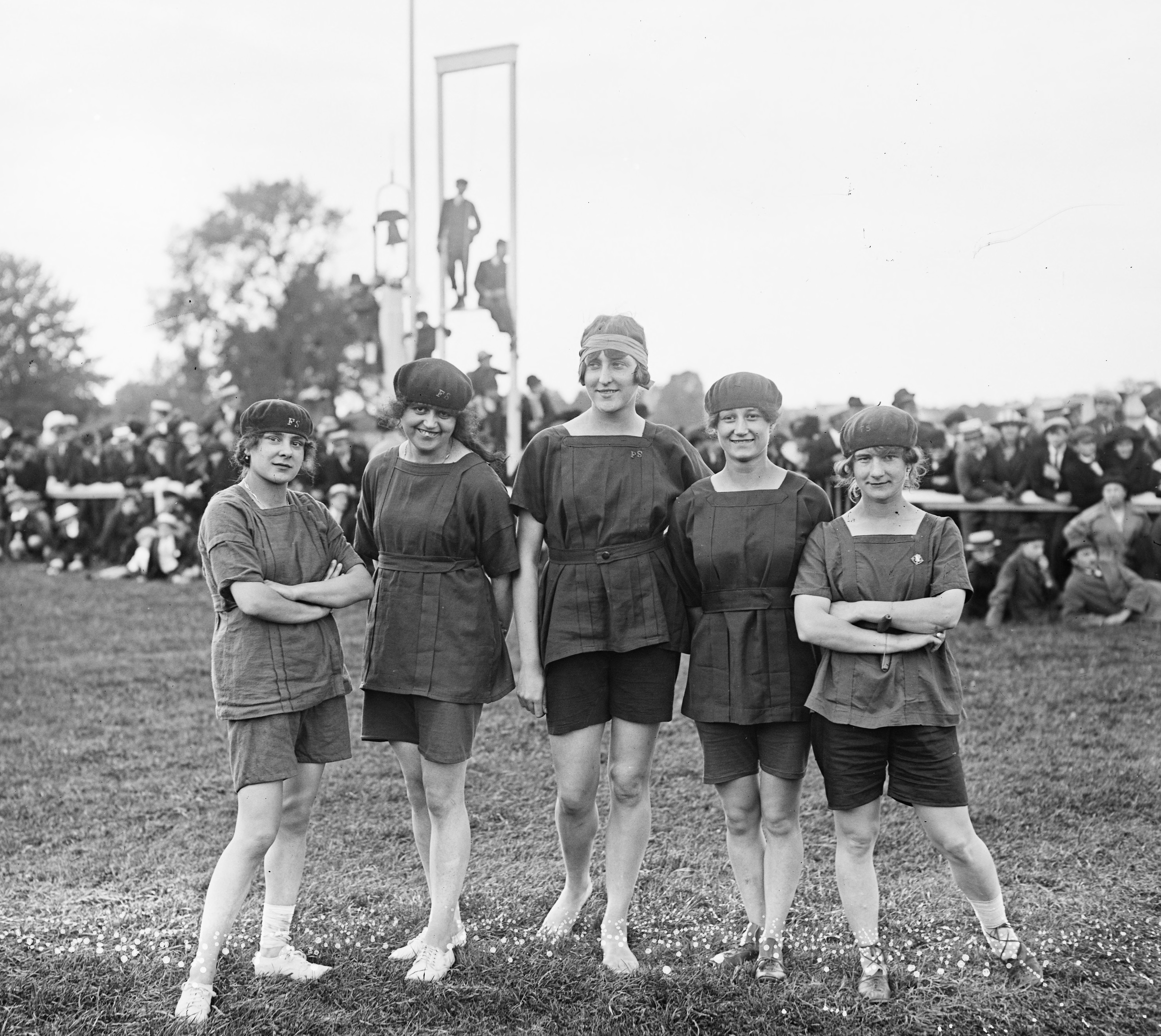
Athletes competing in sports sponsored by Femina

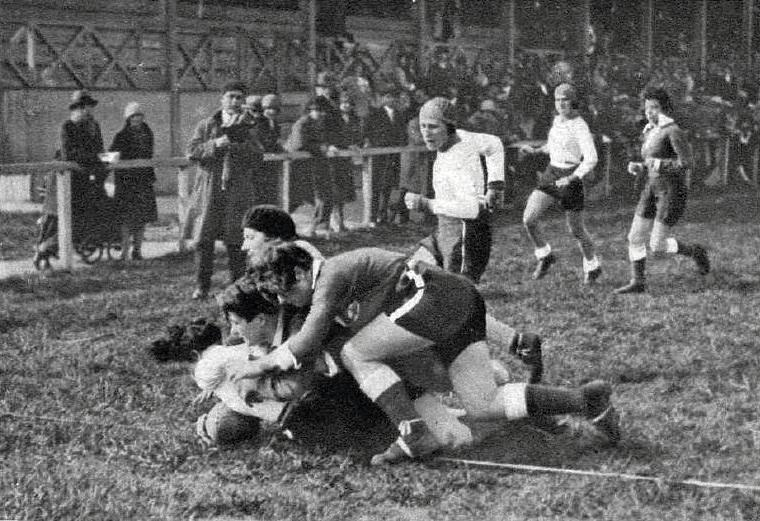
1929 rugby match between Femina Sports and the Hirondelles, Paris

The ambitions and editorial strategy of Pierre Lafitte, director of the publication, was inspired by the success of the English "Ladies Magazine". He envisioned a magazine representing luxury, trends, everyday life and family: it is the forerunner of "people" magazines and lifestyle and fashion guides for the affluent woman."

However, Femina was always feminine and occasionally even feminist, given that advances of that time including the suffragettes' demands in England, and achievement of the right to vote by Danish women, were issues discussed in the magazine. Francesca Berry argues that her "analysis of its interiors pages in the context of other magazines...suggests that Femina is worthy of re-evaluation from a feminist perspective, not least because the [domestic] interior is, at times, allowed to operate as a personally meaningful space for the negotiation of complex feminine subjectivities." In addition, Lafitte showcased the sporting abilities of women, launching several prizes in the context of competitions (related to golf, in particular), including the Femina Cup, a women's aviation award in 1910.

During the First World War it was published only intermittently, but in the 1920s increased its popularity as a modern magazine, displacing old-fashioned rivals such as Le Moniteur de la Mode which closed in 1913 and new luxury titles, like the French edition of Vogue (1920-), as Femina increasingly featured high fashion and much less reportage, and by the mid-twenties was image-oriented, and concerned primarily with a modern lifestyle of seasonal leisure and fashion. Through the 1930s Femina evoked fantasy and desire before information, necessity or practicality, offering the modem woman's magazine formulae of escapist and unattainable visual spectacle to a more diverse and younger female readership.

== Other titles ==
Femina is also the name of a series of women's magazines unrelated to the original publication:

- Femina (Sweden; 1944–present)
- Femina (Denmark; 1952–present)
- Femina (India; 1959–present)
- Femina (Switzerland; 1962–present)
- Femina (Indonesia; 1972–present)
- Femina (Hong Kong; 1973–?)
- Femina (South Africa; 1982–2010)
- Version Femina (France; 2002–present)
- Femina (Switzerland, in Esperanto; 2005–2016)
- Femina (China; 2008–2018)
- Femina (India, in Hindi; 2008–2019)
- Femina (India, in Tamil; 2011–2020)
- Femina (India, in Bengali; 2014–2019)

Swedish and Danish Femina are published by the same company. Indian Femina, Femina in Bengal, Feminia in Hindi, Feminia in Tamil were published by the same company.

== See also ==
- Prix Femina: literary prize sponsored by the magazine from 1924
- The Femina Cup or Coupe Femina: 1910 French challenge with a prize awarded to women aviators only
- Théâtre Fémina or Salle Fémina theatre located under the offices of the magazine at 90 avenue des Champs-Élysées which operated 1907-1929
