= Pierre Lafitte (journalist) =

French journalist, editor and publisher of the twentieth century

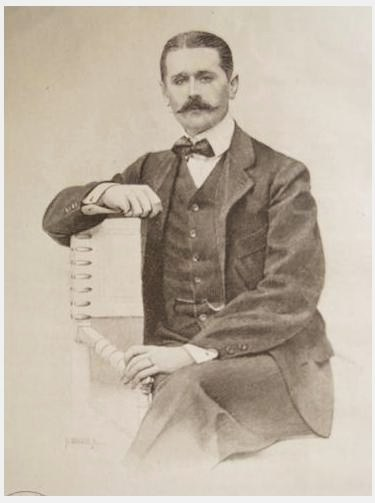
Photogravure portrait of Pierre Lafitte in 1908

Pierre Antoine Baptiste René Lafitte (French pronunciation: [pjɛʁ ɑ̃twan batist ʁəne lafit]) was a French journalist, publisher and editor born 3 May 1872 in Bordeaux and died 13 December 1938 in Paris. He innovated in illustrated press and popular novel formats in France.

== Early life ==
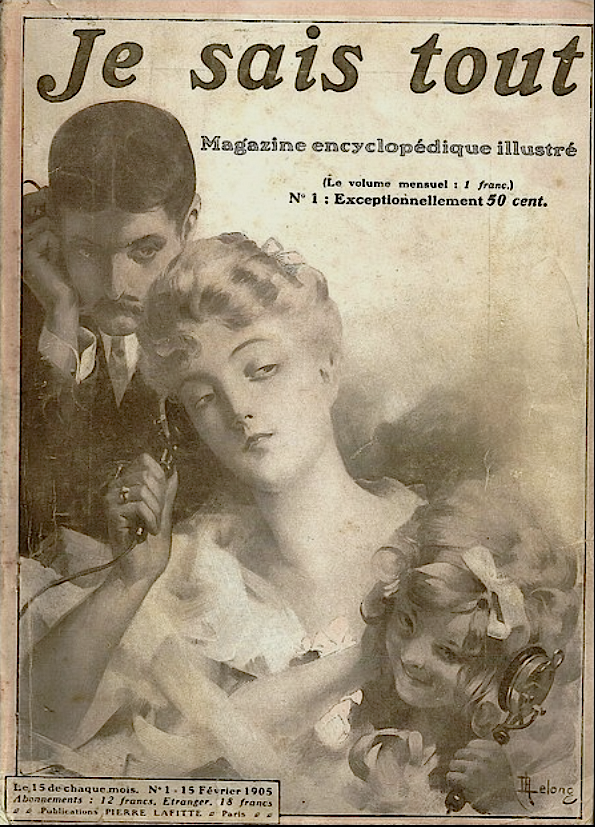
1905 Je Sais Tout cover by René Lelong

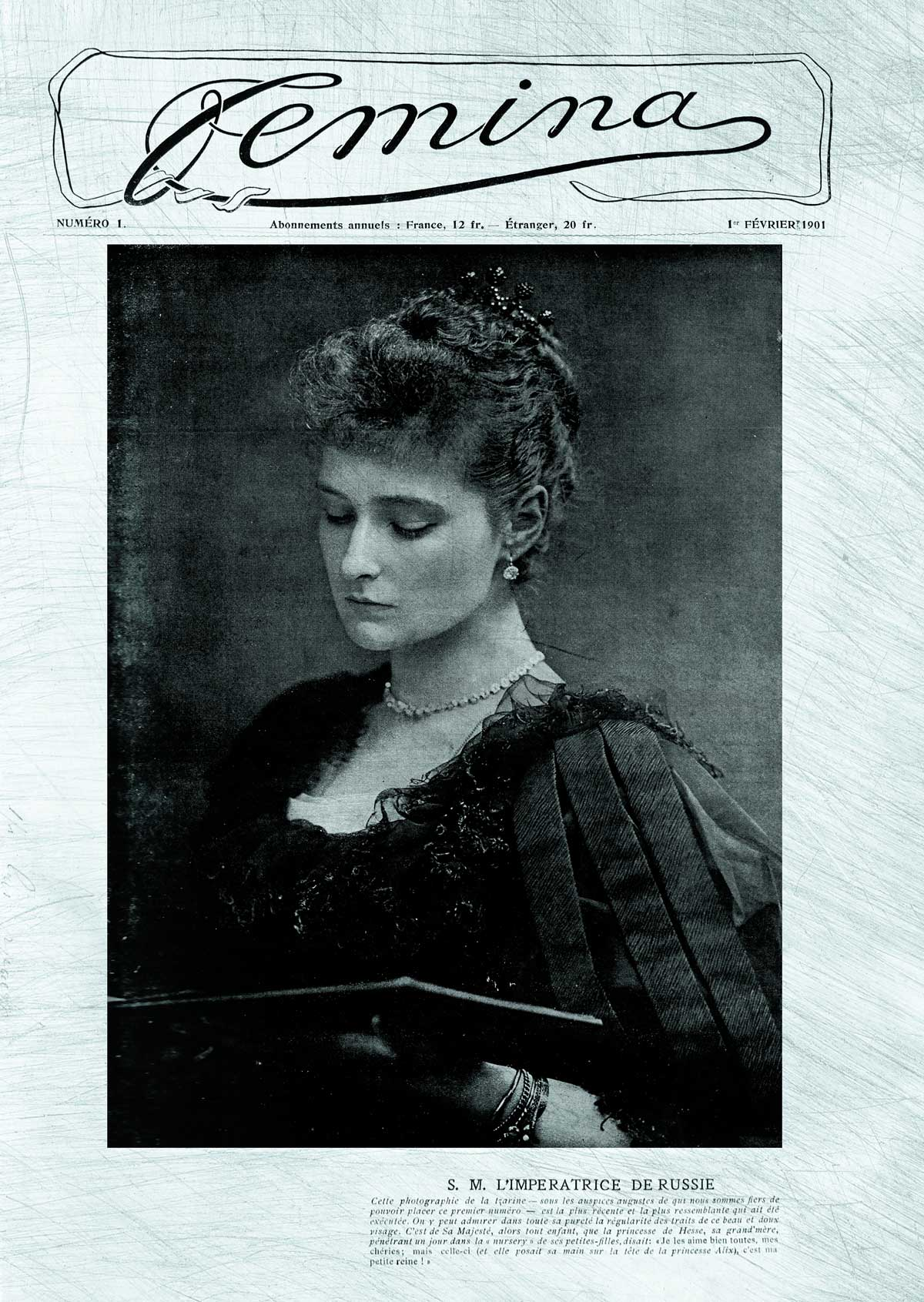
Femina magazine, cover, 1901

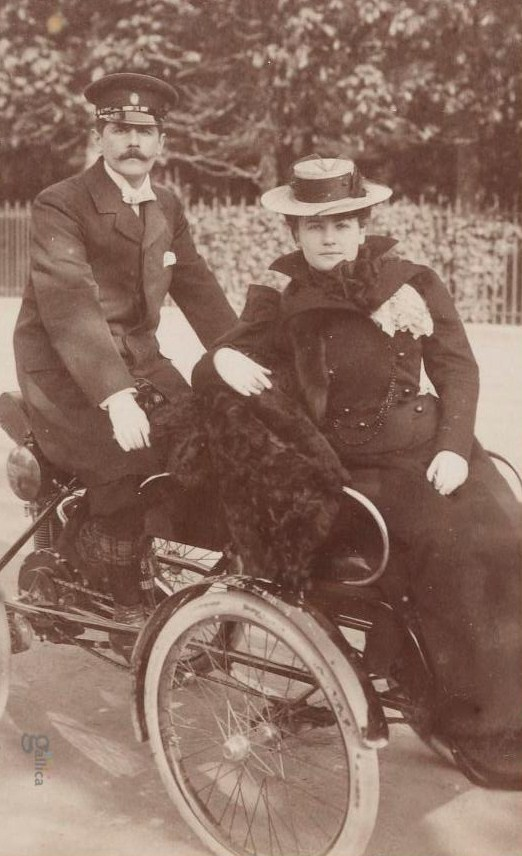
Pierre Lafitte et his wife, on a motor-driven quadricycle. Photo: Jules Beau (c.1898-1899).

Pierre Lafitte was born and raised in Bordeaux, son of Marie Alexandrine Arquier and Jean Lafitte, a merchant. At high school, he was passionate about bicycles and in undertaking a bachelor's degree, his ambition was to become a sports journalist. He joined the editorial staff of La Petite Gironde, a local daily newspaper, then Véloce-sport, a sports weekly, which he helped modernise and for which he covered the first Bordeaux-Paris cycle race in 1891.

== Paris ==
He went to Paris in 1892 and was hired as a journalist at L'Écho de Paris by Valentin Simond, while also working as a salesperson for Cycles Humber, and for other cycling magazines. In 1897, he was appointed editor-in-chief of the weekly La Vie au grand air, which he transformed into a magazine mainly illustrated with photography: this new formula was released on April 1, 1898, and Lafitte took control of it.

== Publisher ==
At the age of twenty-seven and highly ambitious, Lafitte founded "Les Éditions Pierre Lafitte et Cie" in 1899–1900 at 9-11 Avenue de l'Opéra. His main competitors were the Marc family and Baschet (L'Illustration), while Hachette had not yet invested this format. On January 5, 1900, he founded the Société anonyme d'éditions sportives (SAES), which took over the weekly La Vie au grand air. Given his understanding of the value of the visual in magazines, both Pierre Lafitte in 1909 and the German Kurt Korff (Berliner Illustrirte Zeitung) in 1927 both made reference to the moving image in justifying the use of photographic illustrations in their magazines, SAES was soon transformed into a Société Générale d'éditions illustrées. His artistic director from 1903 to 1910 was Adolphe Cossard.

He created several other illustrated periodicals including Femina (launched in February 1901), Musica (from 1902 to 1908), Je sais tout (in February 1905), Fermes et Châteaux (in September 1905), Le Petit Magazine de la jeunesse (1906), La Parisienne (1911), and Excelsior founded in 1910, the first fully illustrated daily newspaper. To do this, he created new editorial organisations, such as the Société générale d'éditions illustrées.

Not limited to magazines, Lafitte published abundantly illustrated special albums from April 1907; renewed the popular novel by republishing in cheap collections the adventures of Arsène Lupin, Rouletabille and Sherlock Holmes illustrated by Gaston Simoes de Fonseca, which had been serialized in Je sais tout; and created a collection of coloured children's board books, under the direction of Franc-Nohain, the "Lilliput-Bibliothèque", and the "Ideal-Bibliothèque", launched in July 1909 at 95 centimes per volume. With Henry Roujon, he founded in 1909 a collection, "Les Peintres illustrés / Artistic-Bibliothèque", offering reproductions of paintings in colour, and the "Les Grands Hommes" collection under the direction of Jules Clarétie. PAGE XXI IN February 1910, Lafitte published Le Fantôme de l'Opéra in a 510 page volume of twenty-seven numbered chapters with five illustrations by André Castaigne.

In 1904, he co-founded with Hachette the Femina-Vie Heureuse literary prize and then also launched the Femina Cup in 1908, later renamed the Pierre Lafitte Trophy, a women's golf competition, followed in 1910 by a homonymous prize reserved for airwomen an award of 2,000 francs which was awarded to the woman who, on New Year's Eve, had made the longest flight.

In a venture into cinema in 1908, Paul Laffitte founded, at the request of the members of the Comédie-Française, the company Le Film d'Art to ensure the production on screen of historical, mythological or theatrical scenes filmed from authentic and renowned adaptations and thus to expand the then populist medium of cinema to audiences in a more cultured demographic and to make cinema "the great educator of the people".

=== Decline ===
During the First World War, the Excelsior newspaper was no longer profitable, Pierre Lafitte had to sell part of his productions to Hachette, including some of his periodical publications such as Je sais tout in 1916, as well as his premises located at 88-90 avenue des Champs-Élysées in which he had opened in 1917. Paul Dupuy, son of Jean Dupuy who was the director of Le Petit Parisien and the founder in 1913 of La Science et la Vie magazine, bought another part of the titles including Excelsior and created Excelsior Publications. Lafitte remained, by contract, literary director, then technical director of his editions taken over by Hachette who allowed him to found a monthly magazine entitled Flirt - literature, arts, elegance in 1922, subsequently merged partially with La Vie au grand air as a new monthly, Très sport, "the only technical and practical magazine for the automobile and all sports written by the champions", which folded in 1926.

Always a keen sportsman and follower of sports, in 1920, he founded the Union of Sports Newspaper Directors, and during the 1920s, Lafitte spent much of his time in the south of France. Undeterred by his previous economic constraints, he then founded La Gazette de Biarritz in 1921 and La Gazette de la Riviera in 1925, its Mediterranean counterpart.

During the 1930s, a period of economic upheaval in the broader press, he became an advisor to major titles such as Le Figaro (technical director and vice-president), Paris-Soir and L'Intransigeant.

== Arsène Lupin ==
The first editions of the crime series Arsène Lupin were published in Je sais tout in 1905. In 1904, Lafitte had asked Maurice Leblanc to write a detective novel whose hero was as brilliant as England's Sherlock Holmes. Léo Fontan designed the jackets and created Lupin's thin and ironic face with the monocle and cane. Several illustrators contributed the internal drawings including Maurice Toussaint, Roger Broders and Manuel Orazi. However, it is Léo Fontan who illustrated the cover of the books.

== Honours ==
On October 11, 1906, Lafitte was appointed a knight of the Legion of Honour under the sponsorship of Maurice Sarraut, then in August 1914, an officer, this time under that of Basil Zaharoff. On October 31, 1938, he was elevated to the rank of Commander of the Legion of Honor and died on December 13 in Paris, aged 66.
