= Jules Scalbert =

French painter

- Born: Jules Scalbert; 1851; Douai, France
- Died: 1933 (aged 81–82); Paris, France
- Known for: Painting
- Movement: Realism

Jules Scalbert (1851–1928) was an artist, born in Douai, France in 1851.

He was a pupil of Isidore Pils and Henri Lehmann. He depicted historical and genre scenes, allegorical subjects, figures, flowers, and worked in pastel technique. The artist started exhibiting at Paris Salon in 1876, afterwards showed his works in Salon des Artistes Francais, of which he became a member in 1883. Scalbert obtained an honorary award in 1889 as well as medals in 1891 and 1901. His works achieve remarkable prices (as high as US$80,000) at international auctions.

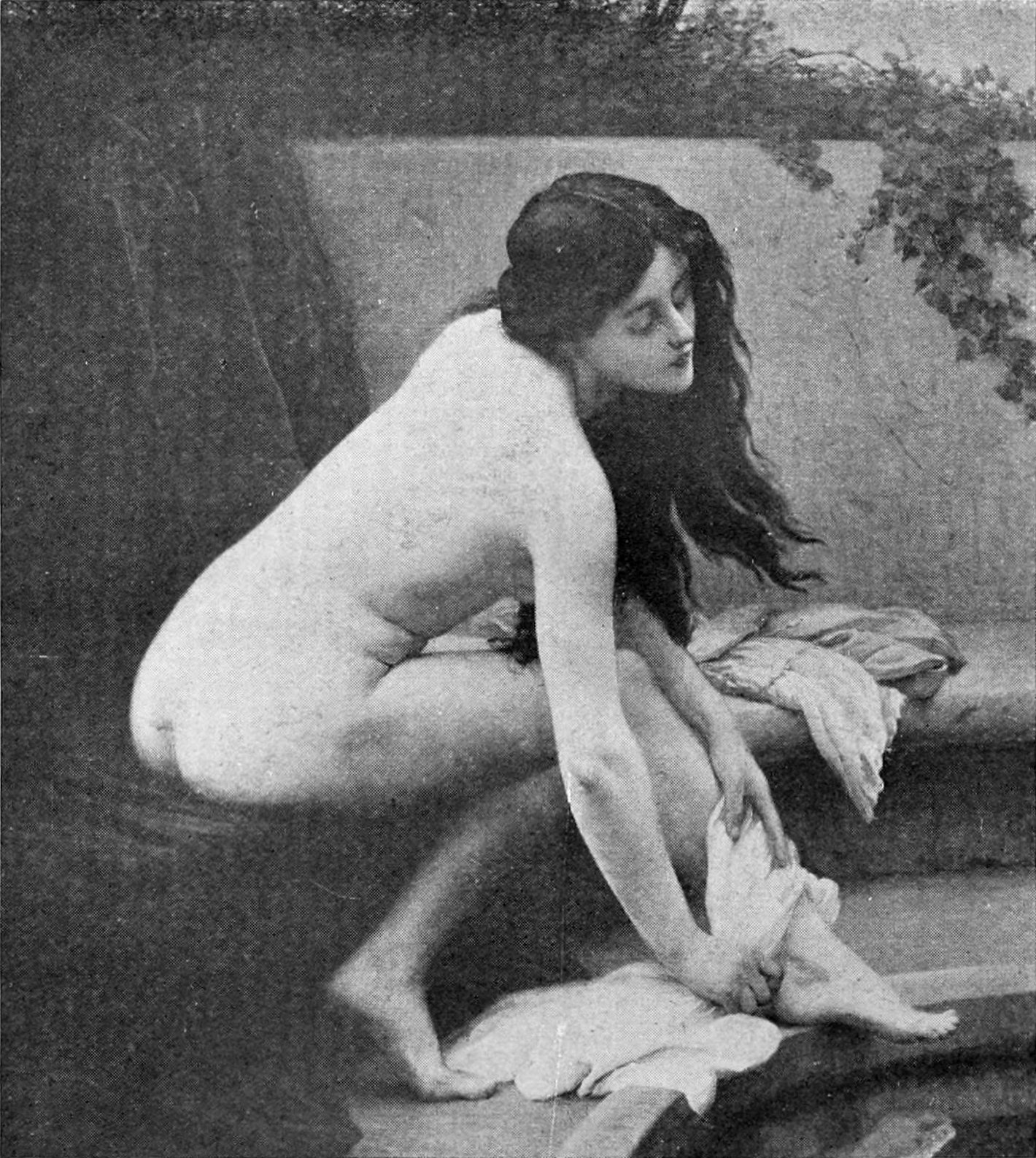
Bathing, 1907.
