= Jules Huret =

French journalist

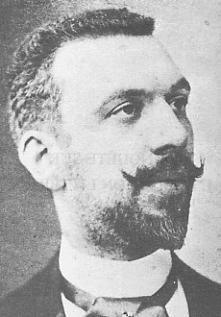
Jules Huret

Jules Huret (French: [yʁɛ]; 8 April 1863, Boulogne-sur-Mer, Pas-de-Calais – 14 February 1915, Paris) was a French journalist, best known for his interviews with writers.

== Life ==
Born to a family of fishermen, he started work aged 15 at the secretariat of the mayor's office at Boulogne, to support his widowed mother. In 1881 he founded a small literary review and four years later came to Paris, finding work there as an editor of scholarly books on the Rive Gauche. Entering in 1886 L'Événement of Edmond Magnier, he remained in its employ for 6 months, then worked for several other daily newspapers.

In 1890, Valentin Simond took him on as a regular collaborator on L'Écho de Paris. In March 1891, he began his famous "Enquête sur l'évolution littéraire" (Enquiry on literary evolution), in the course of which he interviewed 64 writers, including Émile Zola and his five collaborators on Les Soirees de Medan, Octave Mirbeau and Maurice Barrès, about the state of French literature and their perspectives on it, and on the battle of the "Psychologists against the Naturalists" and the "Symbolists against the Parnassians". The basic proposal of these interviews, which the interviewees had to accept, was that the Darwinian principal of evolution could be applied to literature, which was also in certain ways a battlefield in which the fittest survived.

Making a speciality of interviews and practising it to perfection, he reported the spirit of his notable contemporaries with as much tact as efficiency. He moved in 1892 to Le Figaro, where the same year he began an "Enquête sur la question sociale en Europe" (Enquiry into the social question of Europe), which took him to Rome, Vienna, Zurich, Vienna, Germany and Russia. In 1895, under the direction of Antonin Périvier and Fernand de Rodays, Huret saw himself entrusted with Petite chronique des lettres du quotidien (A short report on the letters of the day), then – from 1896 to 1899 – a report on the state of the theatre. From 1902, he made great voyages to foreign lands, sending back several reports. He published enquiries on the United States of America in Le Figaro, which his friend Octave Mirbeau proposed for the prix Goncourt, along with ones on Germany and Argentina and on France's universities, politics, poor, and critics' rights.

== Works ==
- Enquête sur l'évolution littéraire. Conversations avec MM. Renan, de Goncourt, Émile Zola, Guy de Maupassant, Huysmans, Anatole France, Maurice Barrès, etc. (1891) Online text
- La Catastrophe du Bazar de la Charité (4 mai 1897). Historique du Bazar de la charité, la catastrophe. Documents recueillis et mis en ordre par Jules Huret (1897) Online text
- Enquête sur la question sociale en Europe (1897) Online text
- Sarah Bernhardt (1899)
- Loges et coulisses (1901) Online text
- Tout yeux, tout oreilles (1901) Online text
- Les Grèves. Enquête au Creusot, à Lille, Roubaix, Anzin, Lens, Marseille, Carmaux, Lyon, Saint-Étienne, Saint-Chamond (1902)
- En Amérique. De New-York à la Nouvelle-Orléans (1904) Online text
- En Amérique. De San Francisco au Canada (1905)
- En Allemagne. Rhin et Westphalie : prospérité, les villes, les ports, usiniers et philanthropes, les grands syndicats patronaux (1907) Online text
- En Argentine (2 volumes, 1911–1913) Online text
- En Allemagne. Berlin (1913)
- Rothschild et la question sociale (1920) Online text
- Correspondance Octave Mirbeau-Jules Huret (2009)
