= La Carmélite =

Comic opera by Reynaldo Hahn

Hahn in 1906

La Carmélite is a 1902 comic opera, a comédie musicale in four acts and five scenes, by Reynaldo Hahn, to a libretto by Catulle Mendès. Hahn's second opera, like the first it was premiered at the Opéra-Comique.

== Roles ==
- Emma Calvé as Louise de La Vallière mistress of Louis XIV
- Lucien Muratore as Louis XIV
- Hector Dufranne as the Archbishop.

== Recording ==
- Théâtre du Capitole de Toulouse, Leo Hussain, Bru Zane recorded 2020, release ?.
