= Judith Gautier =

French poet, translator and historical novelist (1845–1917)

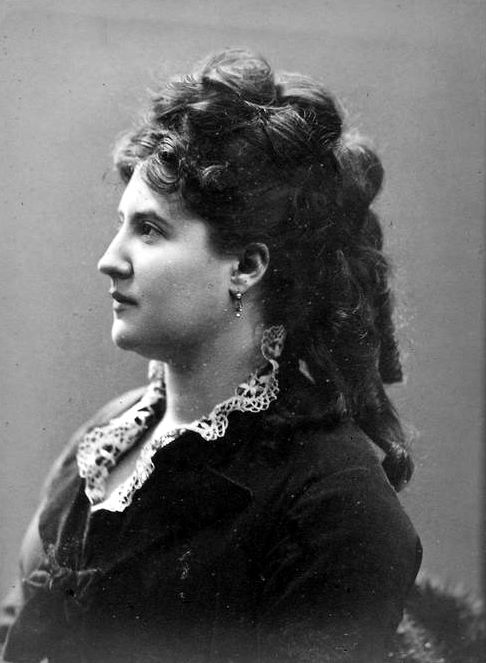
- Born: 25 August 1845; Paris, France
- Died: 26 December 1917 (aged 72); France
- Occupations: Poet; novelist
- Spouse: Catulle Mendès
- Partner: Richard Wagner (1876)
- Writing career
- Genres: Poetry, historical literature

Judith Gautier (25 August 1845, Paris – 26 December 1917) was a French poet, translator and historical novelist, the daughter of Théophile Gautier and Ernesta Grisi, sister of the noted singer and ballet dancer Carlotta Grisi.

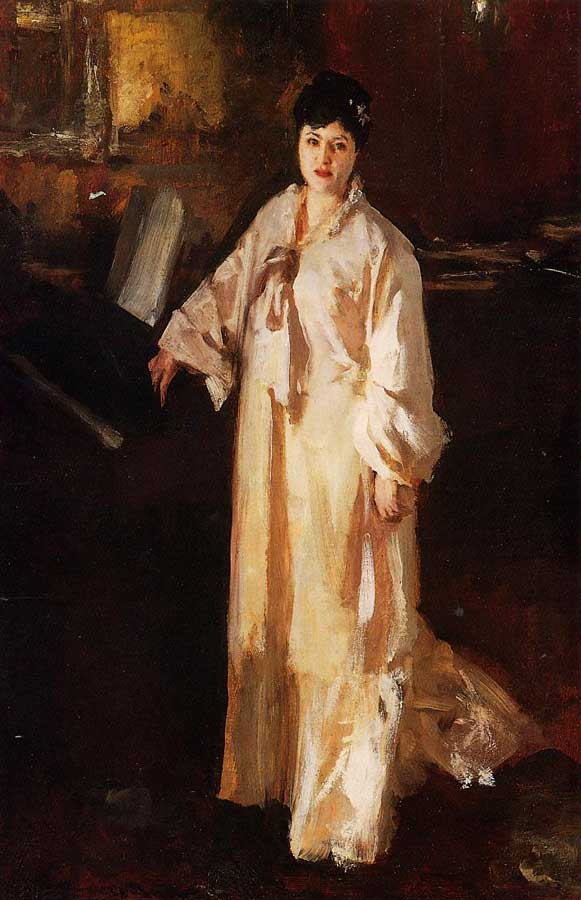
Judith Gautier, John Singer Sargent, 1885

She was married to Catulle Mendès, but soon separated from him and had a brief affair with the composer Richard Wagner during the late summer of 1876. She collaborated with Pierre Loti, the famous novelist, in writing a play, La fille du ciel (1912; English, The Daughter of Heaven), translated and produced under their personal supervision at the Century Theatre, New York City. She was an Oriental scholar and her works dealt mainly with Chinese and Japanese themes. Her translations were among the earliest to bring Chinese and Japanese poetry to the attention of modern European poets. She was a member of the Académie Goncourt (1910–17).

== Works ==
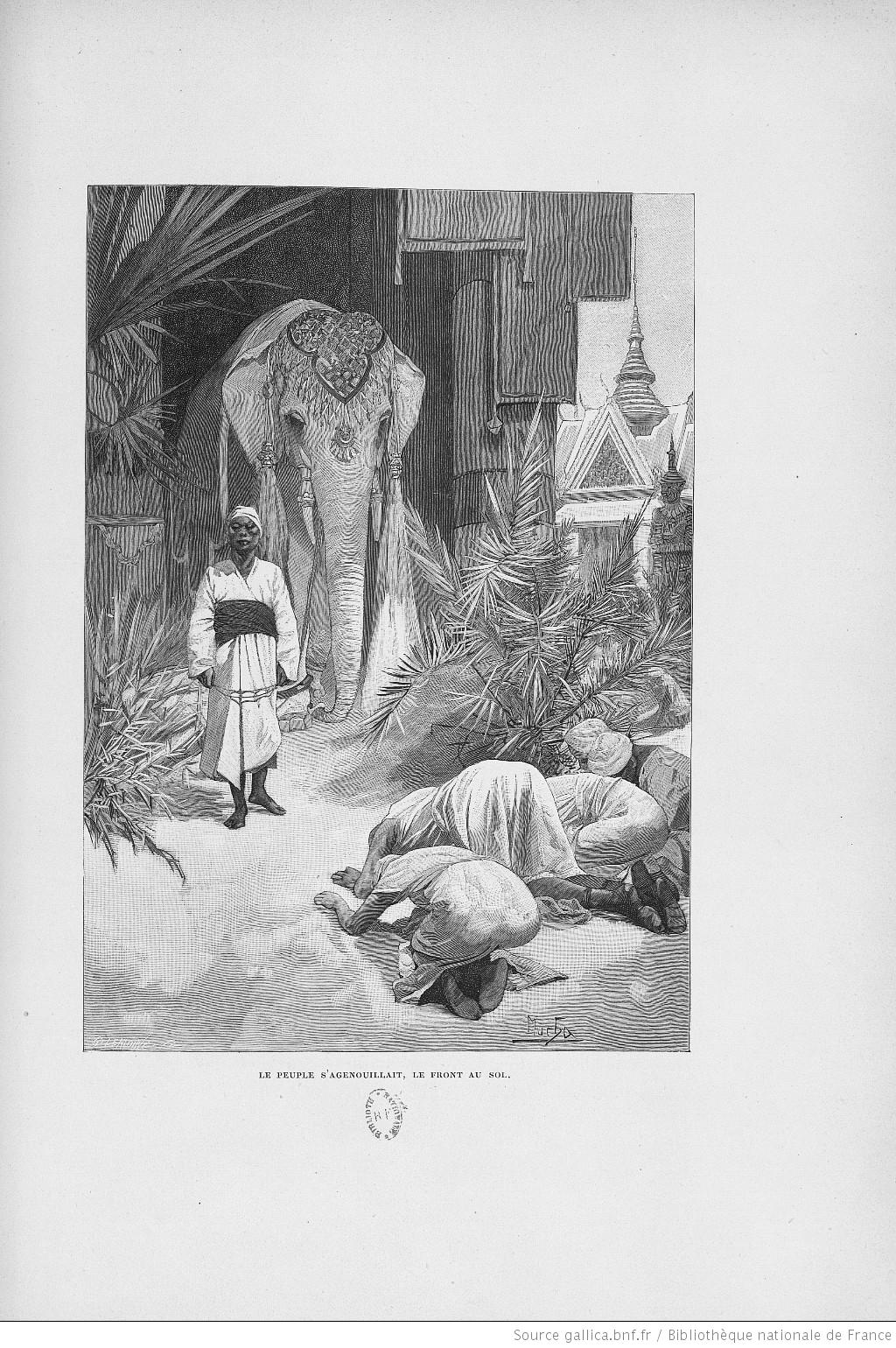
Mémoires d'un éléphant blanc

- Le livre de jade (Paris, 1867) (extended edition Paris, 1902)
- Le Dragon Impérial (1869)
- L'Usurpateur (1875)
- Isoline et La Fleur-Serpent (1882) (translated by Brian Stableford as Isoline and the Serpent-Flower (2013), ISBN 978-1-61227-152-1)
- La Reine de Bangalore (1887)
- Les Princesses d'Amours (Paris, 1900)
- Le Collier des Jours (Paris, 1902)
- Le Paravent: De Soie et D'Or (Paris, 1904)
- L’Avare Chinois, an adaptation of a Yuan zaju (Chinese opera) Khan thsian-nou by Zheng Tingyu (Paris, 1908)^{:130}
- Mémoires d'un Éléphant Blanc (The Memoirs of a White Elephant), illustrations by Alphonse Mucha (children's book)
