= André Villeboeuf =

French painter

- Born: 2 April 1893; Paris, France
- Died: 23 May 1956 (aged 63); Paradas
- Occupations: Painter illustrator watercolorist printmaker columnist stage designer

André Villeboeuf (2 April 1893 – 23 May 1956) was a French illustrator, painter, watercolorist, printmaker, writer and stage designer.

== Biography ==
André Villeboeuf was born on 2 April 1893, in Paris to Paul Villeboeuf and Louise Aurore Aglaé Pauton. On 5 August 1924, he married Suzanne Gaupillat in Paris and then on 12 December 1934, he remarried Hélène Sophie Cartage. Belonging to a wealthy Parisian family, Villeboeuf was introduced to art by his father, who was a bibliophile. There was in the family library, which Villeboeuf had remembered in his later writings. He studied under the mentorship of Jean-Paul Laurens at the École des beaux-arts de Paris (Fine Arts of Paris) and consequently moved to Montmartre. There he became friends with Léon Detroy. Detroy, also a student of Laurens later rejected the teaching of Laurens and preferred to percept Art directly from nature. After the death of Detroy in 1956, Villeboeuf became depressed and soon died.

French Writer Émile Brami has mentioned that Villeboeuf had been a part of the circle of friends, all from Montmartre who used to live a few hundred meters from each others. This circle consisted of Gen Paul, Louis-Ferdinand Céline, René Fauchois, the sculpture Jean-Gabriel Daragnès, Marcel Aymé, Robert Le Vigan, Serge Perrault, apart from Villeboeuf.

== Works ==
Villeboeuf mainly painted Paris (Le Sacré-Cœurseen from the artist's balcony), Brittany(Pardon de Pleyben), Creuse (where he met with Léon Detroy) and villages from Fresselines to Gargilesse-Dampierre, Saint-Tropez etc.. and Spain, in particular Andalusia (Procession of the penitents in Seville, numerous watercolors on the theme of bullfighting, lithograph Danse gypsy). His works also are seen to portray the trips to Belgium (La fête des Gilles au Carnaval de Binche), the Netherlands (The Cheese Market in Alkmaar), Italy (The Grand Canal in Venice), Greece, Turkey (Village on the Black Sea), Romania, Portugal and Guinea (Cases in the village of Samballo).

In 1939, in the weekly Gringoire, Villeboeuf wrote a very critical piece on the work of Picasso in Deux femmes (The Interior with a Girl). In the same newspaper, he also wrote columns in support of the Portuguese regime of António de Oliveira Salazar. He also had written in the satirical newspaper Le Crapouillot and in the Les Annales politiques et littéraires. In 1925, Villeboeuf and his two friends André Dunoyer de Segonzac and Luc-Albert Moreau together bought the house of Charles Camoin and the renamed "Le Maquis".

== Death ==
Villeboeuf died in Paradas on 23 May 1956.

== Reception ==
Christophe Rameix said "André Villeboeuf led his artistic career at high velocity with the will to see everything, know everything, understand everything … A jack-of-all-trades in the world of the arts". Until his death in 1956, André Dunoyer de Segonzac remained a very closed friend of Villeboeuf. He commented during Villeboeuf's lifetime, "His talent, so lively and spontaneous, will withstand the test of time and will showcase him among the painters of genuine quality". James Ensor, had written a piece on André Villeboeuf's profession as an engraver. Raoul Dufy remarked "In André Villeboeuf's watercolors, I find the same vein, the same happiness that characterizes him both as a painter and as a writer. With his art he talks about men and things. The same gifts also which situate man: critical sense, finesse of and communicative love of life ".

== Exhibitions ==
- Salon des Tuileries, Paris
- Galerie Marcel Guiot, Paris
- Galerie Georges Wildenstein, Paris,
- Galerie de l'Elysée (Alex Glass), Paris,
- Salon des Indépendants, Paris, 1921–1924
- Galerie Devambez, Paris, 1922
- Galerie Druet, Paris, June 1938
- The watercolors of André Villeboeuf, Galerie Charpentier, Paris, 1950 25, December 1951.
- School of Paris, Galerie Charpentier, Paris, 1956.
- Bullfighting art exhibition presented by the Pena de Bernui, Society of Southern Artists, Toulouse Arts Palace, May–June 1956.
- Galerie de l'Elysée (Alex Glass), Paris, during1955-1956.
- Claude Robert, auctioneer, of the André Villeboeuf workshop, Hôtel Drouot, Paris, May 17, 1982.

== Bibliography ==
- Pierre Lévy, Artists and a collector (Mémoires), Flammarion, 1976.
- Françoise de Perthuis, "Le Tour du monde d'André Villeboeuf", in La Gazette de l'Hotel Drouot, 14 May 1982 .Christophe Rameix, the School of Crozant, the painters of Creuse and Gargilesse, 1850–1950, Éditions Lucien Souny, 1991.
- André Roussard, Dictionary of Painters in Montmartre, Éditions André Roussard, 1999.
- Emmanuel Bénézit, Dictionary of painters, sculptors, draftsmen, engravers, volume 14, Gründ, 1999.
- Temas españoles en las letras y en el arte francés de hoy, Instituto francés en España, Madrid, 1957.
- Raymond Nacenta, L'École de Paris, Éditions Seghers, Paris, 1958, p. 352 .
- Claude Robert, auctioneer, 5 avenue d'Eylau, Paris, Catalog of the second auction of the André Villeboeuf workshop, Hôtel Drouot, Paris, MondayMay 17, 1982.
- Pierre Mornand, Twenty artists from the book, Éditions le Courrier Graphique, 1948, limited edition 1,800 numbered copies (introduction by Raymond Cogniat).
- Jean-Louis Vaudoyer (preface by Pierre Brisson ), André Villeboeuf, Éditions Galerie Charpentier, Paris, 1950.
- André Dunoyer de Segonzac, "Mon Ami André Villeboeuf", Le Figaro, 7 December 1968 .
- Françoise de Perthuis, "André Villeboeuf", in La Gazette de l'Hotel Drouot, 13 December 1968 .
- Marcus Osterwalder, Dictionary of illustrators, 3 volumes. Third volume, "1915–1965 – Nés avant 1900", Éditions Ides et Calendes, 2005.Pierre Mornand, The beautiful page over the centuries, Les Bibliolâtres de France editions, 1943.
- Pierre Mornand, "The artists of the book, André Villeboeuf", The Graphic Courier, n ^{o} 49, Paris, 1950.
