= André Rouveyre =

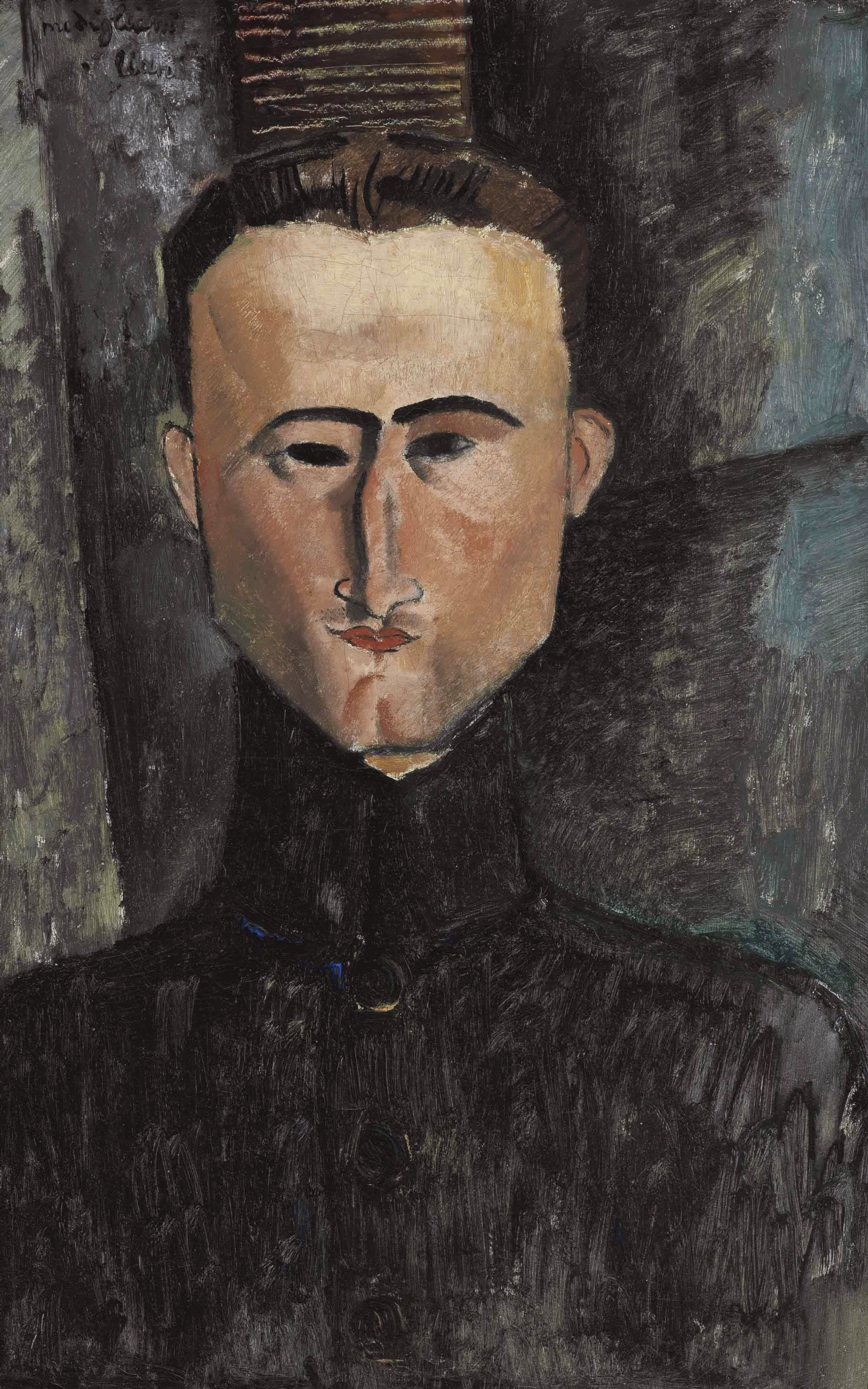
André Rouveyre (Amedeo Modigliani, 1915)

André Rouveyre (29 March 1879 – 18 December 1962) was an early twentieth-century French writer, caricaturist, and graphic artist. A member of several culturally elite circles of his day, he is perhaps equally remembered as the subject of drawings by prominent European artists Henri Matisse and Amedeo Modigliani.

Having met Matisse in Gustave Moreau's atelier in 1896, the two would continue a lifelong friendship that included hundreds of letters of published correspondence as well as collaboration on such works as Repli (1947) and Apollinaire (1953).

Rouveyre's own drawings show a mixture of early Minimalism (reminiscent of Matisse) with Expressionism. The caricatural nature of his work is aptly described by Aldous Huxley in the novel Crome Yellow when a character encounters his own unflattering portrait: "A mute, inglorious Rouveyre appeared in every one of those cruelly clear lines."

Rouveyre died in December 1962 in Barbizon, France.
