= Le Parnasse contemporain =

19th century poetic journal

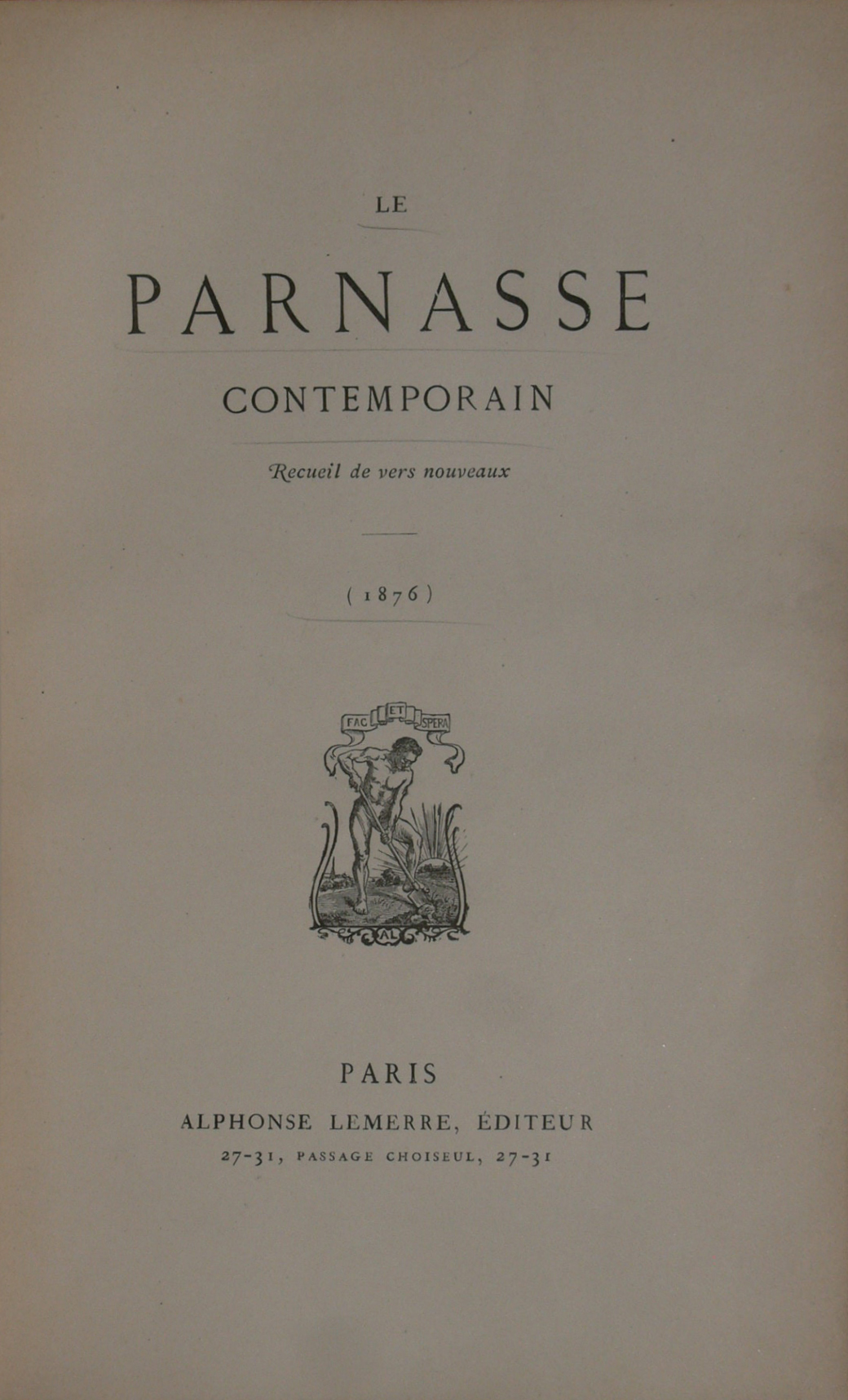
Third volume of Le Parnasse contemporain, 1876

Le Parnasse contemporain (French pronunciation: [lə paʁnas kɔ̃tɑ̃pɔʁɛ̃], "The Contemporary Parnassus", e.g., the contemporary poetry scene) is composed of three volumes of poetry collections, published in 1866, 1871 and 1876 by the editor Alphonse Lemerre. The volumes included one hundred French poets, such as Leconte de Lisle, Théodore de Banville, Heredia, Gautier, Catulle Mendès, Baudelaire, Sully Prudhomme, Mallarmé, François Coppée, Charles Cros, Nina de Callias, Léon Dierx, Louis Ménard, Verlaine, Villiers de L'Isle-Adam and Anatole France.

The mid/late 19th century French literary movement Parnassianism took its name from the poetry collection.

The first volume contained les Épaves and Nouvelles Fleurs du mal by Baudelaire, and early Mallarmé and Verlaine, avant-garde poets of the time. No poem by Arthur Rimbaud was included in any of the three volumes. Rimbaud is known to have read the first collection at a time when he was developing his poetry (sometime between 1866 and 1870). In a letter dated May 15, 1871 Rimbaud mentions by name dozens of poets who were included, referring to some of them as "idiots", "imbeciles", "schoolboys" et cetera. In that letter Rimbaud praises Charles Baudelaire, Theophile Gautier, Theodore de Banville, Leconte de Lisle, Albert Merat, and Paul Verlaine. He does not mention Mallarmé, who had 11 poems published in the 1866 collection.

== History ==
The idea of Le Parnasse contemporain began when the poet Louis-Xavier de Ricard was publishing a financially unsuccessful periodical, L'Art. He was advised by his friend and fellow poet Catulle Mendès to turn the weekly L'Art into an annual publication of only poems under the title Le Parnasse Contemporain. The first run of Le Parnasse Contemporain failed to secure a single subscriber. After the failed first run, Alphonse Lemerre took over the running of the publication, paid its various debts, and stewarded it into further publications.

== Information on each collection ==
	Editors	Number of installments date of publication of first and last installments shown, as well as the date of the publication of the collected installments	Number of poets	Number of poems	Total number of pages	Number of copies printed?
First collection (1866)	Directors: Louis-Xavier de Ricard; Catulle Mendès	18 livraisons; (du 3.03.1866 au 30.06.1866): collection published October 27th, 1866	37	200	287	500
Second collection (1871)	Président du Comité de publication : Leconte de Lisle	12 livraisons; (du 20.10.1869 à juillet 1871, interruption pendant la guerre de 70).: collection published in July 1871	56	169	401	
Third collection (1876)	Jury : Théodore de Banville; François Coppée; Anatole France	the third collection was not published in installments; collection published March 16th, 1876	63	221	451	
			99			

== List of 99 poets ==
The following table lists (in alphabetical order) 99 poets who contributed to La Parnasse contemporain. Indicated for each poet is the number of poems that appeared in the three collections (1866, 1871, 1876):

- Louise Ackermann (0-0-1)
- Jean Aicard (0-5-1)
- Armand d'Artois (0-0-2)
- Joseph Autran (0-0-1)
- Th. de Banville (2-12-24)
- Auguste Barbier (0-7-0)
- Ch. Baudelaire (16-0-0)
- Émile Bergerat (0-0-1)
- Guy de Binos (0-0-2)
- A.M. Blanchecotte (0-1-2)
- Émile Blémont (0-0-1)
- R. de Bonnières (0-0-4)
- Paul Bourget (0-0-4)
- Mélanie Bourotte (0-0-1)
- Philoxène Boyer (6-0-0)
- Jules Breton (0-0-2)
- Nina de Callias (0-2-0)
- Henri Cazalis (8-2-6)
- A. de Châtillon (1-0-0)
- Léon Cladel (0-1-3)
- Louise Colet (0-2-4)
- François Coppée (5-1-6)
- Charles Coran (4-3-0)
- Alexandre Cosnard (0-2-0)
- Charles Cros (0-2-0)
- Camille Delthil (0-0-2)
- Antoni Deschamps (8-1-0)
- Émile Deschamps (8-3-0)
- Léon Dierx (7-5-8)
- Alcide Dusolier (0-0-2)
- Alfred Des Essarts (0-2-0)
- Emmanuel des Essarts (4-1-2)
- F. Fertiault (3-0-0)
- Jules Forni (5-0-0)
- B. de Fourcaud (0-0-4)
- Anatole France (0-2-1)
- Théophile Gautier (6-4-0)
- Raoul Gineste (0-0-2)
- Albert Glatigny (0-4-0)
- Léon Grandet (0-2-0)
- Charles Grandmougin (0-0-2)
- Édouard Grenier (0-1-1)
  - Guy de Binos : voir Binos
- Isabelle Guyon (0-0-1)
- José-Maria de Heredia (6-1-25)
- Ernest d'Hervilly (0-3-7)
- Arsène Houssaye (11-0-0)
- Auguste Lacaussade (0-0-3)
- Georges Lafenestre (0-5-1)
- Victor de Laprade (0-1-2)
- Leconte de Lisle (10-1-1)
- Eugène Lefébure (6-1-0)
- André Lemoyne (4-3-1)
- Edmond Lepelletier (2-0-0)
- Robert Luzarche (4-2-0)
- Stéphane Mallarmé (11-1-0)
- Eugène Manuel (0-4-4)
- Gabriel Marc (0-4-1)
- Paul Marrot (0-0-1)
- Alexis Martin (1-0-0)
- Louis Ménard (6-7-0)
- Catulle Mendès (5-7-1)
- Albert Mérat (8-7-4)
- Achille Millien (0-0-1)
- Marc Monnier (0-0-4)
- Paul de Musset (0-0-1)
- Myrten (0-0-1)
- Mme Auguste Penquer (0-1-0)
- Laurent Pichat (0-1-0)
- Alexandre Piédagnel (2-0-0)
- Amédée Pigeon (0-0-5)
- Frédéric Plessis (0-4-12)
- Claudius Popelin (0-8-2)
- Gustave Pradelle (0-4-0)
- Louis Ratisbonne (0-0-2)
- Saint-Cyr de Rayssac (0-0-5)
- Armand Renaud (4-1-1)
- Henri Rey (0-1-0)
- Louis-Xavier de Ricard (10-2-1)
- N. Richardot (0-0-1)
- Gustave Ringal (0-0-4)
- C. Robinot-Bertrand (0-2-0)
- Maurice Rollinat (0-0-1)
- Sainte-Beuve (0-1-0)
- Louis Salles (0-3-1)
- Louisa Siefert (0-6-6)
- Armand Silvestre (0-3-6)
- Josephin Soulary (0-2-6)
- Sully Prudhomme (4-5-1)
- Maurice Talmeyr (0-0-1)
- Francis Tesson (1-0-0)
- André Theuriet (0-2-1)
- Auguste Vacquerie (3-0-0)
- Antony Valabrègue (0-1-6)
- Léon Valade (5-4-4)
- Paul Verlaine (8-5-0)
- Gabriel Vicaire (0-0-7)
- Eugène Villemin (1-0-0)
- Villiers de L'Isle-Adam (3-1-0)
- Henry Winter (2-0-0).
