= Henri Duparc (composer) =

French composer (1848–1933)

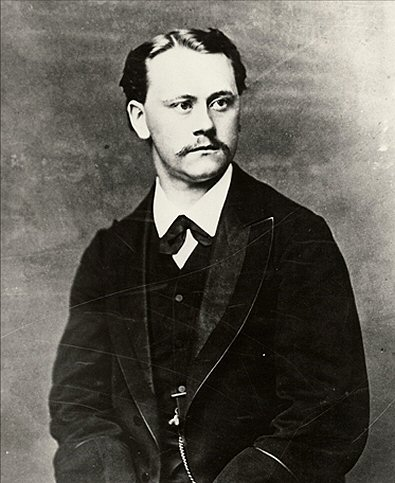
- Henri Duparc 1880
- Born: Eugène Marie Henri Fouques Duparc; 21 January 1848; Paris, France
- Died: 12 February 1933 (aged 85); Mont-de-Marsan, France
- Education: Jesuit College
- Occupation: Composer
- Era: Late Romantic period
- Known for: Classical Art Song

Eugène Marie Henri Fouques Duparc (21 January 1848 – 12 February 1933) was a French classical composer of the late Romantic period. He is best known for his mélodies (art songs).

Duparc was not intended for a musical career, but the piano teacher at his Paris school was César Franck, who went on to give him lessons in composition. In 1871 the two became founder-members of the Société nationale de musique, co-chaired by Camille Saint-Saëns and Romain Bussine to promote new French music.

He was a perfectionist and destroyed many of his compositions, and he ceased composing altogether in 1885, afflicted with a neurasthenic condition, but his surviving legacy of songs is ranked with those of Gabriel Fauré and Claude Debussy as typifying French mélodie in the closing decades of the nineteenth century.

== Life and career ==
=== Early years ===
Duparc was born on 21 January 1848 in the first arrondissement of Paris, the younger son of Louis Charles Fouques Duparc – a senior public servant – and his wife Amélie, née de Guait, who wrote books of religious instruction and visited jails to teach the catechism to the prisoners. The parents expected Duparc to become a lawyer, and he was sent to the Jesuit College in the Vaugirard district. Already there were signs of a nervous disorder: he had severe headaches and went through a phase of sleepwalking. The college was not intended to train young men for a musical career, and there is no firm evidence that Duparc was inclined to take his piano lessons any more seriously than his other studies. But Laurence Davies observes in his study of French music The Gallic Muse that the piano teacher was César Franck and "it remains hard not to suspect that an influence – baleful or otherwise – was at work". Franck gave Duparc his earliest musical experiences: the music of Bach, Gluck, Beethoven, Schubert and Schumann.

While still at school he began a little set of Six rêveries (1864), which suggest the influence of Mendelssohn's Songs without Words. Later, Duparc studied composition privately with Franck, who subsequently recalled him as "the most gifted of my pupils". and dedicated his Symphony in D minor to him. Duparc was intensely self-critical then and later, and he destroyed a great deal of his orchestral and chamber music. He did not neglect his legal studies and became a qualified avocat.

The first of the sixteen solo songs by Duparc that survive, Chanson triste, dates from 1868 or 1869. In 1869, together with his close friend Vincent d'Indy (a fellow pupil of Franck), Duparc attended Wagner performances in Munich and, as a guest of Franz Liszt, he met Wagner in the same year at Weimar. Like many contemporary French composers – Fauré excepted – he was greatly influenced by Wagner's music. In 1870 he published five songs (Cinq mélodies, Opus 2). Two of them, "Soupir" and "Chanson triste", were later incorporated in his collection of songs, written between 1868 and 1884, including eight with orchestral accompaniment.

Following military service in the Franco-Prussian War of 1870–1871, Duparc married Ellen MacSwiney, on 8 November 1871. (Note: Some sources state that MacSwiney was from Scotland, but official records show that she was born in Macroom in Ireland.) The couple had two sons: Marie Henri Charles, born in 1872, and Marie Valentin Léon, born in 1874.

=== Peak years ===
In 1871 Duparc became a founder-member of the Société nationale de musique, co-chaired by Camille Saint-Saëns and Romain Bussine to promote new French music. Other founder-members included Georges Bizet, Emmanuel Chabrier, d'Indy, Fauré, Franck, Édouard Lalo and Jules Massenet.

Two orchestral pieces by Duparc survive – the symphonic poems Lénore and Aux étoiles. The former, dedicated to Franck, was first performed in 1875 at the Société nationale. It was then taken up by Jules Pasdeloup, Édouard Colonne, Charles Lamoureux and by the orchestra of the Société des Concerts du Conservatoire. After Eugène Ysaÿe conducted the work in London, a local critic wrote:

Henri Duparc's Symphonic Poem Lenore proved highly interesting … it is founded on Bürger's celebrated ballad and is intended to be descriptive of Leonore's weird ride with her phantom lover. The themes are striking and well developed, while the scoring is admirable. The music is thoroughly modern in style and suggests the influence of César Franck, to whom the work is dedicated.

Duparc is known to have destroyed at least two other orchestral compositions. Only one of his songs, La vague et la cloche, was conceived with orchestral accompaniment. In the article on Duparc in Grove's Dictionary of Music and Musicians, Martin Cooper writes that the song is not as strictly unified as the songs composed with piano accompaniment.

Together with Chabrier, Duparc visited Bayreuth in 1879. Cooper writes that Duparc tried to persuade Wagner to abandon the realistic, pictorial production of his works in favour of a simple symbolism – "in this, as in other aesthetic matters, he was in advance of his times". The commentator Étienne Jardin has suggested that Duparc's persistent self-denigration may have been partly due to the tension between his French identity and his fascination with Wagner.

Cooper writes that Duparc was among the earliest French admirers of War and Peace, Ibsen’s plays, French primitive painting and oriental art, theatre and dance. He loved the works of Dante and Mistral and was an early champion of Baudelaire and Verlaine. Despite differences in style, Duparc and Fauré held each other in high regard. Duparc dedicated the tragic Lamento to "mon maître et ami G. Fauré", but Fauré changed the word maître – master – in the manuscript to read élève – pupil.

=== Later years ===
In 1885 Duparc gave up composition. The cause was a neurasthenic condition, thought to be physical in origin but possibly exacerbated by his obsessive perfectionism. He led a very quiet but otherwise normal life, practising as a lawyer and serving as mayor of Marnes-la-Coquette. He continued to read, to draw and paint and to listen to – but not to compose – music. He spent most of his later years in La Tour-de-Peilz, near Vevey in Switzerland, where the young conductor Ernest Ansermet, acting under Duparc's direction, orchestrated three of the composer's best-known mélodies: "Phydilé", "La Vie ancienne", and "L'Invitation au Voyage". A visit to Lourdes in 1906 increased his already deep religious feelings, but his eyesight deteriorated to the point of blindness during the following years.

Duparc died in Mont-de-Marsan, in south-western France, on 12 February 1933 at the age of 85. He was buried at Père Lachaise Cemetery in Paris.

== Music ==
Although Duparc composed a Cello Sonata, several piano pieces, a motet for three voices and organ, and the symphonic poem Lénore (1875), his reputation rests on his seventeen surviving mélodies. He had a keen interest in literature, and chose to set verses by writers including Prudhomme, Baudelaire, Gautier and, in translation, Goethe. His best-known songs are Chanson triste, Soupir, Extase, Élégie, Phidylé and the two Baudelaire settings L’Invitation au voyage and La Vie antérieure – the last being the final work he completed, in 1884.

The obituarist in Le Figaro wrote:

Duparc left behind a perfect and great body of work. His melodies rival the finest lieder of Schubert and Schumann. He endowed French music with several masterpieces.

Baker's Biographical Dictionary of Musicians says of Duparc: "Remarkable French composer of songs … Between 1868 and 1885 he composed a series of innovative songs, distinguished by exquisitely phrased melodies in fluid modal harmonies". Grove describes French mélodie in the closing decades of the nineteenth century as typified by the songs of Fauré, Duparc and Debussy.

The article on the mélodie in Grove's Dictionary states that Duparc's Cinq mélodies op.2 (1869) show the influence of Gounod (in the arpeggios and subtle syncopations), Liszt (in the juxtaposition of distant chords), and Wagner (in the appoggiaturas and chromaticisms). The article adds that these characteristics occur again in Duparc's later songs, "many of which express profound melancholy":

His vocal lines are intensely expressive, often using augmented intervals, but it is in the piano part, full of dissonant non-harmonic notes and rhythmic complications, that the essence of Duparc's style lies; harmonically he went far beyond the clear triadic arpeggios of his predecessors.
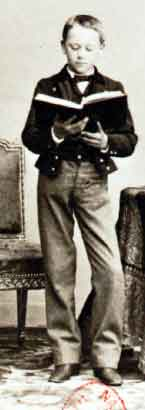
Duparc at age 10,
in 1858

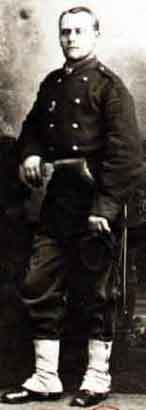
Duparc in uniform during the Franco-Prussian War in 1870

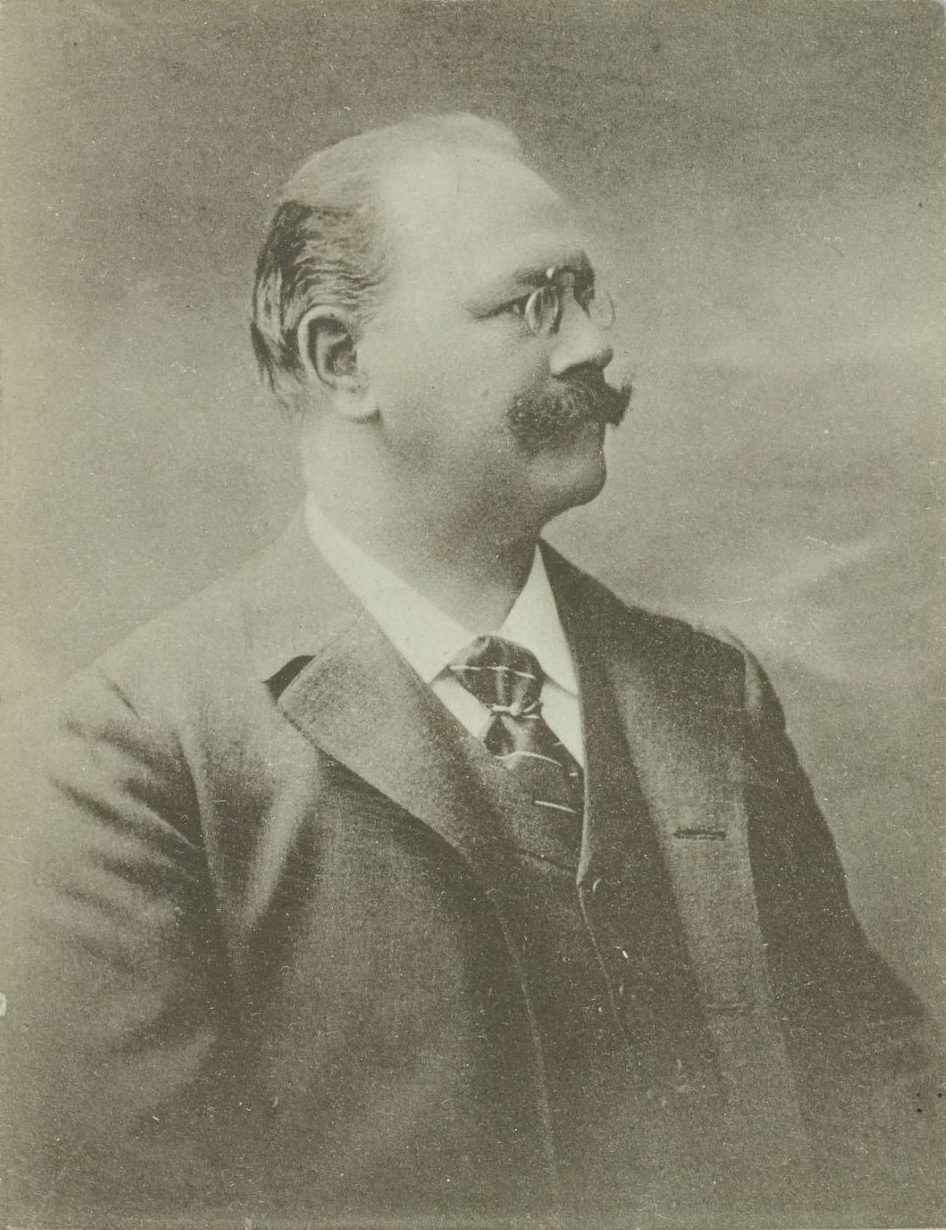
Duparc
in middle age

== Works ==
Catalogue of works by Henri Duparc
Year	Composition	Notes	Type of Work
1863-65	Six rêveries, pour piano	Printed, but unpublished. Private collection of Mme. d'Armagnac, granddaughter of Duparc.	Piano solo
1867	Sonate pour violoncelle et piano	Premiered in 1948. Private collection of Mme. d'Armagnac, granddaughter of Duparc.	Cello & piano
1867-69	Feuilles volantes, pour piano		Piano solo
1868	Chanson triste	Published as: Op. 2, no. 4. Text by Jean Lahor.	Voice & piano (orchestrated 1912)
1869	Le galop	Published as: Op. 2, no. 5. Text by Sully Prudhomme. Released in 1948.	Voice & piano
1869	Romance de Mignon	Published as: Op. 2, no. 3. Text by Victor Wilder, based on « Kennst du das Land » by Goethe).	Voice & piano
1869	Sérénade	Published as: Op. 2, no. 2. Text by Gabriel Marc.	Voice & piano
1869	Soupir	Published as: Op. 2, no. 1. Text by Sully Prudhomme. Revised 1902.	Voice & piano
1869	Cinq mélodies, op. 2		Voice & piano
1869	Beaulieu, pour piano	Private collection of Mme. d'Armagnac, granddaughter of Duparc.	Piano solo
1869-70	Au pays où se fait la guerre	Text by Théophile Gautier. Original title: Absence. Definitive version, 1911–13.	Voice & piano (orchestrated 1876)
1870	L'invitation au voyage	Text by Charles Baudelaire. Released in 1872.	Voice & piano (orchestrated 1892–95)
1871	La fuite, duo pour soprano et ténor avec piano	Published as: Op. 2, no. 6.	Duet for voice & piano
1871	La vague et la cloche	Text by François Coppée. Released in 1873.	Voice & piano (Orchestrated)
1872	Suite d'orchestre	(Lost).	Orchestral suite
1872-82	Phidylé	Text by Leconte de Lisle. Released in 1889	Voice & piano (orchestrated, 1891–92)
1873	Laendler, suite de valses pour orchestre	(Destroyed).	Orchestral suite
1873	Laendler (version for two pianos)		Two pianos
1874	Poème nocturne : I. Aux étoiles - II. Lutins et follets - III. Duo: L’aurore	Part lost, only: I. Aux étoiles is extant. Premiered in Paris on 11 April 1874 at the Société Nationale de Musique Moderne.	Orchestral work
1874	Elégie	Text by Ellen MacSwiney (wife of Duparc) after Thomas Moore.	Voice & piano
1874	Extase	Text by Jean Lahor. Released 1882. Revised 1884.	Voice & piano
1875	Lénore	Based on the ballad of the same name by Gottfried August Bürger.	Symphonic poem
1875	Lénore (version for two pianos)	transcription for 2 pianos (1884) by Camille Saint-Saëns	Two pianos
1877	Suite pour le piano	(Lost).	Piano solo
1879	Le manoir de Rosemonde	Text by Robert de Bonnières	Voice & piano (orchestrated 1912)
1879-95	Roussalka, opéra en trois actes	Unfinished. Based on Русалка (Rusalka), an unfinished dramatic poem by Alexander Pushkin. Destroyed except for "Absence," republished as "Au pays où se fait la guerre".	Opera in 3 acts
1880	Sérénade florentine	Text by Jean Lahor. Released 1882.	Voice & piano
1882	Benedicat vobis Dominus	Motet for three mixed voices and organ (or piano).	Choral music
1883	Lamento	Text by Théophile Gautier.	Voice & piano
1883	Testament	Text by Paul Armand Silvestre. Released in 1898.	Voice & piano (orchestrated 1900–02)
1884	La vie antérieure	Text by Charles Baudelaire.	Voice & piano (orchestrated 1911–13)
1886	Recueillement	Unfinished. (Destroyed).	Voice & piano?
1892	Danse lente	Extract from Roussalka. Copied by Ernest Ansermet. Preserved by Éditions Salabert.	Orchestral work
1903	Transcription of two works for organ by J.S. Bach: Prélude and fugue in E minor ("Cathedral"), BWV 513; Prélude and fugue in A minor ("The Great"), BWV 543		Two pianos
1908	Transcription of six organ works by César Franck		Two pianos
1910	Aux étoiles, pour piano	Also: version for piano four hands, & version for organ. Revised 1911.	Piano solo
1911	Aux étoiles	Entr'acte for an unpublished drama.	Orchestral work
(n.d.)	Transcription of a work for organ by J.S. Bach: Chorale Prélude and Fugue: In dir ist Freude, BWV 615	Private collection of Ernest Ansermet	Two pianos

== Recordings ==
Individual songs by Duparc feature on numerous recordings by female singers including Janet Baker, Régine Crespin, Victoria de los Ángeles, Renée Fleming, Véronique Gens, Magdalena Kožená, Lotte Lehman, Karita Mattila, Nellie Melba, Jessye Norman, Kiri Te Kanawa and Maggie Teyte, and by male singers including Gabriel Bacquier, Hugues Cuénod, Nicolai Gedda, Wolfgang Holzmair, Camille Maurane, Ruggero Raimondi, Joseph Rouleau and Gérard Souzay.

Complete or substantially complete sets of the songs have been recorded by

Performers	Label	Number	Year
Thomas Allen, Sarah Walker, Roger Vignoles	Hyperion	00602458154931	1989
Gerald Finley, Catherine Robbin, Stephen Ralls	CBC	MVCD1148	2002
Paul Groves, Emily Pulley, Roger Vignoles	Naxos	8.557219	2004
Véronique Dietschy, Emmanuel Strosser	Universal	00028946548820	2007
Michèle Losier, Daniel Blumenthal,	Fuga Libera	FUG552	2009
Mireille Delunsch, Guy Flechter, François Kerdoncuff, Vincent Le Texier	Timpani	1C1180	2010
Andrea Mastroni, Mattia Ometto	Brilliant	BC95299	2015
Sarah Connolly, Huw Montague Rendall, Nicky Spence, William Thomas, Malcolm Martineau	Signum	SIGCD715	2022
Eirik Grøtvedt, John Lidal, Ann-Beth Solvang	LAWO	7090020184555	2026

== Bibliography ==
=== Recordings of Music by Henri Duparc ===
- L'Amour et la Mort, MDG 908 2378-6, www.mdg.de, 2026

=== Writings by Henri Duparc (in French) ===
- César Franck pendant le Siège de Paris, in « Revue musicale », Paris, December 1922.
- Souvenirs de la Société Nationale, in « Revue de la Société internationale de Musique », Paris, December 1912.

=== Letters (in French) ===
- Lettre à Chausson, in « Revue musicale », December 1925.
- Duparc Henri : Une Amitié mystique, d'après ses lettres à Francis Jammes. (Preface and comments by G. Ferchault). Mercure de France, Paris, 1944.
- Gérard, Y. (Ed.). Lettres de Henri Duparc à Ernest Chausson, in « Revue de Musicologie » (N° 38) 1956, p. 125.
- Sérieyx, M.-L. (Ed.). Vincent d’Indy, Henri Duparc, Albert Roussel : lettres à Auguste Sérieyx. Lausanne, 1961.

=== Monographs on Duparc (in French) ===
- Northcote, S. The Songs of Henri Duparc. London: D. Dobson, 1949. 124 pp.
- Van der Elst, N. Henri Duparc : l’homme et son oeuvre. (Thesis). Paris: Université de Paris, 1972, & Utrecht, 1972.
- Fabre, M. L'image de Henri Duparc dans sa correspondence avec Jean Cras. 1973.

=== Other articles and writings about Duparc (in French) ===
- Fellot, H. Lieder français : Henri Duparc, in « Revue Musicale de Lyon ». Lyon, 30 March 1904.
- Chantavoine, J. Henri Duparc, in « La Revue Hebdomadaire », Paris, 5 May 1906.
- Aubry, G.-J. Henri Duparc, in « La vie musicale de Lausanne », Lausanne, 1 February 1908.
- Jammes, Francis. L'Amour, les Muses et la Chasse, in « Mercure de France », Paris, 1922, p. 172 et al.
- Fauré, Gabriel. Opinions musicales. Paris: Rieder, 1930.
- Imbert, M. Henri Duparc, in « La Petite Maîtrise », Schola Cantorum de París, March 1933.
- Ansermet, Ernest. Un émouvant témoignage sur la destinée d'Henri Duparc, in « Revue Musicale », Paris, April 1933.
- Bréville, P. Henri Fouques Duparc 1848-1933, in « La Musique Française », Paris, May 1933.
- Merle, F. Psychologie et Pathologie d'un artiste: Henri Duparc. Bordeaux: Imprimerie de l'Université (Bordeaux), 1933.
- Oulmont, C. Henri Duparc, ou de L'Invitation au Voyage à la Vie éternelle. Paris: Desclée de Brouwer & Cie, 1935.
- Oulmont, C. Un Duparc inconnu, in « Revue musicale », Paris, July–August 1935.
- Stricker, R. Henri Duparc et ses mélodies. (Thesis). Paris: Conservatoire national de musique, 1961.
- Rigault, J.-L. Les mélodies de Duparc, Autour de la mélodie française. Rouen, 1987, p. 71-86.
- Stricker, R. Les mélodies de Duparc. Arles, 1996.

== Notes, references and sources ==
=== Sources ===
- Davies, Laurence (1967). The Gallic Muse. London: Dent. OCLC 955377.
- Hudry, François (1983). Ernest Ansermet, pionnier de la musique (in French). Lausanne: Éditions de l'Aire. OCLC 10273132.
- Jardin, Etienne (2023). Aux étoiles: French Symphonic Poems. Venice: Palazzetto Bru Zane – Centre de musique romantique française. OCLC 1420371680.
- Jones, J. Barrie (1989). Gabriel Fauré: A Life in Letters. London: B T Batsford. ISBN 0-7134-5468-7.
- Nectoux, Jean-Michel (1991). Gabriel Fauré: A Musical Life. Cambridge: Cambridge University Press. ISBN 0-521-23524-3.
- Nichols, Roger (2022). The Complete Songs of Duparc. London: Signum. OCLC 1345510168.
- Northcote, Sydney (1959). The Songs of Henri Duparc. New York: Roy Publishers. OCLC 17710018.
- Sackville-West, Edward; Desmond Shawe-Taylor (1955). The Record Guide. London: Collins. OCLC 474839729.
- Slonimsky, Nicolas; Laura Kuhn, eds. (2001). Baker's Biographical Dictionary of Music and Musicians. Vol. 2. New York: Schirmer. ISBN 978-0-02-865530-7.
- Stacey, Anne-Marie (1971). The Mélodies of Henri Duparc. Toronto: University of Alberta Libraries. OCLC 1240474549.
- Vallas, Léon (1949). César Franck. London: Dobson. OCLC 822701291.
