= Georges Lafenestre =

French poet, art critic and art historian

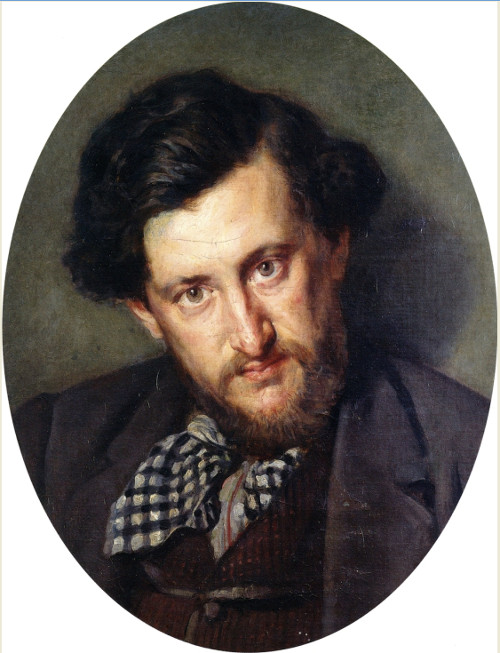
Georges Lafenestre, by Marcellin Desboutin (1865)

Georges Lafenestre (5 May 1837, Orléans - 19 May 1919, Bourg-la-Reine) was a French poet, art critic and art historian.

== Biography ==
His career was devoted to administering the fine arts, as a Conservator at the Louvre, and a member of the Institut de France, where he bequeathed a significant collection of photographs of Italian art to the Institut's museum.

In 1866, he married Isabelle Bénédite, née Lisbonne (born 1840), the widow of businessman Samuel Bénédite (c.1826-1865); mother of Georges Bénédite and Léonce Bénédite, who followed their step-father into the fields of art history and curation. Together, they had a son named Pierre, who apparently died as a child.

He was a close friend of Jose-Maria de Heredia, who later became the librarian at the Bibliothèque de l'Arsenal, and made the acquaintance of several other Parnassians through him. This, in turn, made the publisher Alphonse Lemerre aware of his work, and he was invited to participate in creating the now famous anthology, Le Parnasse contemporain.

In 1892, he was elected a member of the Académie des Beaux-Arts, where he took Seat #4 in the "Unattached" section. He held that position until his death, and was succeeded by the Vicomte de Castelnau.

== Sources ==
- Paul Verlaine, "Georges Lafenestre", In: Les Hommes d'aujourd'hui, #398, (Online @ French Wikisource)
- Géraldine Masson, "Georges Lafenestre, le Poète Conservateur", In: Revue d'Histoire littéraire de la France, Vol.119, #3, 2019 (Online @ JSTOR)
- Jessica Desclaux, "Dans l’atelier des cours de Georges Lafenestre", In: Le Collège de France et le musée du Louvre (Full text @ OpenEdition)
