= Popelin =

Popelin may refer to:

People

- Claudius Popelin (1825–1892), French writer, painter, and poet included in Le Parnasse contemporain
- Marie Popelin (1846–1913), Belgian feminist, educator and advocate

Other

- Popelín, a village and municipality (obec) in Jindřichův Hradec District, South Bohemian Region, Czech Republic
- 11090 Popelin (1994 CT12), a main-belt asteroid discovered on 1994 by E. W. Elst

== See also ==
- Poplin
