= Louis-Xavier de Ricard =

French poet, author and journalist (1843–1911)

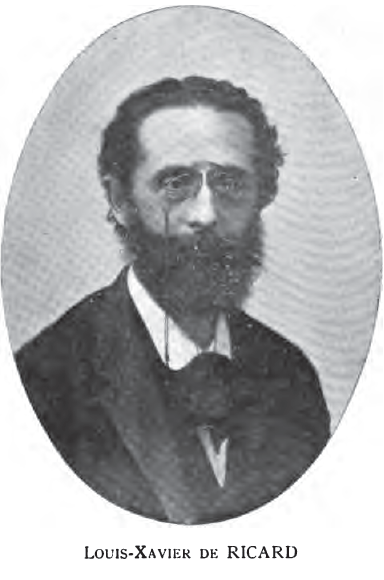
- Born: 25 January 1843; Fontenay-sous-Bois
- Died: July 2, 1911; Marseille
- Occupation: Poet, author, journalist
- Genre: Parnassianism, Romanticism

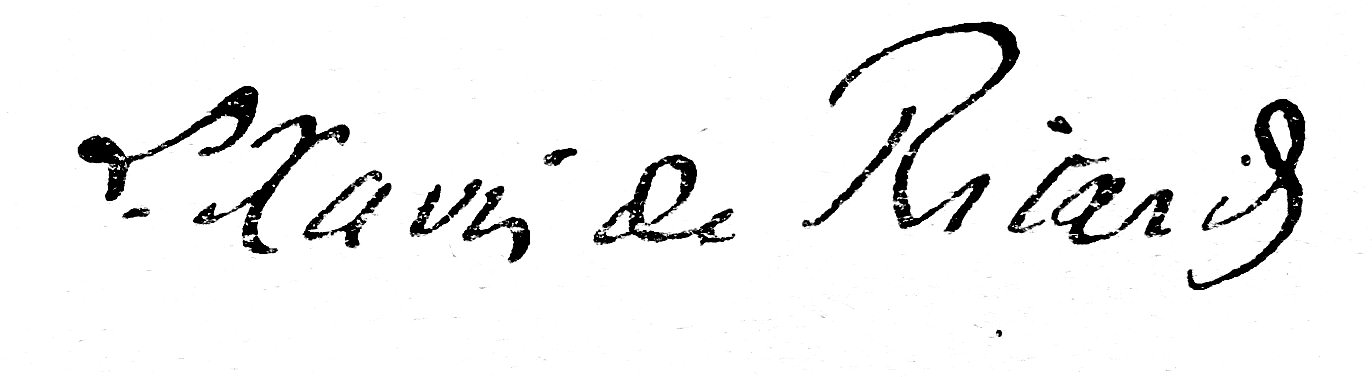
Signature of Louis-Xavier de Ricard

Louis-Xavier de Ricard (January 25, 1843 – July 2, 1911) was a French poet, author, and journalist of the 19th century. He was founder and editor of La Revue du progrès (La Revue du Progrès moral, littéraire, scientifique et artistique) which was the first to publish a poem by Paul Verlaine in August 1863. He and Catulle Mendès edited the first volume of Le Parnasse contemporain, published by Alphonse Lemerre in 1866. He was a member of the Commune de Paris (1871) and Félibrige, a group founded by Frédéric Mistral to promote and defend Provençal literature and the Provençal language (a Langue d'oc language).

== Life ==
His father was general and marquis Joseph-Barthélemy de Ricard (who successively served Napoléon I, then the Bourbons and finally was premier aide-de-camp of Jérôme Bonaparte in 1852).

Ricard's first collection of poetry, Les chants de l'aube (Songs of Dawn) was published in 1862 by Poulet-Malassis. In March 1863, after receiving an inheritance from an aunt, he founded La Revue du progrès. Among the contributors to the Revue were Charles Longuet and a young Paul Verlaine (his first published poem). The Revue lasted one year; the atheist sentiments of the Revue lead to a Monseigneur Dupanloup taking legal action against the Revue on the grounds that it was an outrage to public morals and good mores. Ricard was defended by a talented young attorney, Léon Gambetta, and was sentenced to eight months in prison, reduced to three, at Sainte Pélagie, and had to pay a fine of 1,200 francs. After serving his sentence, his friends manifested an active support, and this small group of supporters was the origin of the politico-literary salon that met every Friday at the home of Ricard's mother, 10 Boulevard des Batignolles. Ricard was happy to entertain these boisterous republican and anti-clerical youths. Many great French poets and writers of the future attended: Anatole France, Sully Prudhomme, Villiers de l'Isle-Adam, Paul Verlaine, François Coppée; and Raoul Rigault, the future attorney of the Commune de Paris (1871).

In March 1866, Ricard and Catulle Mendès were appointed by editor Alphonse Lemerre to be directors of a now famous and pivotal collection of poetry called Le Parnasse contemporain, a collection that gave the name Parnassian to a group of poets that came to be known as Parnassians. Ricard also contributed 8 poems to that first collection. In 1867 Verlaine, a friend of Ricard (whom he called "an excellent Langue d'Ocian poet"), dedicated his Les Vaincus to Ricard, a poem on the vanquished of 1848.

== Works ==
- Histoire mondaine du Second Empire : en attendant l'Impératrice, 1852-1853; Paris : Librairie Universelle, 1904. OCLC 10515481
- Madame de la Valette, Paris, Société d'éditions littéraires et artistiques, 1901. OCLC 10610896
- Les Sept péchés capitaux : la colère, Paris : E. Bernard, 1901. OCLC 12095932
- Officier de fortune ! : aventures de Marie-Armand de Guerry de Maubreuil, Paris, Montgredien, 1899. OCLC 77622550
- L'esprit politique de la Réforme., Paris, Fischbacher, 1893. OCLC 47194338
- Un poète national : Auguste Fourès, Paris, 1888. OCLC 66947569
- Le fédéralisme,, Paris, Sandoz & Fischbacher, 1877. OCLC 11707407
- Ciel, rue et foyer,, Paris, Lemerre, 1866. OCLC 44540708
- La résurrection de la Pologne, Paris, Marpon, 1863. OCLC 47114061
- Petits mémoires d'un Parnassien, coll. Avant-siècle, Paris, Lettres modernes - Minard, 1967. Ce livre contient également Les Parnassiens, d'Adolphe Racot. Introductions et commentaires de Michael Pakenham OCLC 1409870
