= Phidylé =

Phidylé is a mélodie by the French composer Henri Duparc, dedicated to his friend Ernest Chausson. It is a setting of a poem with the same title from Poèmes et poésies (1858) by the French Parnassian poet Leconte de Lisle. (Note: Note that Leconte de Lisle wrote another poem with the same title which he included in his Poèmes antiques. That poem was set by Reynaldo Hahn.) Duparc first completed a setting for high male voice and piano (1882), and then orchestrated it (1891-1892). The music, which shows the influence of Wagnerian voice leading and chromaticism, progressively rises from languid tranquillity to the singer's triumphant climax, accompanied by heavy chords and tremolos in the piano, before a solo postlude for the piano which gradually dies to a pianissimo finish. It has been suggested that Phidylé was inspired by Gabriel Fauré's 1870 mélodie Lydia, also a setting of a poem by Leconte de Lisle.
