= Nina de Callias =

French composer, pianist, writer and salon hostess

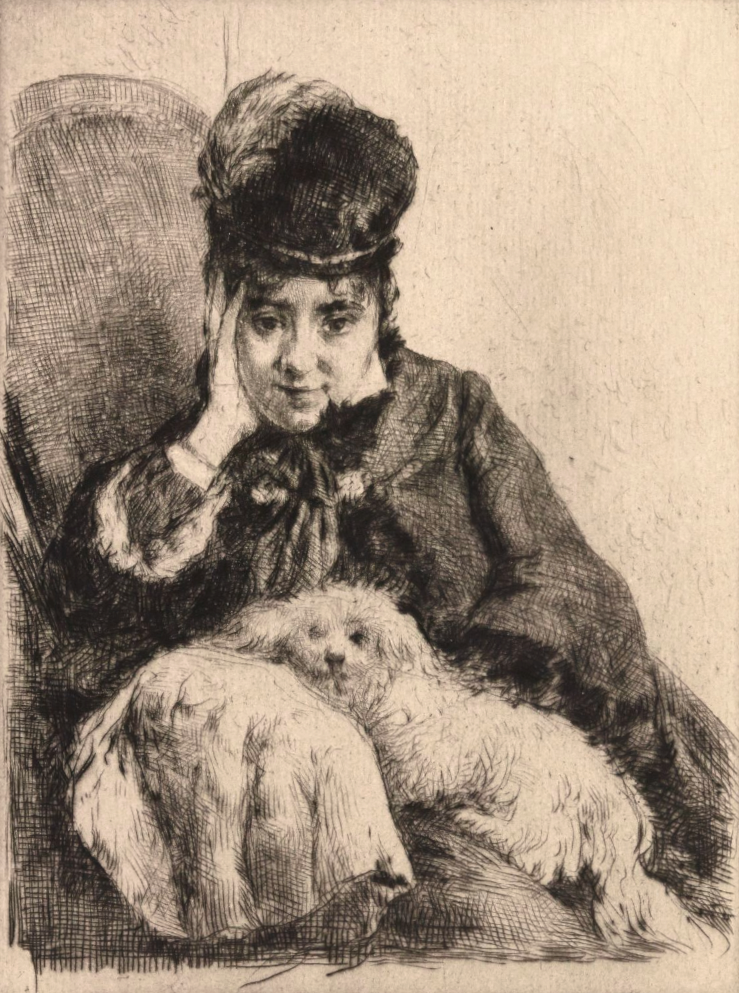
- De Callias (1879) by Desboutin
- Born: 12 July 1843; Vanves, Paris, France
- Died: 22 July 1884 (aged 41)
- Other names: Anne-Marie Gaillard, Nina de Villard
- Known for: Hostess, pianist, composer, poet, actress

Anne-Marie Gaillard (12 July 1843 – 22 July 1884), known as Nina de Villard de Callias, Nina de Callias or Nina de Villard, was a hostess, pianist, composer, poet, actress, and artist's model. Her musical career, starting in childhood, along with her love of the theatre arts was aided by her personality and hostess abilities. Known for her parties and dinners, de Callias mingled with many famous actors, poets, playwrights, and philosophers. She is most famous as the model for Édouard Manet's La Dame aux éventails, and was a critic herself of the Impressionist Exhibition of 1881.

== Early life ==
Anne-Marie Gaillard was born on 12 July 1843 in Vanves. The daughter of a rich Lyon lawyer, by the age of thirteen, she was acting in plays for playwright Henri de Bornier, and by fifteen was invited as a usual guest to Madame Beulé's (wife of the secretary of the Académie des Beaux-Arts) salons, putting her into contact with those at the Académie des Beaux-Arts. In 1859, Gaillard visited the annual Vichy spa, a gathering started by Napoléon III that included a program of activities surrounding his visiting, and bathed at the town's spas as they were said to provide good health to those who utilized them. During these gatherings Gaillard took part in dances and musical performances.

In November 1864, Gaillard married Hector de Callias, a count, writer, and journalist for Le Figaro, but she separated from him in 1868 due to his alcoholic and violent tendencies. After the separation, de Callias used her mother's maiden name Villard in her work.

== As a salon hostess ==
After her marriage to de Callias, she hosted one of the most prominent literary and artistic salons of Paris. One guest was poet Charles Cros with whom she had a decade-long love affair (1867-1877), which inspired many of his works such as his book Coffret de santal and play Le Moine-bleu which was co-written by Germain Nouveau, Jules Richepin, and de Callias herself.

Guests who attended her salons included Hector Berlioz, Edgar Degas, Anatole France, Augusta Holmes, Manet, Arthur Rimbaud, and Richard Wagner, Marie Deschamps, Virginie Huet (organist), Emmanual des Essarts, Francès (actor and singer), among others. By 1869 she was hosting young poets, including Stéphane Mallarmé, Catulle Mendés, Arthur Rimbaud, and Paul Verlaine in search of new forms of expression, known collectively as the Parnassians.

De Callias was known to have kept multiple autograph albums, only some of which have survived, that kept a log of who had attended her gatherings. At these events, she performed her own songs on piano and invited other artists to perform with her, attracting large crowds of high profile guests. Often more people than could fit comfortably packed into the room to see these plays and performances. Afterwards, de Callias had dinner ready for the guests.

Noteworthy salons:

- 16 December 1868 afterparty for concert at the Théâtre de l'École lyrique (the landlord gave her notice for noise, but she did not stop having parties, she just paid the fines).
- 14 January 1869 afterparty for François Coppée's play Le Passant (Actors Agar and Sarah Bernhardt attended).

On 11 March 1869 an article about de Callias was published by Anatole France in La Vogue parisienne stating that she was "an ideal and dizzying pianist" and "graceful and fiercely beautiful." De Callias was known for her bold personality which sometimes, did not come off as very lady-like. Edmond de Goncourt referred to her salon as a "salon of mental breakdown" and called de Callias a "slightly demented muse." These parties put de Callias into contact with many high-ranking and talented artists and writers, many of whom she collaborated with or inspired.

De Callias inspired many artist and writer's works during this period, including Verlaine and Coppée's sonnets about her stardom in 1869, Léon Dierx's lead character in his book La Rencontre in 1874, and Charles Cros's assorted works detailed above.

De Callias also created some of her own works including a poem inspired by Charles Cros, "L'Archet" that was published in La Réforme in 1869. She co-wrote the second volume of Le Parnasse contemporain with Anatole France in 1869, and also co-wrote a one act play, La Dompteuse with France.

The Franco-Prussian War forced de Callias to flee with her mother to Geneva. She stayed three years before returning to Paris in 1873 to revive the artistic circles there.

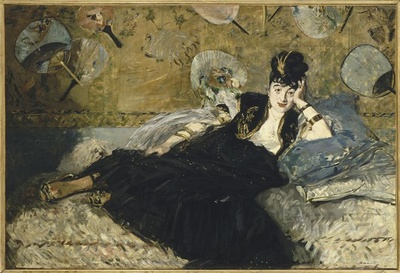
La Dame aux éventails, 1873, by Édouard Manet

== Friendship with Manet ==
Édouard Manet, who frequently attended her salons, became a close friend to de Callias and she posed for several of his artworks. De Callias's address of 44 rue de Londres and Manet's address of 49 rue de St Pétersbourg made them neighbors. Their close proximity made it convenient for the two to visit each other. A sketch of de Callias was reproduced in the Revue du monde nouveau in February 1874, by friend of the two, Charles Cros.

Close connections with Cros and Manet brought the three together often at de Callias' house in August 1874 (Cros worked there, using it as a studio most days). The best known work depicting de Callias is Manet's La Dame aux éventails. This bohemian depiction of de Callias reclining led her ex-husband Hector de Callias to write to Manet forbidding him from showing the portrait at the Paris Salon because he did not want the de Callias name tied to it.

De Callias later dated artist Franc-Lamy, a friend of Manet and Pierre-Auguste Renoir. Two portraits of de Callias were shown at the Salon of 1879: a dry-point by Marcellin Desboutin and a drawing by Franc-Lamy.

== As a poet and critic ==
Her creative work was mostly performed or published as it was written. Her poem "Mon Testament," republished in 1869 as "Le Testament d'une grande dame" was well-known, but that title change upset Villard as she did not see herself or wish to be portrayed as a grande dame.

While in Geneva from 1870–73, she was a consultant in Baden Baden for the French political newspaper La Réforme, and wrote an article with writer Edmond Bazire for La Suisse Radicale in 1872. She also published poems in La Parodie during this time. Back in France, she contributed to the collective anthology Dixains Réalistes and to the circle known as The Hydropaths, a group considered to be a vital link in the development of Symbolism.

In 1876 she had a series of poems inspired by Coppée published in Dixains réalistes.

She also reviewed the Impressionist Exhibition of 1881, praising Edgar Degas' Petite danseuse de quatorze ans, while most critics were appalled by the piece. Other works by de Callias include La Duchesse Diane (1882), La Jalousie du jeune Dieu, and Tristan & Iseult.

De Callias died on 22 July 1884. In the time leading up to her death, her mental health had been declining and her consumption of alcohol increasing. She died in a mental hospital.

Many of de Callias' poems were published in Feuillets parisiens in 1885 after her death.

== As a composer ==
De Callias performed in multiple concert halls and other venues throughout her career, but two frequently cited performances are a charity concert in Le Havre on October 19, 1868 and her concert at the Théâtre de l'Ecole lyrique on December 16, 1868. La Press musicale praised Villard's poetry and musical performances equating her energy when performing to that of French fury. Works as a composer include:

- Fantaisie sur Rigoletto
- Nocturne
- Romance
- Souvenir de Vichy
- Valse Brillante
- Grand Galop
- Gallop, La Lanterne
- Paroles d'une rose à un rayon de soleil (w/ Bosworth)
