= Alphonse Lemerre =

French editor, and publisher (1838–1912)

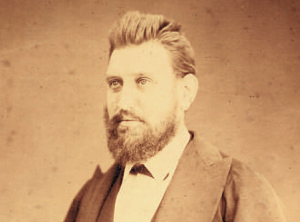
Alphonse Lemerre

Alphonse Lemerre (French pronunciation: [alfɔ̃s ləmɛʁ]; Canisy, Normandy, France, 1838 – Paris, France, 1912) was a 19th-century French editor and publisher, known especially for having been the first to publish many of the Parnassian poets. Lemerre's imprints popularized the Elzévir type derived from the Roman-inspired work of Louis Perrin from Lyon.

== Life ==
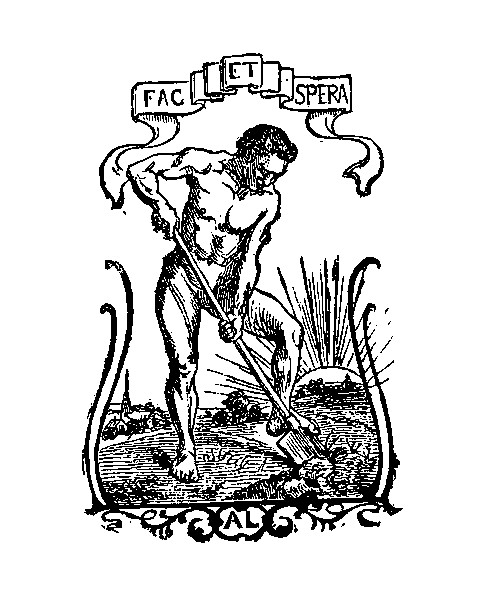
Alphonse Lemerre's publisher's mark

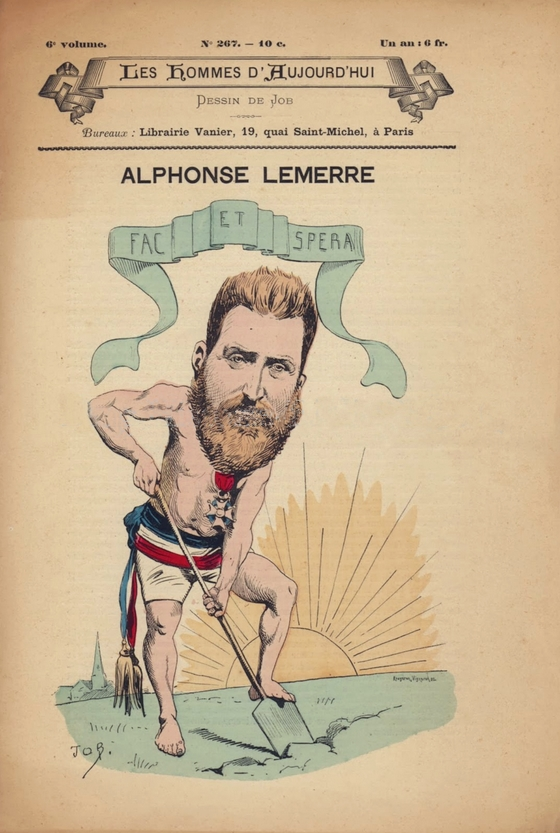
Caricature of Lemerre, by Job (1886)

Alphonse Lemerre was the eighth child of his parents. In 1850, at age 12, he was an errand-boy in Saint-Lô. In 1860, he moved to Paris and quickly rose to prominence, becoming the "Prince de l'édition" (Prince of Publishing) and made his publisher's mark famous, which had the Latin motto Fac et spera ("Agis et espère" in French, "Do and Hope" in English). He opened a bookshop at 23 passage Choiseul. His shop also occupied other odd number addresses (23-33, 47).

In 1865, he began to edit Parnassian poets in Louis-Xavier de Ricard's revue L'Art, which had ten issues between November 2, 1865, and January 6, 1866. The November issue had an article by Paul Verlaine about Baudelaire. In 1866, Lemerre published Le Parnasse contemporain, a collection of new poetry, in 18 weekly installments from 30 March to 30 June 1866, the collected installments published in October. Two other volumes of Le Parnasse contemporain appeared in 1871 and 1876.

He went on to publish numerous collections. Lemerre's publications include many of the chefs-d'œuvre of 19th century French literature and history: Anatole France, Auguste Molinier, Louis Petit de Julleville; la Petite Bibliothèque littéraire, la Bibliothèque des curieux, la Bibliothèque illustrée, la Bibliothèque dramatique, la Petite collection pour la jeunesse, les poèmes nationaux, des livres d'enseignement and other collections.

He was a mayor of Ville d'Avray, republican and anticlerical in politics. He was very attached to his native Normandy. He went there often (to Canisy, to the Château de Montmirel and to Coutainville) and had several properties there (Dangy, Dais, Méterville).

In 1965, the inheritors of his estate closed the Lemerre publishing house.

== Selection of authors edited by Alphonse Lemerre ==
Alphonse Lemerre is especially known for having published Parnassian poets. But he also published Classical and Romantic authors and anthologies.

- Théodore de Banville
- François Coppée
- Léon Dierx
- Théophile Gautier
- José-Maria de Heredia
- Jean Lahor
- Victor de Laprade
- Charles Marie René Leconte de Lisle
- Catulle Mendès
- Alfred de Musset
- Sully Prudhomme
- Raymond Roussel
- Paul Verlaine
- Renée Vivien

Collections:

- Le Parnasse contemporain, recueil de vers nouveaux. I- 1866, II- 1869-1871, III- 1876

Anthologies:

- Anthologie des poètes français depuis les origines jusqu'à la fin du XVIIIe siècle.
- Anthologie des poètes français, XIXe siècle.
- Sonnets et eaux fortes, 1869, premier livre de peintres paru en France grâce au critique d'art Philippe Burty.
- Le Livre des Sonnets.
- Le Livre des Ballades.
