= Laevius =

Latin poet (d. 80 BCE)

Laevius (died c. 80 BC?) was a Latin poet, of whom practically nothing is known.

The earliest reference to him is perhaps in Suetonius (De grammaticis, 3), though it is not certain that the Laevius Milissus or Melissus there referred to is the same person. Definite references do not occur before the 2nd century (Fronto, Ep. ad ~k~. Caes. i. 3; Aulus Gellius, Noctes Atticae ii. 24, Xii. 10, XjX. 9 Apuleius, De magia, 30; Porphyrion, Ad Horat. carm. iii. 1, 2).

Some sixty miscellaneous lines are preserved (see Baehrens, Fragm. poet. rom. pp. 287–293), from which it is difficult to see how ancient critics could have regarded him as the master of Ovid or Catullus. Gellius and Ausonius state that he composed an Erotopaegnia, and in other sources he is credited with Adonis, Alcestis, Centaurs, Helena, Ino, Protesilaudamia, Sirenocirca and Phoenix, which may, however, be only the parts of the Erotopaegnia. They were not serious poems, but light and often licentious skits on the heroic myths.

The 5th-century CE Roman writer Macrobius quotes a writer named Laevinus in his Saturnalia, whose identity is unknown. This may be a fragment of Laevius' work as well. In it, he compares Aphrodite to the Moon, in that both are nurturing goddesses and both have elements of gender ambiguity.

== Sources ==
- O. Ribbeck, Geschichte der römischen Dichtung, i.
- H. de la Ville de Mirmont, Étude biographique et littéraire sur le poète Laevius (Paris, 1900), with critical edition of the fragments, and remarks on vocabulary and syntax
- A. Weichert, Poetarum latinorum reliquiae (Leipzig, 1830)
- Pulz, Erik (2023). Laevius – ein altlateinischer Liebesdichter: Studien, Text und Interpretationskommentar (1. Auflage ed.). Berlin Boston: De Gruyter. ISBN 9783111236438.
- M. Schanz, Geschichte der römischen Literatur (2nd edition), pt. i. p. 163
- W. Teuffel, Hist. of Roman Literature (Eng. tr.), 150, 4
- summary in F. Plessis, La Poésie latine (1909), pp. 139–142.
