= Lemerre =

Lemerre is a surname. Notable people with the surname include:

- Alphonse Lemerre (1838–1912), French editor and publisher
- Roger Lemerre (born 1941), French football player and manager
