= Louisa Siefert =

French poet

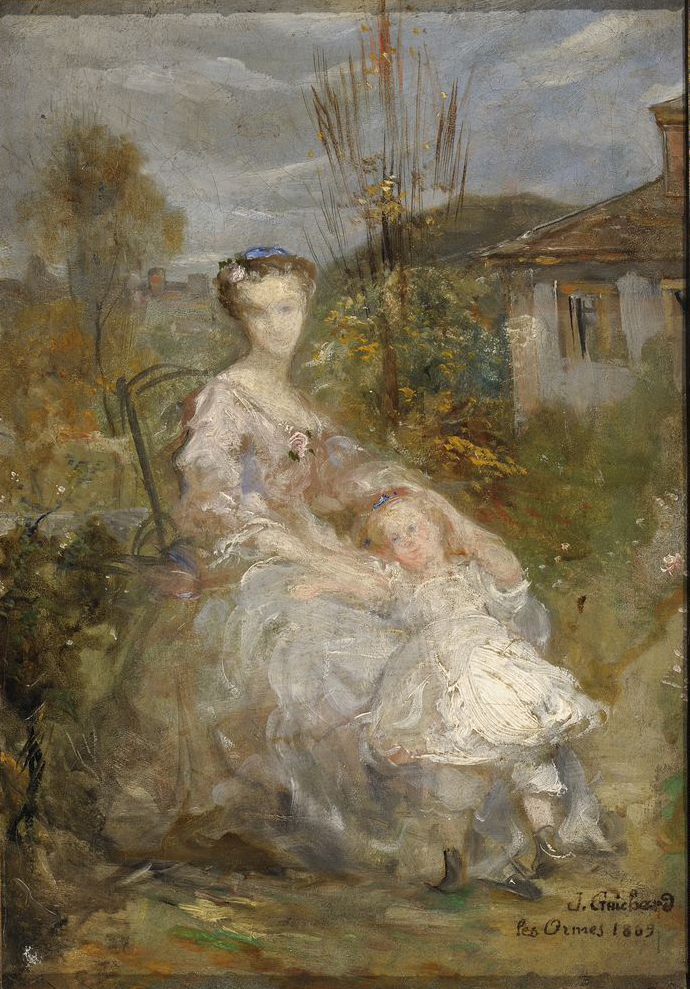
- Louisa Siefert at Ormes, by Joseph Guichard
- Born: 1845; Lyon, France
- Died: October 1877 (aged 31–32); Pau, France
- Writing career
- Genre: poetry

Louisa Siefert (1845 – October 1877) was a best-selling 19th century French poet.

The daughter of Henry Siefert, vice-consul to Portugal, and Adele-Adrienne Belz, she was born and grew up in Lyon. Her first book of poems Rayons perdus was published in December 1868; the first edition sold out quickly and two more editions appeared by April 1869. She wrote a literary column for the Journal de Lyon. In 1876, she married Jocelyn Pene, Emilio Castelar's secretary. Siefert suffered from migraines and severe arthritis during her short life and died of tuberculosis in Pau at the age of 32.

Her work was included in the second volume of Le Parnasse contemporain. Her poetry was viewed favorably by Rimbaud. In Un poète oublié, Lucien Scheler described Siefert's life as "une vie illuminé par la beauté du verbe" (a life illuminated by the beauty of the verb).

== Selected works ==
- L'Année républicaine, poetry (1869)
- Les Stoïques, poetry (1870)
- Les Saintes Colères, poetry (1871)
- Comédies romanesques, play in verse (1872)
- Méline, novel (1875)
- Souvenirs, Poésies inédites, poetry (1881)
