= Albert Mérat =

French poet

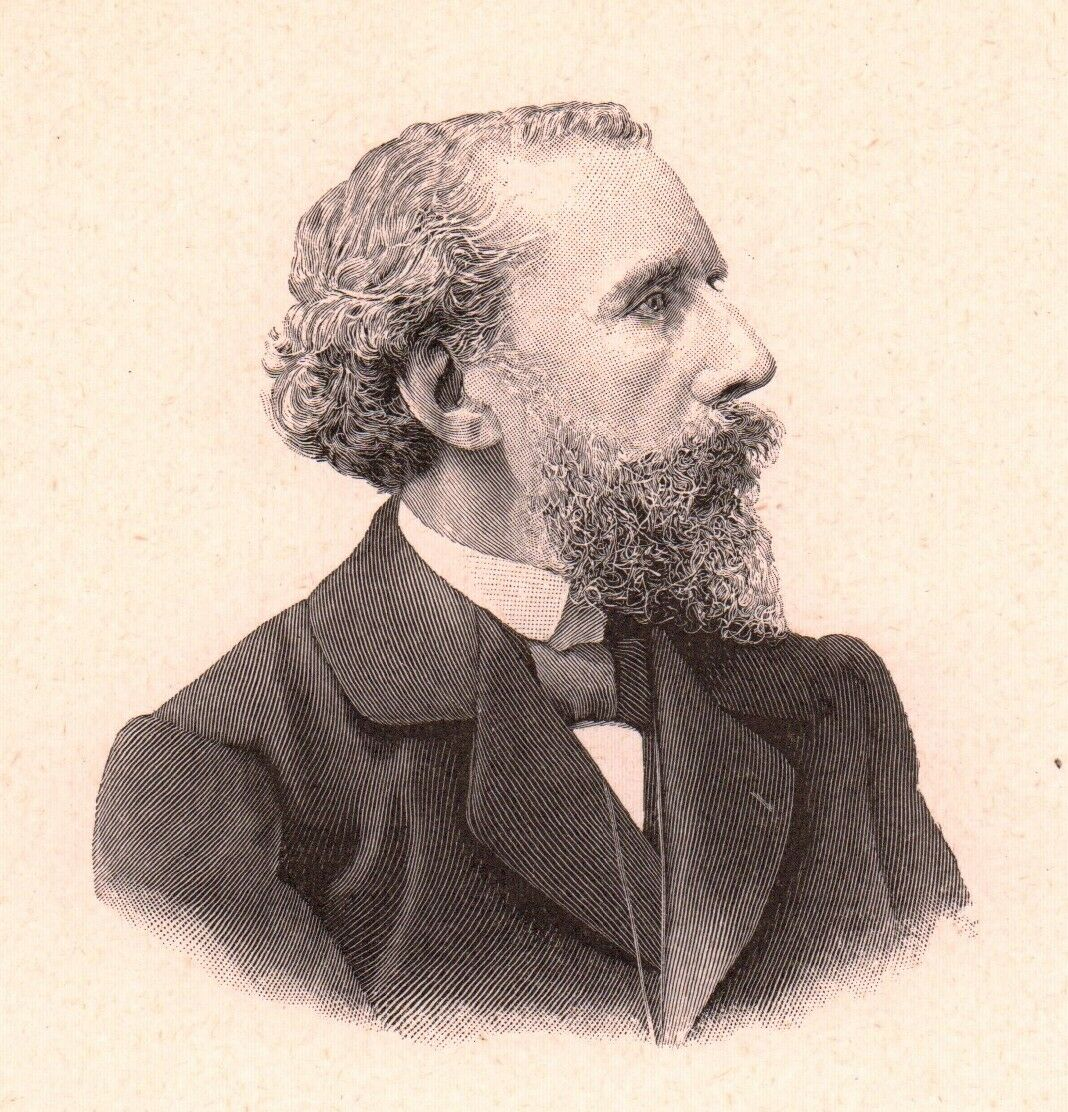
- Born: 23 March 1840; Troyes, France
- Died: 16 January 1909 (aged 68); 14th arrondissement of Paris
- Burial place: Cimetière du Montparnasse
- Occupations: Poet, writer, translator
- Awards: prix Archon-Despérouses (1901), Knight of the Legion of Honour, prize Maillé Latour Landry (1866), Prix Lambert (1874)

Signature
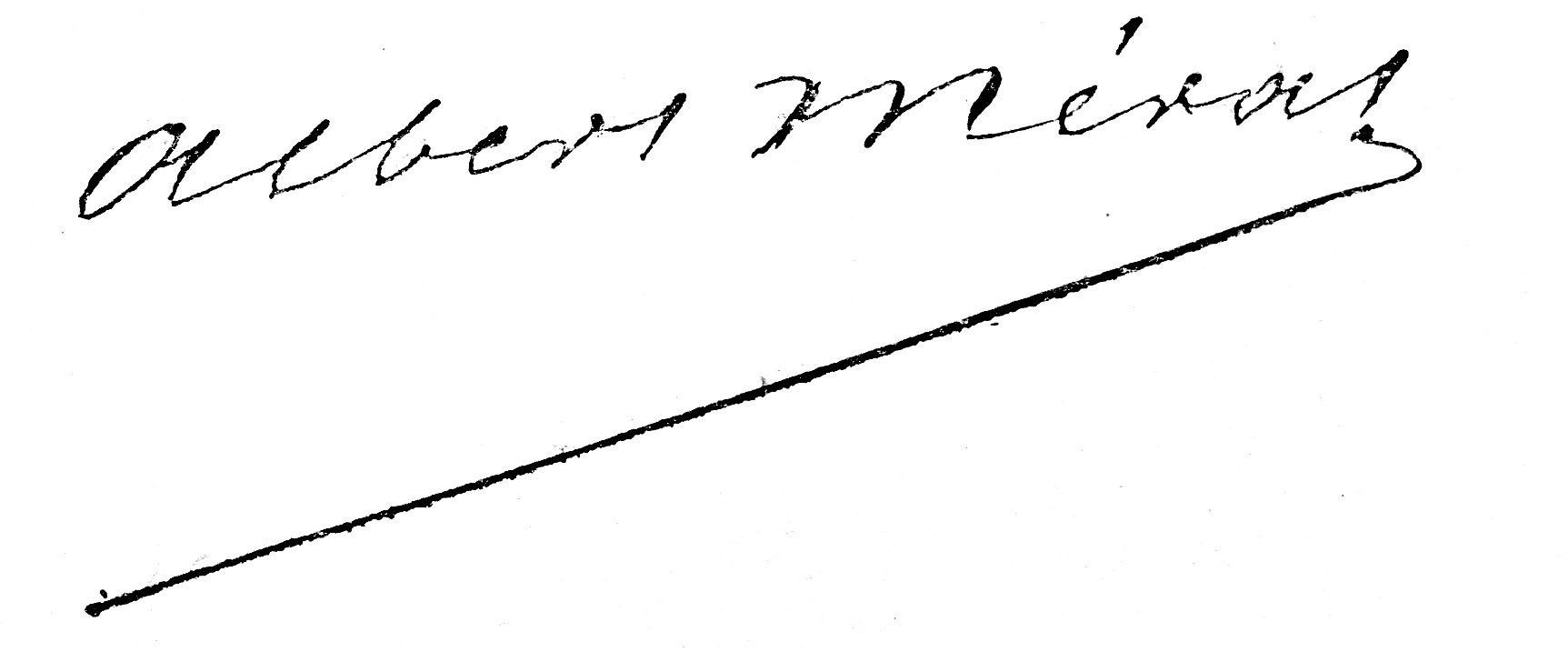

Albert Mérat (23 March 1840, Troyes, France – 16 January 1909, Paris, France) was a French poet.

== Biography ==
Albert Mérat was born in Troyes into a family of lawyers. He initially studied law, then entered the civil service as a clerk in the offices of the Seine prefecture. It was there that he met Paul Verlaine and Léon Valade. In 1863, he wrote his first collection Avril, mai, juin, sonnets with Valade.

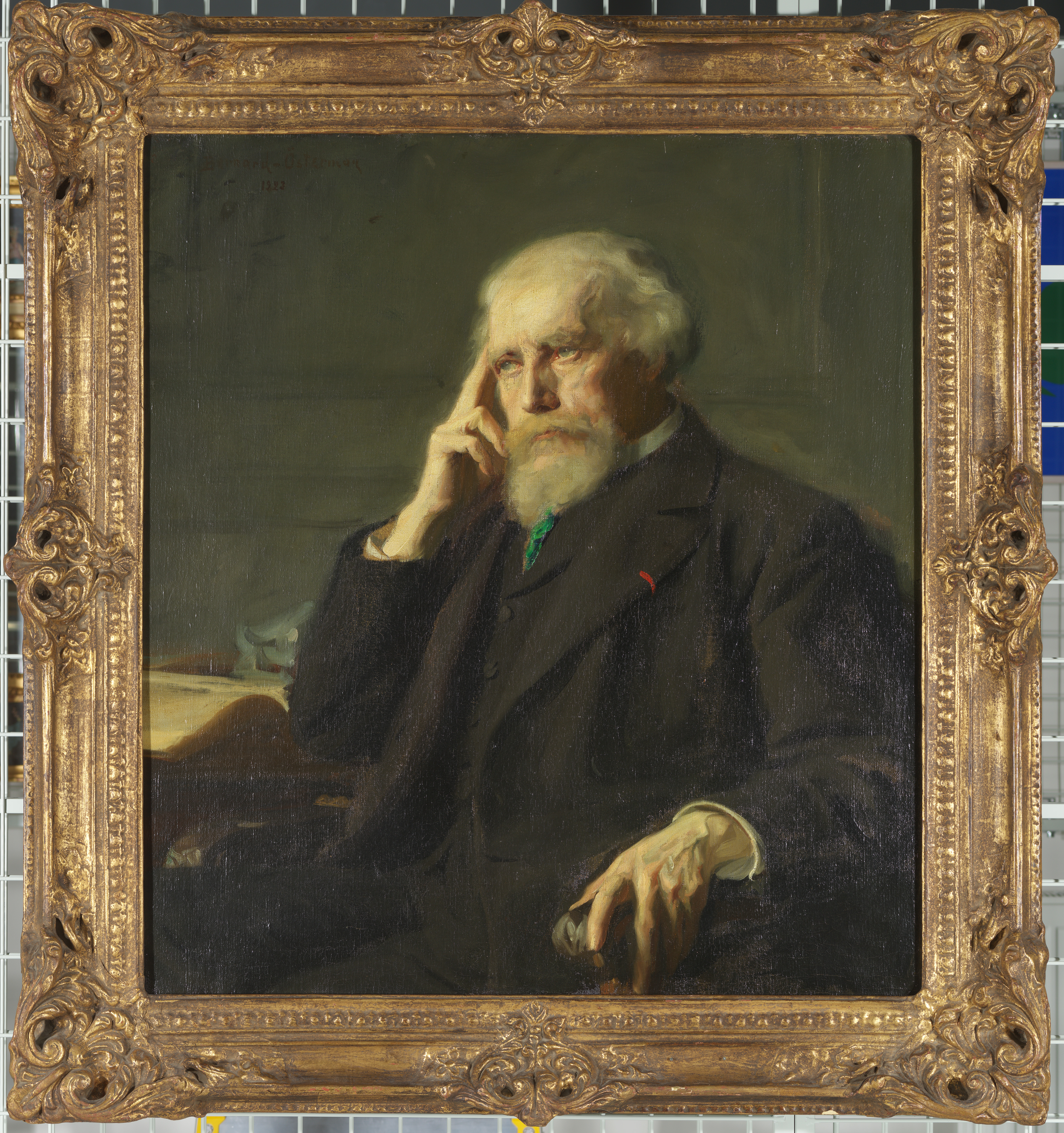
Portrait by Bernhard Österman.

He was part of the Parnassian poets, like Théophile Gautier, José-Maria de Heredia, Théodore de Banville. He was praised by the poets of his time; Arthur Rimbaud, in his letter to Paul Demeny dated May 15, 1871, considered him visionary and almost equal to Verlaine, who dedicated his poem Jadis to him. Following a dispute with Rimbaud during a dinner at the Vilains Bonshommes, Mérat refused to pose for Fantin-Latour on his famous painting The Corner of the Table (French: Un coin de table). His name and work seem to have remained, and still remain, unknown to the general public.

Around 1875, he became attached to the presidency of the Senate in Luxembourg. After two decades without publications, he returned to poetry by publishing about ten collections. In the last years of his life, he was a librarian at the Senate palace. His mental health deteriorated, and he was hospitalized at the Maison de Santé de la Glacière, probably the future Hôpital Sainte Anne. The next morning, January 16, 1909, he was found "dead, his head wrapped in his eiderdown, his temple twice pierced, with such care that the beautiful Olympian mask, which he held so dear, was not damaged, and that sudden death had scarcely altered his features."

Albert Mérat was decorated as a Knight of the Legion of Honor. Henri-Léopold Lévy painted his portrait.

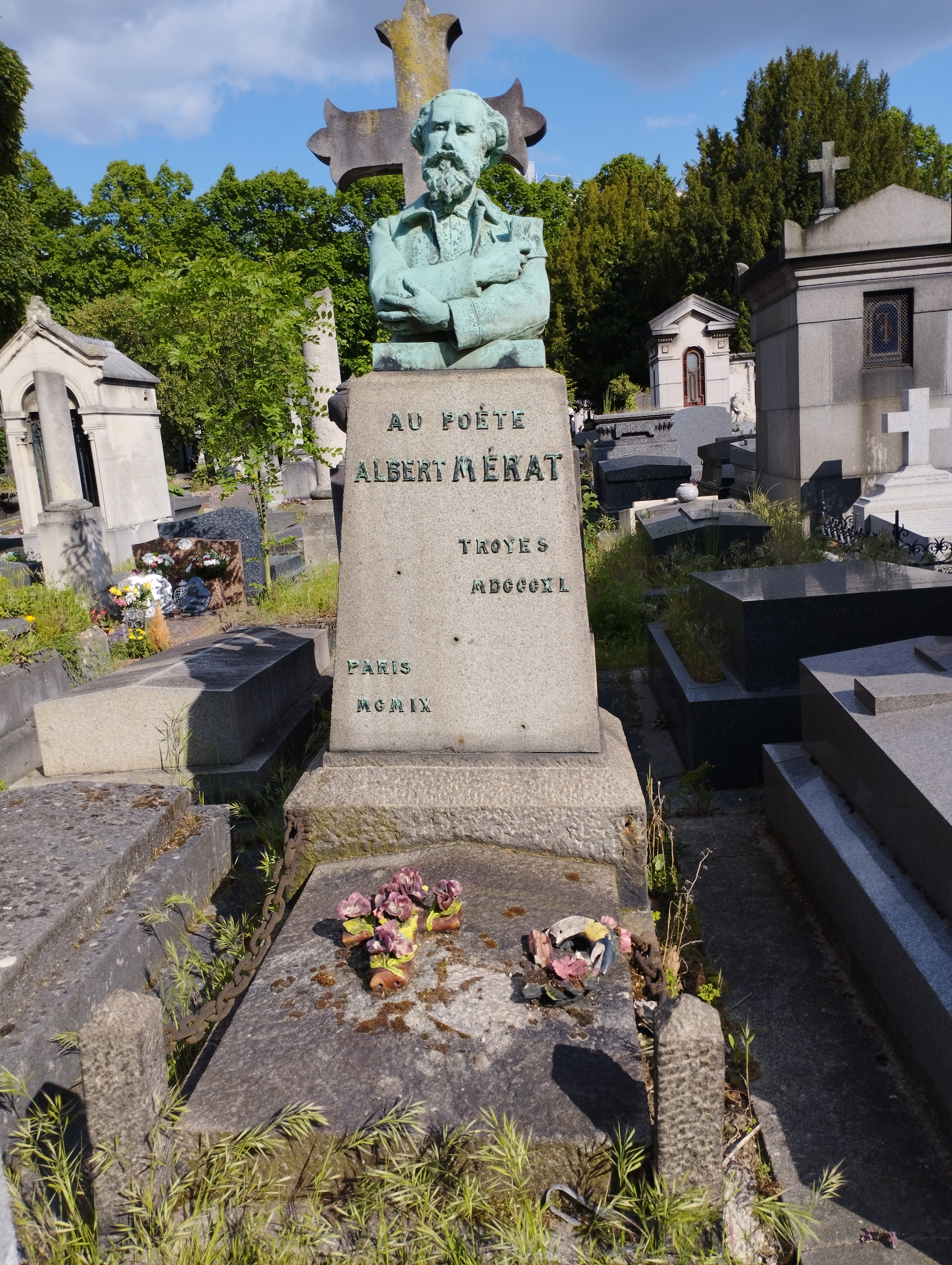
Grave of Albert Mérat at the Cimetière du Montparnasse (division 27, small cemetery).

He is buried at the Cimetière du Montparnasse (27th division). His bronze bust by Alphonse Saladin adorns his tomb.

== Works ==
- Avril, mai, juin, sonnets (1863)
- Les Chimères: sonnets; Le livre de l'amie; Tableaux de voyage (1866)
- L'Idole (1869)
- Translation into French of L'Intermezzo, by Henri Heine, in collaboration with Léon Valade.
- Les Villes de marbre, poèmes (1869) poems crowned by the French Academy
- Les Souvenirs (1872)
- L'Adieu (1873)
- Printemps passé, poème parisien (1876)
- Au fil de l'eau (1877)
- Poèmes de Paris; Parisiennes; Tableaux et paysages parisiens (1880)
- Poésies de Albert Mérat, 1866–1873. Les Chimères. L'Idole. Les Souvenirs. Les Villes de marbre (1898)
- Vers le soir. Impressions et souvenirs. Intermède. Petit poème. Hommes et choses (1900)
- Triolet des Parisiennes de Paris (1901)
- Les Joies de l'heure: choses passées, le coin des poètes, impressions et notes d'art, deux peintres, conseils du poète à lui-même (1902)
- Chansons et madrigaux: chansons, madrigaux, camées parisiens (1902)
- Vers oubliés: chansons d'été, fleurs d'avril (1902)
- Petit Poème (1903)
- Les Trente-six quatrains à Madame (1903)

== Literary Awards ==
- 1866 prix Maillé-Latour-Landry from the French Academy for Les Chimères: sonnets; Le livre de l'amie; Tableaux de voyage
- 1874 prix Lambert from the French Academy
- 1901 prix Archon-Despérouses from the French Academy for Vers le soir. Impressions et souvenirs. Intermède. Petit poème. Hommes et choses

== Bibliography ==
- Paul Verlaine, Albert Mérat, monograph published in the magazine Les Hommes d'aujourd'hui, No. 396;
