= Frédéric Plessis =

French writer (1851–1942)

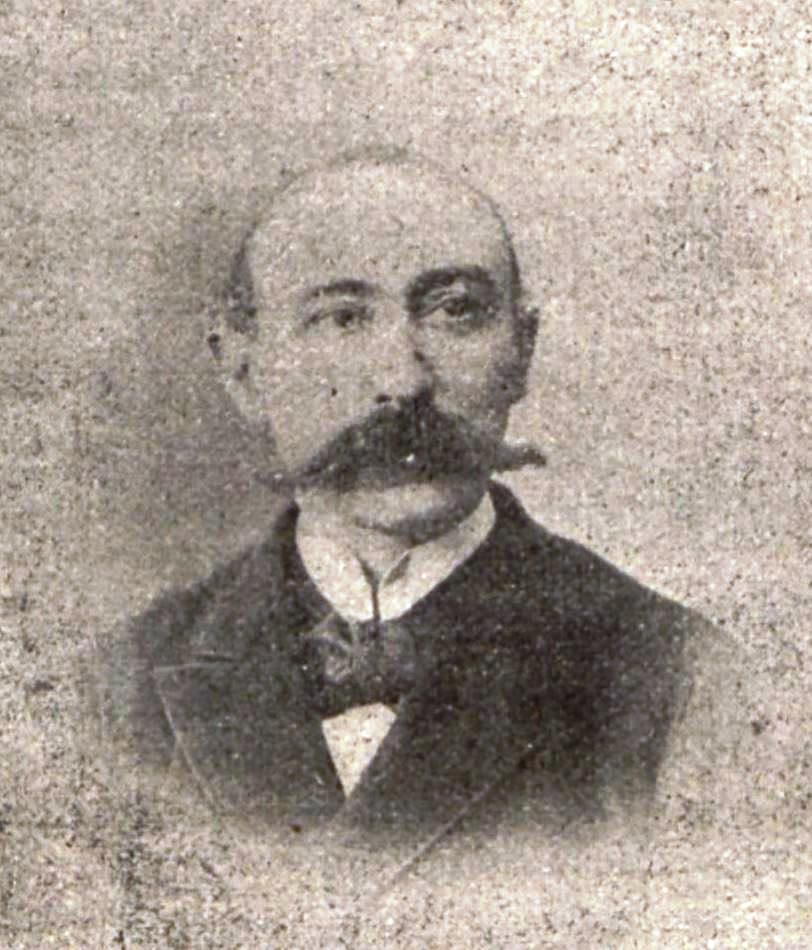
- Born: Frédéric Édouard Plessis; February 3, 1851; Brest, France
- Died: January 29, 1942 (aged 90); Paris, France

Frédéric-Édouard Plessis (February 3, 1851 – January 29, 1942) was a French poet, novelist, journalist and classical philologist.

== Biography ==
=== Family ===
The Plessis family originates from Côtes d'Armor. His father, Édouard-Henri-Joseph Plessis, a naval surgeon, was born in Saint-Brieuc. His mother Marie-Louise Brunot was born in Guingamp. They married in Guingamp in November 1846.

Marie-Louise Plessis, née Brunot, was the daughter of a subprefect of Guingamp. Well-educated, she had a great literary influence on her son Frédéric.

=== Childhood ===
Plessis was born in Brest, on February 3, 1851. He lived in Brest until he was thirteen years old. A brilliant and serious student, he had good grades, particularly in Latin. In 1864, the Plessis family moved from Brest to Paris. Plessis was educated at the Lycée Louis-le-Grand, receiving his baccalaureate two years later.

=== Education ===
After his baccalaureate, Plessis began studies in medicine, as his father did, at the University of Paris. After one year, he decided that he did not want to pursue this path. He then applied to the department of law at the University of Rennes. But the study of law did not satisfy him either, so he decided to study the humanities.

In 1878, he received a Bachelor of Arts from the University of Clermont-Ferrand, where he formed friendships with Emmanuel des Essarts and Pierre de Nolhac. He took the courses of Eugène Benoist and linguist Michel Bréal. In 1884, he defended his dissertation for a degree of Doctor of the Arts, entitled Études critiques sur Properce et ses élégies. Included in this dissertation were six photographs of the Codex Neapolitanus of Propertius which he took while he was in Wolfenbüttel, Germany.

=== University career ===
In 1880, Plessis began his career in higher education. He taught Latin and Latin literature in different French universities: Poitiers, from 1880 to 1884; Caen, from 1884 to 1887; Bordeaux, from 1887 to 1891; and Lyon, from 1891 to 1892. He was named docent at the École normale supérieure, where he taught courses from 1894 to 1907. In 1905, he obtained the position of chair of Latin poetry at Sorbonne University, which he occupied until his retirement, in 1922. He produced a number of translations and Latin works (Terence, Propertius, Cicero, Virgil, Horace), dealing mainly in Latin poetry.

=== Death ===
He died in his house in Paris. He is buried in the Vaugirard Cemetery.

=== Personal life ===
Plessis married Berthe Le Carpentier in Caen in 1883. They had five children.

== Publications ==
Note: the listed date is the date of first publication

=== Poetry ===
- 1886: La Lampe d'argile, poésies, 1873–1886, Alphonse Lemerre
- 1897: Vesper, poésies (1886–1896), Alphonse Lemerre
- 1904: Poésies complètes : 1873–1903, containing: La Lampe d'Argile, Vesper and Gallica, Alphonse Lemerre
- 1921: La Couronne de lierre, poésies, 1904–1920, Jouve
- 1937: La Couronne de lierre, poésies, 1904–1934. New edition, reviewed and changed

=== Scholarly works ===
- 1884: Térence, Les Adelphes ou P. Terenti. Afri Adelphoe, Latin text, published, with an explanatory commentary and criticism, by Frédéric Plessis, C. Klincksieck
- 1884: Études critiques sur Properce et ses élégies (French dissertation), Hachette
- 1885: Italici Ilias Latina. Edidit, praefatus est, apparatu critico et indice locuplete instruxit Fridericus Plessis (Latin dissertation – scholarly edition in Latin), Hachette
- 1885: Un chapitre de métrique latine : le pentamètre dactylique, Extract from the Bulletin mensuel de la Faculté des lettres de Caen, published by F. Le Blanc-Hardel
- 1885: Essai sur Calvus, published by F. Le Blanc-Hardel
- 1886: Propertiana, E. Leroux. Extract from the Bulletin de la Société des lettres de Poitiers, published in 1885
- 1886: Histoire abrégée de la littérature romaine, by Hermann Bender, translated from German by Jules Vessereau, with an introduction and notes by Frédéric Plessis, C. Klincksieck
- 1889: Traité de métrique grecque et latine, C. Klincksieck
- 1896: C. Licini Calvi reliquiae. Calvus, complete edition of fragments and manuscripts, biographical and literary work, by Frédéric Plessis, with an essay on Cicero's polemic and of the Attics, by J. Poirot, C. Klincksieck
- 1903: Troica Roma, Extract from the Mélanges Boissier, Albert Fontemoing
- 1903: Œuvres d'Horace, published with an philological and literary introduction and notes (in collaboration with Paul Lejay), Hachette
- 1905: Poésie latine. Épitaphes: selected texts and commentaries; with the textes choisis et commentaires; with the participation of Edmond Eggli, Henri Focillon, Maurice Gautreau, Stéphane Jolly, Henri L. de Péréra, Al. Riemann, Albert Fontemoing
- 1909: La Poésie latine. De Livius Andronicus à Rutilius Namatianus, C. Klincksieck
- 1913: Virgile. Les Bucoliques, Latin text, published with a biographic and literary study, a note on the meter, critical notes, an index of a texte latin, publiées avec une étude biographique et littéraire, une notice sur la métrique, des notes critiques, un index des proper nouns, et explanatory notes (scholarly edition, with commentary), Hachette
- 1919: Horace (scholarly edition, with commentary), Hachette
- 1924: Satires. Odes et épodes; Chant séculaire (published by Paul Lejay and Édouard Galletier), Hachette
- 1924: Q. Horati Flacci Carmina. Odes, Épodes et Chant séculaire, published by Lahure

=== Novels ===
- 1873 ?: Madame de Jonquière, in La Patrie
- 1875: Les Étrennes malencontreuses, published in the review Le Siècle littéraire
- 1896 et 1897: Angèle de Blindes, in La Revue des deux mondes, afterwards by Alphonse Lemerre
- 1897: Indépendante. Les souvenirs de Valentine
- 1897: Le Mariage de Léonie, published in La Revue pour les jeunes filles, afterwards by Alphonse Lemerre
- 1897: Le Psychologue (novella)
- 1902: Le Chemin montant, in Minerva, afterwards with Fontemoing
- 1911: Saint-Exupère-les-Châsses, at first in Le Mois, afterwards by Maison de la Bonne Presse, published in the form of a serial in the daily newspaper L'Action française from 11 May 1933 to 20 July 1933
- 1923: Caroline Gévrot, first in La Revue universelle, afterwards by Perrin
- 1928: La Petite Fanny (with Rose et Rosine), unfinished manuscript of a novel (Note: Plessis began to write this novel in 1928, but it remained unfinished – wherefore this gap between the publication Rose et Rosine and the writing of La Petite Fanny. Rose et Rosine was without a doubt written at the beginning of the 1920s.)
- 1930: Le Clos Varin, first in La Revue universelle, afterwards by Éditions de la Vraie France
- 1933: Muse de Follepensée, published in the Revue universelle
- 1938: Rose et Rosine, published in L'Action française
- Date unknown: Une attaque de diligence (1857) – unedited
- Date unknown: Marie – unedited
- Date unknown: Édith Sarmaise – unedited
- Date unknown: Madame Darnac – unedited
- Date unknown: Arrivisme ou Une jeune tante – unedited
- Date unknown: Pions et Pharisiens – unedited
