= Louis Perrin (printer) =

French printer and engraver

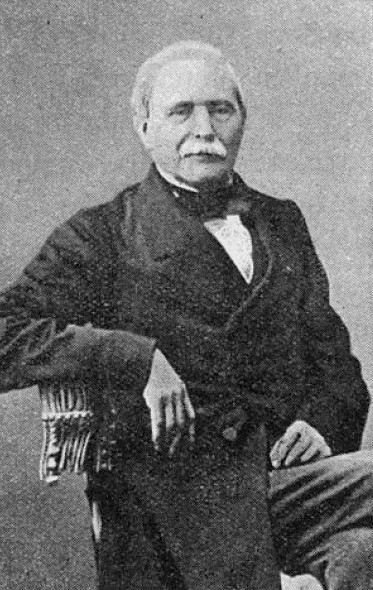
Photographie of Louis Perrin (1799–1865)

Louis-Benoît Perrin (French pronunciation: [lwi pɛʁɛ̃]; 12 May 1799 – 7 April 1865) was a French printer and type designer based in Lyon.

== Biography ==
Perrin was born in Lyon, the son of Jean Baptiste Robert Perrin and brother of Adélaïde Perrin, the founder of a hospital for young girls, and Théodore Perrin, a doctor.

Perrin cut a new type he called caractères augustaux in 1846, modeled on sketches of Roman capital letters from inscriptions in collections of and around Lyon, an ancient Roman foundation called Lugdunum. These revived types were in part a reaction against the Didot typeface style. The typefounder was P. F. C. Rey and the cutter was J. M. Fugère. The lowercase letters were based on 16th century models by Jean de Tournes and the English type Caslon. The italic is derived from Grandjean and Fournier.

After Perrin debuted his new types, they were soon copied in Paris and elsewhere in France. They were known as Elzévir and became popularised by the French printer Alphonse Lemerre and in London by the publisher Thomas Fisher Unwin for his 1890s editions of John Oliver Hobbes.
