= Popelín =

- Municipality
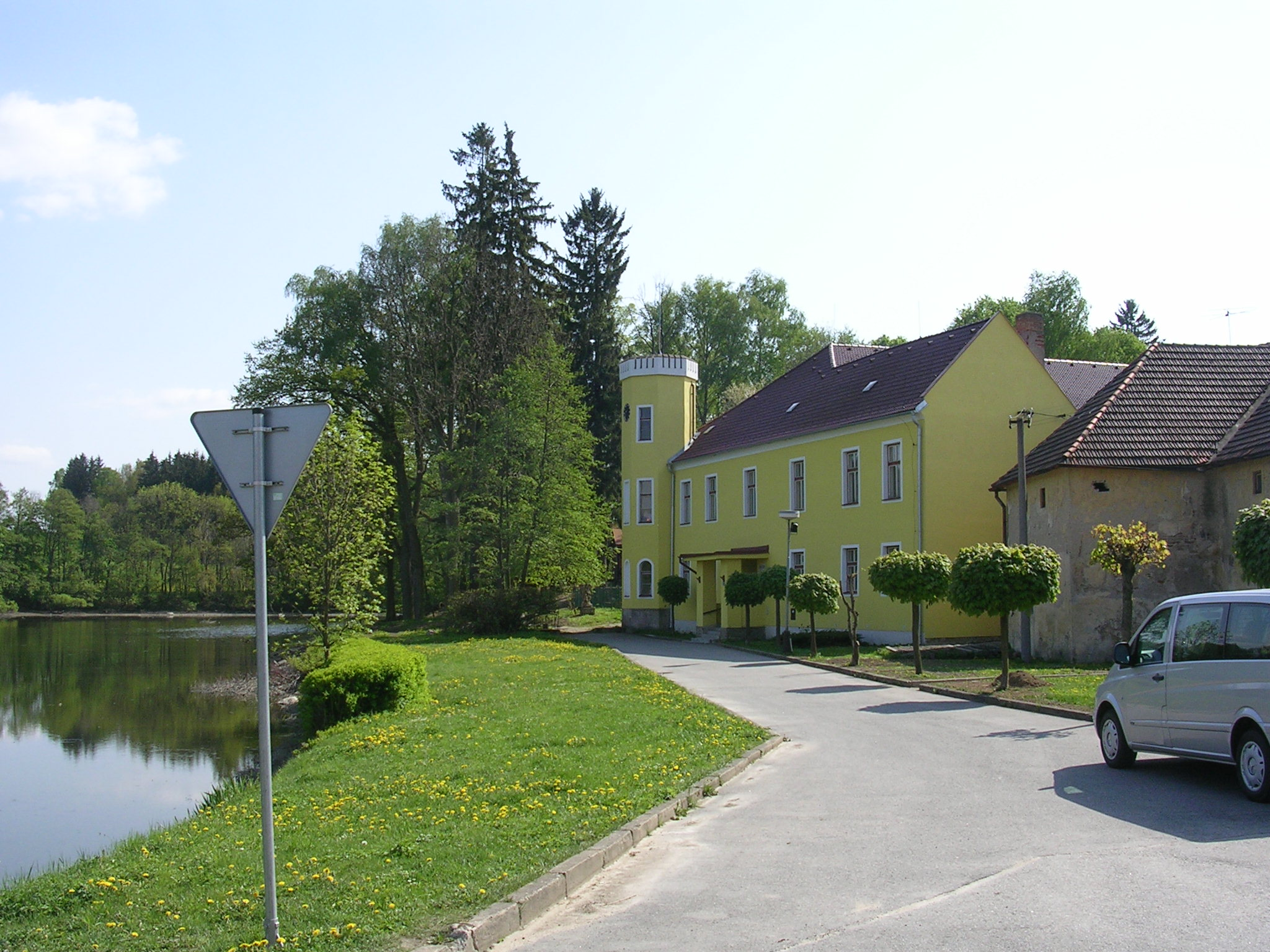
- Popelín Castle, today a primary school

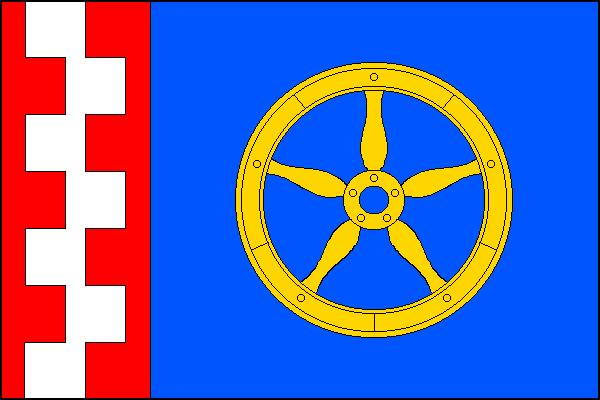
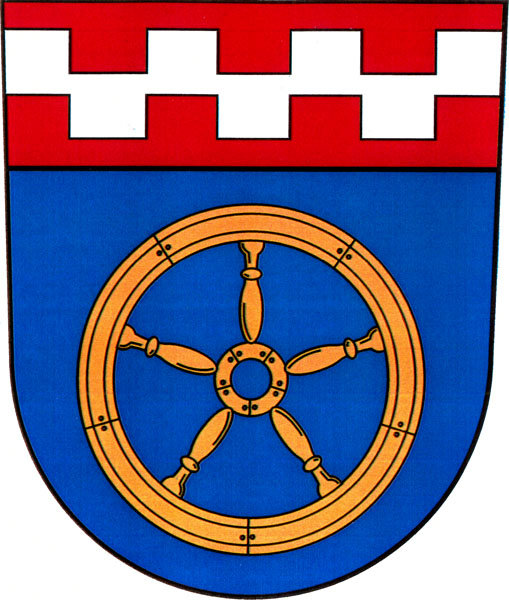
- Flag Coat of arms

- Location in the Czech Republic
- Coordinates: 49°12′49″N 15°11′2″E
- Country: Czech Republic
- Region: South Bohemian
- District: Jindřichův Hradec
- First mentioned: 1349

Area
  - Total: 13.47 km^{2} (5.20 sq mi)
- Elevation: 575 m (1,886 ft)

Population (2026-01-01)
  - Total: 479
  - Density: 35.6/km^{2} (92.1/sq mi)
- Time zone: UTC+1 (CET)
  - Summer (DST): UTC+2 (CEST)
- Postal codes: 378 53, 378 55
- Website: www.popelin.cz

Popelín is a municipality and village in Jindřichův Hradec District in the South Bohemian Region of the Czech Republic. It has about 500 inhabitants.

Popelín lies approximately 16 kilometres (10 mi) north-east of Jindřichův Hradec, 59 km (37 mi) north-east of České Budějovice, and 112 km (70 mi) south-east of Prague.

== Administrative division ==
Popelín consists of two municipal parts (in brackets population according to the 2021 census):

- Popelín (388)
- Horní Olešná (80)

== Demographics ==
Historical population
Year	Pop.	±%
1869	1,008	—
1880	994	−1.4%
1890	1,017	+2.3%
1900	1,062	+4.4%
1910	1,106	+4.1%
1921	1,160	+4.9%
1930	1,112	−4.1%
1950	776	−30.2%
1961	781	+0.6%
1970	633	−19.0%
1980	527	−16.7%
1991	493	−6.5%
2001	442	−10.3%
2011	474	+7.2%
2021	468	−1.3%
Source: Censuses
