= Louis Petit de Julleville =

French historian (1841–1900)

Louis Petit de Julleville (18 July 1841 – 28 August 1900) was a French scholar.

== Life ==
Born in Paris, Petit de Julleville was educated at the École Normale Supérieure and the French School at Athens. He received his doctorate in literature in 1868. After holding various posts as a teacher, he became a professor of French medieval literature and of the history of the French language at the University of Paris in 1886.

== Works ==
His most important works are:

- Histoire du théâtre en France, including Les Mystères (2 vols, 1880)
- Les Comédiens en France au Moyen âge (1885)
- La Comédie et les mœurs en France au Moyen âge (1886)
- Répertoire du théâtre comique en France au Moyen âge (1886)
- Le Théâtre en France, histoire de la littérature dramatique depuis ses origines jusqu'à nos jours (1889)

Petit de Julleville was also the general editor of the Histoire de la langue et de la littérature française (8 vols, 1896-1900), to which he also contributed some valuable chapters himself.
