= Auguste Poulet-Malassis =

French printer and publisher (1825–1878)

Paul Emmanuel Auguste Poulet-Malassis
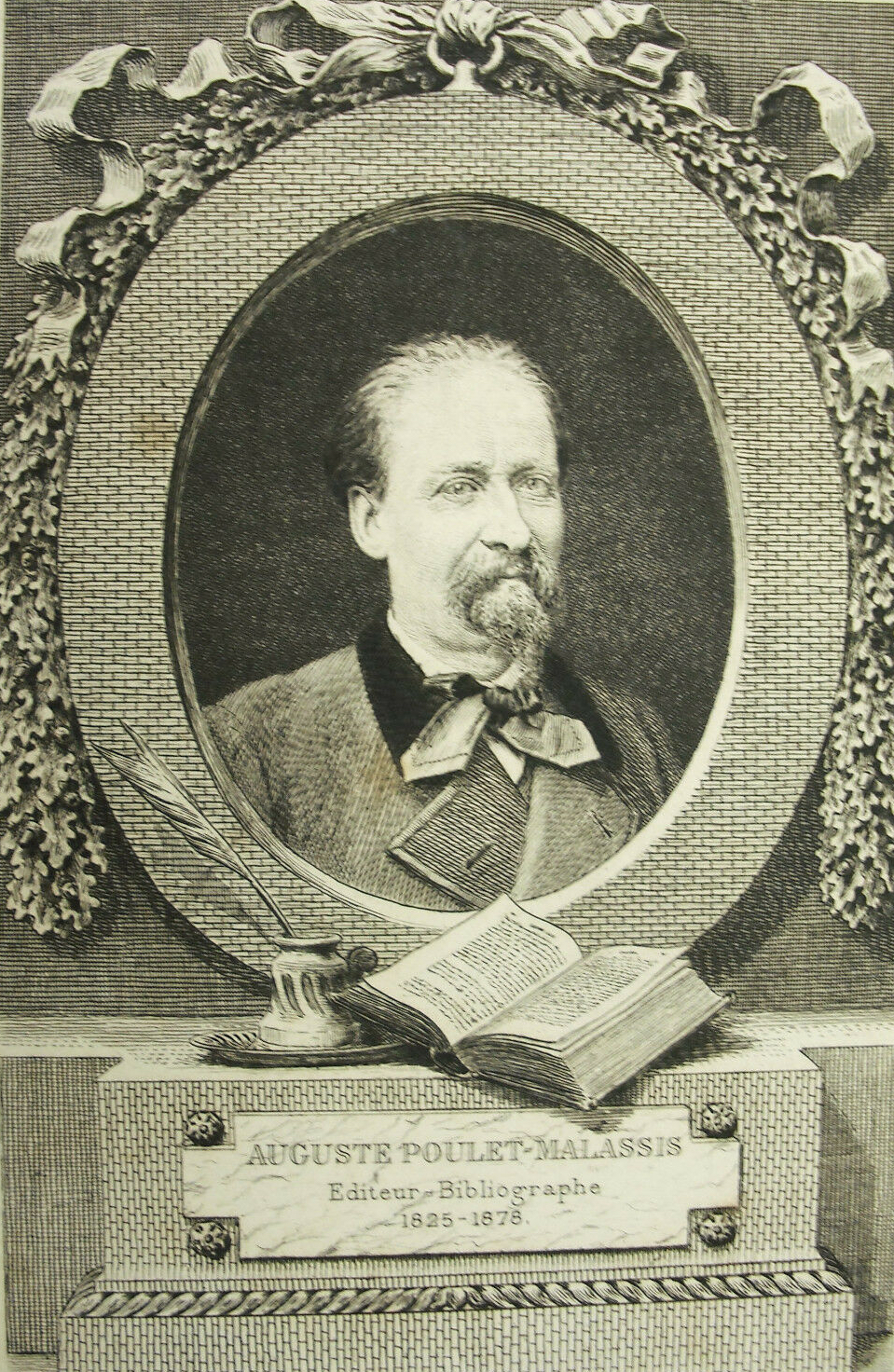
- Paul Emmanuel Auguste Poulet-Malassis
- Born: 16 March 1825; Alençon, France
- Died: 11 February 1878 (aged 52); Paris, France
- Occupations: Printer, publisher
- Writing career
- Period: 1844–1875
- Literary movement: Symbolist, Modernist

Paul Emmanuel Auguste Poulet-Malassis (16 March 1825 – 11 February 1878) was a French printer and publisher who lived and worked in Paris. He was a longstanding friend and the printer-publisher of Charles Baudelaire.

== Biography ==
During 6 years of printing and publishing career, Poulet-Malassis released few books, and with little gain financially. He seemed to have been more concerned with their aesthetics and their appeal to his close friends than, much to the despair of his partner and brother-in-law Eugène de Broise, the profits and financial state of his business. The books were always beautifully bound and printed on fine paper with illustrations.

Poulet-Malassis famously printed and published the works of Baudelaire, but also printed works that would have been safer, by more acclaimed novelists, poets and critics. These included Théodore Faullain de Banville, Théophile Gautier, Charles Augustin Sainte-Beuve and Champfleury.

It sometimes seems as if he had printed his friends' works - through acts of kindheartedness or even sympathy - when they had nowhere else to turn. This may have been the case with Baudelaire, who struggled to make a living almost all of his adult life.

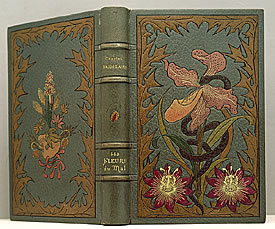
First edition of Les Fleurs du mal by Charles Baudelaire (Paris: Poulet-Malassis et de Broise, 1857). Inscribed to Nadar (Félix Tournachon), pioneer photographer, writer, and caricaturist, and one of Baudelaire's very small inner circle of friends. Binding by Charles Meunier.

He and Baudelaire worked themselves further and further into debt until Poulet-Malassis was imprisoned for unpaid debts in November 1862. This debt would have been less of a problem, if it were not for the scarcity of sales, probably due to little or no advertising. It could not have helped being involved with the scandal and outrage which Les Fleurs du mal generated.

In 1868, he was sentenced to one year in jail in absentia, alongside a fine of 500 francs, after Baudelaire's Les Epaves was banned, which he published in the same year. This occurred only a year after his initial publications of Baudelaire's Les Fleurs du mal and Le Spleen de Paris.
