= Alfred Des Essarts =

- Born: Alfred Stanislas Langlois des Essarts; 9 August 1811; Passy, Paris, France
- Died: 18 May 1893 (aged 81); Clermont-Ferrand, France
- Occupations: Poet; Translator; Plawright; Writer

Alfred des Essarts (9 August 1811 – 18 May 1893) was a 19th-century French poet, translator, playwright and writer, the father of Emmanuel des Essarts.

== Biography ==
A curator at the Bibliothèque Sainte-Geneviève in Paris, a journalist at La France littéraire and L'Écho français, he was also author of feuilletons, novels, songs and poems. His plays were staged at the Théâtre-Français and at the Théâtre du Vaudeville.

He also translated from Russian for Éditions Franck the memoirs of Princess Dashkova, and from English for Hachette, several works by Charles Dickens such as The Life and Adventures of Martin Chuzzlewit and The Old Curiosity Shop.

== Works ==
- 1830: Le Donjon de Vincennes, Les Marchands de nouveautés
- 1837: 1812. Le Prisonnier de guerre en Russie, Poussielgue
- 1841: Influence de la civilisation chrétienne en Orient, poetry, Maulde et Renou
- 1841: Une Perle dans la mer, novel, 2 vols, Lachapelle
- 1842: Le Lord bohémien, 2 vols, Ch. Lachapelle
- 1843: Le Monument de Molière, poetry, Lange-Lévy et Cie
- 1843: Le Pénitent, legend, Lange-Lévy
- 1844: Le Chant de la syrène, melody, music by Oscar Comettant
- 1845: Sous les ombrages, simples tales, Librairie Louis Janet
- 1846: Adhémar, feuilleton in La Patrie
- 1846: Les Chants de la jeunesse, followed by Livre des pleurs, poems, Librairie Louis Janet
- 1846: Jeanne d'Arc, scène et air, music by Comettant
- 1846: Une Mésalliance, feuilleton
- 1846: La Plainte d'Ariane, dramatic melody for soprano, music by Comettant
- 1847: Andréas et Béatrice, histoire vénitienne, feuilleton in La Sylphide
- 1847: L'Univers illustré, géographie vivante, Librairie Louis Janet
- 1848: La Pervenche, livre des salons, with Marie Aycard and Émile Deschamps, Librairie Louis Janet
- 1849: Frère et sœur, Arpin
- 1849: Un Héros de roman, feuilleton
- 1849: Le Trésor de l'émigré, feuilleton
- 1849: La Ligue des amants, one-act comedy, in verse, 1849
- 1850: Julie de Fenestranges, feuilleton
- 1850: Marcello, feuilleton
- 1851: La Comédie du monde, Comptoir des imprimeurs-unis
- 1851: Une Invasion de cosaques, feuilleton, de Vigny
- 1852: Annunziata, De Vigny
- 1852: Sélim, feuilleton
- 1853: La Gerbe, by Soye and Bouchet
- 1853: La Noix dorée, one-act comédie en vaudevilles, with Lucien Duval,
- 1854: Récits historiques, Le Clère
- 1855: Portraits biographiques et critiques des hommes de la guerre d'Orient, Garnier frères
- 1855: Les Cœurs dévoués, Jourdan
- 1855: Légendes célestes, Le Clère : Reichel et Cie
- 1855: Sous la neige, chacun son récit, with Philibert Audebrand, Jules Rostaing, Maurice Alhoy and Louise Leneveux, Librairie Louis Janet
- 1856: Les Restes de saint Augustin rapportés à Hippone, poem, by Soye et Bouchet
- 1856: La Femme de l'espion, feuilleton
- 1857: La Petite Poucette, true story, Librairie Louis Janet
- 1857: Dix peintres célèbres, Le Clère
- 1858: Les Masques d'or, roman de mœurs contemporaines, Leleux
- 1858: Le Tour du cadran, simples récits, Vermot
- 1858: François de Médicis, historical novel, Hachette
- 1858: Neuf peintres célèbres, 2nd series, Le Clère
- 1859: Lectures d'hiver, Le Clère
- 1859: La Poursuite de l'Idéal, comédie fantastique
- 1860: Le Marché aux consciences, Lécrivain and Toubon
- 1861: La Guerre des frères, Poulet-Malassis
- 1861: Une Petite-fille de Robinson, Librairie Louis Janet
- 1862: Contes pompadours, Dentu
- 1862: Les Célébrités françaises, Vermot
- 1862: Les Deux veuves, Maillet
- 1862: Les Grands peintres, Vermot
- 1862: Les Fêtes de nos pères, Dupray de La Mahérie
- 1863: Valentin, ou la Femme du mousse, Librairie Louis Janet
- 1863: Le Père la Morale, veillées de village, Martinet
- 1863: Souffrir c'est vaincre, Dupray de La Mahérie
- 1864: Guignol, livre de la jeunesse, Dupray de La Mahérie
- 1864: Les Grands inventeurs anciens et modernes, Magnin, Blanchard et Cie
- 1865: Le Champ de roses, récit de village, E. Maillet
- 1866: Marthe, E. Maillet
- 1867: Le Roman des mères, feuilleton in Le Figaro
- 1868: Chanson d'une mère !, berceuse, music by Joseph O'Kelly
- 1868: Le Marquis de Roquefeuille, Maillet
- 1869: La Richesse des pauvres, followed by Mau-Jaunens, légende limousine, Bray
- 1869: Le Champ de roses, village story, Dillet
- 1870: L'Enfant volé, 2 vol, Vaton frères
- 1870: La Force des faibles, Dillet
- 1870: Les Masques d'or, Novel of contemporary mores, Lachaud
- 1877: Le Meneur de loups, village story, Lecoffre fils
- 1879: Le Roman d'un vieux garçon, Olmer
- 1879: Triste sommeil, triste réveil, music by Jean-Baptiste Weckerlin, Durand, Schoenewerk & Cie
- 1880: Récits légendaires, Mame
- 1882: Pulcinella, reflet d'Italie, Grand-Montrouge: Librairie d'éducation
- 1882: De l'Aube à la nuit, Pétrot-Garnier
- 1882: La Grâce d'un père, Grand-Montrouge: Librairie d'éducation
- 1884: La Muse du Sonnet, sonnets, with Clovis Hugues and Achille Millien
- 1892: L'Ame du violon, Hatier
- 1892: Le Soir, birds' songs, with Charles Lopis, music by Aloÿs Claussmann

== Bibliography ==
- Gustave Vapereau, Dictionnaire universel des contemporains, 1893, (p. 457)
- Henri Mondor, Lloyd James Austin, Correspondance : 1862-1871 de Stéphane Mallarmé, Gallimard, 1959, (p. 307)
