= Robert de Bonnières =

French poet and writer (1850–1905)

Robert de Wierre de Bonnières (7 April 1850, in Paris – 7 April 1905) was a French poet, composer, novelist, travel writer, journalist at Le Figaro and Le Gaulois, and literary critic. He was well acquainted with all literary figures of the period - Guy de Maupassant dedicated his novela La Folle to Bonnières in 1882. He collaborated with several composers, notably Vincent d'Indy who set several of his poems and provided the libretto for Indy's opéra comique Attendez-moi de, based on his own story Saugefleurie of 1885.
