= Emmanuel des Essarts =

French poet and man of letters

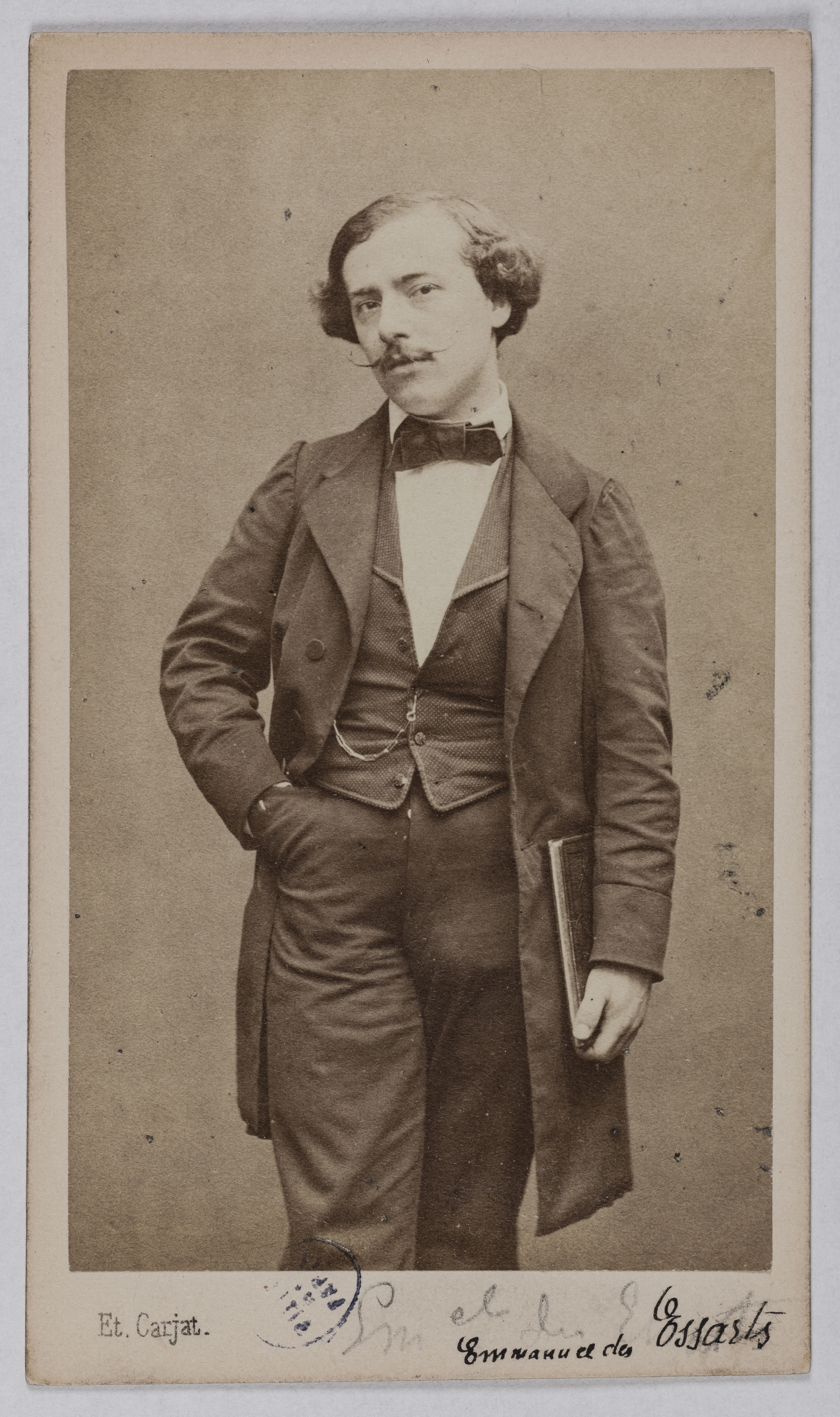
Image of Emmanuel Des Essarts,

Emmanuel-Adolphe Langlois des Essarts (5 February 1839 in Paris – 17 October 1909 in Clermont-Ferrand) was a French poet and man of letters.

== Early life ==
Emmanuel des Essarts was born on 5 February 1839 in Paris, France. His father, Alfred Stanislas Langlois Des Essarts (died 1893), was a poet and novelist of considerable reputation. The son was educated at the École Normale Supérieure.

== Career ==
He became a teacher of rhetoric and finally professor of literature at Dijon and at Clermont.

He wrote Poésies parisiennes (1862), a volume of light verse on trifling subjects; Les Élévations (1864), philosophical poems; Origines de la poésie lyrique en France au XVI^{e} siècle (1873); Du génie de Chateaubriand (1876); Poèmes de la Révolution (1879); Pallas Athéné (1887); Portraits de maîtres (1888), etc., and he was a contributor to Le Parnasse contemporain.
