= Léon Dierx =

French poet (1838–1912)

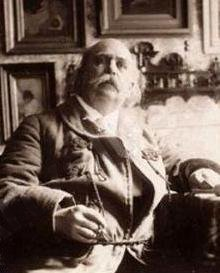
Léon Dierx

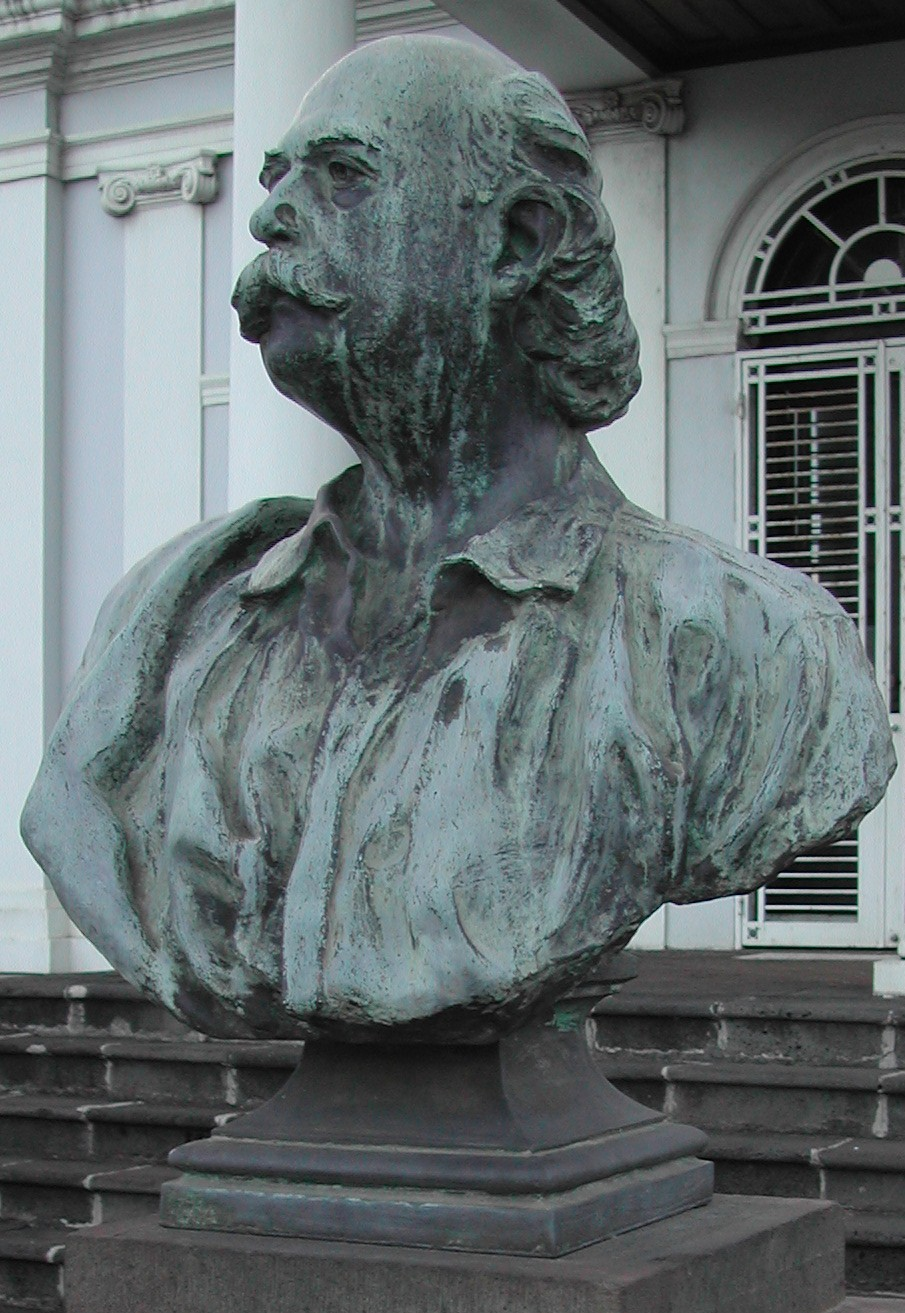
Statue representing Léon Dierx in Saint-Denis, Réunion.

Léon Dierx (French: [leɔ̃ djɛʁks]; March 31, 1838 – June 11, 1912) was a French poet born in Saint-Denis in 1838. He came to Paris to study at the Central School of Arts and Manufactures and subsequently settled there, taking up a post in the education office. He became a disciple of Leconte de Lisle and one of the most distinguished of the Parnassians.

His works include: Aspirations (1858); Poèmes et poésies (1864); Lèvres closes (1867); Paroles d'un vaincu (1871) ; La Rencontre, a dramatic scene (1875) and Les Amants (1879). His Poésies complètes (1872) were crowned by the French Academy. A complete edition of his works was published in 2 volumes, 1894–1896.

He was made Chevalier of the Legion of Honour in 1901.
