= Leconte de Lisle =

French poet (1818–1894)

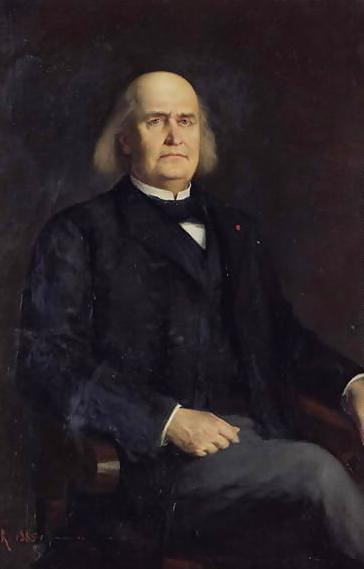
- Born: Charles Marie René Leconte de Lisle; 22 October 1818; Saint-Paul, Réunion, France
- Died: 17 July 1894 (aged 75); Voisins (near Louveciennes), France
- Occupations: Poet, writer, translator
- Writing career
- Period: 1846–1894
- Notable works: Poèmes antiques, Poèmes barbares, Poèmes tragiques, A People's history of the French Revolution (Histoire populaire de la révolution française), A People's History of Christianity (Histoire populaire de la christianisme)
- Movement: Parnassian poets

Charles Marie René Leconte de Lisle (French: [ʃaʁl maʁi ʁəne ləkɔ̃t də lil]; 22 October 1818 – 17 July 1894) was a French poet of the Parnassian movement. He is traditionally known by his surname only, Leconte de Lisle.

== Biography ==
Leconte de Lisle was born on the French overseas island of La Réunion, in the Indian Ocean. He spent his childhood there and later in Brittany. Among his friends in those years was the musician Charles Bénézit. His father, an army surgeon who brought Leconte up with great severity, sent him to travel in the East Indies intending to prepare him for a business career. However, after returning from this journey, the young man preferred to complete his education in Rennes, Brittany, specializing in Greek, Italian and history. In 1845 he settled definitively in Paris.

He was involved in the French Revolution of 1848 which ended with the overthrow of the Orleans King Louis Philippe of France, but took no further part in politics after the Second Republic was declared.

His first volume, La Vénus de Milo, attracted to him a number of friends many of whom were passionately devoted to classical literature. However, as a writer he is most famous for his three collections of poetry: Poèmes antiques (1852), Poèmes barbares (1862), Poèmes tragiques (1884). He is also known for his translations of Ancient Greek tragedians and poets, such as Aeschylus, Sophocles, Euripides and Horace. (Note: Homère, les tragiques grecs (Eschyle, Sophocle, Euripide), Hésiode, Théocrite, Biôn, Moskhos, Tyrtée, Horace, etc.)

Leconte de Lisle played a leading role in the Parnassian poetic movement (1866) and shared many of the values of other poets of this generation, bridging the Romantic and Symbolist periods.

Although Leconte de Lisle was a fervent Republican, during the reign of Napoleon III he accepted the pensions and decorations offered to him by the Emperor. This was held against him after the fall of the Second Empire and its replacement by the Third Republic, in 1871.

However, Leconte de Lisle redeemed himself with the new government by writing two democratically-oriented books entitled A People's History of the French Revolution and A People's History of Christianity, respectively. These works earned him a post as Assistant Librarian at the Luxembourg Palace in 1873; in 1886 he was elected to the French Academy, in succession to Victor Hugo.

== Personal life ==
Leconte de Lisle married Anna Adélaïde Perray (29 March 1833 – 8 September 1916), daughter of Jacques Perray and Amélie Leconte, in Paris on 10 September 1857. The couple had no children.

Leconte de Lisle died on 17 July 1894 at Voisins in the township of Louveciennes, to the west of Paris.

== Works ==
As well as poetry, Leconte de Lisle produced a number of theatrical plays, lyrical works, translations, and historical works. His works are shown below, in chronological order.

	Type	Title	year	Comments, editions, etc.
1	Poetry	Poèmes antiques	1852	[1] Marc Ducloux, 1852. Rééditions : Lemerre, [2] 1874, [3] 1881, [4] 1886. Ed. de référence : [5] 1891.
2	Poetry	Poèmes et Poésies	1855	[1] Dentu, 1855. Réédition : [2] Taride, 1857.
3	Poetry	Le Chemin de la Croix ou La Passion	1856	[1] Chez les Auteurs, 1856. Rééditions [2] 1857, [3] 1858.
4	Poetry	Poésies Complètes : Poèmes antiques - Poèmes et Poésies - Poésies nouvelles	1858	[1] with decoration by Louis Duveau, Poulet-Malassis et Eugène de Broise, 1858.
5	Poetry	Poèmes barbares	1862	[1] (sous le titre Poésies Barbares), Poulet-Malassis, 1862. Rééditions : Lemerre (sous le titre définitif Poèmes barbares, et incorporant Le Soir d'une Bataille, 1871) : [2] 1872, [3] 1878, [4] 1881 ou 1882, [5] Ed. de référence, 1889.
6	Poetry	Le Soir d'une Bataille	1871	[1] Lemerre, 1871.
7	Poetry	Le Sacre de Paris	1871	[1] Lemerre, 1871.
8	Poetry	Poèmes tragiques	1884	[1] Lemerre, 1884. Ce recueil incorpore : Le Sacre de Paris, 1871; Les Érinnyes, 1873. Rééditions : [2] 1886. Ed. de référence : [3] 1895.
9	Poetry	Derniers poèmes	1895	Published by José-Maria de Heredia and Vicomte de Guerne. This collection includes: L'Apollonide; La Passion; les préfaces des Poèmes antiques, 1852 et de Poèmes et Poésies, 1855; Les Poètes contemporains, 1864 et Charles Baudelaire, 1861. [1] Lemerre, 1895. Réédition : [2] 1899, and, Soleils ! Poussière d'or.
10	Poetry	Premières Poésies et lettres intimes	1902	Posthumous publication: [1] Éditions Fasquelle|Fasquelle, 1902.
11	Poetry	Les États du Diable	1895	Posthumous publication: only a fragment remains of this work, published in Derniers poèmes, 1895, with the title Cozza et Borgia.
12	Theatre	Hélène	1852	Leconte de Lisle included Hélène in Poèmes antiques from the first edition in 1852. Ernest Chausson extracted a lyrical theme from it in (1885)
13	Theatre	Les Érinnyes	1873	Tragedia antica, M. Massenet; Première partie - Klytaimnestra; - Orestès. [1] Alphonse Lemerre, 1873. Rééditions : [2] 1876, [3] 1889..
14	Theatre	L’Apollonide	1888	Lyrical drama. Music from Franz Servais. [1] Lemerre.
15	Theatre	Frédégonde	1895	Pièce de Theatre mentionnée par Fernand Calmettes
16	Translation	Théocrite, Idylles et Epigrammes; Odes anacréontiques	1861	New translation by Leconte de Lisle, Poulet-Malassis et Eugène de Broise,
17	Translation	Homère, Iliade	1866	Lemerre, 1866. Rééditions : [2] - 1874, [3] - 1882, [4] - 1884.
18	Translation	Homère, Odyssée	1868	Lemerre,
19	Translation	Hésiode, Hymnes orphiques, Théocrite, Biôn, Moskhos, Tyrtée, Odes anacréontiques	1869	Lemerre translation of Théocrite 1861.
20	Translation	Eschyle	1872	Lemerre
21	Translation	Horace, Œuvres	1873	Lemerre
22	Translation	Sophocle	1877	Lemerre
23	Translation	Euripide	1884	Lemerre
24	Manifeste	Preface of Poèmes antiques	1852	Marc Ducloux; Derniers poèmes, 1895
25	Manifeste	Preface of Poèmes et Poésies	1855	Dentu; Derniers poèmes, 1895.
26	Manifeste	Preface of Idylles de Théocrite et Odes anacréontiques	1861	Poulet-Malassis et Eugène de Broise; Subject: translation
27	Manifeste	Foreword of the study about the Poètes contemporains	1864	Le Nain Jaune
28	Manifeste	Avertissement de la Translation de l’Iliade d’Homère.	1867	Lemerre; Theme : translation.
29	Récit en prose	Mon premier amour en prose	1840	Published in La Variété, December 1840.
30	Récit en prose	Une Peau de Tigre	1841	Published in La Variété, March 1841.
31	Récit en prose	Le Songe d’Hermann	1846	Published in La Démocratie pacifique.
32	Récit en prose	La Mélodie incarnée	1846	Published in La Démocratie pacifique.
33	Récit en prose	Le Prince Ménalcas,	1846	Published in La Démocratie pacifique.
34	Récit en prose	Sacatove,	1846	Published in La Démocratie pacifique.
35	Récit en prose	Dianora	1847	Published in La Démocratie pacifique.
36	Récit en prose	Marcie	1847	Published in La Démocratie pacifique.
37	Récit en prose	La Rivière des Songes	1847	Published in La Démocratie pacifique.
38	Récit en prose	La Princesse Yaso’da	1847	Published in La Démocratie pacifique.
39	Récit en prose	Phalya-Mani	1876	Published in La République des Lettres.
40	Historical book	Histoires des guerres sociales		Unpublished
41	Historical book	L'Inde française	1858	Published in Le Présent, t., 1858. Work updated by Edgard Pich; Rééditions : [2] tome des Œuvres de l'édition E. Pich, 388; [3] Grand Océan, coll. Les Introuvables de l'Océan Indien, 1999.
42	Historical book	Catéchisme populaire républicain	1870; 2013	Lemerre. Éditions Alliage.
43	Historical book	A People's History of Christianity (Histoire Populaire du Christianisme)	1871, 2013	Édition Lemerre. Editions Alliage
44	Historical book	A People's History of the French Revolution (Histoire Populaire de la Révolution française)	1871; 2013	Édition Lemerre. Editions Alliage
45	Historical book	A People's History of the Middle Ages (Histoire Populaire du Moyen-Âge)	1876	Written in collaboration with Jean Marras and Pierre Gosset. Édition Lemerre. Appeared without mention of Jean Marras. Pierre Gosset is only mentioned on the cover of the paperback copies.
46	Notice	Charles Baudelaire, Les Fleurs du mal, édition, Paris, Poulet-Malassis	1861	Revue Européenne, décembre 1861. Cet article est intégré dans le recueil posthume Derniers poèmes, 1895, en dernière place des Poètes contemporains.
47	Notice	Les Poètes contemporains : Béranger, Lamartine, Victor Hugo, Alfred de Vigny, Auguste Barbier	1864	Publié dans Le Nain jaune : Avant-propos, 3/08/1864;- Béranger, 13/08/1864;- Lamartine, 20/08/1864;- Victor Hugo, 31/08/1864; - Alfred de Vigny, 10/09/1864;- Auguste Barbier, 01/10/1864. Les notices sont intégrées dans le recueil posthume Derniers Poèmes, 1895.
48	Notice	Notice sur Victor Hugo	1887	Paru dans l'Anthologie des Poètes français du XIXe, Lemerre, 4 vol., 1887–89. La notice se trouve dans le vol.
49	Notice	Notice sur Auguste Barbier	1887	Paru dans l'Anthologie des Poètes français du XIXe, Lemerre, 4 vol., 1887–89. La notice se trouve dans le vol.
50	Notice	Notice sur Edmond Haraucourt	1889	Paru dans l'Anthologie des Poètes français du XIXe, Lemerre, 4 vol., 1887-89. La notice se trouve dans le vol.
51	Speech	Burial speech for Victor Hugo.	1885	Speech, "In the Name of the Poets", given at the burial of Victor Hugo in the Panthéon, le 1
52	Speech	Speech given at his réception by the French Academy	1887	Reception speech at the French Academy, Thursday 31, Institut de France, 1887.
53	Préface	Léon Vanier, Rimes de mai : Les Églantines	1891	
54	Préface	Georges Bois, Monsieur le Vicaire	1891	Dentu
55	Préface	Robert de Montesquiou, Les Chauves-Souris	1893	G. Richard
56	Préface	Jean Dornis, La Voie douloureuse, roman	1894	Calmann Lévy
57	Préface	Judith Gautier, Iskender, histoire persane	1894	Paris, Armand Colin, bibliothèque de romans historiques.
58	Pétition	Soutien à la République et à l'abolition de l'esclavage	1848	
59	Pétition	Artists against the Eiffel Tower	1887	

== Bibliography ==
- J. Dornis: Leconte de Lisle intime (1895)
- F. Calmette: Un Demi siècle littéraire, Leconte de Lisle et ses amis (1902)
- Paul Bourget: Nouveaux essais de psychologie contemporaine (1885)
- Ferdinand Brunetière: L'Évolution de la poésie lyrique en France au XIX" siècle (1894)
- Maurice Spronck: Les Artistes littéraires (1889)
- Jules Lemaître: Les Contemporains (2nd series, 1886)
- F. Brunetière: Nouveaux essais sur la littérature contemporaine (1895)
- Complete poetry work of Leconte de Lisle (in French)
- This includes a lengthy critical review, focusing on Leconte de Lisle's place in the Parnassian movement.
