= Sully Prudhomme =

French poet (1839–1907)

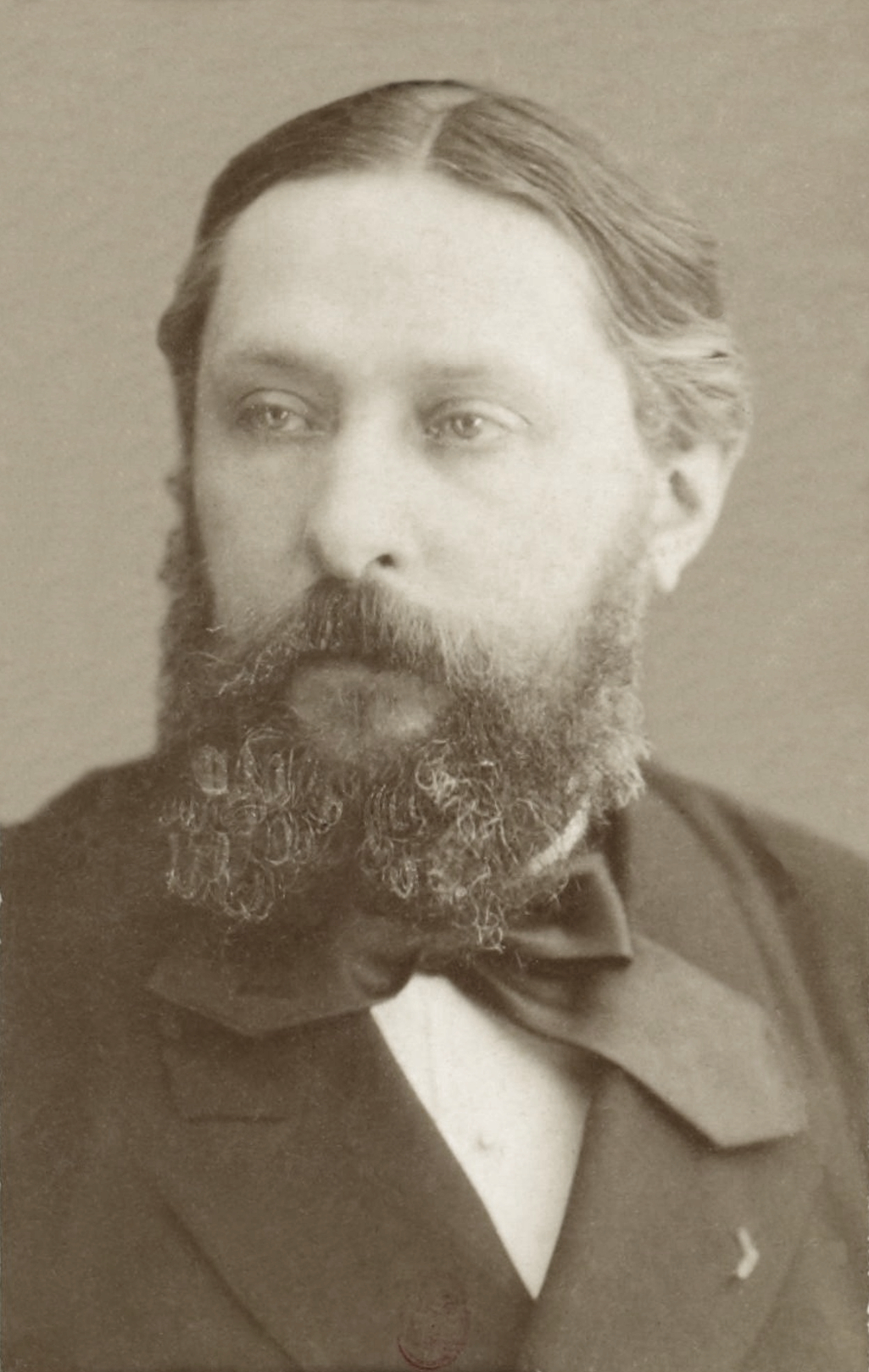
- Prudhomme in the 1880s
- Born: René François Armand Prudhomme; 16 March 1839; Paris, France
- Died: 6 September 1907 (aged 68); Châtenay-Malabry, France
- Occupation: Writer
- Writing career
- Language: French
- Genres: Poetry; essay
- Notable awards: Nobel Prize in Literature; 1901
- Movement: Parnassianism

René François Armand "Sully" Prudhomme (French: [syli pʁydɔm]; 16 March 1839 – 6 September 1907) was a French poet and essayist. He was the first winner of the Nobel Prize in Literature, in 1901.

Born in Paris, Prudhomme originally studied to be an engineer, but turned to philosophy and later to poetry; he declared it as his intention to create scientific poetry for modern times. In character sincere and melancholic, he was linked to the Parnassus school, although, at the same time, his work displays characteristics of its own.

== Early life ==
Prudhomme's parents were M. Sully Prudhomme and Clotilde Caillat. They had been engaged for 10 years before they had felt financially able to marry. When Prudhomme was two, his father, a shopkeeper, died. His mother and he relocated to Prudhomme's uncle's house. Prudhomme joined his father's name "Sully" with his surname Prudhomme, becoming Sully-Prudhomme. He was interested in classic literature and mathematics in school. He also considered entering the Dominican order, but decided against it.

Prudhomme attended the Lycée Bonaparte, but eye trouble interrupted his studies. He worked for a while in the Creusot region for the Schneider steel foundry, and then began studying law in a notary's office. The favourable reception of his early poems by the Conférence La Bruyère (a student society) encouraged him to begin a literary career.

== Writing ==
His first collection, Stances et Poèmes ("Stanzas and Poems", 1865), was praised by Sainte-Beuve. It included his most famous poem, Le vase brisé. He published more poetry before the outbreak of the Franco-Prussian War. This war, which he discussed in Impressions de la guerre (1872) and La France (1874), permanently damaged his health.

During his career, Prudhomme gradually shifted from the sentimental style of his first books towards a more personal style which unified the formality of the Parnassus school with his interest in philosophical and scientific subjects. One of his inspirations was clearly Lucretius's De rerum natura, whose first book he translated into verse. His philosophy was expressed in La Justice (1878) and Le Bonheur (1888). The extreme economy of means employed in these poems has, however, usually been judged as compromising their poetical quality without advancing their claims as works of philosophy. He was elected to the Académie française in 1881. Another distinction, Chevalier de la Légion d’honneur, was to follow in 1895.

After Le Bonheur, Prudhomme turned from poetry to write essays on aesthetics and philosophy. He published two important essays: L'Expression dans les beaux-arts (1884) and Réflexions sur l'art des vers (1892), a series of articles on Blaise Pascal in La Revue des Deux Mondes (1890), and an article on free will (La Psychologie du Libre-Arbitre, 1906) in the Revue de métaphysique et de morale.

== Nobel Prize ==
The first writer to receive the Nobel Prize for Literature (given "in special recognition of his poetic composition, which gives evidence of lofty idealism, artistic perfection and a rare combination of the qualities of both heart and intellect"), he devoted the bulk of the money he received to the creation of a poetry prize awarded by the Société des gens de lettres. He also founded, in 1902, the Société des poètes français with Jose-Maria de Heredia and Leon Dierx.

== Death ==
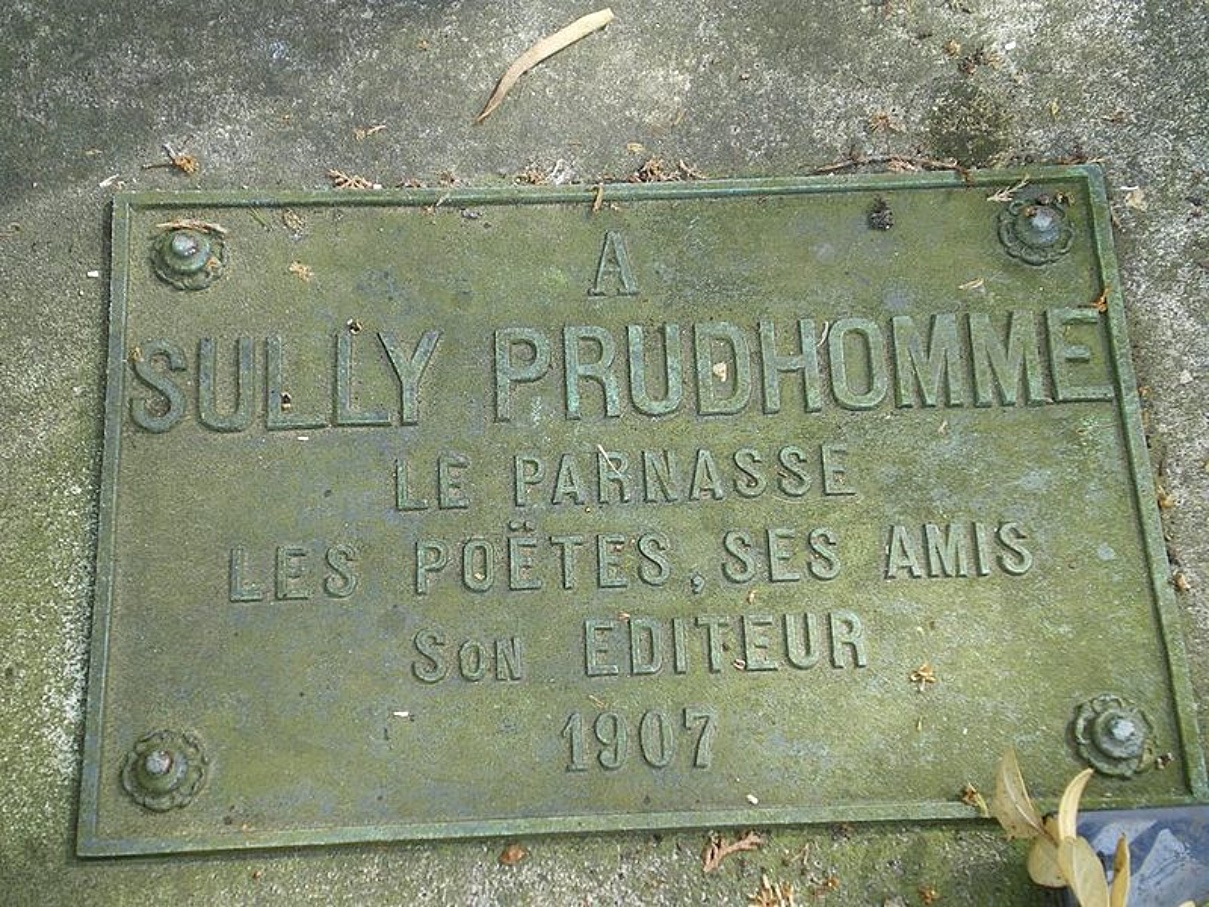
Grave of Sully Prudhomme at Père-Lachaise in Paris

At the end of his life, his poor health (which had troubled him ever since 1870) forced him to live almost as a recluse at Châtenay-Malabry, suffering attacks of paralysis while continuing to work on essays. He died suddenly on 6 September 1907, and was buried at Père-Lachaise in Paris.

== Bibliography ==
=== Poetry ===
- 1865: Stances et poèmes
- 1866: Les épreuves
- 1868: Croquis italiens
- 1869: Les solitudes: poésies [Les écuries d’Augias]
- 1872: Les destins
- 1874: La révolte des fleurs
- 1874: La France
- 1875: Les vaines tendresses
- 1876: Le zénith, previously published in Revue des deux mondes
- 1878: La justice
- 1865–1888: Poésie
- 1886: Le prisme, poésies diverses
- 1888: Le bonheur
- 1908: Épaves

=== Prose ===
- 1883–1908: Œuvres de Sully Prudhomme (poetry and prose), 8 volumes, A. Lemerre
- 1896: Que sais-je? (philosophy)
- 1901: Testament poétique (essays)
- 1905: La vraie religion selon Pascal (essays)
- 1922: Journal intime: lettres-pensée
