= Parnassianism =

19th-century French literary movement

Parnassianism (or Parnassism) was a name designating a group of French poets that began during the positivist period of the 19th century (1860s–1890s), occurring after romanticism and prior to symbolism. The style was influenced by the author Théophile Gautier as well as by the philosophical ideas of Arthur Schopenhauer.

== Origins and name ==
The name is derived from the original Parnassian poets' journal, Le Parnasse contemporain, itself named after Mount Parnassus, home of the Muses of Greek mythology. The anthology was first issued in 1866 and again in 1871 and 1876, including poems by Charles Leconte de Lisle, Théodore de Banville, Sully Prudhomme, Stéphane Mallarmé, Paul Verlaine, François Coppée, Nina de Callias, and José María de Heredia.

The Parnassians were influenced by Théophile Gautier and his doctrine of "art for art's sake". As a reaction to the less-disciplined types of romantic poetry and what they considered the excessive sentimentality and undue social and political activism of Romantic works, the Parnassians strove for exact and faultless workmanship, selecting exotic and (neo-)classical subjects that they treated with the rigidity of form and emotional detachment. Elements of this detachment were derived from the philosophical work of Schopenhauer.

The two most characteristic and most long-lasting members of the movement were Heredia and Leconte de Lisle.

== Transnational influences ==
Despite its French origins, Parnassianism was not restricted to French authors. Perhaps the most idiosyncratic of Parnassians, Olavo Bilac, Alberto de Oliveira's disciple, was an author from Brazil who managed carefully to craft verses and metre while maintaining a strong emotionalism in them. Polish Parnassians included Antoni Lange, Felicjan Faleński, Cyprian Kamil Norwid and Leopold Staff. A Romanian poet with Parnassian influences was Alexandru Macedonski. Florbela Espanca was a Parnassian Portuguese poet (Larousse), as was Cesário Verde.

Many prominent Turkish poets of Servet-i Fünun such as Tevfik Fikret, Yahya Kemal Beyatlı and Cenap Şahabettin were inspired by Parnassianism.

British poets such as Andrew Lang, Austin Dobson and Edmund Gosse were sometimes known as "English Parnassians" for their experiments in old (often originally French) forms such as the ballade, the villanelle and the rondeau, taking inspiration from French authors like Banville. Gerard Manley Hopkins used the term Parnassian pejoratively to describe competent but uninspired poetry, “spoken on and from the level of a poet’s mind”. He identified this trend particularly with the work of Alfred Tennyson, citing the poem "Enoch Arden" as an example.

== See also ==
- Zutiste
