= Goncourt brothers =

19th-century French naturalism writers

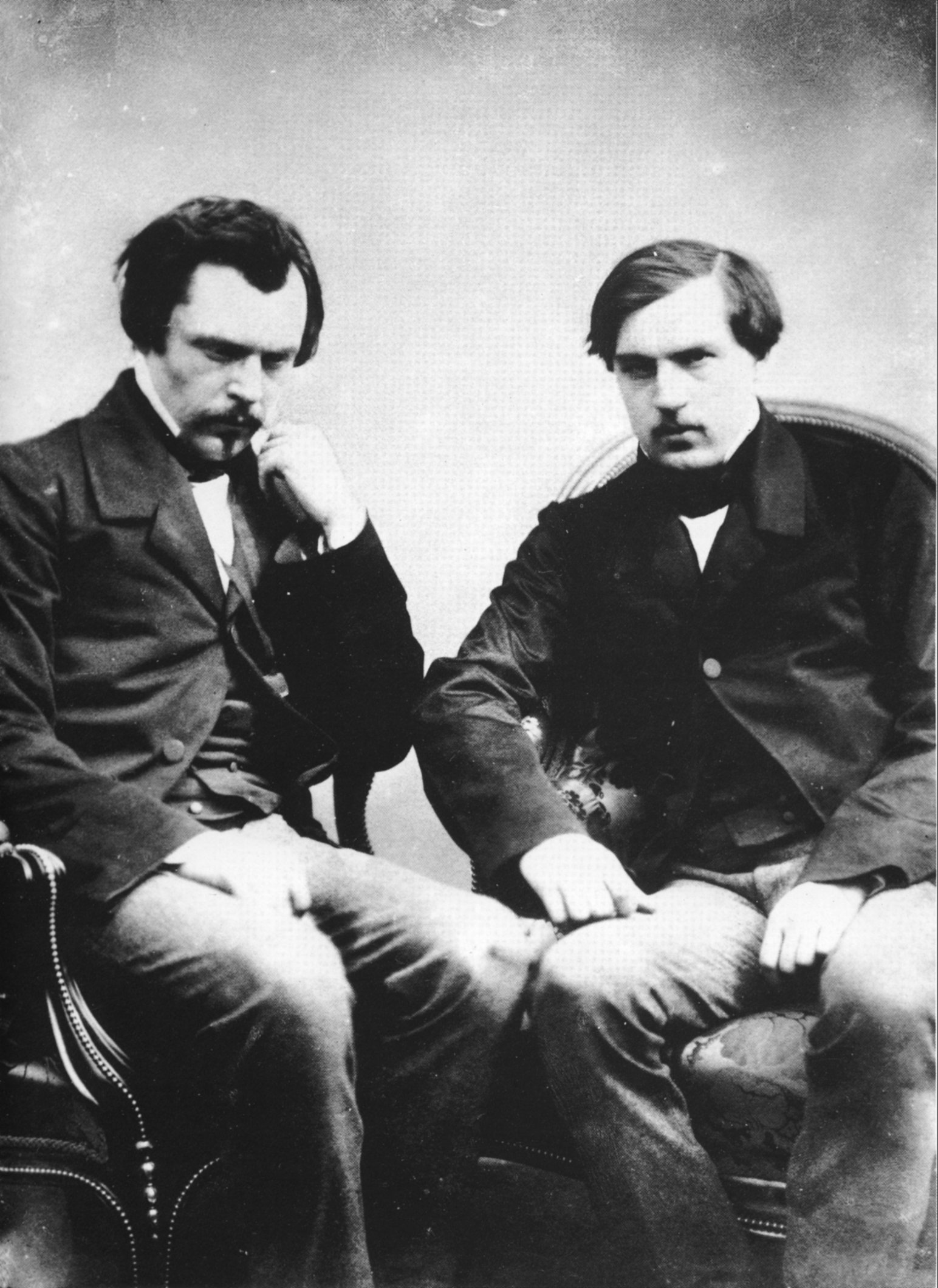
Edmond (left) with his brother Jules. Photographed by Félix Nadar

The Goncourt brothers (UK: /ɡɒnˈkʊər/, US: /ɡoʊŋˈkʊər/, French: [ɡɔ̃kuʁ]) were Edmond de Goncourt (1822–1896) and Jules de Goncourt (1830–1870), both French naturalism writers who, as collaborative sibling authors, were inseparable in life.

== Background ==
Edmond and Jules were born to minor aristocrats Marc-Pierre Huot de Goncourt and his second wife Annette-Cécile de Goncourt (née Guérin). Marc-Pierre was a retired cavalry officer and squadron leader in the Grande Armée of Napoléon I. The brothers' great-grandfather, Antoine Huot de Goncourt, purchased the seigneurie of the village of Goncourt in the Meuse Valley in 1786, and their grandfather Huot sat as a deputy in the National Assembly of 1789. The brothers' uncle, Pierre Antoine Victor Huot de Goncourt, was a deputy for the Vosges in the National Assembly between 1848 and 1851. In 1860, the brothers applied to the Keeper of the Seals for the exclusive use of the noble title "de Goncourt", but their claim was refused. They are buried together (in the same grave) in Montmartre Cemetery.

== Partnership ==
They formed a partnership that "is possibly unique in literary history. Not only did they write all their books together, they did not spend more than a day apart in their adult lives, until they were finally parted by Jules's death in 1870." They are known for their literary work and for their diaries, which offer an intimate view into the French literary society of the later 19th century.

== Career ==
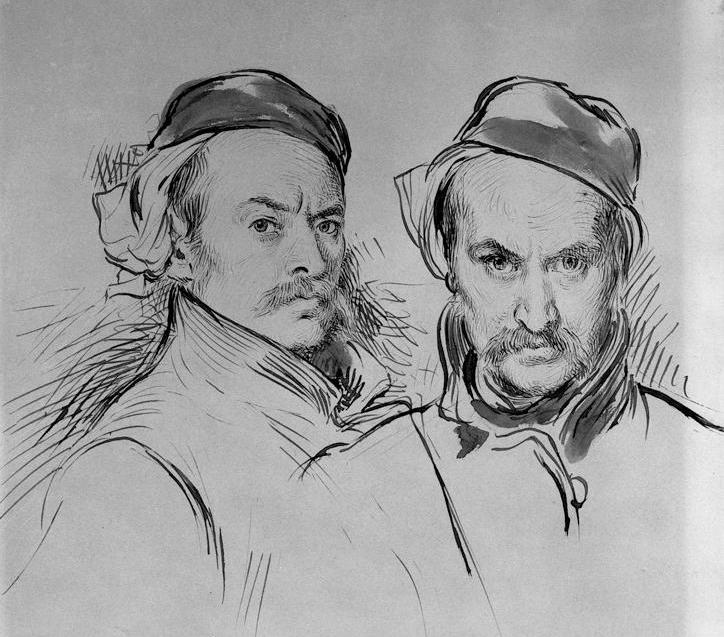
Jules and Edmond de Goncourt, an undated drawing by Alfred Dehodencq, Harvard Art Museums.

Their career as writers began with an account of a sketching holiday together. They then published books on aspects of 18th-century French and Japanese art and society. Their histories (Portraits intimes du XVIIIe siècle (1857), La Femme au XVIIIe siècle (1862), La du Barry (1878), and others) are made entirely out of documents, autograph letters, scraps of costume, engravings, songs, the unconscious self-revelations of the time. Their first novel, En 18..., had the misfortune of being published on December 2, 1851, the day of Napoléon III's coup d'état against the Second Republic. As such it was completely overlooked.

In their volumes (e.g., Portraits intimes du XVIII siecle), they dismissed the vulgarity of the Second Empire in favour of a more refined age. They wrote the long Journal des Goncourt from 1851, which gives a view of the literary and social life of their time. In 1852, the brothers were arrested, and ultimately acquitted, for an "outrage against public morality" after they quoted erotic Renaissance poetry in an article. From 1862, the brothers frequented the salon of the Princess Mathilde, where they mixed with fellow writers like Gustave Flaubert, Théophile Gautier, and Paul de Saint-Victor. In November 1862, they began attending bi-monthly dinners at Magny's restaurant with a group of intellectuals, writers, journalists, and artists. These included George Sand, Charles Augustin Sainte-Beuve, Flaubert, Ernest Renan, and Paul de Saint-Victor. From 1863, the brothers would systematically record the comments made at these dinners in the Journal.

In 1865, the brothers premiered their play Henriette Maréchal at the Comédie-Française, but its realism provoked protests and it was banned after only six performances.

When they came to write novels, it was with a similar attempt to give the inner, undiscovered, minute truths of contemporary existence. They published six novels, of which Germinie Lacerteux, 1865, was the fourth. It is based on the true case of their own maidservant, Rose Malingre, whose double life they had never suspected. After the death of Jules, Edmond continued to write novels in the same style.

According to the Encyclopædia Britannica Eleventh Edition:

[T]hey invented a new kind of novel, and their novels are the result of a new vision of the world, in which the very element of sight is decomposed, as in a picture of Monet. Seen through the nerves, in this conscious abandonment to the tricks of the eyesight, the world becomes a thing of broken patterns and conflicting colours, and uneasy movement. A novel of the Goncourts is made up of an infinite number of details, set side by side, every detail equally prominent. While a novel of Flaubert, for all its detail, gives above all things an impression of unity, a novel of the Goncourts deliberately dispenses with unity in order to give the sense of the passing of life, the heat and form of its moments as they pass. It is written in little chapters, sometimes no longer than a page, and each chapter is a separate notation of some significant event, some emotion or sensation which seems to throw sudden light on the picture of a soul. To the Goncourts humanity is as pictorial a thing as the world it moves in; they do not search further than "the physical basis of life," and they find everything that can be known of that unknown force written visibly upon the sudden faces of little incidents, little expressive moments. The soul, to them, is a series of moods, which succeed one another, certainly without any of the too arbitrary logic of the novelist who has conceived of character as a solid or consistent thing. Their novels are hardly stories at all, but picture-galleries, hung with pictures of the momentary aspects of the world.

=== Decadence ===
Decadence was a trend or movement in art in the late 1800s that seemed to focus on the decay and decline of civilization. Many scholars and writers have posited differing definitions or ideas of what decadence is. Arthur Symons says decadence is "An intense self-consciousness, a restless curiosity in research, an over-subtilizing refinement upon refinement, a spiritual and moral perversity." (The Decadent Movement in Literature). He also calls it "...really a new and beautiful and interesting disease." (From Arthur Symons, "The Decadent Movement in Literature). These different working definitions all in some way illustrate the decadent nature that the Goncourt Brothers conducted in their daily lives that was logged in their journals, both through their actions and in their writing. Geoff Dyer in his foreword to the book Pages from the Goncourt Journals says, "...the conversation among these men of letters becomes, as it often did, ‘filthy and depraved.’ Among all the talk of fornication, hookers, venereal disease, and drunkenness there is some literary discussion too—and not just about ‘the special aptitudes of writers suffering from constipation and diarrhoea.’" (pg. X). James M. Smith uses the Goncourt brothers as an example of decadent writers because of their stylistic experiments and their rejection of traditional narrative forms. Their approach reflects the decadent breakdown of literary structure as described by Bourget and others: their journals emphasize more about mood than what happens, more about how it sounds than what it means, and focusing on how it looks instead of what it says. Their rejection of standard storytelling lines up with Smith’s point that decadence causes the "disintegration of the whole… a decay of the unity of literary expression" (Smith, 644). In their diaries and fiction, the Goncourt brothers also reveal an almost obsessive interest in style, aesthetic effect, and psychological nuance all signs of decadent literature. Their experiments reflect the broader decadent aim of making each phrase stand out, even if that means the overall piece loses some clarity or structure. Arthur Symons observed that they made a "deliberate attempt… to remove the plot element from prose narrative fiction," (Smith, 645) aiming instead to capture "refined sensation and fleeting impression" (Smith, 645). This means they cared less about telling a clear story and more about capturing small sensory details, making their writing feel like a chain of emotional moments.

Jules and Edmond de Goncourt used the technique of etching in their literary style and structure that offered an overlooked form of influence. The technique of etching was known to influence the brother's imagery and vocabulary within their writings while also shaping their unique narrative form, styles, and themes. The Goncourt brothers were especially interested in contrast, fragmentation and artistic experimentation where they were inspired by the etching revival in 19th century France and were particularly influenced by artists such as Charles Mèryon They combined etching techniques such as line work, crosshatching, chiaroscuro, and accumulation to detail into their prose which were influenced by Mèyron. In their novels Manette Salomon, Madame Gervaisais, Germine Lacerteux, and, Charles Demailley the brothers use etching-terms such as raie (line), aiguille (needle), and intricate visual detail to parallel with the etched image.

During the 19th century era of print culture, etchings were more available than paintings and were issued widely in journals, salons, and private collections. Like artists, writers engaged with print a form of originality and reproduction. The Goncourt brothers used themes of darkness, contrast, madness, and ruin within their novels to amplify their moody aesthetic of 19th century etchings, specifically Charles Mèryon's depictions of Paris, the nighttime Seine, gothic infrastructure, and intricate detail. The Goncourt brothers’ ècriture artiste reflects a highly sophisticated style that prioritizes aesthetic experience over moral content. Their attention to detail, out of the ordinary vocabulary, and artistic experimentation correlates with the decadence movement's emphasis on beauty and sensation. Mèryons etchings which were used by the Goncourts as a model, which focused on Paris as a ghostly city in ruins marked by loss and transformation. In Manette Salomon, a sense of mental deterioration mirrors the decadent preoccupation with morbidity exploring psychological disturbance and decay. Their emphasis on etching reflected the decadence preference of technique, artifice, and stylization over naturalism.

=== Misogyny and their career ===
The Goncourt Brothers were known to be extremely misogynistic in their writing. They brought women down to a singular type, which was a version of a prostitute. Annie Ubersfeld has said, "Ce que disent les Goncourt des femmes est d'une banalité atroce à pleurer; ils ont jusqu'à l’excès, de la femme l'idée q'’ont les bons bourgeois de leur temps" ("What the Goncourt brothers say about women is terribly banal; they hold, to an extreme degree, the idea of women held by the respectable bourgeois of their time. "). On top of writing many terrible things about women, they also wrote a lot about their fetishes for said women. Much of their sense of women comes from the many portraits that they studied and the fact that they could not stand bourgeoise women. They did not like the separation between men and women that was very prominent starting in the seventeenth and eighteenth, and then particularly in the nineteenth century. They believed that eighteenth century women were superior to nineteenth century women, and they looked down on the women of their own time, which pointed towards a fetishization of the eighteenth century woman.

Jennifer Forrest describes their writing about women by saying, "unrelenting hatred and disgust characterizes their overall treatment of nineteenth century women." (47). They believed that the most superior woman of the eighteenth century was Marie-Antoinette, because she facilitated the end of the way that the monarchy worked in the time. They fetishized her, writing in detail about her impact on French fashion and generally about how much they admired her. They essentially believed that anything that went wrong with the nineteenth century was solely the fault of "la femme-homme d’affaires" (60). They were known as "certified admirers of the female sex," and were quite infamous for this fact.

Chapter four of Apter's book "Unmasking the Masquerade: Fetishism and Femininity from the Goncourt Brothers to Joan Riviere" explores the feminist ideology of the masquerade and the Freudian discourse of fetishism through the lens of literature from the Goncourt Brothers and their contemporaries. This article responds to Riviere's essay "Womanliness as a Masquerade" by recognizing how "both theories may be characterized in terms of a defensive posture toward the symbolic order of castration…" (65). Also, the study of sartorial language in the Goncourt brothers’ works reveals the expression of a female "sartorial super-ego." (65). The Goncourts’ reconstruction of eighteenth-century feminine culture focused on pretty and distinguished detail in manners of clothing, appearance, and expression in order to promote what Edmond termed "féminilité." These were the intangible qualities of a woman that were considered to be her innermost being–seduction, arousal, and deception. Indeed, "the Goncourts were notorious for their misogynistic view of the female sex, which they placed on par with animals" (67). Their novels and the infamous Journal capitalize on images of the insatiable sexual urges of women. Nevertheless, the Goncourt brothers also contributed to the medicalization of literature and the pathologization of the aristocratic class. This led to the debauchery of noble women being attributed to "emptiness, ennui, vapors, hypochondria, hysteria, and intellectual libertinage" (68). These descriptions as well as the Goncourt Brothers’ habit of diagnosing the consequences of promiscuity informed their misogynistic, pathological perspective that fetishized and promoted femininity and sexual desire to the detriment of women.

== Legacy ==
Edmond de Goncourt bequeathed his entire estate for the foundation and maintenance of the Académie Goncourt. Since 1903, the académie has awarded the Prix Goncourt, probably the most important literary prize in French literature.

The first English translation of Manette Salomon, translated by Tina Kover, was published in November 2017 by Snuggly Books.

== Works ==
Novels

- En 18... (1851)
- Sœur Philomène (1861)
- Renée Mauperin (1864)
- Germinie Lacerteux (1865)
- Manette Salomon (1867), translated into English by Tina Kover (Snuggly Books, 2017)
- Madame Gervaisais (1869)

and, by Edmond alone:

- La Fille Elisa (1878), translated into English as "Elisa" by Margaret Crosland (H. Fertig, 1975)
- Les Frères Zemganno (1879)
- La Faustin (1882)
- Chérie (1884)

=== Plays ===
- Henriette Maréchal (Performed at the Comédie-Française in 1865)
- La patrie en danger (Published 1873, performed at the Théâtre Libre in 1889)

=== Other ===
- La Révolution dans les moeurs (1854)
- Histoire de la société française pendant la Révolution (1854)
- Histoire de la société française pendant le Directoire (1855)
- Sophie Arnould (1857)
- Journal des Goncourt, 1851–1896
- Portraits intimes du XVIIIe siècle (1857)
- Histoire de Marie Antoinette (1858)
- Les Maîtresses de Louis XV (1860)
- La Femme au XVIIIe siècle (1862)
- La du Barry (1878)
- Madame de Pompadour (1878)
- La Duchesse de Chateauroux et ses soeurs (1879)
- L'Art du XVIIIe siècle (French Eighteenth Century Painters) (1859–1875)
