= Marie L. Shedlock =

Influential practitioner of the art of storytelling

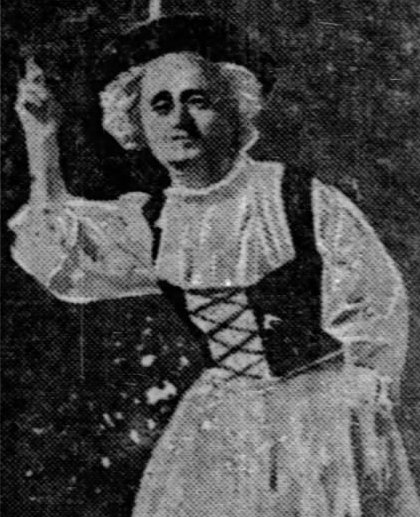
- Born: 5 May 1854; Boulogne
- Died: 17 January 1935 (aged 80)
- Occupation: Storyteller

Marie Louise Shedlock (1854–1935) was an early and influential practitioner of the art of storytelling. She recorded her advice on oral performance in her book The Art of the Story-Teller.

== Biography ==
Shedlock was born in Boulogne, France of English parents; her father was an engineer helping to build a railroad. Although she lived in England for a short time as a child, she returned to France, and ultimately went to Germany to complete her education.

Shedlock's first job was as a schoolteacher. She taught school in England from age 21. At age 36 she began her career as a storyteller, having a debut performance in London. At age 46 she ceased teaching and began her career as a professional storyteller. She had two extended and well-received tours in the United States.

Shedlock's first U. S. tour took place around 1900 and lasted seven years. Mary Wright Plummer, director of the Pratt Institute Library attended one of her public recitals and invited her to perform. Anne Carroll Moore head of the children's library at Pratt invited Shedlock to return to Pratt and tell stories to children. Her first American tour lasted seven years. After this first tour, Shedlock returned to London, later writing her two books. Shedlock's second U. S. tour began in 1915 and ran for five years.

Shedlock died in January 1935.

== Influence on others ==
Anna Cogswell Tyler a student at Pratt heard Shedlock perform and decided to become a professional storyteller herself. Tyler eventually became head of storytelling for the New York Public Library. Ruth Sawyer heard Shedlock reading the tales of Hans Christian Andersen at Columbia University. Sawyer "vowed that day to become a storyteller."

== Works ==
- Shedlock, Marie L. (1920). Eastern Stories and Legends. E.P. Dutton. "marie shedlock eastern stories and legends." (1920)
- Shedlock, Marie L. (1915). The Art of the Story-Teller. D. Appleton. "marie shedlock art of the storyteller."
- Shedlock, Marie L. (1899). A happy medium in all things; a comedy in two acts (with female characters only).
- de Goncourt, Edmond; Jules de Goncourt (1895). Edmond and Jules de Goncourt; with letters, and leaves from their journals. (compiled and translated by Marie Adelaide Belloc Lowndes and Marie Shedlock). London: William Heinemann. "marie shedlock."
- Shedlock, Marie. "Ten Songs: Eldorado (Sheet Music)". The Edgar Allan Poe Digital Collection. University of Texas Austin, Harry Ransom Center.
