= Emily Magpie =

English singer and producer

- Genres: alternative pop, bedroom pop
- Occupations: Singer; Songwriter; Producer
- Instruments: Vocals; Ukelele
- Years active: 2017–present

Emily Magpie is a singer-songwriter and producer based in Bristol.

== Background ==
Magpie was raised in Cornwall. During her adolescence, Emily took part in a jazz band. She has a background in acting and was an actor prior to her musical career.

== Career ==
In 2017, Magpie released her debut EP Same Stuff.

In 2018, she released her single "Leave it to Fate" before releasing the EP The Witching Hour. Magpie named the Salem Witch Trials as an inspiration for the EP. In 2018, she also released another EP titled Be Your Own Light.

In 2020, she released her debut album Let's Talk About the Weather. The album covers themes of the environment and climate change, and features sounds from nature.

Magpie released an EP titled When the Space Between Was so Much Less in 2022 with the label Silent Kid.

In 2023, she took part in the Future Sound of Bristol competition, where she won the third place prize. She also released an EP titled She.

Magpie released her second album There Are Other Forms Of Strength in 2024, which Magpie described as "vulnerable". In the same year, she performed at the Brighton Harbour Festival.

In 2025, she spoke at a conference about labels.

In 2026, she released another EP titled Howl.

== Artistry ==
Magpie's genre has been described as bedroom pop and alt pop. She has stated that she uses electronic tracks and uses her ukelele in the process of making her music. She has named oral storytelling as an influence on her lyrics.

== Discography ==
=== Albums ===
- Let's Talk About the Weather (2020)
- There Are Other Forms Of Strength (2024)

=== EPs ===
- Same Stuff (2017)
- The Witching Hour (2018)
- Be Your Own Light (2018)
- When the Space Between Was so Much Less (2022)
- She (2023)
- Howl (2026)

=== Singles ===
- "Leave It To Fate" (2018)
