= Goncourt Journal =

Diary by Edmond and Jules de Goncourt

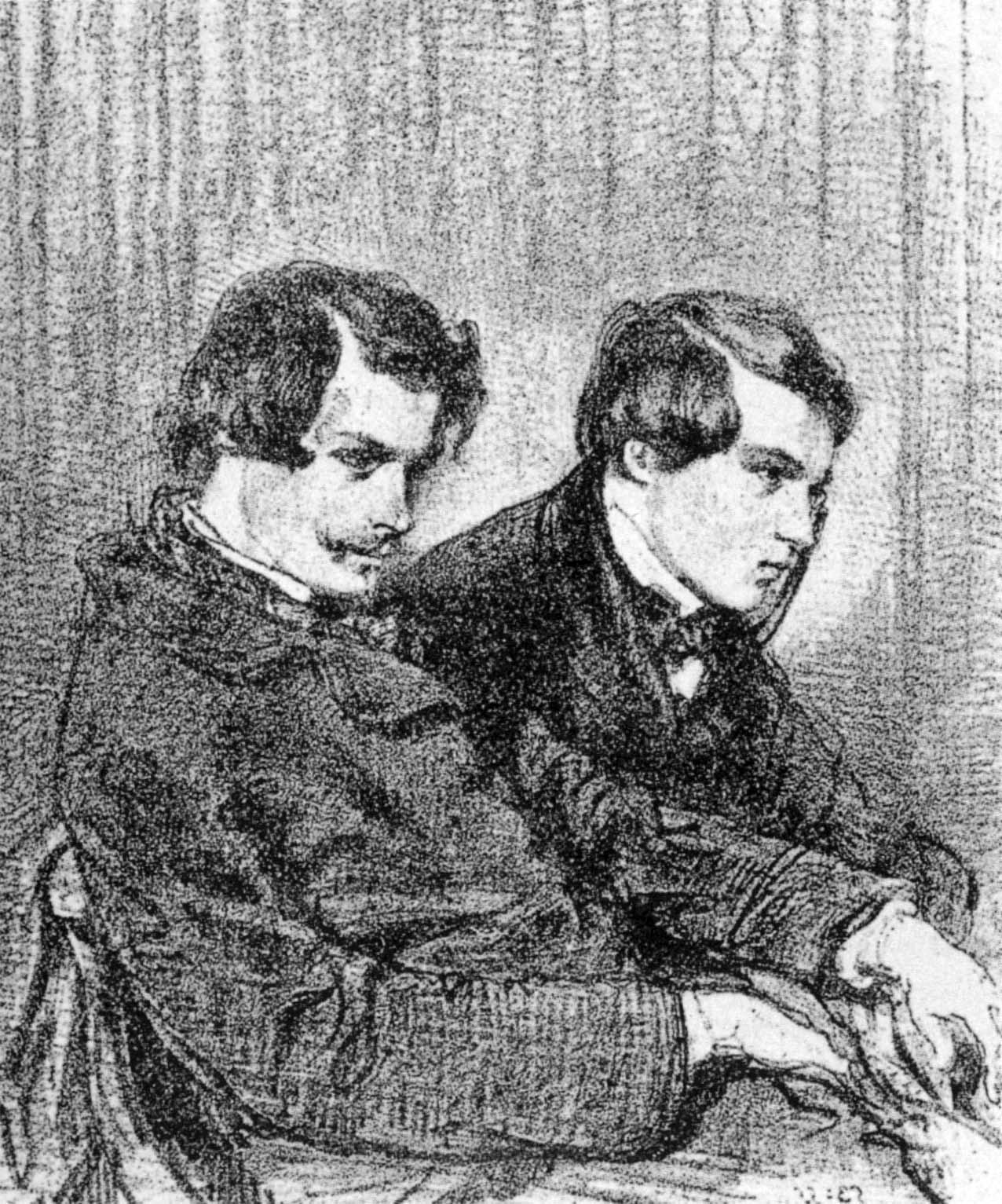
Edmond and Jules de Goncourt

The Goncourt Journal was a diary written in collaboration by the brothers Edmond and Jules de Goncourt from 1850 up to Jules' death in 1870, and then by Edmond alone up to a few weeks before his own death in 1896. It forms an unrivalled and entirely candid chronicle of the literary and artistic Parisian world in which they lived; "a world", it has been said, "of bitter rivalries and bitterer friendships, in which every gathering around a café table on the Grands Boulevards [was] a chance to raise one's status in the byzantine literary hierarchy".

Fear of lawsuits by the Goncourts' friends and their heirs prevented publication of anything but carefully chosen selections from the Journal for many years, but a complete edition of the original French text appeared in the 1950s in 22 volumes, and there have been several selective translations into English.

== The process of collaboration ==
The Goncourt brothers formed a very close literary partnership. Not only were all of their novels, dramas and non-fiction works written in collaboration until Jules' death but, more surprisingly, so was their Journal. The Journal was produced by a process Edmond called "dual dictation", one brother dictating to the other and each revising the other's work. Their styles were so similar that it is impossible to tell which brother was writing any particular passage. For the most part they wrote the Journal late at night, without much consideration about literary style, and there are therefore few of the laboured mannerisms that characterize their novels. Edmond himself admitted that because the journal entries were "hastily set down on paper and not always re-read, our syntax is sometimes happy-go-lucky and not all our words have passports", and they particularly delighted in accurately recording the slanginess and vulgarity of ordinary speech.

The collaboration came to an end with Jules' decline and early death from syphilis, recorded by his brother in excruciating detail. When that story drew to its close Edmond initially decided to abandon the Journal, but he took it up again in time to give a detailed description of life during the Franco-Prussian War, the siege of Paris, and the Commune. Some critics find that the Journal improved when Edmond resumed it without Jules.

== The Journal's accuracy ==
The many accounts of conversations in the Journal were aided by Edmond's excellent memory, and, according to Flaubert, by Jules' habit of jotting notes on his shirt-cuff on the spot. Ludovic Halévy, who was present at many of these conversations, gave the brothers credit for extreme accuracy, and similarly the narrator of Proust's Le Temps retrouvé thought that Edmond de Goncourt "knew how to listen, just as he knew how to see"; but some among the Goncourts' contemporaries claimed that the brothers either consciously or unconsciously distorted the conversations they recorded. The painter Jacques Blanche, for example, said that "nothing is less true than their journals", though André Gide, who thoroughly enjoyed the Journal's accounts of conversations, retorted that that would make the Goncourts' achievement as original artists all the greater.

== Treatment of their friends ==
The Goncourts' Journal was started on the same day that they published their first novel, 2 December 1851, which was unluckily also the day that Louis-Napoleon launched his coup d'état, leading to the imposition of martial law in Paris. In this turmoil the novel passed almost unnoticed. The Goncourts' disappointment over this failure was duly recorded in the Journal, thereby setting the dominant tone for the remaining 45 years. Poor sales, poor reviews, and the undeserved successes of their literary friends are recorded in meticulous detail. "Oh, if one of Dostoyevsky's novels, whose black melancholy is regarded with such indulgent admiration, were signed with the name of Goncourt, what a slating it would get all along the line." Zola was one friend who came in for especially barbed comment, since the Goncourts felt that his subject matter and literary techniques had been borrowed from theirs. "The critics may say what they like about Zola, they cannot prevent us, my brother and myself, from being the John-the-Baptists of modern neurosis."

Some few friends did come in for sympathetic treatment, notably Princess Mathilde Bonaparte, Paul Gavarni, Théophile Gautier, Alphonse Daudet and, initially at least, Gustave Flaubert and Paul de Saint-Victor. The critic Charles Augustin Sainte-Beuve regularly appeared in the Journal, as did the painter Edgar Degas and the sculptor Auguste Rodin. Appearances are also made by Heinrich Heine, Charles Baudelaire, Victor Hugo, Ernest Renan, Hippolyte Taine, Joris-Karl Huysmans, Guy de Maupassant, Alexandre Dumas père and fils, Stéphane Mallarmé, Georg Brandes, Ivan Turgenev and Oscar Wilde. Not surprisingly, the often backbiting tone of the Journal led to strained relations with Edmond's surviving friends when they came to read his treatment of them in the published volumes. As late as the 1950s the Daudet family, concerned for the reputation of their ancestor Alphonse, were trying to block publication of the complete Journal.

== Publication ==
A few carefully chosen selections from the Journal were published by the Goncourts in a now little-known book, Idées et Sensations (1866; new edition 1877). In 1886 Edmond published in Le Figaro some extracts from the Journal dating from the years before Jules' death, and the following year a more substantial selection of letters from the same years appeared in book form under the title Journal des Goncourt: Mémoires de la vie littéraire. Eight more volumes were published at the rate of roughly one a year, some being first serialized in L'Écho de Paris. The last volume appeared in May 1896, two months before Edmond's death.

== Reception ==
Le Figaro called the first volume a masterpiece of conceit. Worse, after three weeks only 2000 copies had been sold, provoking Edmond to say "Really, for a result like that it is not worth risking duels". Le Figaro continued its attacks, writing on the publication of Edmond's fourth volume "He listens and thinks he can hear, he looks and thinks he can see…Of the literary élite of his age…the best of their kind, all that he has managed to give us most of the time is a grotesque and often repulsive picture". The seventh volume called forth hostile articles in the Journal des débats and the Courrier français, while Le Figaro reported that a Funeral Committee was being set up on Edmond's behalf. Excrement was sent to him through the post.

On the other hand Anatole France wrote that "this perfectly private journal is at the same time perfectly literary", and absolved the Goncourts of indiscretion because "[t]hey neither heard nor saw except in art and for art". To American critics the Goncourts' indiscretion naturally seemed less immediately alarming than to most of their French colleagues. The Atlantic Monthly thought that in fifty years time it would be "the most fascinating and vivid history in existence of the literary and artistic life of Paris during the last half of [the 19th] century", but that its portrait of the close partnership of the Goncourts themselves was of still greater interest. Henry James, writing in The Fortnightly Review, thought that both the Journal and its authors would have been improved if they had not restricted their social life to a narrow coterie: "The Journal…is mainly a record of resentment and suffering, and to this circumstance they attribute many causes; but we suspect that the real cause is for them too the inconvenience from which we suffer as readers – simply the want of space and air."

After Edmond's death Proust paid the Journal the tribute of including a pastiche of it in his À la recherche du temps perdu, and indeed the Journal's obsessive collecting of the most minute details of its authors' social life and rendering of them into literary art has been said to anticipate the supposed innovations of Proust. In 1940 Christopher Isherwood confided in his own journal that "Here, gossip achieves the epigrammatic significance of poetry".

As late as 1962 one reviewer found it necessary to warn his more delicate readers about the scabrousness of much of the conversation recorded, and in 1971 the Goncourts' translators George J. Becker and Edith Philips wrote of the emotional detachment, even heartlessness, to be found everywhere in the journal except in those passages that depict Edmond's relationship with his brother and with Daudet. In more recent years Jacques Noiray called it "a modern Comédie humaine of the republic of letters", while according to another literary scholar, David Baguley, the Journal is "an immense machine for transforming lived experience into documentary form", to be used as raw material by the Goncourts when writing their novels.

In the 21st century the Journal's repute is as high as ever. The German satirist Harald Schmidt has called it "the greatest gossip in world literature – it's sensational!", and for the historian Graham Robb it is "one of the longest, most absorbing, and most enlightening diaries in European literature". The critic Adam Kirsch attributes the modern age's interest in late-19th century French literary life to the Goncourt Journal.

== Modern editions ==
By Edmond's will, the manuscripts of the Journal were bequeathed to the Académie Goncourt, itself a creation of the same will, with instructions that they be strictly protected from public scrutiny for 20 years in the vaults of the Bibliothèque nationale de France, after which they were to be made public either by allowing access to them or by publication in print. In the event, the Académie did neither of these things in 1916, fearing libel actions, though the public were finally allowed to see the manuscripts in 1925. In 1935-1936 the Académie did produce an "édition définitive", albeit a selective one, in nine volumes, and in 1945 they announced that a complete edition would appear the following year. This proved to be far too optimistic, the first editor, Robert Burnand, still having not brought the project to completion at his death in 1953. The editorship was taken over by Robert Ricatte, and it was finally published in 22 volumes between 1956 and 1959. A new multi-volume edition, the work of a large editorial team under the direction of Jean-Louis Cabanès, began to appear in 2005.

== Translations ==
No complete translation of the Goncourt Journal into English has ever appeared, but there have been several selections. The first, Edmond and Jules de Goncourt: With Letters and Leaves from their Journals, compiled and translated by Marie Belloc and Marie L. Shedlock, appeared in two volumes as early as 1895, before the nine volumes of Edmond de Goncourt's edition had yet been completed. This was followed by Julius West's The Journal of the Goncourts in 1908, and by Lewis Galantière's The Goncourt Journals 1851–1870 in 1937. In 1962 Oxford University Press published Robert Baldick's much-praised Pages from the Goncourt Journal, reprinted in 1984 by Penguin Books and in 2006 by The New York Review of Books. George J. Becker has also edited and translated two thematic selections: Paris Under Siege, 1870–1871 (1969), and (in collaboration with Edith Philips) Paris and the Arts, 1851–1896 (1971).
