= Jacques Bins, comte de Saint-Victor =

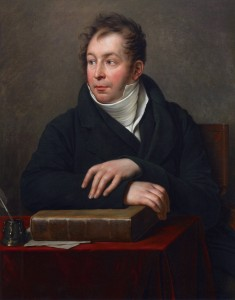
- Born: 1772; Fort Dauphin, Saint Domingue (now Haiti)
- Died: 1858 (aged 85–86); Paris, France
- Occupations: Poet, Man of letters
- Children: Paul de Saint-Victor

Jacques-Maximilien Benjamin Bins, comte de Saint-Victor (1772–1858) was a French poet and man of letters.

== Personal ==
Bins de Saint-Victor was born in Fort Dauphin, Saint Domingue (now Fort-Liberté, Haiti) on the island of Hispaniola in 1772. At the time of his birth, Saint Domingue was a French colony. He died in Paris in 1858.

His son, Paul de Saint-Victor, became a well-known essayist and critic.

== Career ==
During the First Empire, Bins de Saint-Victor was arrested as a royalist conspirator and incarcerated at Paris. After the fall of Napoleon, he was one of the editors of the Journal des débats and also worked on the Drapeau blanc. Having tried without success to found a bookstore with Félicité Robert de Lamennais, he spent some time in the United States. On his return he worked at the La France newspaper.

In addition to his poetical works and a verse translation of Anacreon, he published numerous historical studies as well as three opera libretti.

== Works ==
=== Poems ===
- Amour et galanterie dans le genre de Faublas, 2 vol., 1801
- L'Espérance, poème, 1802
- Les Grands Poètes malheureux, 1802
- Le Voyage du poète, poème, 1806
- Odes d'Anacréon, traduites en vers sur le texte de Brunck, 1810
- Ode sur la Révolution française et sur la chute du tyran, 1814
- Ode sur la première et la seconde Restauration du trône, 1815
- Œuvres poétiques, 1822

=== Essays and correspondence ===
- Musée des antiques, dessiné et gravé par Pierre Bouillon, avec des notices explicatives par Jacques Bins de Saint-Victor, 3 vol., 1810-1821
- Préface des Soirées de Saint-Pétersbourg de Joseph de Maistre-Edition de 1922.
- Tableau historique et pittoresque de Paris depuis les Gaulois jusqu'à nos jours, 3 vol., 1808-1809; 2nd édition augmentée, 8 vol., 1822-1827
- Quelques observations sur la lettre de Fouché au duc de Wellington, suivies du texte de cette lettre et de quelques notes explicatives, 1817
- Atlas du Tableau historique et pittoresque de Paris depuis les Gaulois jusqu'à nos jours, 214 planches, 1827
- Documents historiques, critiques, apologétiques concernant la Compagnie de Jésus, 3 vol., 1827-1830
- Lettres sur les États-Unis d'Amérique, écrites en 1832 et 1833, et adressées à M. le Cte O'Mahony, 2 vol., 1835
- Correspondance littéraire, découverte d'une petite mystification, 1837
- De l'Origine et de la nature du pouvoir d'après les monuments historiques, ou Études sur l'histoire universelle, 1840
- Les Fleurs des saints. Actes des saints martyrs rédigés et classés d'après l'ordre chronologique, 1845

=== Opera libretti ===
- La rivale d'elle-même, opéra-comique in one act, music by Jean-Pierre Solié, premiered at the Salle Favart, 3 October 1800
- L'habit du chevalier de Grammont, opéra-comique in one act, music by Eler, premiered at the Théâtre Feydeau, 6 December 1803
- Uthal, opera in one act in verse imitated from Ossian, music by Méhul, premiered at the Salle Favart, 17 May 1806
