= Rosemary Lloyd =

Australian literary scholar (born 1949)

Rosemary Lloyd FAHA
- Born: 19 September 1949 (age 77); Adelaide, Australia
- Occupation: Literary scholar
- Spouse: Paul Lloyd (m. 1971)
- Awards: Guggenheim Fellowship (2002); Fellow of the Australian Academy of the Humanities (2009)

Academic background
- Education: University of Adelaide; University of Cambridge
- Thesis: Baudelaire's literary criticism (1978)
- Doctoral advisor: Alison Fairlie

Academic work
- Discipline: French literature
- Institutions: University of Cambridge; Indiana University Bloomington

Rosemary Helen Lloyd FAHA (née Furness; born 19 September 1949) is an Australian literary scholar. She has written, edited, or translated more than a dozen books in French literature. She taught at the University of Cambridge and Indiana University Bloomington, where she was chair of the Department of French and Italian and a Rudy Professor. She is a 2002 Guggenheim Fellow and 2009 Fellow of the Australian Academy of the Humanities.

== Biography ==
Rosemary Helen Lloyd was born on 19 September 1949 in Adelaide. Her parents worked in medical fields, with her father Eric Taylor Furness FRACOG FRCOG an obstetrician and her mother Elwyn (née Smart) Furness a dietitian. She studied French and German at the University of Adelaide, where she became interested in 19th-century French poetry and obtained her BA in 1972 and MA in 1975. She obtained her PhD from the University of Cambridge in 1978; her doctoral dissertation Baudelaire's literary criticism was supervised by Alison Fairlie. She returned to Cambridge for her LittD in 2001.

Lloyd taught at the University of Cambridge Department of French from 1979 to 1990, being promoted from assistant lecturer to lecturer in 1984. She joined the Indiana University Bloomington as professor of French in 1990, and was promoted to Rudy Professor of French in 1999. She chaired IU's Department of French and Italian from 1995 to 1999. She was also a fellow of New Hall, Cambridge from 1978 to 1990. She was a 1989-1990 Leverhulme Fellow, a 1990 Camargo Foundation Fellow, and a 1998 National Endowment for the Humanities Fellow.

Lloyd specializes in 19th-century French literature and art. She has written several books on French literature, including The Land of Lost Content (1992), Closer & Closer Apart: Jealousy in Literature (1995), Mallarmé: The Poet and his Circle (1999), Baudelaire's World (2002), Shimmering in a Transformed Light: Writing the Still Life (2005), and Charles Baudelaire (2008). She also co-edited the sixth volume of the 1994-2001 Champion Press edition of Théodore de Banville's Œuvres poétiques completes. In 2002, she was awarded a Guggenheim Fellowship for "a study of the still life in art and letters". She was appointed a Fellow of the Australian Academy of the Humanities in 2009. She also specializes in Australian literature and arts, teaching courses on them in IU and writing articles on both fields.

Lloyd married teacher Paul Lloyd on 16 January 1971. Following her retirement from IU, she moved back to South Australia.

== Bibliography ==
=== Authored monographs ===
- Baudelaire et Hoffmann: Affinités et Influences (1979) (Note: Reviews of this book:)
- Baudelaire's Literary Criticism (1981) (Note: Reviews of this book:)
- Mallarme: Poésies (1984) (Note: Reviews of this book:)
- Madame Bovary (1990)
- The Land of Lost Content (1992) (Note: Reviews of this book:)
- Closer & Closer Apart: Jealousy in Literature (1995) (Note: Reviews of this book:)
- Mallarmé: The Poet and His Circle (2000) (Note: Reviews of this book:)
- Baudelaire's World (2002) (Note: Reviews of this book:)
- Shimmering in a Transformed Light: Writing the Still Life (2005) (Note: Reviews of this book:)
- Charles Baudelaire (2008) (Note: Reviews of this book:)

=== Edited volumes ===
- Selected Letters of Charles Baudelaire: The Conquest of Solitude (1986; as translator and editor) (Note: Reviews of this book:)
- Selected Letters of Stéphane Mallarme (1988; as translator and editor) (Note: Reviews of this book:)
- Mallarmé, the Arts and Theory: Special Issue: Yearbook of Comparative and General Literature (1994, ed. with Gilbert D. Chaitin)
- Revolutions in Writing: Readings in Nineteenth-Century French Prose (1996; as translator)
- Women Seeking Expression: France 1789-1914 (2000; ed. with Brian Nelson) (Note: Reviews of this book:)
- The Cambridge Companion to Baudelaire (2005, as editor) (Note: Reviews of this book:)
- Magnificent Obsessions: Honouring the Lives of Hazel Rowley (2013, co-edited with Jean Fornasiero)
