= Bourmont =

Commune in Haute-Marne, France

- Part of Bourmont-entre-Meuse-et-Mouzon
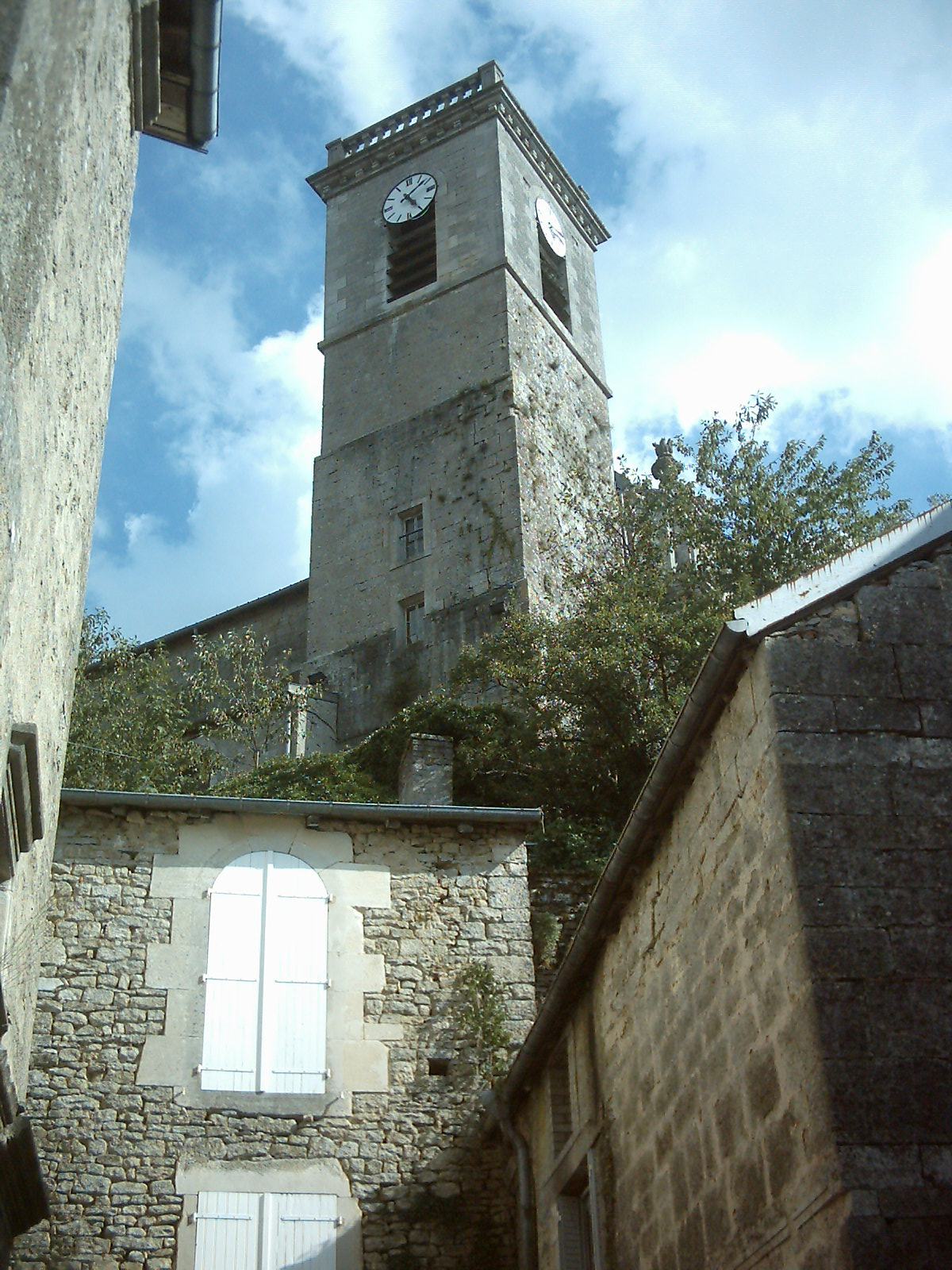

- Coat of arms
- Location of Bourmont
- Location within France Location within Grand Est
- Coordinates: 48°11′40″N 5°35′24″E
- Country: France
- Region: Grand Est
- Department: Haute-Marne
- Arrondissement: Chaumont
- Canton: Poissons
- Commune: Bourmont-entre-Meuse-et-Mouzon
- Area^{1}: 16.07 km^{2} (6.20 sq mi)
- Elevation: 410 m (1,350 ft)
- Population (2023): 432
  - Density: 26.9/km^{2} (69.6/sq mi)
- Time zone: UTC+01:00 (CET)
  - Summer (DST): UTC+02:00 (CEST)
- Postal code: 52150
- ^{1} French Land Register data, which excludes lakes, ponds, glaciers > 1 km^{2} (0.386 sq mi or 247 acres) and river estuaries.

Bourmont (French pronunciation: [buʁmɔ̃]) is a former commune in the Haute-Marne department in northeastern France. On 1 June 2016, it was merged into the new commune of Bourmont-entre-Meuse-et-Mouzon.

== See also ==
- Communes of the Haute-Marne department
