= Bourmont-entre-Meuse-et-Mouzon =

- Commune
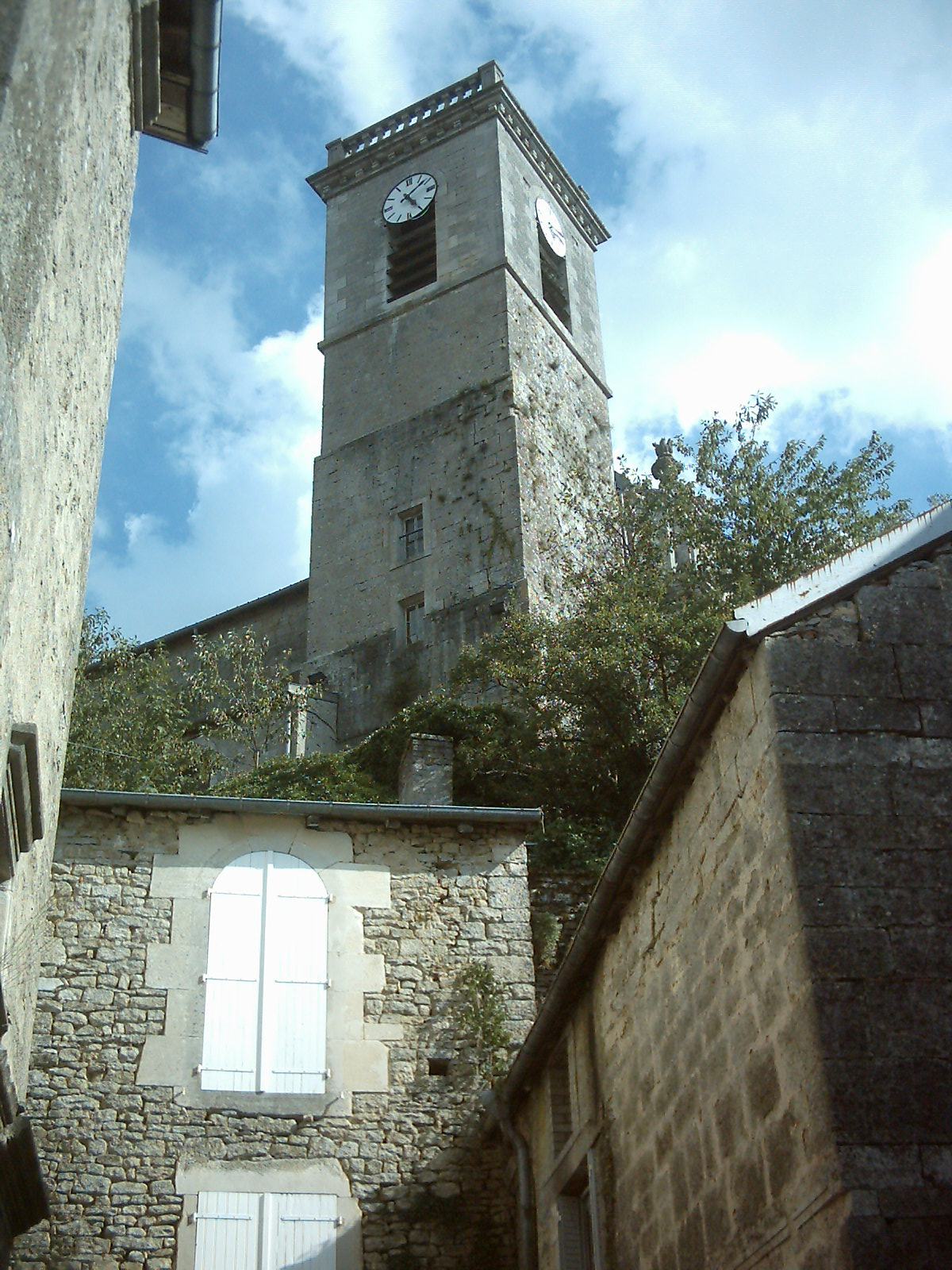
- The church in Bourmont

- Coat of arms
- Location of Bourmont-entre-Meuse-et-Mouzon
- Location within France Location within Grand Est
- Coordinates: 48°11′40″N 5°35′24″E
- Country: France
- Region: Grand Est
- Department: Haute-Marne
- Arrondissement: Chaumont
- Canton: Poissons
- Intercommunality: Meuse Rognon

Government
  - Mayor (2020–2026): Jonathan Haselvander
- Area^{1}: 42.55 km^{2} (16.43 sq mi)
- Elevation: 410 m (1,350 ft)
- Population (2023): 740
  - Density: 17/km^{2} (45/sq mi)
- Time zone: UTC+01:00 (CET)
  - Summer (DST): UTC+02:00 (CEST)
- INSEE/Postal code: 52064 /52150
- ^{1} French Land Register data, which excludes lakes, ponds, glaciers > 1 km^{2} (0.386 sq mi or 247 acres) and river estuaries.

Bourmont-entre-Meuse-et-Mouzon (French pronunciation: [buʁmɔ̃ ɑ̃tʁ møz e muzɔ̃], literally Bourmont between Meuse and Mouzon) is a commune in the Haute-Marne department of eastern France. The municipality was established on 1 June 2016 by merger of the former communes of Bourmont (the seat) and Nijon. On 1 January 2019, the former commune Goncourt was merged into Bourmont-entre-Meuse-et-Mouzon.

== See also ==
- Communes of the Haute-Marne department
