= Nijon =

- Part of Bourmont-entre-Meuse-et-Mouzon
- Location of Nijon
- Location within France Location within Grand Est
- Coordinates: 48°11′37″N 5°38′30″E
- Country: France
- Region: Grand Est
- Department: Haute-Marne
- Arrondissement: Chaumont
- Canton: Poissons
- Commune: Bourmont-entre-Meuse-et-Mouzon
- Area^{1}: 7.71 km^{2} (2.98 sq mi)
- Elevation: 326 m (1,070 ft)
- Population (2022): 95
  - Density: 12/km^{2} (32/sq mi)
- Time zone: UTC+01:00 (CET)
  - Summer (DST): UTC+02:00 (CEST)
- Postal code: 52150
- ^{1} French Land Register data, which excludes lakes, ponds, glaciers > 1 km^{2} (0.386 sq mi or 247 acres) and river estuaries.

Nijon (French pronunciation: [niʒɔ̃]) is a former commune in the Haute-Marne department in north-eastern France. On 1 June 2016, it was merged into the new commune of Bourmont-entre-Meuse-et-Mouzon. Its population was 95 in 2022.

== See also ==
- Communes of the Haute-Marne department
