= Jules de Goncourt =

French writer (1830–1870)

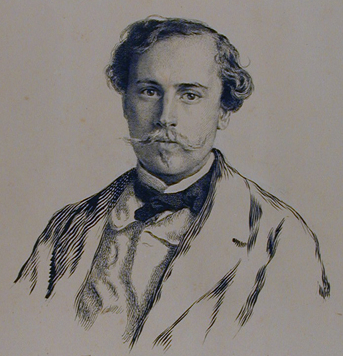
Illustration of Goncourt by Ernst Friedrich von Liphart

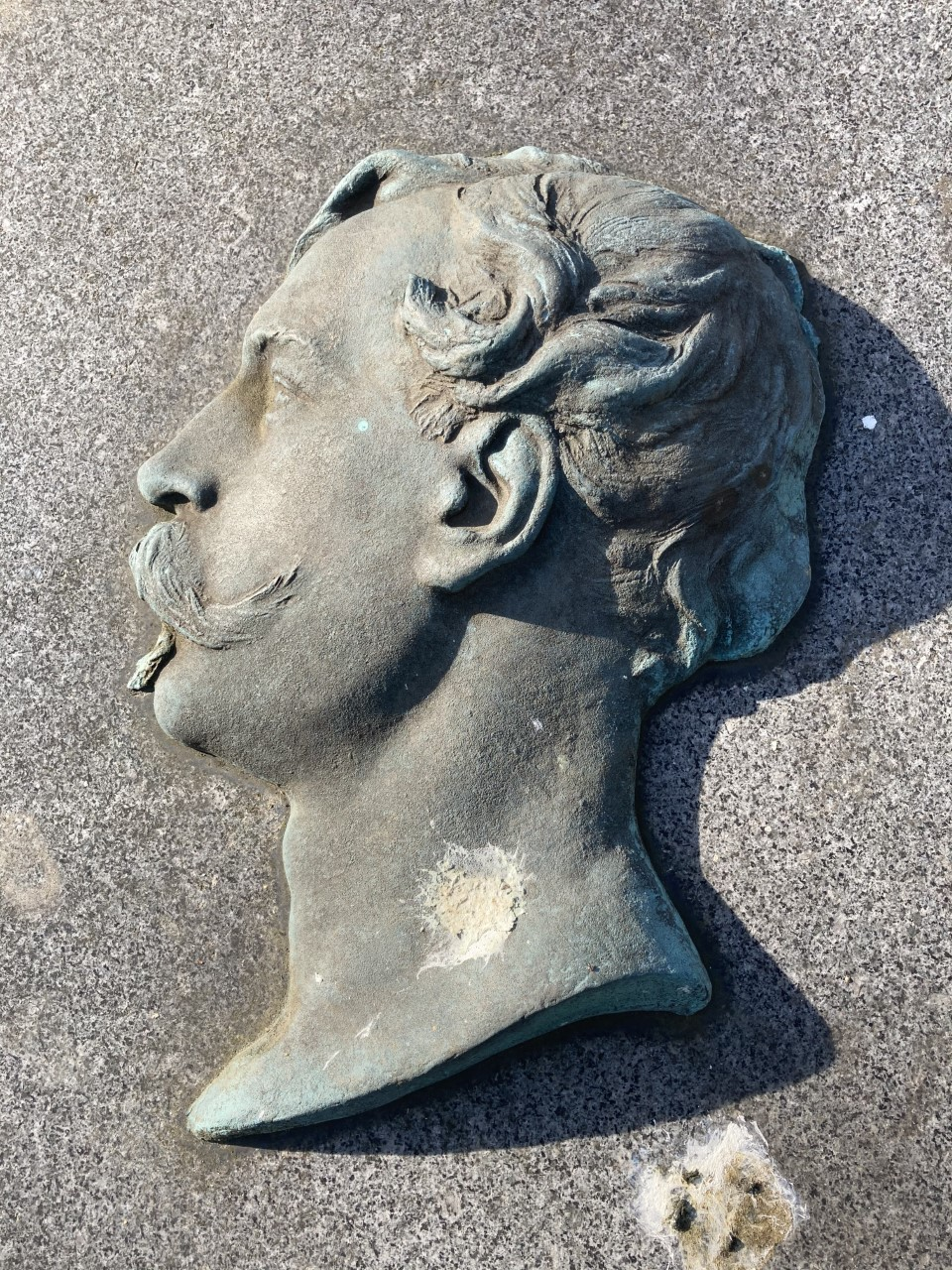
Profile on his grave.

Jules Alfred Huot de Goncourt (pronounced [ʒyl də ɡɔ̃kuʁ]; 17 December 1830 – 20 June 1870) was a French writer, who published books together with his brother Edmond. Jules was born and died in Paris. His death at the age of 39 was at Auteuil of a stroke brought on by syphilis.

The Prix Goncourt is awarded annually in his honor.

== Biography ==
=== Background ===
Jules de Goncourt was born in Paris, the fourth child of a former cavalry officer and squadron leader in the Grande Armée of Napoléon I, Marc-Pierre Huot de Goncourt, and his wife Annette-Cécile de Goncourt (née Guérin). Between Jules and his older brother Edmond were born two sisters who died at young ages, Nephtalie (1824–1825) and Émilie (1829–1832). Jules' paternal grandfather, Huot de Goncourt, sat as a deputy in the National Assembly of 1789. At the Lycée Condorcet, which he attended from 1842 to 1848, he was a strong student, obtaining two accessits in Greek and Latin in the Concours général. Both parents died while their sons were still young; after their mothers' death in 1848, Jules and Edmond inherited a legacy which gave them financial independence and allowed them to pursue their artistic interests.

=== Career ===
The two brothers initially focused on art history scholarship, publishing books on late 18th century history and the "evolution of an age from the objects and articles of its social existence". The two brothers shared a love for 18th century art, assembling a large and esteemed collection of fine and decorative art from the period, as well as ephemera like letters, drawings, and prints. From 1856, Jules and Edmond published a series of essays called "L'Art du XVIIIe Siècle" (The Art of the 18th Century), which came to encompass 12 fascicles and was not finished until 1875. In the 1860s the brothers published novels characterized by Naturalism and an examination of the different social classes, which anticipates the work of later authors like Émile Zola and George Moore. Germinie Lacerteux (1864) is "one of the first realistic French novels of working class life" and was based on the life of the brother's housekeeper Rose, who stole from them to fund a secret life of orgies and sexual encounters. In 1862, Jules was imprisoned for several days in the Hôtel des Haricots for refusing to serve in the National Guard. In 1868, the brothers moved to the Villa Montmorency in the Parisian suburb of Auteuil. The house became something of a tourist attraction because of the brothers' collections, with newspapers publishing articles about it and strangers writing for permission to visit.

After Jules's death in 1870, Edmond finished their uncompleted collaborations, including studies of three of Louis XV's mistresses (Madame de Pompadour, Madame du Barry, and the Duchess of Châteauroux) and a monograph on the artist Paul Gavarni. In 1885 Edmond published a selection of Jules's letters. He also continued the Journal, which the two brothers had begun in 1851, continuing it until his own death in 1896. From 1887 to 1896, Edmond published nine volumes of the journal.

Jules de Goncourt is buried with his brother Edmond in the Cimetière de Montmartre.

== Works ==
With Edmond de Goncourt:

- La Revolution dans les moeurs (1854)
- Histoire de la Société Française pendant la Révolution (1854)
- Histoire de la Société Française pendant le Directoire (1855)
- Une Voiture de Masques (1856)
- Les Actrices (Armande) (1856)
- Sophie Arnauld (1857)
- Portraits Intimes du XVIIIe Siècle (1857–1858)
- Histoire de Marie Antoinette (1858)
- L'Art du XVIIIe Siècle (1859–1882)

=== Novels ===
- Les Hommes de Lettres (1860)
- Sœur Philomène (1861)
- Renée Mauperin (1864)
- Germinie Lacerteux (1865)
- Manette Salomon (1867)
- Madame Gervaisais (1869)
- Journal des Goncourt (published posthumously)

=== Plays ===
- Henriette Maréchal (Performed at the Comédie-Française in 1865)
- La patrie en danger (Published 1873, performed at the Théâtre Libre in 1889)

=== Other ===
- Lettres de Jules de Goncourt (1885) (published posthumously)

== See also ==
- Goncourt brothers, which describes the nature of the partnership and their creative style.
