= Oral storytelling =

Tradition between the storyteller and their audience

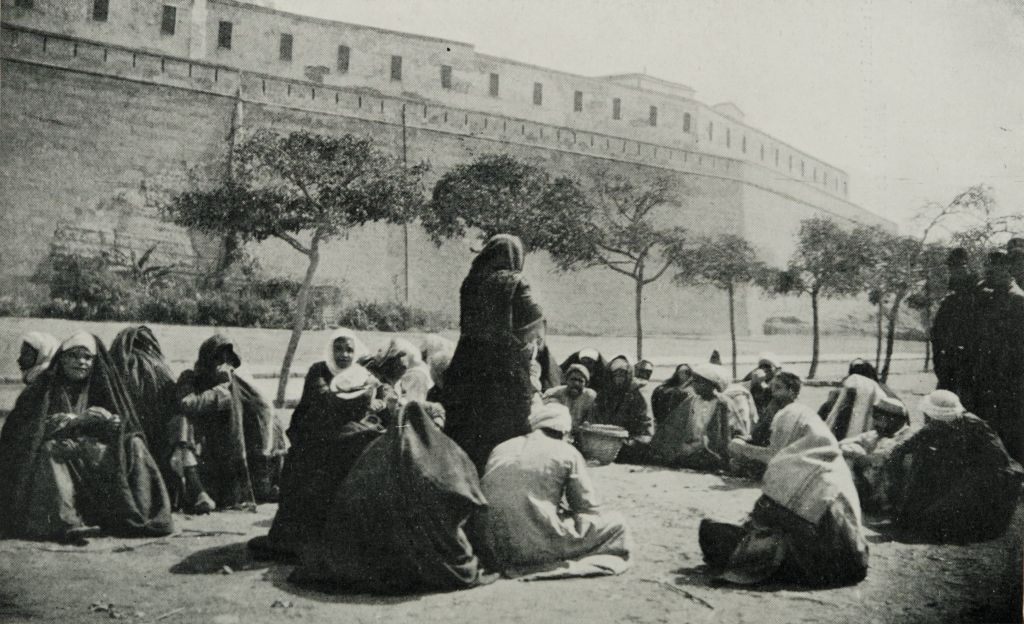
A Story-teller reciting from the One Thousand and One Nights – 1911

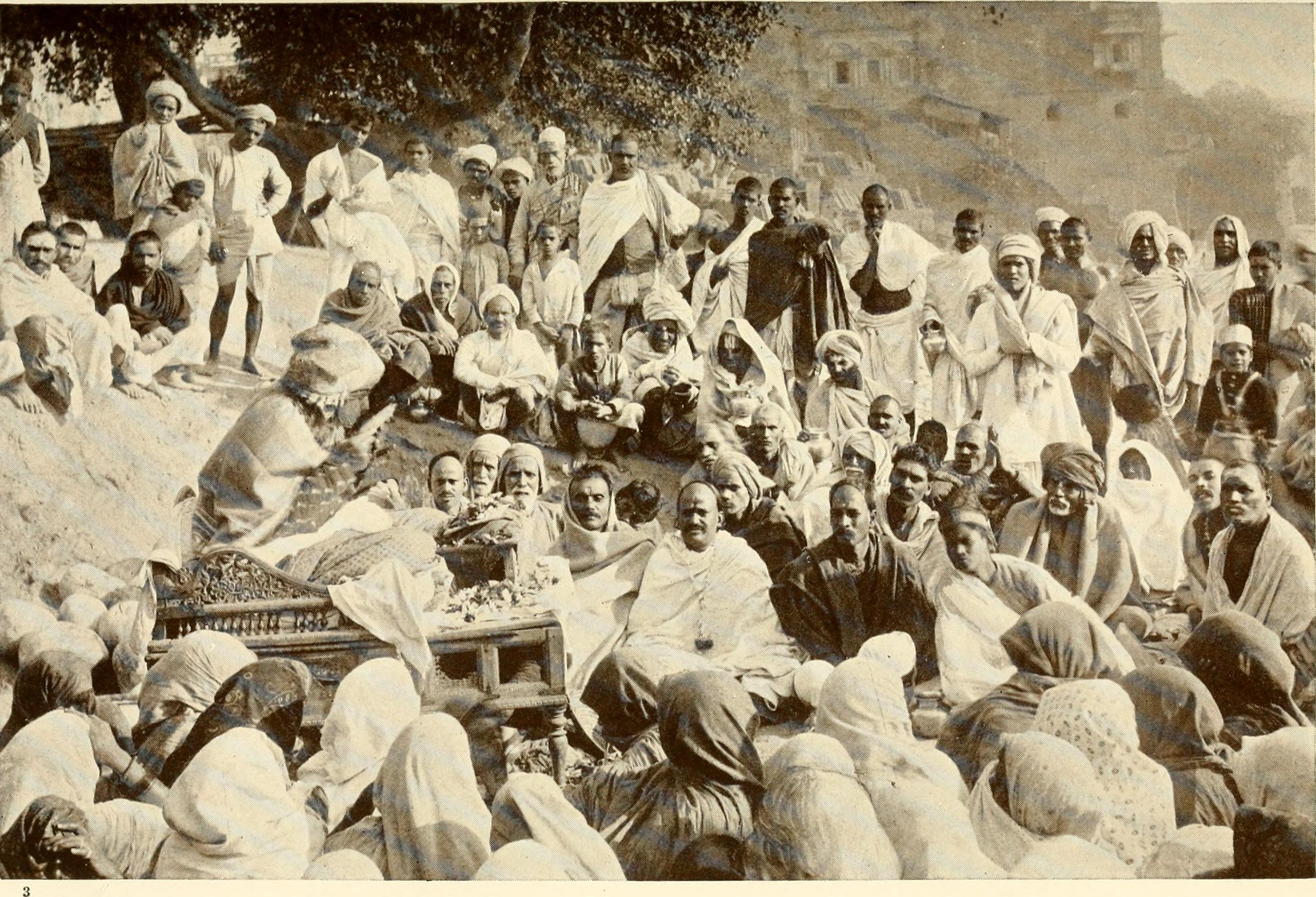
Vyasa (sitting on the high table), the common title for Indian oral storytellers, reciting epics among villagers, 1913

Oral storytelling is the human activity and tradition of intimate storytelling, dating back before ancient times, in which a speaker verbally relates a story to an audience in physically close proximity. Often, the participants are seated together in a circular fashion. The intimacy and connection are deepened by the flexibility of oral storytelling which allows the tale to be molded according to the needs of the audience and the location or environment of the telling. Listeners also experience the urgency of a creative process taking place in their presence and they experience the empowerment of being a part of that creative process. Storytelling creates a personal bond with the teller and the audience.

The flexibility of oral storytelling extends to the teller as well. Each teller will incorporate their personality and may choose to add characters to the story. As a result, there will be numerous variations of a single story. Some tellers consider anything outside the narrative as extraneous, while other storytellers choose to enhance their telling of the tale with the addition of visual and audio tools, specific actions, and creative strategies and devices.

Storytelling may be performed in many forms: in prose, in poetic form, as a song, accompanied with dance or some kind of theatrical performance, etc.

== Human need ==
It is likely that oral storytelling has existed as long as human language. Storytelling fulfills the need to cast personal experiences in narrative form. Storytelling is evident in ancient cultures such as the Australian Aboriginals. Community storytelling offered the security of explanation—how life and its many forms began and why things happen—as well as entertainment and enchantment. Communities were strengthened and maintained through stories that connected the present, the past, and the future.

Telling stories is a nurturing act for the listener, who is connected to the storyteller through the story, as well as for the storyteller, who is connected to the listeners through the story.

== History ==
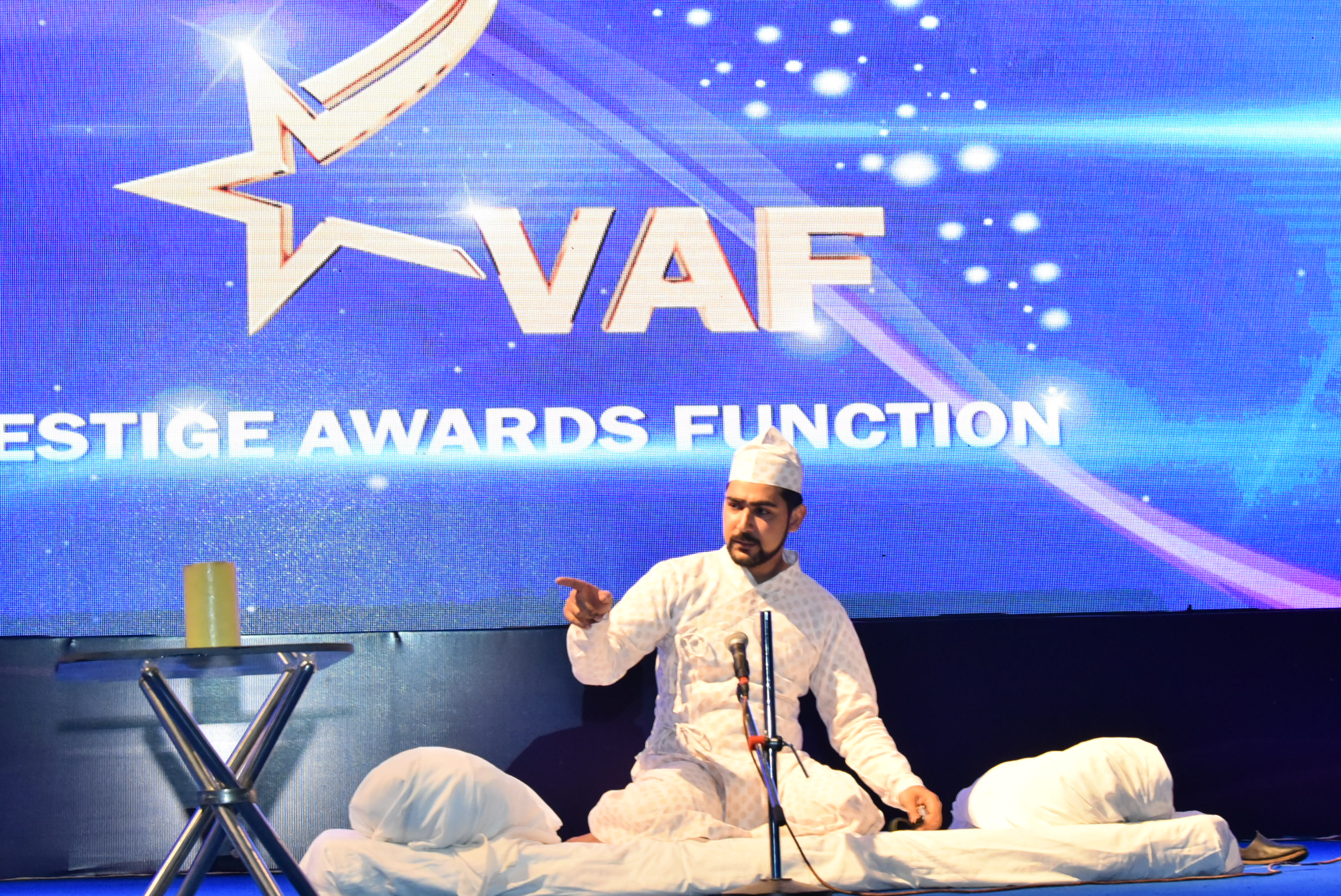
An Indian traditional oral storyteller Dastangoi artist reciting the "Dastan"

Early storytelling probably originated in simple chants. For example, people may have sung chants as they worked at grinding corn or sharpening tools. Our early ancestors created myths to explain natural occurrences. They assigned superhuman qualities to ordinary people, thus originating hero tales.

Early storytelling combined stories, poetry, music, and dance. Those who excelled at storytelling became entertainers, educators, cultural advisors, and historians for the community. Through storytellers, the history of a culture is handed down from generation to generation.

The importance of stories and storytellers throughout human history can be seen in the respect afforded to professional storytellers.

The 9th-century fictional storyteller Scheherazade of One Thousand and One Nights, who saved herself from execution by telling tales, is one example illustrating the value placed on storytelling in the past. Centuries before Scheherazade, the power of storytelling was reflected by Vyasa at the beginning of the Indian epic Mahabharata. Vyasa says, "If you listen carefully, at the end, you'll be someone else".

In the Middle Ages, storytellers, also called troubadours or minstrels, could be seen in marketplaces and were honored as members of royal courts. Medieval storytellers were expected to know the current tales and, in the words of American storyteller Ruth Sawyer, "to repeat all the noteworthy theses from the universities, to be well informed on court scandals, to know the healing power of herbs and simples (medicines), to be able to compose verses for a lord or lady at a moment's notice, and to play on at least two of the instruments then in favor at court." According to some writers, there were 426 minstrels employed at the wedding of Princess Margaret of England in 1290. Two of the storytellers in the court of King Edward I were two women who performed under the names of Matill Makejoye and Pearl in the Egg.

Journeying from land to land, storytellers would learn various regions' stories while also gathering news to bring back with them. Through exchanging stories with other storytellers, stories changed, making it difficult to trace the origins of many stories.

In the 1800s, Jakob and Wilhelm Grimm collected and published stories that had been told orally in Germany. They did not publish them as they found them, however, but edited them per their own values. Like the Grimm brothers in Germany, Peter Christen Asbjrnsen and Jorgen Moe collected Norwegian folk tales. In Denmark, Hans Christian Andersen adapted folktales he heard from oral storytellers. In England, Joseph Jacobs recorded collections of folktales from England, Scotland, and Wales.

In the 1900s, the importance of oral storytelling was recognized by storytellers such as Marie Shedlock, a retired English schoolteacher. She made several trips to the United States to lecture on the art of storytelling, emphasizing the importance of storytelling as a natural way to introduce literature to children.

== Professional storytellers in various cultures ==
- Ashik/ashough, in Turkic cultures
- Bard, Celtic cultures
- Pingshu, Chinese culture
- Dastangoi, India
- Qissagoi, Pakistan and India
- Al-Qaskhun, Iraqi culture
- Fili & Seanchaí, Ireland
- Goliard, Western Europe
- Griot, West Africa
- Gusans, of Parthia and Armenia of old times
- Kobzar, Ukraine
- Maggid, (Hebrew) Jewish
- Minstrel, Medieval Europe
- Dengbêj, Kurdish epic singer
- Ozan, term predating âşık ("ashik") in Turkic cultures
- Üligershin, Mongols, Buryats
- Hakawati, Arab culture

== Oral storytelling festivals ==
In the 20th century, oral storytelling has undergone a revival of interest and focus. Including the establishment of a number of storytelling festivals beginning with the National Storytelling Festival (USA) in Jonesborough, Tennessee.

Regional storytelling festivals bring tellers of a certain state or region together for entertaining, telling, and education in the art.

A Haryanvi folk story orated by Dada Zile Singh Malik Ji

== Films ==
- How People Got Fire – Animated film about oral storytelling in Native culture
