= Marie-Anne Detourbay =

French salon-holder

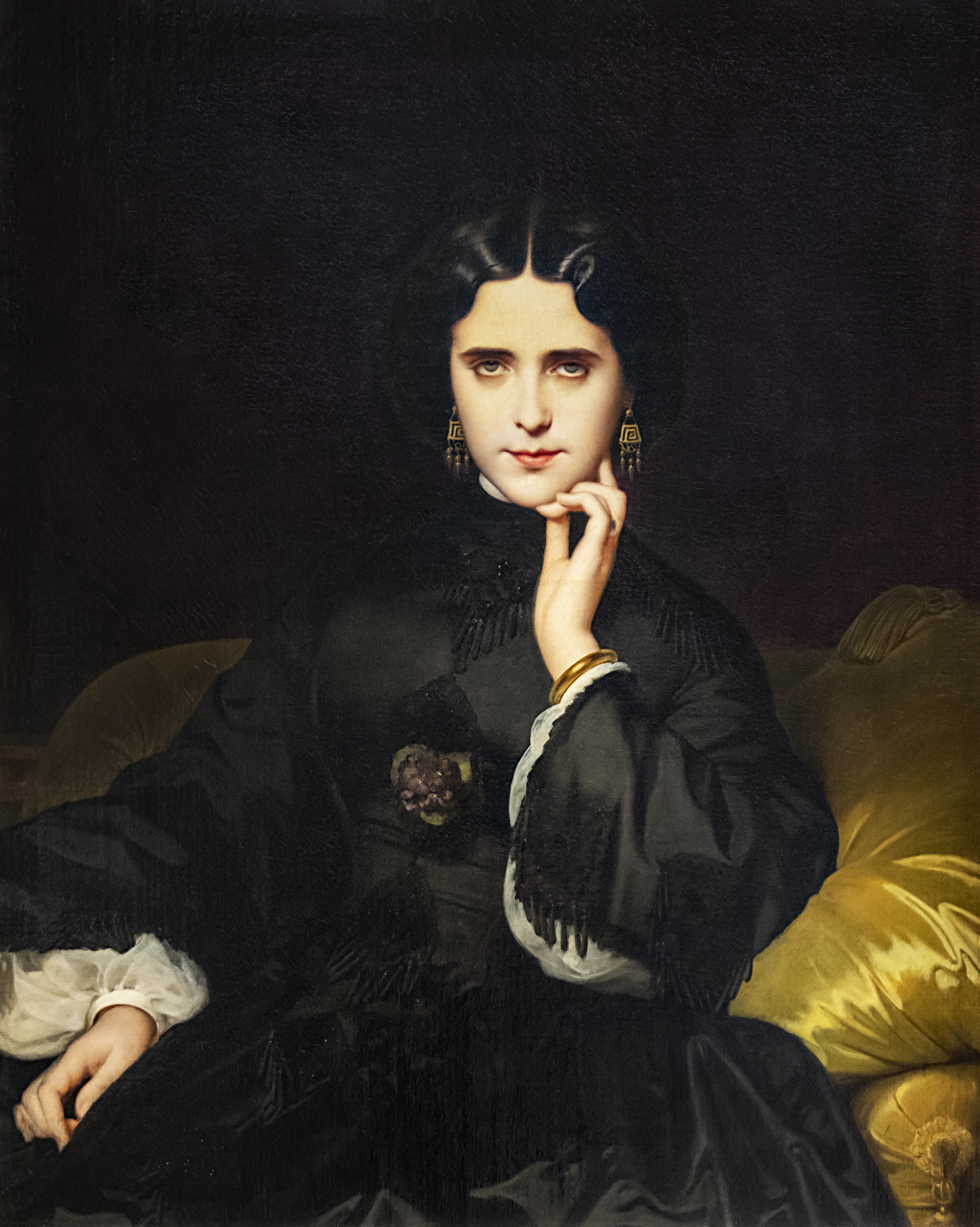
- Marie-Anne Detourbay (1862) by Amaury-Duval - Musée d'Orsay
- Born: 18 January 1837; Reims, France
- Died: 15 January 1908 (aged 70); Paris, French Third Republic
- Other name: Jeanne De Tourbey
- Occupations: Courtesan, salonnière
- Title: Comtesse de Loynes
- Spouse: Count Victor Edgar de Loynes (m. 1872)

Marie-Anne Detourbay (18 January 1837 – 15 January 1908) was a French demimondaine and salon hostess. She was a famous courtesan during the Second Empire, and also hosted a literary salon which had some influence during the Second Empire and the Third Republic. She is also known for her relationship with Jules Lemaître.

== Early life ==
Marie-Anne Detourbay, was born on rue Neuve (later rue Gambetta), Reims into a poor, large family. Her mother was a cloth burler and her father unknown. From age eight she was employed to rinse champagne bottles.

When Detourbey's mother married a man named Rixe, who was a carpenter, life became easier. Marie-Anne was able to pursue an education up to the age of 13 when Rixe died. Detourbey then resumed rinsing champagne bottles.

Marie-Anne took the first opportunity she could to leave Reims, which presented itself when a friend invited her to move to Paris together. In Paris, she assumed the name Jeanne de Tourbey and soon became part of the Parisian demimonde. She continued to use her mother's surname of Detourbey, but at times wrote it as "De Tourbay" or "Detourbay".

It was at this point that she had a documented exchange with Alexander Dumas fils:

Jeanne: "You know I have come to Paris to educate myself. I want to learn."

Dumas fils: "And why? For what need had so pretty a child of education?"

Jeanne: "Because one day Paris must be at my feet."

== Career as Courtesan and Salon Hostess ==
Early in her time in Paris, Detourbay met Marc Fournier, the director at the Théâtre de la Porte Saint-Martin. He launched her career as a courtesan and actress. Her career as an actress was short lived as she realized her strengths lie elsewhere. It was through her connections to Fournier and Dumas fils that she met other influential figures of the time. The publisher Arthur Meyer became close friends with Detourbey and soon coined her nickname "The Lady of the Violets."

Fournier also introduced her to Prince Napoleon, a cousin of Napoleon III. The Prince installed her in a beautiful flat in rue de l'Arcade, close to the Champs-Élysées. She would host a Salon attended by leading literary men: Ernest Renan, Sainte-Beuve, Théophile Gautier, Prévost-Paradol and Émile de Girardin.

Through her best friend, actress Josephine Clemence Ennery, nicknamed "Gisette"(fr), she met Gustave Flaubert and Khalil-Bey, who fell in love with her. From Tunis, where he went to write Salammbô, Flaubert wrote:

It is not to keep to my promise that I write to you, dear and beautiful neighbor, but because I think of you almost continually! And I have nothing to say to you, nothing else! I swear by your beautiful eyes and hands. [...] In eight days I'm leaving and in three weeks I'll see you again. This is the important thing. With what joy will I rush to your house, and how my heart will beat by pulling your bell! When I am at your feet, on your carpet, we will talk of my journey, if it amuses you. [...] If you knew how I think about your apartment, which contains you, and even the furniture that surrounds you! Have you not since my departure felt, sometimes, like a breath that passed over you? It was something of me, who escaping from my heart, traversing the space, invisibly, and reaching down there! I lived for five weeks with this memory (which is a desire too). Your image kept me company in loneliness, incessantly. I heard your voice through the sound of the waves and your charming face flutters around me, on the hedges of nopals, in the shade of the palm trees and in the horizon of the mountains. It seems to me that I took away from your dear person a kind of emanation which penetrates me, a fragrance of which I am embalmed, which makes me drunk and intoxicates me. I blame you for occupying so much space in my thoughts. When I want to dream of Carthage, it is the rue de Vendome that represents itself.

Around 1862, she met Ernest Baroche (fr), the son of senior ministerial civil servant Jules Baroche, who also fell in love with her. Ernest himself had been made another Minister of Napoleon III, Master of Petitions on the State Council and Director of Foreign Trade at the Ministry of Agriculture. Detourbay and Baroche would have become engaged but, as Commander of the 12th mobile battalion of the Seine, he was killed in action at the Battle of Le Bourget on 30 October 1870. He left her a fortune of 800,000 gold francs (about 2.5 million Euros) and a sugar factory. The director of the factory was retired officer Count Victor Edgar de Loynes.

== As Countess de Loynes ==
In 1872, she married Count de Loynes. This marriage gave her access to high society, but the Count soon left for America, where he disappeared. Although the marriage was only nominal, she carried and kept the use of the name and title of Countess de Loynes. Her visitors became more prestigious; she received every day between five and seven o'clock. The celebrities of the Second Empire give way to those of the nascent Third Republic. Her visitors included Georges Clemenceau, Georges de Porto-Riche, Alexandre Dumas fils, Ernest Daudet, Henry Houssaye, Pierre Decourcelle, and soon many young writers and musicians led by Maurice Barrès. Barrès gave her his two books Huit jours chez M. Renan (1890) and Du sang, de la volupté, et de la mort (1894) luxuriously bound by Charles Meunier in 1897. Other visitors included Paul Bourget, Marcel Proust, Georges Bizet and Henri Kowalski.

Between 1880 and 1885, through Arsène Houssaye, she met the critic Jules Lemaître, who was 15 years younger than her. Lemaître founded the Ligue de la patrie française in 1899 and became its first president. As monarchists, they put their political hopes in General Boulanger and became passionate anti-Dreyfusards. This led to a break with some of her friends including Clemenceau, de Porto-Riche and Anatole France. From then on she received into her home Édouard Drumont, Jules Guérin and Henri Rochefort.

In her latter years she supported the political hopes of Charles Maurras, and shortly before her death on 15th January 1908, Detourbay helped Maurras and Léon Daudet found the Royalist newspaper L'Action française by donating 100,000 gold francs.

The Countess of Loynes was buried in Montmartre Cemetery, alongside her parents.

== Residences ==
=== Reims ===
- 58, rue neuve, (now rue Gambetta), from her birth in 1837
- 16, rue du Cadran-Saint-Pierre (in 1852);
- 8, rue de la Grosse-Écritoire (in 1854, middle-class pension).

=== Paris ===
- Place Royale (Place des Vosges);
- Rue de Vendôme (in 1857);
- 28, rue de l'Arcade (8th arrondissement) (in 1865);
- 53, avenue d'Iéna (in 1886);
- 152, avenue des Champs-Elysées (8th arrondissement) (from 1896).

== Bibliography ==
- Baldick, Robert (1971). Dinner at Magny's. Gollancz.
- Gallimard, ed. (1980). "Lettre à Jeanne de Tourbey du 15 mai 1858". Flaubert : Correspondance, tome 2 Juillet 1851 - Décembre 1858 (in French). Bibliothèque de la Pléiade.
- Goncourt, Edmond de; Goncourt, Jules de (1971). Becker, George Joseph; Philips, Edith (eds.). Paris and the Arts, 1851-1896: From the Goncourt Journal. Cornell University Press. ISBN 9780801406553. "Marie-Anne Detourbay."
- Holden, Wilfred Herbert (1950). The Pearl from Plymouth: Eliza Emma Crouch, alias Cora Pearl, with notes on some of her celebrated contemporaries. British Technical and General Press.
- Picard Tajan Ader (1986). Tres beaux livres des xixe et xxe siècles - Manuscrits - Vente à Paris, Hotel Drouot - 4 Juin 1986.
