= Goncourt, Haute-Marne =

Goncourt
- Part of Bourmont-entre-Meuse-et-Mouzon
- Location of Goncourt
- Location within France Location within Grand Est
- Coordinates: 48°14′28″N 5°36′30″E
- Country: France
- Region: Grand Est
- Department: Haute-Marne
- Arrondissement: Chaumont
- Canton: Poissons
- Commune: Bourmont-entre-Meuse-et-Mouzon
- Area^{1}: 18.77 km^{2} (7.25 sq mi)
- Elevation: 350 m (1,150 ft)
- Population (2022): 218
  - Density: 11.6/km^{2} (30.1/sq mi)
- Time zone: UTC+01:00 (CET)
  - Summer (DST): UTC+02:00 (CEST)
- Postal code: 52150
- ^{1} French Land Register data, which excludes lakes, ponds, glaciers > 1 km^{2} (0.386 sq mi or 247 acres) and river estuaries.

Goncourt (French pronunciation: [ɡɔ̃kuʁ]) is a former commune in the Haute-Marne department in north-eastern France. On 1 January 2019, it was merged into the commune Bourmont-entre-Meuse-et-Mouzon.

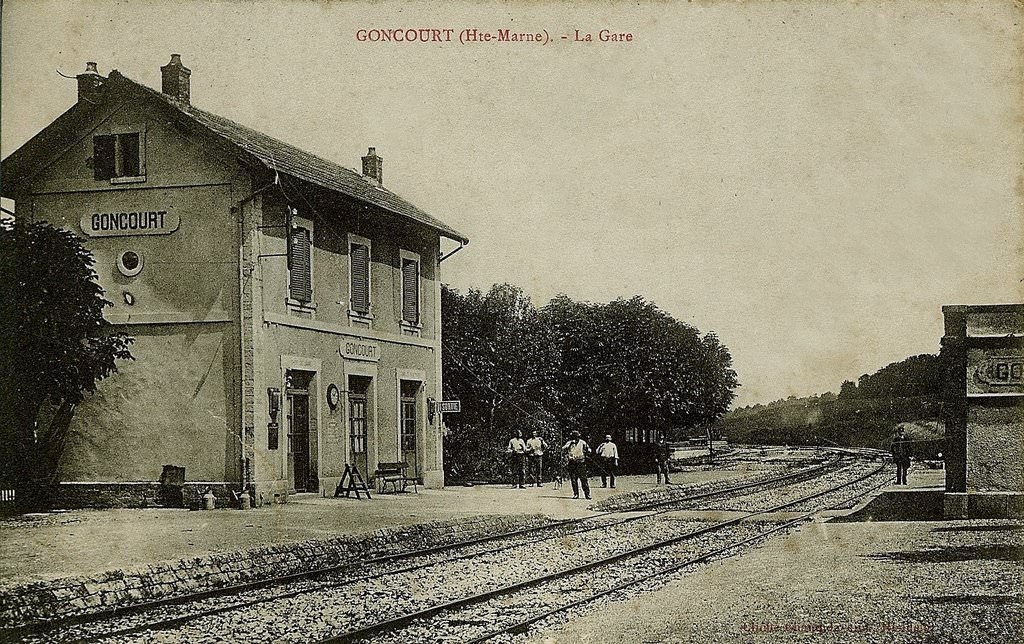
Goncourt rail station (postcard)

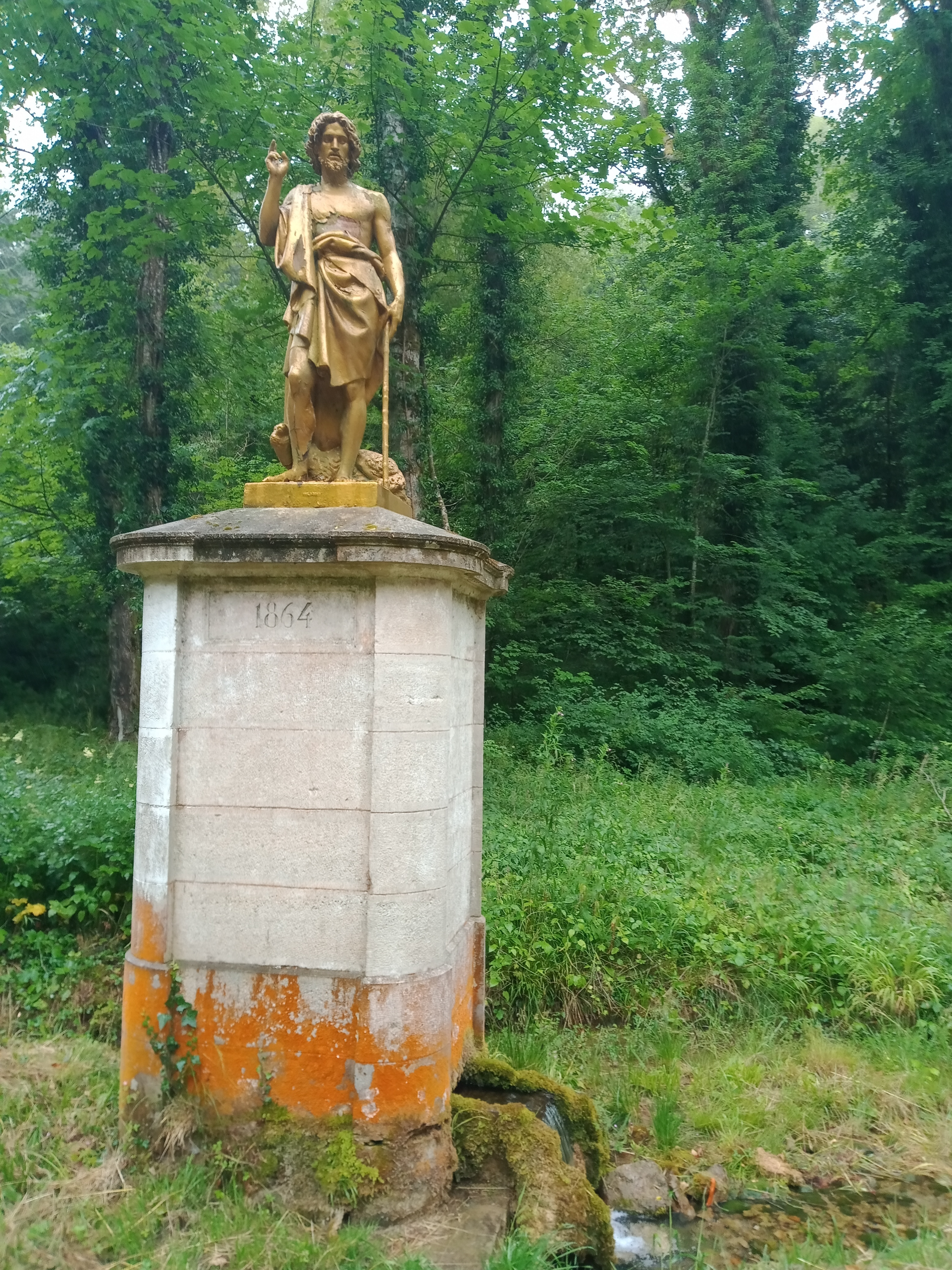
Saint Jean spring

== See also ==
- Communes of the Haute-Marne department
