= Paul Bins, comte de Saint-Victor =

French author and critic

Paul de Saint-Victor
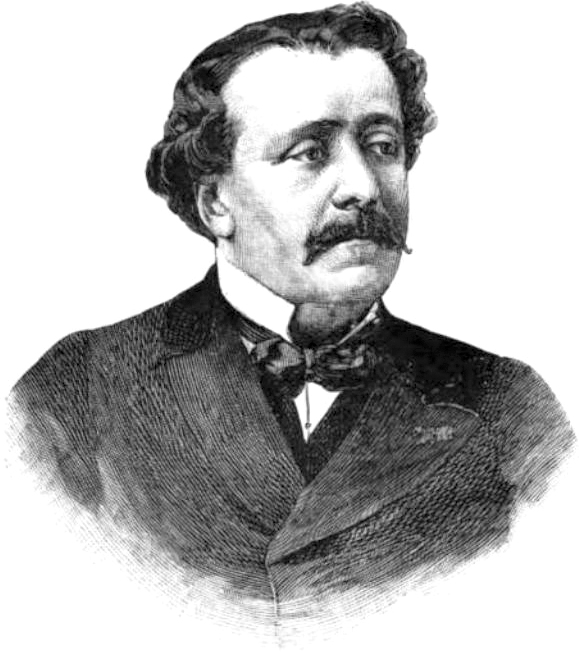
- Born: Paul-Jacques-Raymond Bins de Saint-Victor; 11 July 1827; Paris, France
- Died: 9 July 1881 (aged 53); Paris, France
- Occupation: Essayist
- Writing career
- Language: French

Paul Bins, comte de Saint-Victor (11 July 1827 in Paris – 9 July 1881 in Paris), known as Paul de Saint-Victor, a French author and critic. He is likely most known today as a French cultural figure mentioned by Marcel Proust in the novel In Search of Lost Time.

== Personal ==
Saint-Victor was born in Paris. His father Jacques Bins, comte de Saint-Victor (1772–1858), is chiefly remembered for his poem L'Espérance, and for an excellent verse translation of Anacreon.

He had an affair with Lia Félix, a sister of the famous actress Rachel Félix. They had a girl, Claire, on 26 October 1860, whose godfather was Edmond de Goncourt.

Saint-Victor died in Paris on 9 July 1881.

== Career ==
Saint-Victor ceased using his title as he found it out of keeping with his democratic principles. He began as a drama critic on the Pays newspaper in 1851, and in 1855 he succeeded Théophile Gautier on the Presse. In 1866 he migrated to the Liberté, and in 1869 joined the staff of the Moniteur universel. In 1870, during the last days of the Second Empire, he was made inspector-general of fine arts.

Almost all of Saint-Victor's work consists of articles, the best known being the collection entitled Hommes et Dieux (1867). His death interrupted the publication of Les Deux Masques, in which he intended to survey the whole of ancient and modern dramatic literature. Saint-Victor's critical faculty was considerable, though rather one-sided. He owed a good deal to Théophile Gautier, but his writing was more florid than Gautier's.
