= Alison Fairlie =

Alison Anna Bowie Fairlie
- Born: 23 May 1917; Lerwick
- Died: 21 February 1993 (aged 75); Cambridge

Professor Alison Fairlie FBA (23 May 1917 – 21 February 1993) was a British scholar of French literature. She was a long time fellow of Girton College, Cambridge.

== Life ==
Alison Anna Bowie Fairlie was born in Lerwick on the island of Shetland. Her father had been the Presbyterian minister in Lerwick but he died when she was young. Fairlie went to St Hugh's College in Oxford in 1935 and left with a first class degree in Modern and Medieval Languages.

The occupation of France interfered with what might have been her base for post doctoral work. She had returned to work in Paris until it fell to the advancing German armies in 1940. Fairlie made her way to Bordeaux where she saw many diplomats abandoning their expensive cars. She did not have diplomatic credentials but they managed to persuade a Dutch grain ship to take them to England. By the time she obtained her Doctorate of Philosophy in 1943, Fairlie had been recruited to work at Bletchley Park which was Britain's centre for deciphering intercepted German wartime messages. She was employed as an assistant of the Foreign Office, but she was assigned to work in a section led by Vivienne Alford. The work involved trying to understand unusual phrases discovered in messages. These phrases may have been associated with technical descriptions and Fairlie had to quickly extend her knowledge to matters outside literature and history. Leonard Wilson Forster who worked at Bletchley described how Fairlie's research techniques which she had used for her doctorate were strangely still relevant as they tried to understand the German, Italian and Japanese technical jargon. The group was said to be inspired by the polymath Geoffrey Tandy.

Her first book was titled Leconte de Lisle's Poems on the Barbarian Races and it was published in 1947. This book was an edited version of her doctoral thesis. Fairlie died in Cambridge in 1993.
