= Claudius Popelin =

French painter, enameler, poet, and translator (1825 – 1892)

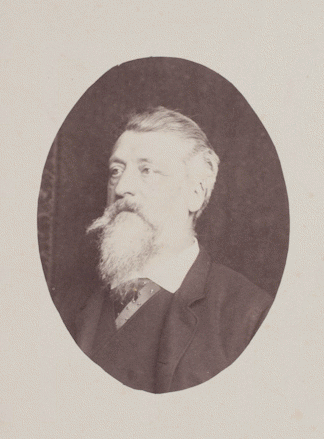
- Gustave Popelin, Portrait de Claudius Popelin (circa 1890), Paris, Musée d'Orsay.
- Born: November 2, 1825; Paris, France
- Died: May 17, 1892 (aged 66); Paris, France
- Education: François-Édouard Picot, Ary Scheffer
- Known for: Painter, enameler, poet, translator
- Spouse: Marie Thérèse Anquetil (m. 1858; her death 1869)
- Partner: Mathilde Bonaparte (rumored)
- Awards: Legion of Honour

Claudius Popelin, also known as Claudius Popelin-Ducarre (2 November 1825 – 17 May 1892) was a French painter, enameler, poet, and translator.

== Biography ==
Studying under François-Édouard Picot and Ary Scheffer, Claudius Marcel Popelin was known for his historical paintings, portraits, and enamels.

On 15 April 1858, he married Marie Thérèse Anquetil (1836–1869) in the 8th arrondissement of Paris. They had one child, Gustave Popelin (1859–1937), an artist who won the Grand Prix de Rome. Popelin dedicated two works to his son: his translation of Hypnerotomachia Poliphili and his collection of poems.

Popelin is famous for his pioneering work translating, annotating, and commenting on the Hypnerotomachia Poliphili (originally printed in 1499). His Le Songe de Poliphile was published in French in 1883 by Isidore Liseux.

== Publications ==
=== Books ===
- Popelin, Claudius (1866). L'émail des peintres (in French). A. Lévy.
- L'Art de l'émail, lecture given at the Union centrale des beaux-arts, 6 March 1868.
- Popelin, Claudius (1869). Les Vieux Arts du Feu (in French). A. Lemerre.

=== Poetry ===
- Sonnets et eaux-fortes, a poem and an etching, 1869
- Un cent de strophes à Pailleron, 1881.
- Histoire d'avant-hier, poem, 1886.
- Un livre de sonnets, 1888.
- Poésies complètes : Strophes et couplets. Hommes et fourmis. Histoire d'avant-hier. Un livre de sonnets, 1889.

=== Translations ===
- Les Troys Libvres de l'art du potier, esquels se traicte non seulement de la practique, mais briefvement de tous les secretz de ceste chouse, du cav. Cipriano Piccolpasso, 1860.
- De la Statue et de la Peinture, treatises by Leon Battista Alberti, translated from Latin to French by Claudius Popelin, 1868.
- Le Songe de Poliphile, ou Hypnérotomachie by Brother Francesco Colonna, literally translated for the first time, with an introduction and notes, by Claudius Popelin, 2 vol., 1883, Prix Langlois from the Académie française in 1884.

== Distinctions ==
- Knight of the Legion of Honour.

== Gallery ==
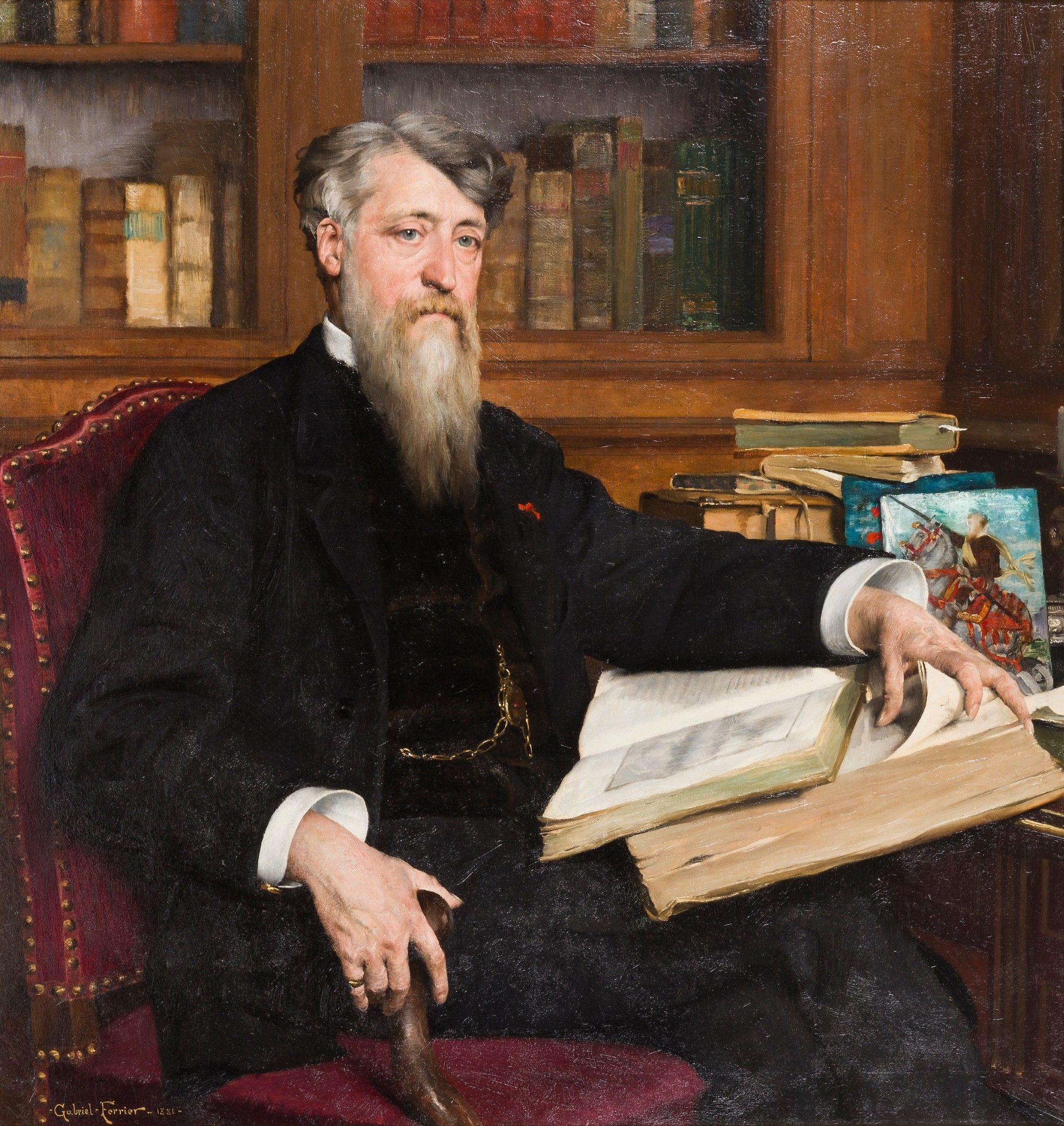
Gabriel Ferrier, Portrait of Claudius Popelin, 1881, Paris, Musée des Arts Décoratifs

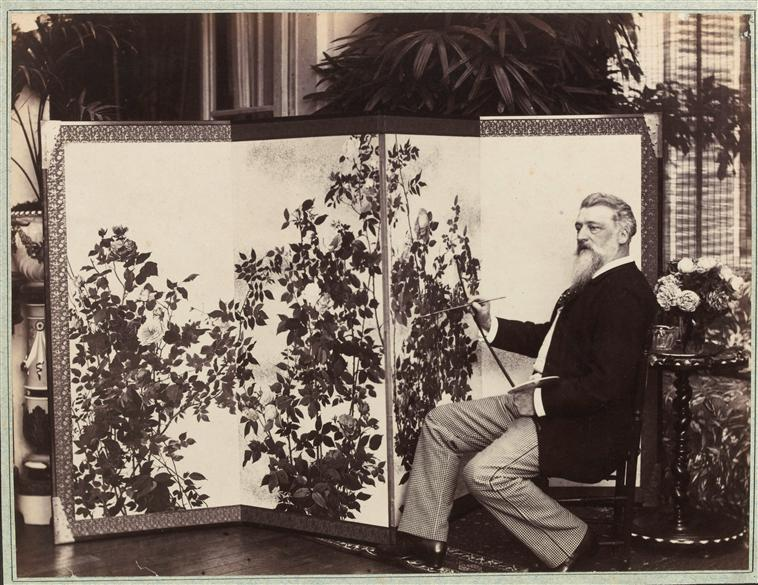
Gustave Popelin, Claudius Popelin-Ducarre, seated, painting, photograph, Paris, Musée d'Orsay.

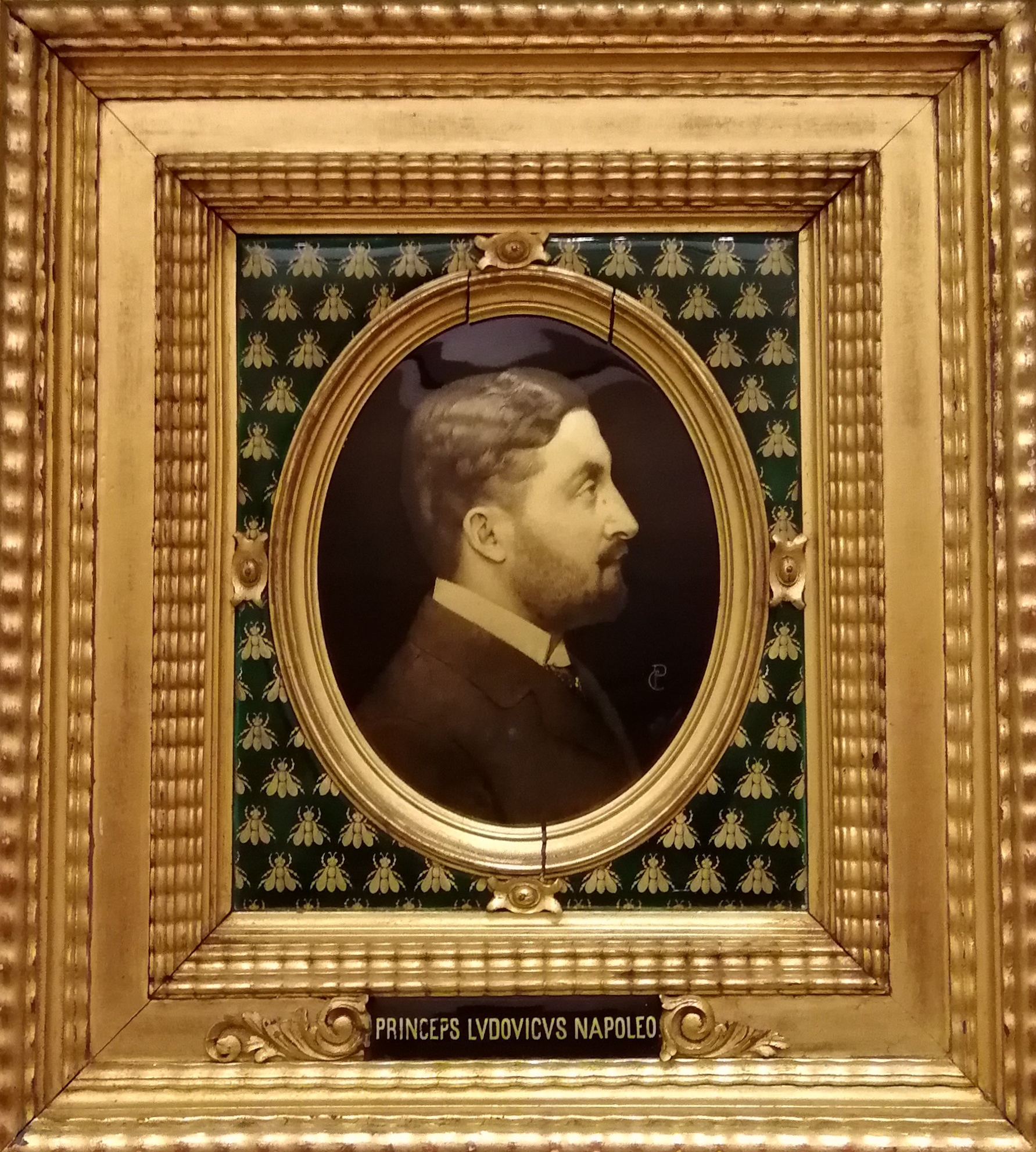
Portrait of Prince Louis Bonaparte (1890), painted enamel in gold cameo on copper, Paris, Musée d'Orsay.

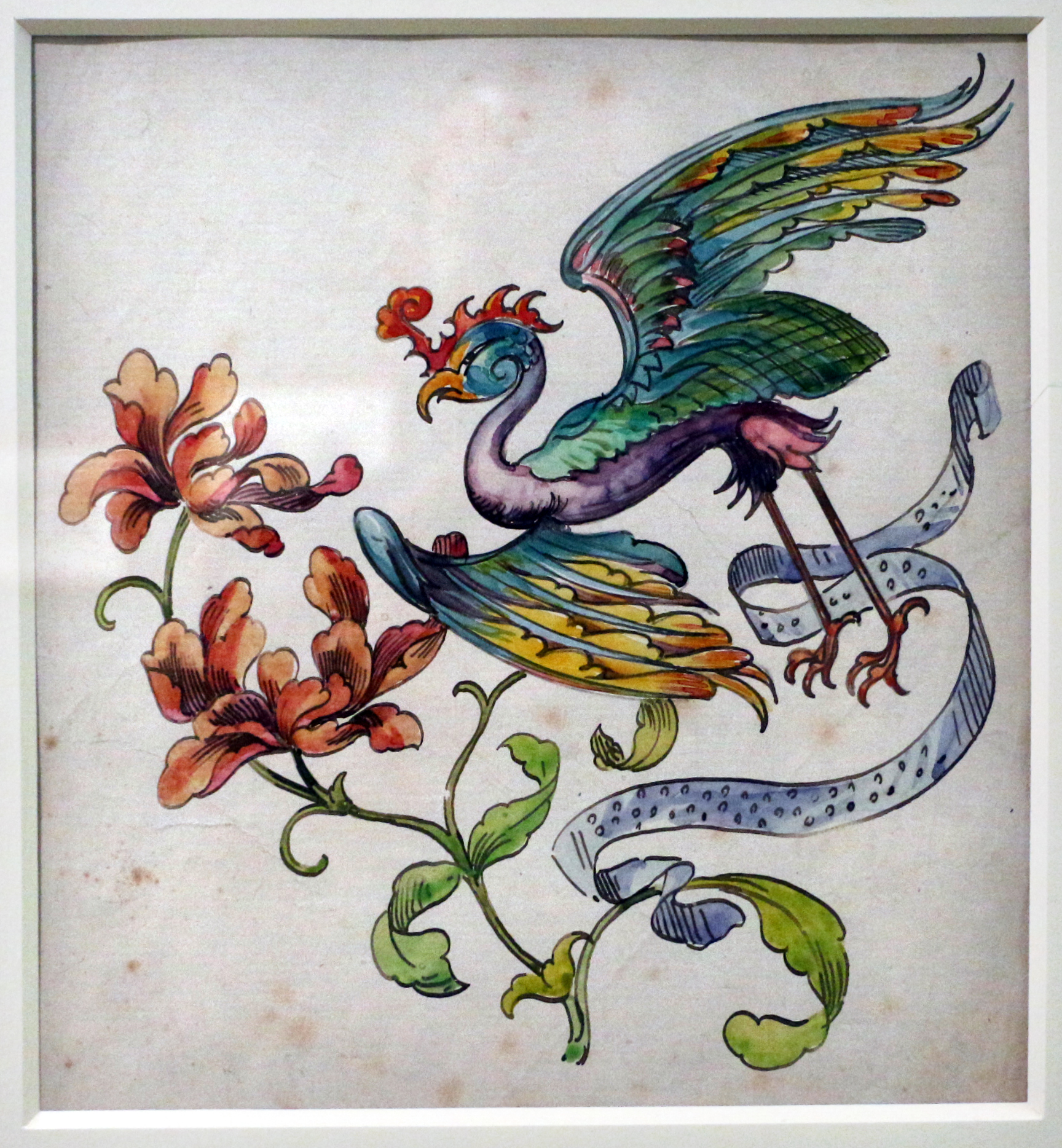
Study of flowery wreath and fantastic bird, letter paper with a letterhead of a baron's crown? (between 1870 and 1880), watercolor, Paris, Musée d'Orsay.

== Bibliography ==
- Falize, Lucien (1893). Claudius Popelin et la renaissance des émaux peints (in French). Gazette des Beaux-Arts
- Bouchaud, Pierre de (1894). Claudius Popelin: peintre, émailleur et poète (in French). A. Lemerre.
- Popelin, Claudius (1875). Cinq octaves de sonnets (in French). A. Lemerre.
