= Germinie Lacerteux =

Book by Edmond de Goncourt

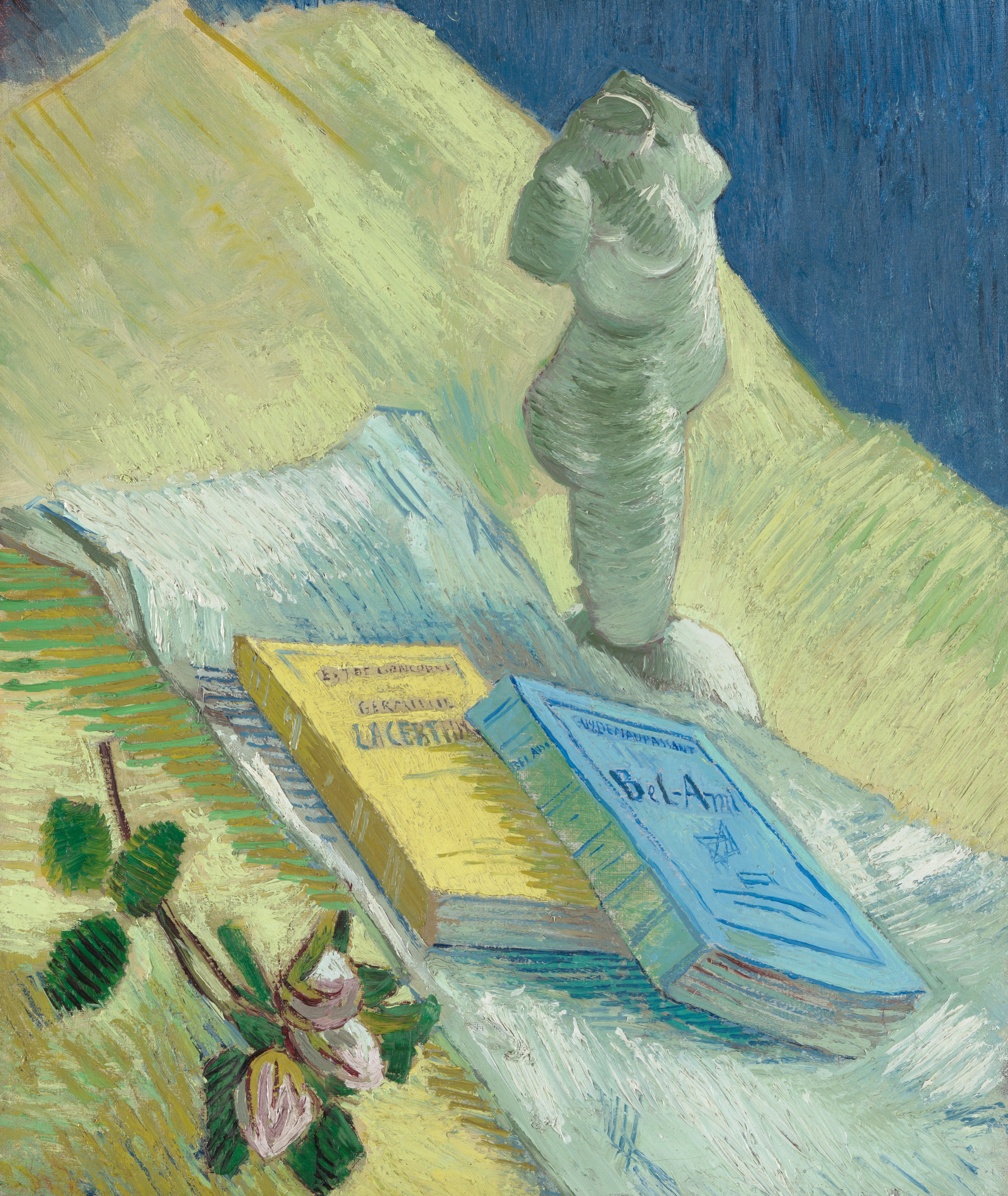
An 1887 painting by Vincent van Gogh features the book (yellow cover).

Germinie Lacerteux (1865) is a grim, anti-Romantic novel by Edmond and Jules de Goncourt in which the authors aim to present, as they say, a "clinic of love". It is the fourth of six novels they wrote.

The story is that of a poor country girl who comes to Paris, where her temperament renders her peculiarly liable to temptation. She succumbs to nymphomania, which finally brings her to death on a hospital cot. The study is based on limited observation by the authors of their own maidservant, Rose Malingre, whose double life they had never suspected. It was dramatized by Edmond de Goncourt and produced at the Odéon in 1889.
