= Edmond de Goncourt =

French writer and critic (1822–1896)

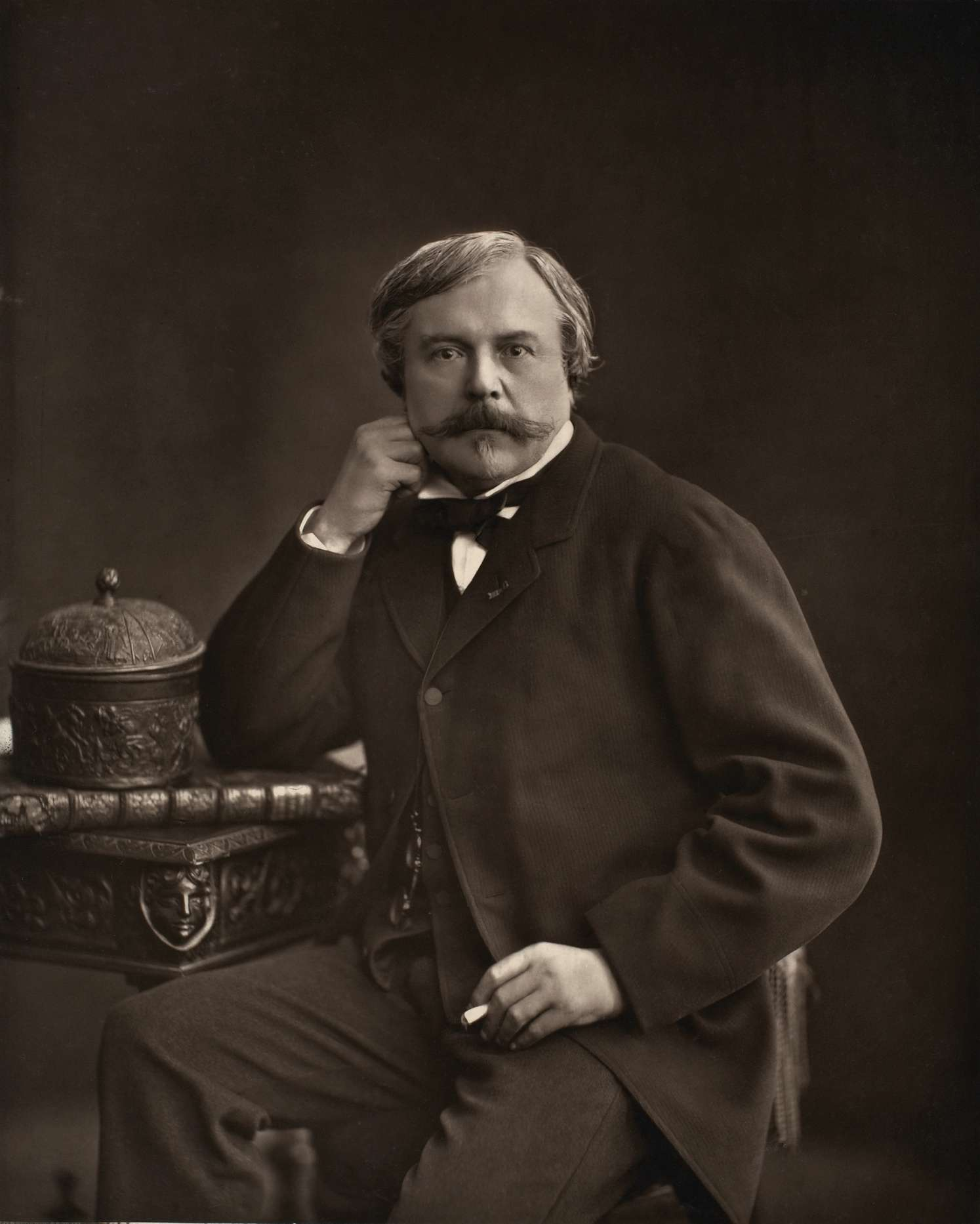
- Portrait by Nadar, c. 1877
- Born: 26 May 1822; Nancy, France
- Died: 16 July 1896 (aged 74); Draveil, France
- Resting place: Cimetière de Montmartre
- Occupations: Writer; literary critic; art critic; book publisher

Signature
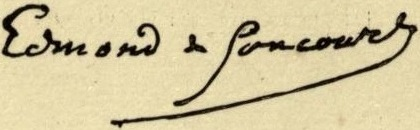

Edmond Louis Antoine Huot de Goncourt (pronounced [ɛdmɔ̃ d(ə) ɡɔ̃kuʁ]; 26 May 1822 – 16 July 1896) was a French writer, literary critic, art critic, book publisher and the founder of the Académie Goncourt.

== Biography ==
Goncourt was born in Nancy. His parents, Marc-Pierre Huot de Goncourt and Annette-Cécile de Goncourt (née Guérin), were minor aristocrats who died when he and his brother Jules de Goncourt were young adults. His father was a former cavalry officer and squadron commander in the Grande Armée of Napoleon I, and his grandfather Jean-Antoine Huot de Goncourt had been a deputy in the National Assembly of 1789. Edmond attended the pension Goubaux, the Lycée Henri IV, and the Lycée Condorcet. At the Lycée Condorcet, he studied rhetoric and philosophy from 1840 to 1842, followed by the study of law between 1842 and 1844.

After their mother's death in 1848, the brothers inherited an income which enabled them to live independently and pursue their artistic interests. Edmond was able to leave a treasury clerkship that had made him so miserable as to contemplate suicide. For much of his life, he collaborated with Jules creating works of art criticism, a notorious journal, and subsequently several novels. Their most notable novel was Germinie Lacerteux (1865), inspired by the exploits of the brothers' housekeeper Rose, who stole from them to fund a double life of orgies and sexual encounters. It is considered one of the earliest works of French Realism to deal with the working class.

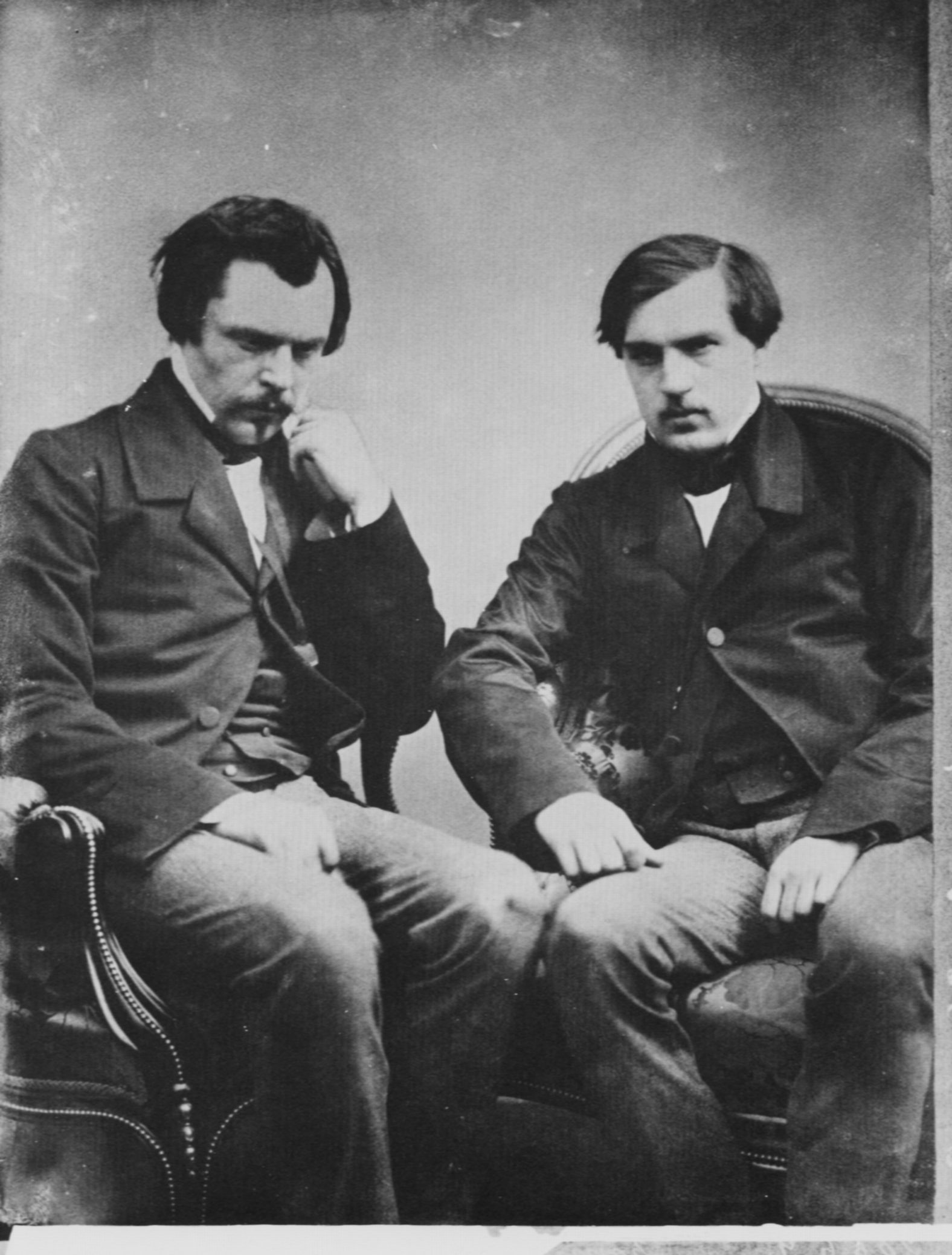
Nadar – Edmond and Jules de Goncourt (1822–1896 and 1830–1870) c. 1855

In 1852, Edmond and his brother were indicted for an "outrage against public morality" after they quoted erotic Renaissance poetry in an article. They were ultimately acquitted.

Edmond was known to be fascinated with Rococo and Japanese art. He also collected rare books. The brothers' house at Auteuil, which they purchased in 1868, was a showcase for their collection of 18th century French and Far Eastern art. Edmond documented the house and its interiors in his 1881 book La Maison d'un Artiste. Between 1856 and 1875, the brothers published essays on 18th century art in a collected series called L'Art du XVIIIe siècle, which revived appreciation for the Rococo.

After the death of Jules in 1870, Edmond continued to write novels alone. He also continued writing the Journal des Goncourt, which he and Jules had begun in 1851, only stopping 12 days before his death in 1896. He completed unfinished works from his collaboration with his brother, including a monograph on Paul Gavarni (1873) and a book called L'Amour au XVIIIe Siècle (1875). He revised, enlarged and reissued Les Maîtresses de Louis XV (1860) in three volumes between 1878 and 1879: La du Barry, Madame de Pompadour, and La Duchesse de Châteauroux et ses soeurs. His last novel, Chérie (1884), about a young woman who expresses her artistic sensibility in fashion, can be read as an exploration of impressionistic art. He collected the letters of his late brother in 1885, and between 1887 and 1896 issued nine volumes of the Journal. Edmond became increasingly jealous of more successful writers like Guy de Maupassant and Émile Zola, which is reflected in scathing entries in the Journal. In 1893 he wrote of Maupassant that his "success with loose society women is an indication of their vulgarity, for never have I seen a man of the world with such a red face, such common features, or such a peasant build."

He bequeathed his entire estate for the foundation and maintenance of the Académie Goncourt. In honour of his brother Jules, the Académie has awarded the Prix Goncourt every December since 1903. It is the most prestigious prize in French literature, given to "the best imaginary prose work of the year".

Edmond de Goncourt died in Champrosay in 1896 and was interred in the Cimetière de Montmartre in Paris.

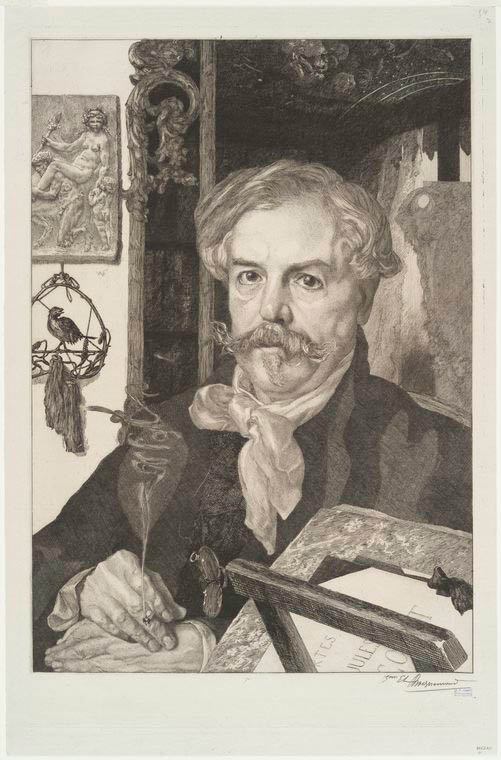
Etching on parchment portrait of Goncourt by Félix Bracquemond (1882)

== Works ==
(by Edmond alone)

Nonfiction

- Catalogue raisonné de l'oeuvre peint, dessiné et gravé d'Antoine Watteau (1875)
- Catalogue raisonné de l'œuvre peint, dessiné et gravé de P. P. Prud'hon (1876)
- La Maison d'un Artiste (1881)
- La Saint-Huberty (1884)
- L'Art japonais du XVIIIe siècle, Outamaro. Le peintre des maisons vertes (1891)
- La Guimard, d'après les registres des Menus Plaisirs, de la bibliothèque de l'Opéra, etc. (1893
- L'Art japonais du XVIIIe siècle, Hokousai (1896)
- Le Grenier (1896)
- Goncourt Journal

Novels

- La Fille Elisa (1877)
- Les Frères Zemganno (1878)
- La Faustin (1882)
- Chérie (1884)

== Honors and awards ==
Officer of the Order of Legion of Honour
