= La Bonne Chanson =

La Bonne Chanson may refer to:

- La Bonne Chanson (publishing company), a Canadian publishing company and independent record label
- La Bonne Chanson (poetry collection), of 1869-1870 by French poet Paul Verlaine
- La Bonne Chanson (Fauré), a song cycle composed 1892–94 by Gabriel Fauré to texts by Paul Verlaine
