= Henry Monnier =

French playwright, caricaturist and actor

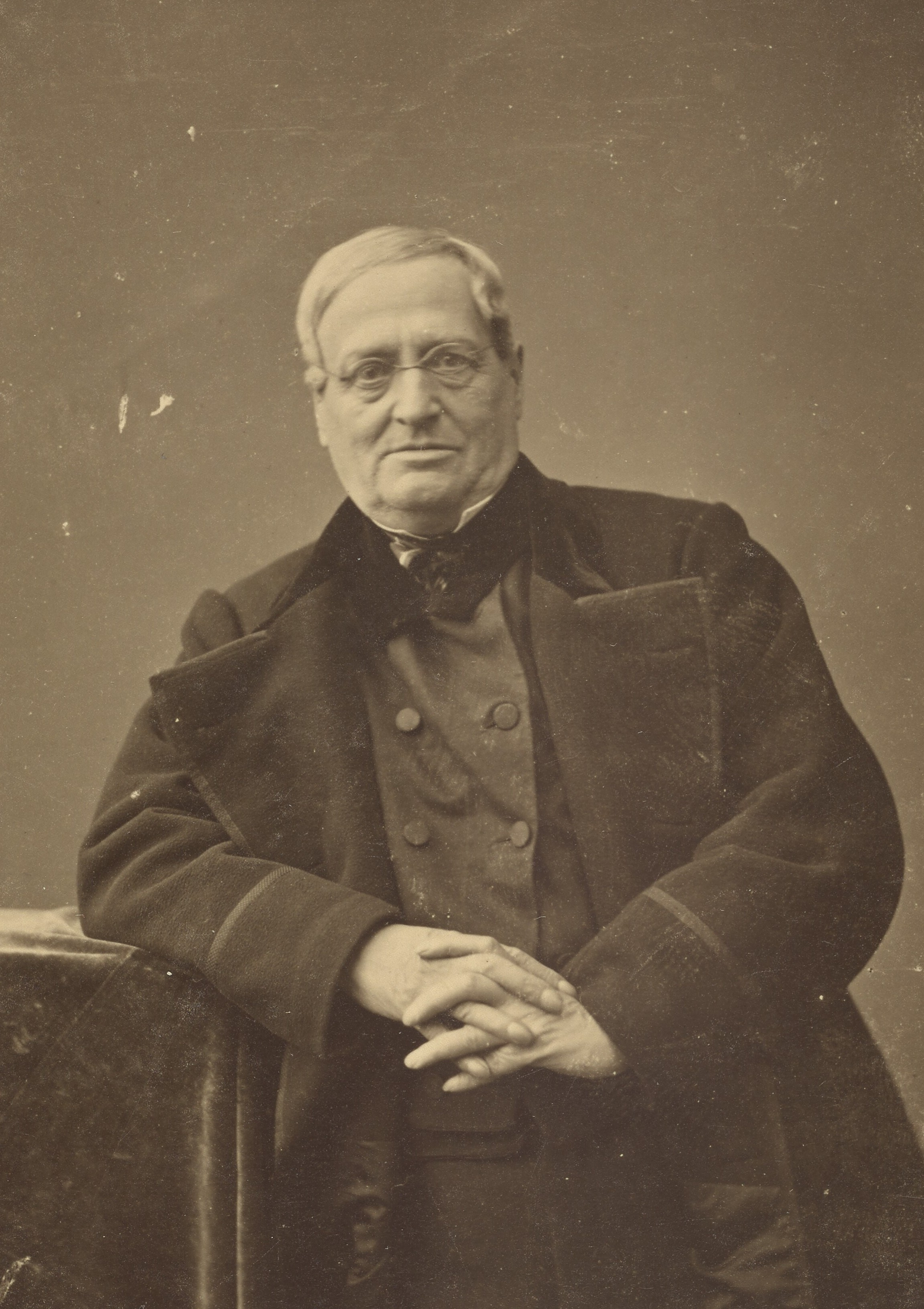
Photograph of Monnier by Nadar, c. 1861 – 1869

Henry-Bonaventure Monnier (7 June 1799 in Paris – 3 January 1877) was a French playwright, caricaturist and actor.

== Life ==
After studying at the Lycée Bonaparte, he frequented the workshops of Anne-Louis Girodet-Trioson and Antoine-Jean Gros. He positioned himself in London in 1822 and returned to France 5 years later. His meetings with Alexandre Dumas, Théophile Gautier, Stendhal, Eugène Sue, Prosper Mérimée, Eugène Scribe, Eugène Delacroix, Louis Boulanger and Honoré de Balzac opened doors to him.

Between 1827 and 1832, he produced several albums of lithographs, satirising the mores and physiognomies of his contemporaries and of the "grisettes" (or young working girls) in his office. He created the character Monsieur Prudhomme, of whom Balzac said was the "illustration of the type of the Parisian middle-class" and who inspired the poem of that title in Paul Verlaine's Poèmes saturniens.

On 21 May 1834, Monnier married Caroline Péguchet (known as Caroline Linsel, an actress at the Théâtre de la Monnaie) in Brussels.

From the 1850s onwards, he essentially devoted himself to writing and theatre.

He was the author of the famous phrase - On devrait construire les villes à la campagne, l’air y est tellement plus pur ! - that is usually attributed to Alphonse Allais.

In 1931 Sacha Guitry created a play freely inspired by Monnier's life, entitled Monsieur Prudhomme a-t-il vécu ?.

== Principal works ==
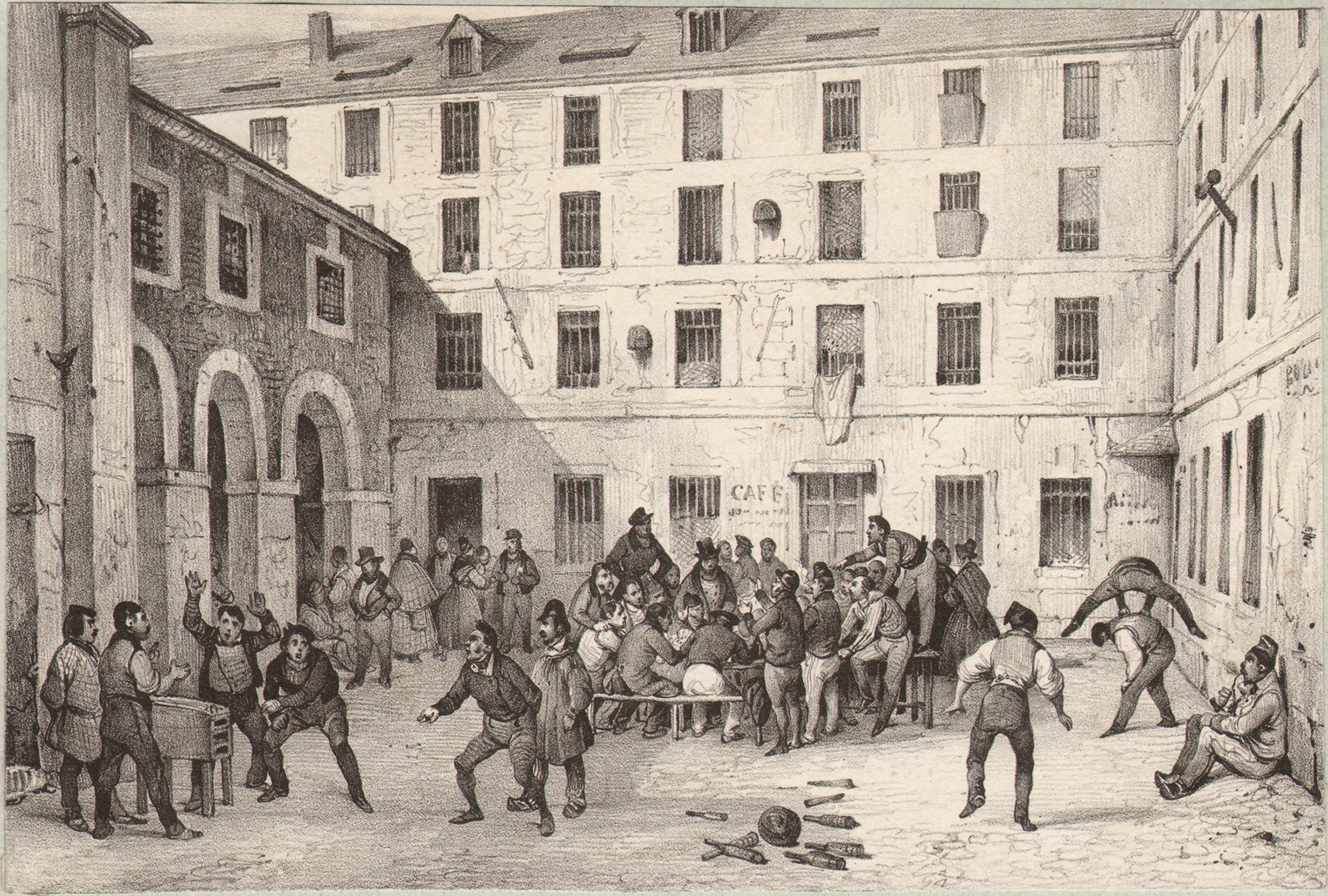
Games Lithography, 1830

=== Collections of drawings and caricatures ===
- Scènes populaires dessinées à la plume, 2 vol. (1830)
- Physiologie du bourgeois (1841)
- Scènes de la ville et de la campagne (1841)
- Les Bourgeois de Paris, scènes comiques (1854)
- Mémoires de Monsieur Joseph Prudhomme, 2 vol. (1857)
- Les Petites Gens (1857)
- Scènes parisiennes (1857)
- Galerie d’originaux (1858)
- Les Bas-fonds de la société (1862)

=== Theatre ===
- Les Mendiants (1829)
- La Famille improvisée (1831)
- Un enfant du peuple (1846)
- La Chasse au succès (1849)
- Les Compatriotes (1849)
- Grandeur et décadence de M. Joseph Prudhomme (1852)
- Le Roman chez la portière (1855)
- Les Métamorphoses de Chamoiseau (1856)
- Peintres et bourgeois (1855)
- Comédies bourgeoises (1858)
- Cendrillon ou la Pantoufle merveilleuse (1879)

== Bibliography ==
- Jules Champfleury, Henry Monnier Sa vie Son œuvre, E Dentu éditeur, Paris 1879
- ROLLET (Cyrille), Henry Monnier histoire d'un pitre ? quelques copeaux biographiques, mémoire de M2 histoire, sous la direction de Christophe Charle, Université Paris 1, 2008.
- ROLLET (Cyrille), Figurez-vous Henry Monnier..., mémoire de M2 histoire de l'art, sous la direction de Ségolène Le Men, Université Paris 10, 2006.
- Jane Roberts Fine Arts, Paris, Henry Monnier 1799-1877, A Private Collection, exhibition catalogue, 2 volumes, November–December 2013
