= M. and Mme. Joseph Prudhomme =

19th century French charicatures

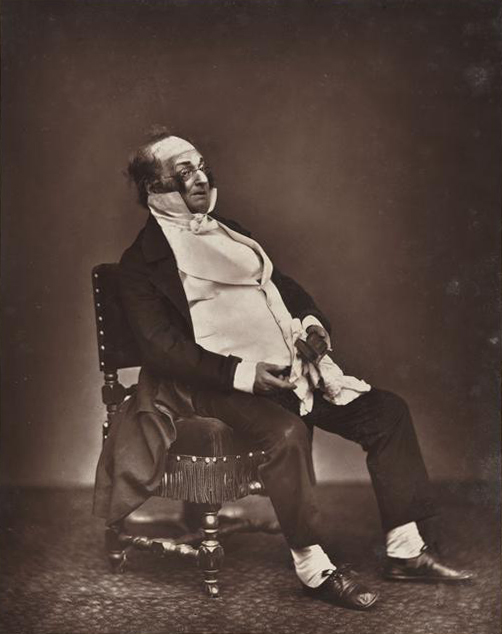
Henry Monnier playing the part of Monsieur Prudhomme (c. 1875), photograph by Étienne Carjat, musée d'Orsay

Monsieur and Madame Prudhomme were a pair of French caricature characters of the 19th century, created by Henry Monnier. They were a bourgeois couple.

Monsieur Prudhomme first appeared in 1830 in the first version of the Scènes de province dessinées à la plume, then in the play Grandeur et décadence de M. Joseph Prudhomme (1852) then in two volumes of collected drawings Mémoires de Monsieur Joseph Prudhomme (1857), then in Monsieur Prudhomme chef de brigands (1860).

Plump, foolish, conformist and sententious, Joseph was called by Honoré de Balzac “l’illustre type des bourgeois de Paris” (the classic example of the Paris middle-classes).

Two examples of Prudhomme's pontification are: « C’est l’ambition qui perd les hommes. Si Napoléon était resté officier d’artillerie, il serait encore sur le trône » (It's ambition that destroys men. If Napoleon had remained an artillery officer, he would still be on the throne) and « La nature est prévoyante : elle fait pousser la pomme en Normandie sachant que c'est dans cette région qu'on boit le plus de cidre » (Nature is far-sighted: it makes apples grow in Normandy knowing that it's in that region that people drink the most cider).

Paul Verlaine found inspiration from him for “Monsieur Prudhomme,” one of his Poèmes saturniens.

Sacha Guitry wrote a play in 1931 called “Monsieur Prudhomme a-t-il vécu?”, freely inspired by Monnier’s life, and relating to the genesis of the character.

André Franquin drew inspiration from the character for his own maire de Champignac (1950) in the cartoon series Spirou et Fantasio, another character with pontificating logorrhea.
