= Frédéric-Auguste Cazals =

French artist

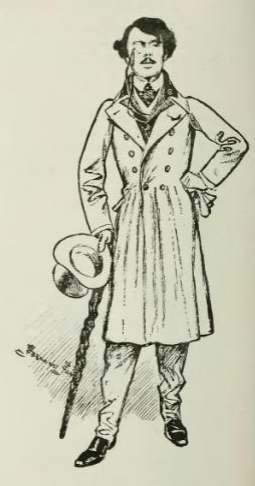
- Cazals, sketch by Fernand Fau, 1902
- Born: 1865
- Died: 1941 (aged 75–76)
- Occupations: Writer and Illustrator

Frédéric-Auguste Cazals (1865–1941) was a French writer and illustrator, also notable as one of the closest friends of Paul Verlaine from 1886 to Verlaine's death.

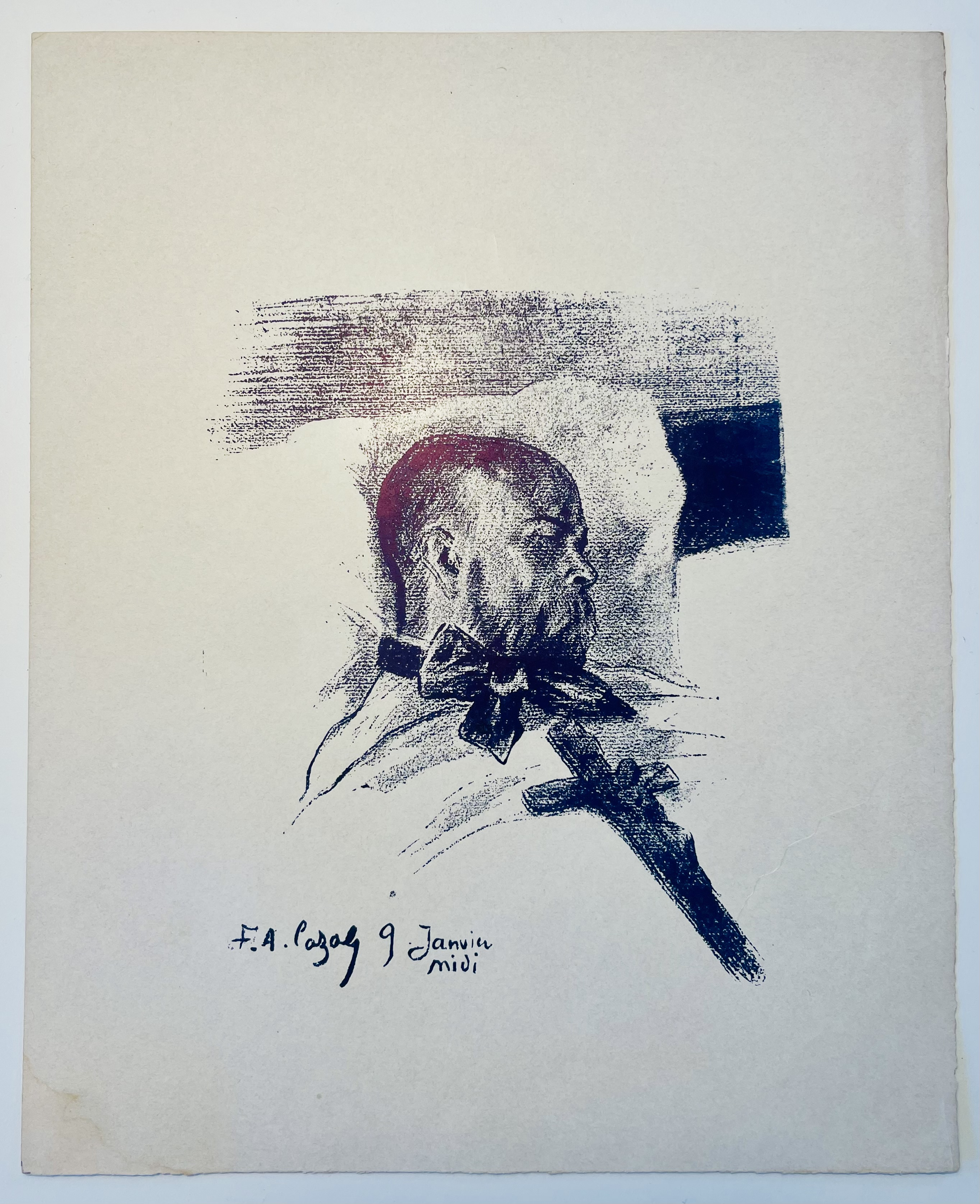
Paul Verlaine sur son lit mort par Frédéric-Auguste Cazals, 9 janvier 1896

== Works ==
- Le jardin des ronces : poèmes et chansons du pays latin, préface de Rachilde, avant-propos et notes de Serge Fauchereau, Paris, Somogy, 1995 ISBN 2-9504476-3-5
- Les derniers jours de Paul Verlaine, avec Gustave Le Rouge, préface de Maurice Barrès, Slatkine, 1983 ISBN 2-05-100492-7
