= Clair de lune (poem) =

1869 poem by Paul Verlaine

"Clair de lune" (French for "moonlight") is a poem written by French poet Paul Verlaine in 1869. It is the inspiration for the third and most famous movement of Claude Debussy's 1890 Suite bergamasque. Debussy also made two settings of the poem for voice and piano accompaniment. The poem has also been set to music by Gabriel Fauré, Louis Vierne, Sigfrid Karg-Elert, Josef Szulc, and Alphons Diepenbrock.

== Text ==
Votre âme est un paysage choisi
Que vont charmant masques et bergamasques
Jouant du luth et dansant et quasi
Tristes sous leurs déguisements fantasques.

Tout en chantant sur le mode mineur
L'amour vainqueur et la vie opportune
Ils n'ont pas l'air de croire à leur bonheur
Et leur chanson se mêle au clair de lune,

Au calme clair de lune triste et beau,
Qui fait rêver les oiseaux dans les arbres
Et sangloter d'extase les jets d'eau,
Les grands jets d'eau sveltes parmi les marbres.

Translation:

Your soul is a chosen landscape
On which masks and Bergamasques cast enchantment as they go,
Playing the lute, and dancing, and all but
Sad beneath their fantastical façades

Singing all the while, in the minor mode,
Of all-conquering love and life so kind to them
They do not seem to believe their good fortune,
And as their song mingles with the moonlight,

With the calm moonlight, sad and lovely,
Which makes the birds dream in the trees,
And the plumes of the fountains weep in ecstasy,
The tall, slender spires of the fountains among the marble sculptures.
