= Sagesse =

Collection of poems from Paul Verlaine

Sagesse (lit. 'Wisdom') is a volume of French poetry by Paul Verlaine. First published in 1881 (see 1880), it was important in the symbolist and modernist movements, as well as inspiring many musical compositions.

The poems contained in this volume include:

- Beauté des femmes.
- Bon chevalier masqué.
- C'est la fête du blé, c'est la fête du pain.
- Désormais le Sage, puni.
- Du fond du grabat.
- Écoutez la chanson bien douce.
- Et j'ai revu l'enfant unique : il m'a semblé.
- J'avais peiné comme Sisyphe.
- Je ne sais pourquoi mon esprit amer.
- Je ne veux plus aimer que ma mère Marie.
- Je suis venu calme orphelin.
- La bise se rue à travers.
- La grande ville.
- L'âme antique était rude et vaine.
- La mer est plus belle.
- La tristesse, langueur du corps humain.
- La vie humble aux travaux ennuyeux et faciles.
- L'échelonnement des haies.
- Le ciel est par-dessus le toit.
- L'ennemi se déguise en l'Ennui.
- Les chères mains qui furent miennes.
- Les faux beaux jours ont lui tout le jour.
- Le son du cor s'afflige vers les bois.
- L'espoir luit comme un brin de paille.
- L'immensité de l'humanité.
- Malheureux ! Tous les dons, la gloire du baptême....
- Mon Dieu m'a dit : Mon fils, il faut m'aimer.
- Né l'enfant des grandes villes.
- Non. Il fut gallican, ce siècle, et janséniste.
- Ô mon Dieu, vous m'avez blessé d'amour.
- On n'offense que Dieu qui seul pardonne.
- Or, vous voici promus, petits amis.
- Ô vous, comme un qui boite au loin, Chagrins et Joies.
- Parfums, couleurs, systèmes, lois.
- Parisien, mon frère à jamais étonné.
- Petits amis qui sûtes nous prouver.
- Pourquoi triste, ô mon âme.
- Prince mort en soldat à cause de la France.
- Qu'en dis-tu, voyageur, des pays et des gares ?.
- Sagesse d'un Louis Racine, je t'envie.
- Sainte Thérèse veut que la Pauvreté.
- Toutes les amours de la terre.
- Un grand sommeil noir.
- Va ton chemin sans plus t'inquiéter.
- Voix de l'Orgueil : un cri puissant comme d'un cor.
- Vous êtes calme, vous voulez un voeu discret.
- Vous reviendrez bientôt, les bras pleins de pardons.
- Vous voilà pauvres bonnes pensées.
