= Suite bergamasque =

Piano composition by Claude Debussy

- by Claude Debussy
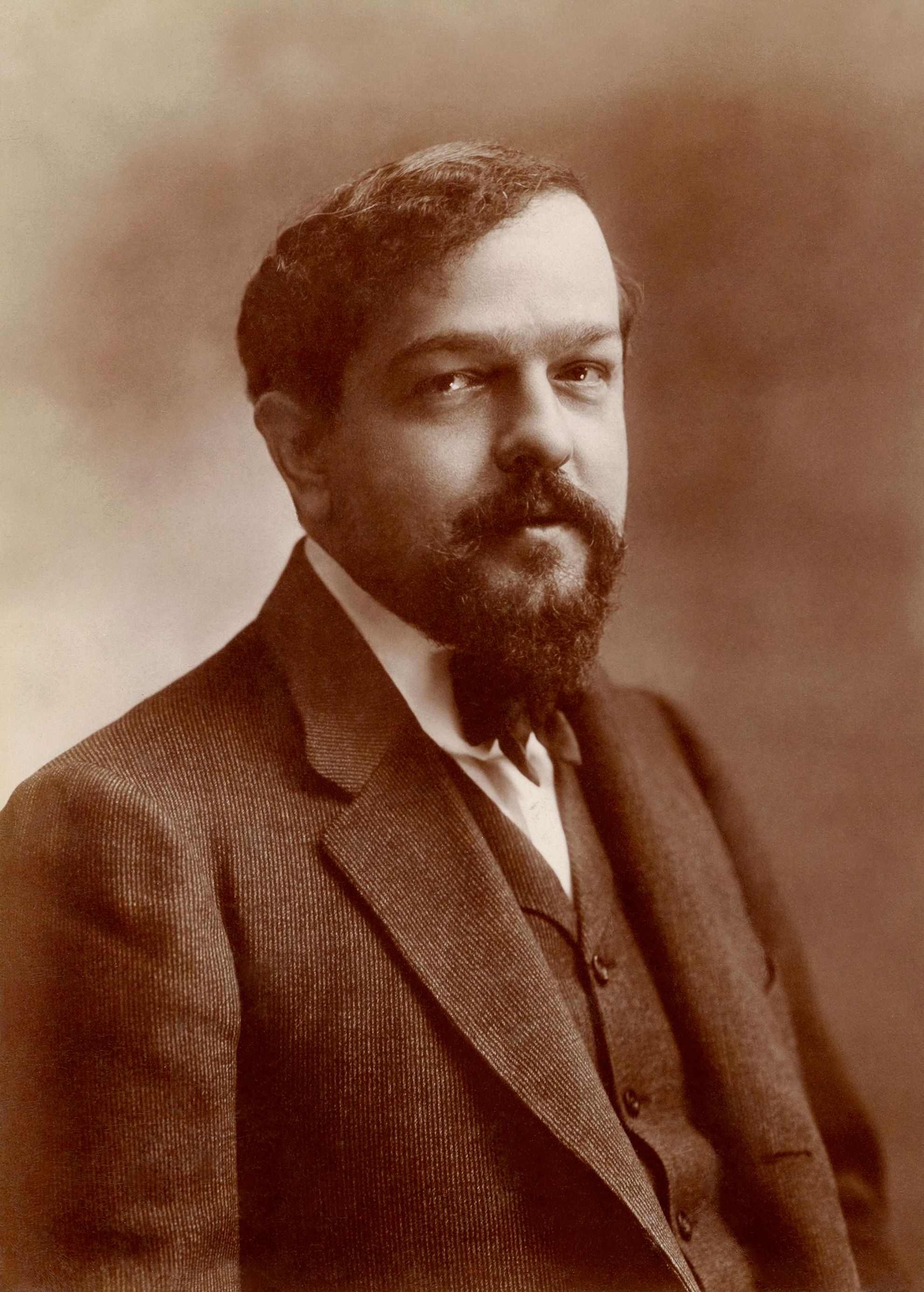
- Claude Debussy c. 1900 by Atelier Nadar
- Catalogue: L. 75
- Composed: 1890–1905
- Published: 1905 by E. Fromont
- Movements: 4

Suite bergamasque (L. 75) (French pronunciation: [sɥit bɛʁɡamask]) is a piano suite by Claude Debussy. He began composing it around 1890, at the age of 28, but significantly revised it just before its 1905 publication. The popularity of the third movement, Clair de lune, has made it one of the composer's most famous works for piano, as well as one of the most famous musical pieces of all time.

== Background ==
Debussy was initially unwilling to use these relatively early piano compositions because they were not in his mature style, but in 1905 he accepted the offer of a publisher who thought they would be successful, given the fame Debussy had gained in the intervening fifteen years. While it is not known how much of the Suite was written in 1890 and how much was written in 1905, it is clear that Debussy changed the names of at least two of the pieces. Passepied had first been composed under the title Pavane, while Clair de lune was originally entitled Promenade sentimentale. These names come from poems by Paul Verlaine. The title of the third movement of Suite bergamasque is taken from Verlaine's poem "Clair de lune", which refers to bergamasks in the opening stanza:

Votre âme est un paysage choisi
Que vont charmant masques et bergamasques
Jouant du luth et dansant et quasi
Tristes sous leurs déguisements fantasques.

Translation:

Your soul is like a landscape fantasy,
Where masks and bergamasks, in charming wise,
Strum lutes and dance, just a bit sad to be
Hidden beneath their fanciful disguise.

== Structure ==
Suite bergamasque consists of four movements:

1. Prélude (Moderato tempo rubato, F major, 4/4)
2. Menuet (Andante, A minor, 3/4)
3. Clair de lune (Andante très expressif, D♭ major, 9/8)
4. Passepied (Allegretto ma non troppo, F♯ minor, 4/4)

=== 1. Prélude ===
The first piece in the suite is in the key of F major and marked moderato tempo rubato. Its legato phrases give it a smooth, flowing feel.

=== 2. Menuet ===
The second movement is in A minor. Rather than mimicking the articulations of a baroque minuet from the start, Debussy eschews the accent on the downbeat of the first measures. The light, fluttery embellishments Debussy writes throughout the movement give it the character of an arabesque.

=== 3. Clair de lune ===
Beginning of the middle section of the movement

"Clair de lune"
Performed by Laurens Goedhart in 2011 (5:04)

The third movement is in D♭ major. It is written in compound triple meter (9/8) and marked andante très expressif. Its title, which means "moonlight" in French, is taken from Verlaine's poem "Clair de lune". It is not to be confused with the two settings of the poem composed by Debussy for voice and piano accompaniment.

=== 4. Passepied ===
The final movement is in F♯ minor, marked allegretto ma non troppo. A passepied is a type of dance that originated in Brittany. This movement is fast and light, with the left hand playing an almost continuous quaver or eighth-note accompaniment. The movement includes the use of 3 against 4 polyrhythm.

== Arrangements ==
Suite bergamasque has been orchestrated and arranged by many people, both for concert performance and for use in other media.

In particular, Clair de lune has been arranged for a wide variety of instrumental combinations, including notable orchestrations by André Caplet, Leopold Stokowski, and Lucien Cailliet.

Clair de lune was originally intended to be included as a fully orchestrated piece in the 1940 Walt Disney animated film Fantasia. However, due to runtime issues, it was eventually not included in the final cut of the film. Instead, the footage for its intended segment (featuring herons in the Florida Everglades at night) was recycled for the "Blue Bayou" segment of the subsequent film Make Mine Music (1946). However, the "Clair de lune" segment was later restored after a workprint of it was rediscovered in 1992, complete with an original score by Stokowski and the Philadelphia Orchestra. It is included as a bonus feature in some later releases of Fantasia.

Passepied was arranged by the Punch Brothers for bluegrass instrumentation for their album The Phosphorescent Blues.

A synthesizer version was produced by the Japanese electronic music pioneer Isao Tomita for his 1974 album Snowflakes Are Dancing, consisting of arrangements and renditions of compositions by Debussy, including Passepied. It was used at the Closing Ceremony at the 2020 Summer Olympics in Tokyo on 8 August 2021, as a nod to Paris as the next host city, while children prayed for peace and as the Olympic Flame was extinguished.

A cover version of Clair de lune with English lyrics written by Janet McMahan and Penny Aust and titled Moonlight was performed by Nashville singer Stephanie Hall Wedan as part of the 2000 lullaby compilation album Baby Loves Classics released by Brentwood-Benson Music.

A cover version of Clair de lune with Spanish lyrics written by Rafael Jaime Zorrilla and titled Vuelvo a Nacer (I Am Born Again) was prominently featured in the 2024 live-action Mexican independent short film Mi Hermano Lobo (My Brother Wolf). The song was performed off-screen by 8-year-old stage child actor and singer Jorge Luis Jiménez Avilés in the lead role of Rafael (in his film debut).

Japanese video game composer Masafumi Takada features Clair de lune in many of his works, including in Flower, Sun, and Rain, Danganronpa V3: Killing Harmony, and The Hundred Line: Last Defense Academy.
