= Prince des poètes =

Prince des poètes (French: Prince of poets) is an honorific and unofficial title given in France to French-speaking poets of various nationalities.

Poets who have held the title include Pierre de Ronsard (16th century), Charles Marie René Leconte de Lisle (1885–1894), Paul Verlaine (1894–1896), Stéphane Mallarmé (1896–1898), Léon Dierx (1898–1912), Paul Fort (1912–1960), Jules Supervielle (1960), Jean Cocteau (1960–1963), Maurice Carême (1972–1978), and Léopold Sédar Senghor (1978–2001).

== See also ==
- French poetry
- Iffland-Ring
