= Poèmes saturniens =

Collection of poems by Paul Verlaine

Poèmes saturniens is the first collection of poetry by Paul Verlaine, first published in 1866.

At the time of the collection's publication, Verlaine was linked with the Parnassien movement in French poetry. He published his first poem, 'Monsieur Prudhomme', in their journal, Revue du Progrès moral, littéraire, scientifique et artistique, in August 1863. His poetry featured in Le Parnasse contemporain and Poèmes saturniens collects all but one of the poems he published there. The collection is thought to be a partial re-working of an earlier collection planned under the title Poèmes et Sonnets.

The collection is divided into sections under the headings:

- Melancholia
  - "Résignation"
  - "Nevermore"
  - "Après trois ans"
  - "Voeu"
  - "Lassitude"
  - "Mon rêve familier"
  - "À une femme"
  - "L’Angoisse"
- Eaux-Fortes
  - "Croquis parisien"
  - "Cauchemar"
  - "Marine"
  - "Effet de nuit"
  - "Grotesques"
- Paysages tristes
  - "Soleils couchants"
  - "Crépuscule du soir mystique"
  - "Promenade sentimentale"
  - "Nuit du Walpurgis classique"
  - "Chanson d'automne" (famous for phrases use as a message to the Resistance in 1944)
  - "L’Heure du berger"
  - "Le Rossignol"
- Caprices
  - "Femme et chatte"
  - "Jésuitisme"
  - "La Chanson des ingénues"
  - "Une grande dame"
  - "Monsieur Prudhomme"
- Autres poèmes
  - "Initium"
  - "Çavitrî"
  - "Sub urbe"
  - "Sérénade"
  - "Un dahlia"
  - "Nevermore (2)"
  - "Il bacio"
  - "Dans les bois"
  - "Nocturne parisien"
  - "Marco"
  - "César Borgia"
  - "La Mort de Philippe II"
