= La Bonne Chanson (poetry collection) =

Poetry collection by Paul Verlaine

La Bonne Chanson is a collection of poems written by Paul Verlaine from the winter of 1869 to the spring of 1870. Twenty-one poems belong to this group, and are addressed to sixteen-year-old Mathilde Mauté de Fleurville, whom he married in the same year (1870).

The poems are a proclamation of love, using very direct terms, and some references to nature.

Between 1892 and 1894, Gabriel Fauré arranged nine of these poems as a song cycle of the same name.

== Sources ==
- National Library of the Netherlands page, accessed 20 January 2010
