= La Bonne Chanson (Fauré) =

Song cycle for voice and piano by Gabriel Fauré

La Bonne Chanson, Op. 61, by Gabriel Fauré, is a song cycle of nine mélodies for voice and piano. He composed it during 1892–94; in 1898 he created a version for voice, piano and string quintet. The cycle is based on nine of the poems from the collection of the same name by Paul Verlaine. According to Fauré himself, the song cycle contains a number of musical themes which recur from song to song. He had devised this technique for the 1891 song cycle Cinq mélodies "de Venise", which was also based on Verlaine's poetry.

== Composition ==
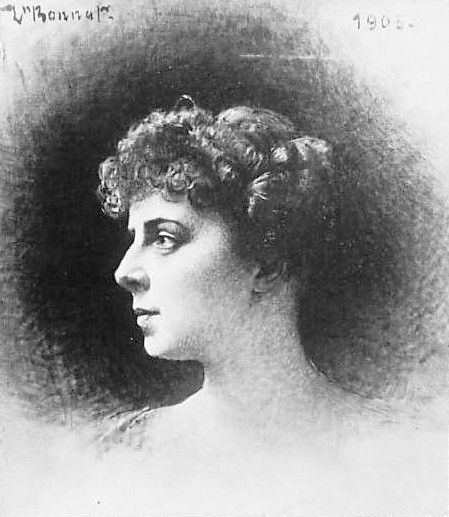
Emma Bardac after a portrait by Léon Bonnat

Much of the cycle was composed in the summers of 1892 and 1893 while Fauré was staying in Bougival, as the guest of the banker Sigismond Bardac and his wife, the soprano Emma Bardac. Fauré was in love with her (although she later married Claude Debussy). Fauré wrote later that the cycle was his most spontaneous creation, with Bardac singing the newly composed material for him each day. The final song, "L'hiver a cessé", was completed in February 1894, and the cycle was published by Hamelle that year, with a dedication to Emma Bardac.

In a 1902 interview conducted by Louis Aguettant for Le Courrier musical, Fauré enumerated five main musical themes which recur throughout the cycle until they appear together in the final song, "L'hiver a cessé". One of these themes was taken from his earlier mélodie "Lydia", Op. 4, No. 2 (c. 1870); Fauré stated that he associated this theme with a singer, possibly meaning Emma Bardac.

== Settings ==
Fauré's settings are as follows:

1. "Une sainte en son auréole"
2. "Puisque l'aube grandit"
3. "La lune blanche luit dans les bois"
4. "J'allais par des chemins perfides"
5. "J'ai presque peur, en vérité"
6. "Avant que tu ne t'en ailles"
7. "Donc, ce sera par un clair jour d'été"
8. "N'est-ce pas?"
9. "L'hiver a cessé"

Fauré's ordering of the settings does not correspond to that of their appearances within Verlaine's collection of 21 poems.

== Premieres ==
La Bonne Chanson had a private premiere at the residence of the Countess de Saussine on 25 April 1894, sung by Maurice Bagès. Its first public performance was at the Société Nationale de Musique on 20 April 1895, sung by Jeanne Remacle. Fauré was the pianist. The work was not well received by the musically conservative audience. Camille Saint-Saëns declared that Fauré had gone mad. In contrast, Marcel Proust, who was at the private premiere in 1894, wrote that he adored it.

The string quintet version was premiered in London, on 1 April 1898 at the house of Frank Schuster, with Bagès and Fauré performing.

In 1918 Fauré adapted and extended a brief section from "Une sainte en son auréole" to produce Une châtelaine en sa tour, Op. 110, a work for solo harp dedicated to the harpist Micheline Kahn. She premiered the work at the Société Nationale de Musique on 30 November 1918.

== Recordings ==
- Charles Panzéra and Magdeleine Panzéra-Baillot (1936) French HMV
- Suzanne Danco and Guido Agosti (1952), Decca
- Pierre Mollet and Simone Gouat (1954), Accord
- Hugues Cuénod and Martin Isepp (1973), Nimbus Records
- Sarah Walker and the Nash Ensemble (1980), CRD Records
- Bernard Kruysen and Noël Lee (1986), Astrée
- Gérard Souzay and Dalton Baldwin (1989), Philips
- Anne Sofie von Otter, Bengt Forsberg and string quintet (1996), Deutsche Grammophon
- Wolfgang Holzmair and Gerard Wyss (1996), Philips
- Sanford Sylvan and David Breitman and the Lydia String Quartet (1996), Nonesuch Records
- Christopher Maltman and Graham Johnson (2002-04), Hyperion
- Ian Bostridge, Julius Drake, Belcea Quartet and Leon Bosch (2004), EMI Records.
- Verena Rein, soprano and Čiurlionis Quartet and Sergejus Okruško, piano (2005), Dreyer • Gaido
- Erin O'Meally, Soprano and Kevin Korth, Piano (2016) San Francisco Conservatory of Music

== Sources ==
- "La bonne chanson". LA Phil (Los Angeles Philharmonic). Archived from the original on 29 February 2012.
- Nectoux, Jean-Michel (2004). Gabriel Fauré: A Musical Life. Cambridge: Cambridge University Press. ISBN 0-521-61695-6.
- Orledge, Robert (1979). Gabriel Fauré. London: Eulenburg Books. ISBN 0-903873-40-0.
