= Paul Verlaine =

French poet (1844–1896)

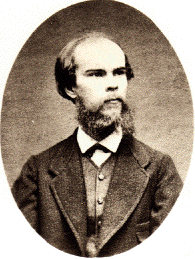
- Verlaine, c. 1890
- Born: Paul Marie Verlaine; 30 March 1844; Metz, Lorraine, Kingdom of France
- Died: 8 January 1896 (aged 51); Paris, French Republic
- Resting place: Batignolles Cemetery
- Education: Lycée Condorcet
- Occupations: Poet; short story writer; critic
- Spouse: Mathilde Mauté (m. 1870; div. 1885)
- Partner: Arthur Rimbaud (1871–1873)
- Children: 1
- Writing career
- Pen name: Pablo de Herlagnez; Pablo-Maria de Herlañes; Pierre et Paul; Pauvre Lelian
- Language: French
- Years active: 1858–1896
- Genres: Poetry; short stories; criticism; journalism; non-fiction
- Movements: Symbolism; Parnassianism; Decadence

Paul Marie Verlaine (/vɛərˈlɛn/ vair-LEN; French: [pɔl maʁi vɛʁlɛn]; 30 March 1844 – 8 January 1896) was a French poet, writer and critic associated with the Symbolist, Parnassianist and Decadent movements. He is considered one of the paramount exponents of the fin de siècle in French and international poetry.

Born in Metz to a petit-bourgeois family, Verlaine bore a lifelong interest in the arts, whether literary, musical or visual. His début collection, Poèmes saturniens (1866), were released at the age of twenty-two; they were published by Alphonse Lemerre. Verlaine's tempestuous sexual relationship with young poet Arthur Rimbaud (ten years his junior and under eighteen years, and while he himself had a wife and infant son), a fellow member of the Zutistes, aroused great controversy. The couple would peregrinate throughout England and Belgium until their split in 1873, which was caused by him wounding Rimbaud with a revolver. Following trial, Verlaine was sentenced to two years in prison for battery and sodomy. During his sentence, Verlaine reverted to practising Catholicism and composed Sagesse (published 1880), Jadis et naguère (published 1884) and Parallèlement (published 1889). As his reputation grew, he became increasingly haunted by guilt and paranoia, lapsing into depression, alcohol and chemical abuse and disease, culminating in his death in Paris from acute pneumonia.

Revered for his lyrical sensibility and subtlety in nuance, Verlaine is acknowledged as one of the archetypical poètes maudits ('accursed poets'), a phrase he popularised but did not coin. His promise was evident even in his early work: his engagement with musicality, fluidity, wordplay, polysemy and prosodical manipulation attracted much admiration. His œuvre is highly eclectic, exploiting the characteristics of the French language; critics have noted interplays with melancholy and chiaroscuro, as well as a pioneering of metaphor and allegory. Beyond these characteristics lies a profound introspection which resonated with many contemporaneous artists, including those outside the literary sphere (such as Impressionist painters).

Numerous composers have set Verlaine's poetry to music or used his work as inspiration for their compositions; they include Nadia Boulanger, Claude Debussy (Clair de lune inspired the third movement of Debussy's Suite bergamasque), Frederick Delius, Louis Durey, Gabriel Fauré (Cinq Mélodies "de Venise" and La Bonne Chanson), Léo Ferré (his album Verlaine et Rimbaud), Reynaldo Hahn, Arthur Honegger, Sigfrid Karg-Elert, Charles Koechlin, Jules Massenet, Olivier Messiaen, Poldowski, Maurice Ravel, Jeanne Rivet, Camille Saint-Saëns, Kaikhosru Shapurji Sorabji, Igor Stravinsky, Anna Teichmüller, Edgard Varèse (Un grand sommeil noir), Ralph Vaughan Williams, Louis Vierne and many more. Verlaine himself was aware of this and apparently pleased; he also wrote operatic libretti, particularly for Emmanuel Chabrier.

He was honoured with the title of Prince of Poets in 1894 following a referendum organised by Maurice Barrès consulting various people of letters.

== Biography ==
=== Early life ===
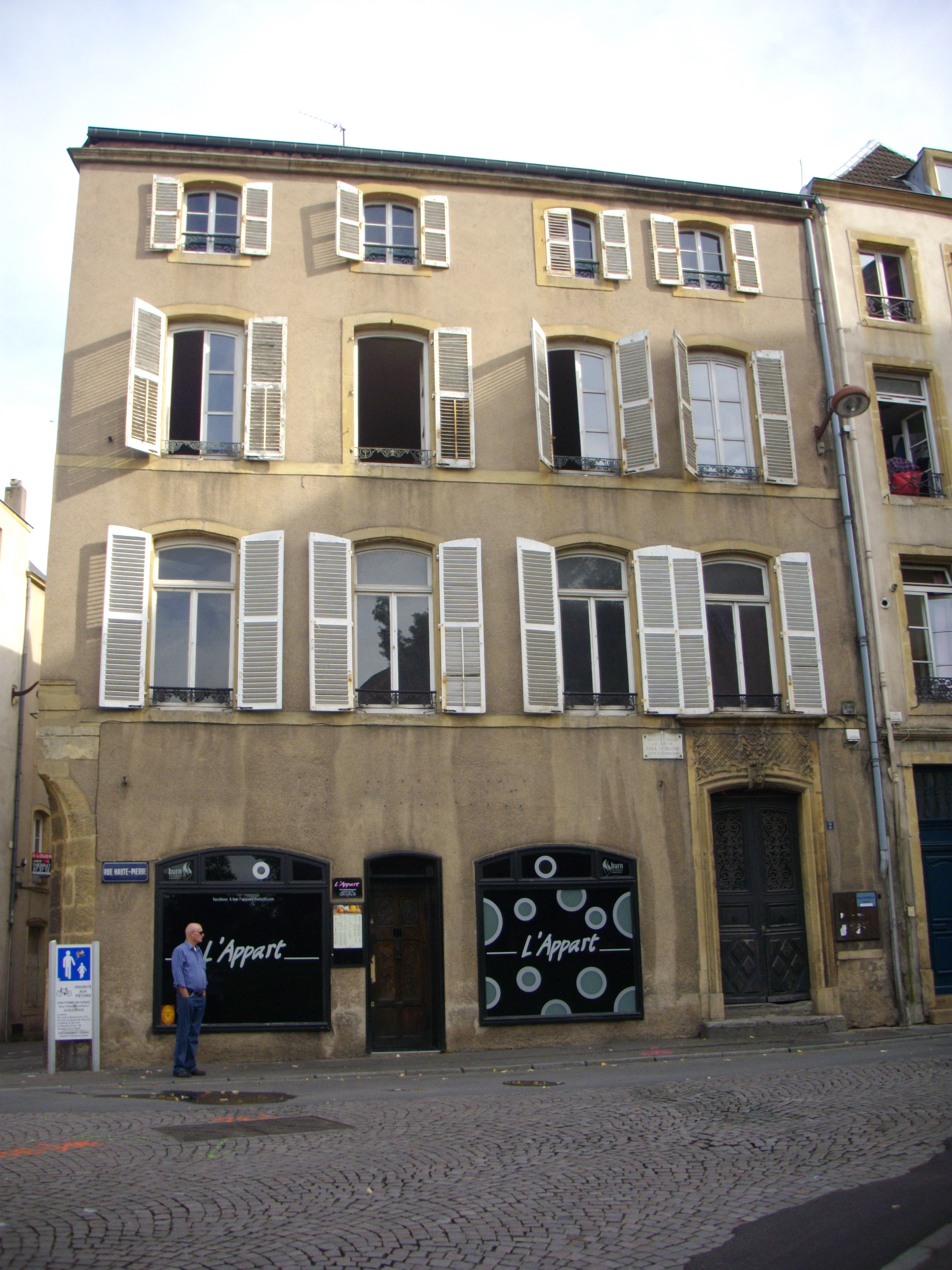
Verlaine's birthplace in Metz, today a museum dedicated to his life and œuvre

Verlaine was born in 2 rue de la Haute-Pierre in Metz, Grand Est, to devout Catholics Nicolas-Auguste Verlaine (born in Bertrix, Belgium) and Élisa-Stéphanie Dehée. The couple were married for thirteen years, and Dehée miscarried thrice beforehand. They baptised their son Paul Marie, with his middle name given out of gratitude to the Virgin Mary for his survival. He was their only biological child; however, he had an elder stepsister (his orphaned cousin) who was adopted in 1836, Élisa.

He was educated at the Lycée Impérial Bonaparte (now the Lycée Condorcet) in Paris and then took up a post in the civil service. He spent part of his childhood in the Batignolles district of Paris, particularly at 10 rue Nollet, where he lived with his family. He began writing poetry at an early age, and was initially influenced by the Parnassien movement and its leader, Leconte de Lisle. Verlaine's first published poem was published in 1863 in La Revue du progrès, a publication founded by poet Louis-Xavier de Ricard. Verlaine was a frequenter of the salon of the Marquise de Ricard (Louis-Xavier de Ricard's mother) at 10 Boulevard des Batignolles and other social venues, where he rubbed shoulders with prominent artistic figures of the day: Anatole France, Emmanuel Chabrier, inventor-poet and humorist Charles Cros, the cynical anti-bourgeois idealist Villiers de l'Isle-Adam, Théodore de Banville, François Coppée, Jose-Maria de Heredia, Leconte de Lisle, Catulle Mendes and others. Verlaine's first published collection, Poèmes saturniens (1866), though adversely commented upon by Sainte-Beuve, established him as a poet of promise and originality.

=== Marriage and military service ===
Mathilde Sophie Marie Mauté de Fleurville (17 April 1853 – 13 November 1914), who was born in Nogent-le-Rotrou and died in Nice, married Verlaine on 11 August 1870 at Notre-Dame de Clignancourt. Mauté was a writer herself.

At the proclamation of the Third Republic in the same year, Verlaine joined the 160th battalion of the Garde nationale, turning Communard on 18 March 1871.

Verlaine became head of the press bureau of the Central Committee of the Paris Commune. Verlaine escaped the deadly street fighting known as the Bloody Week, or Semaine sanglante, and went into hiding in the Pas-de-Calais.

=== Relationships with Rimbaud and Létinois ===
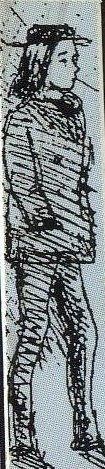
Caricature of Rimbaud drawn by Verlaine in 1872

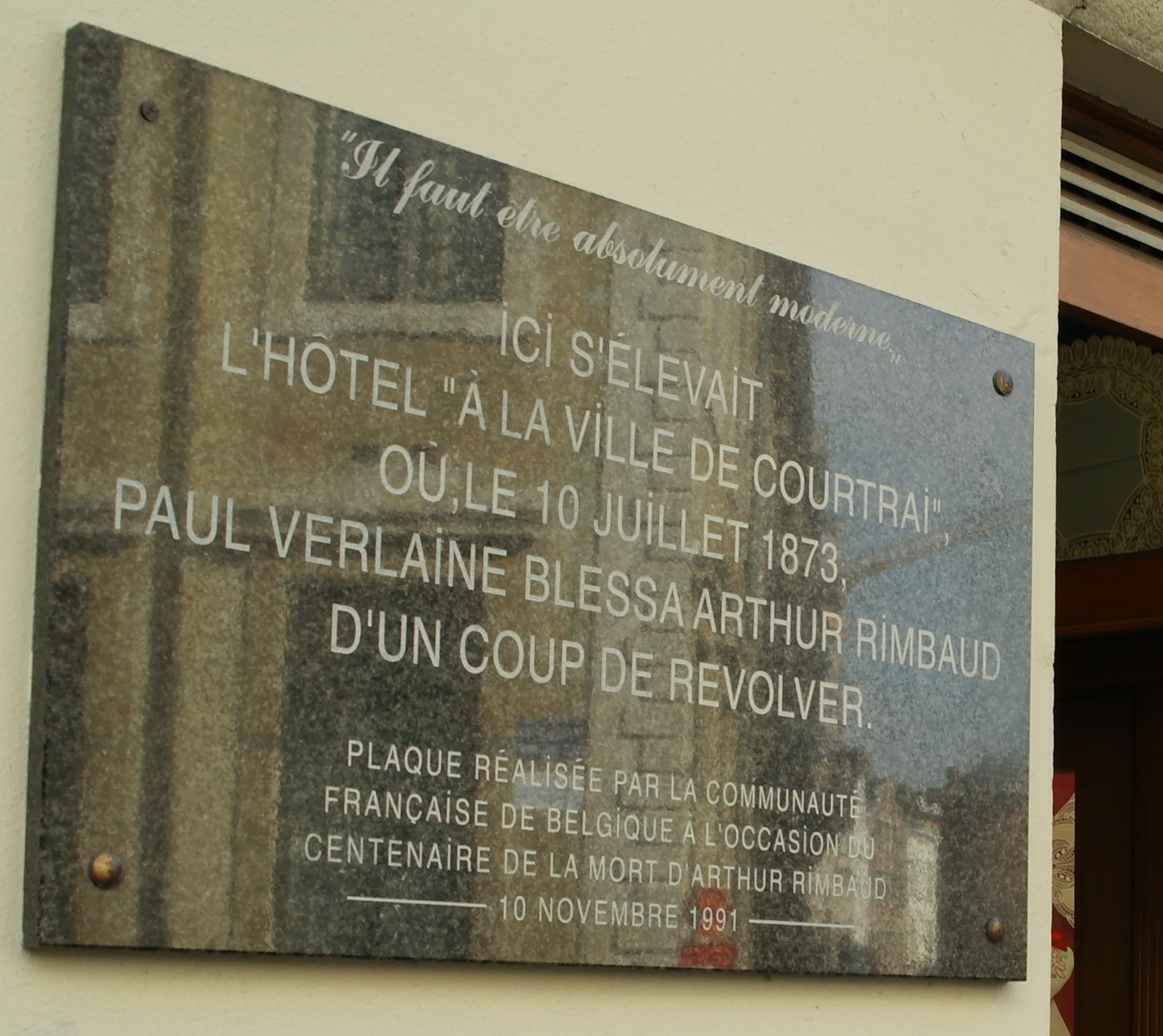
Plaque in Brussels marking the building where Verlaine shot Rimbaud

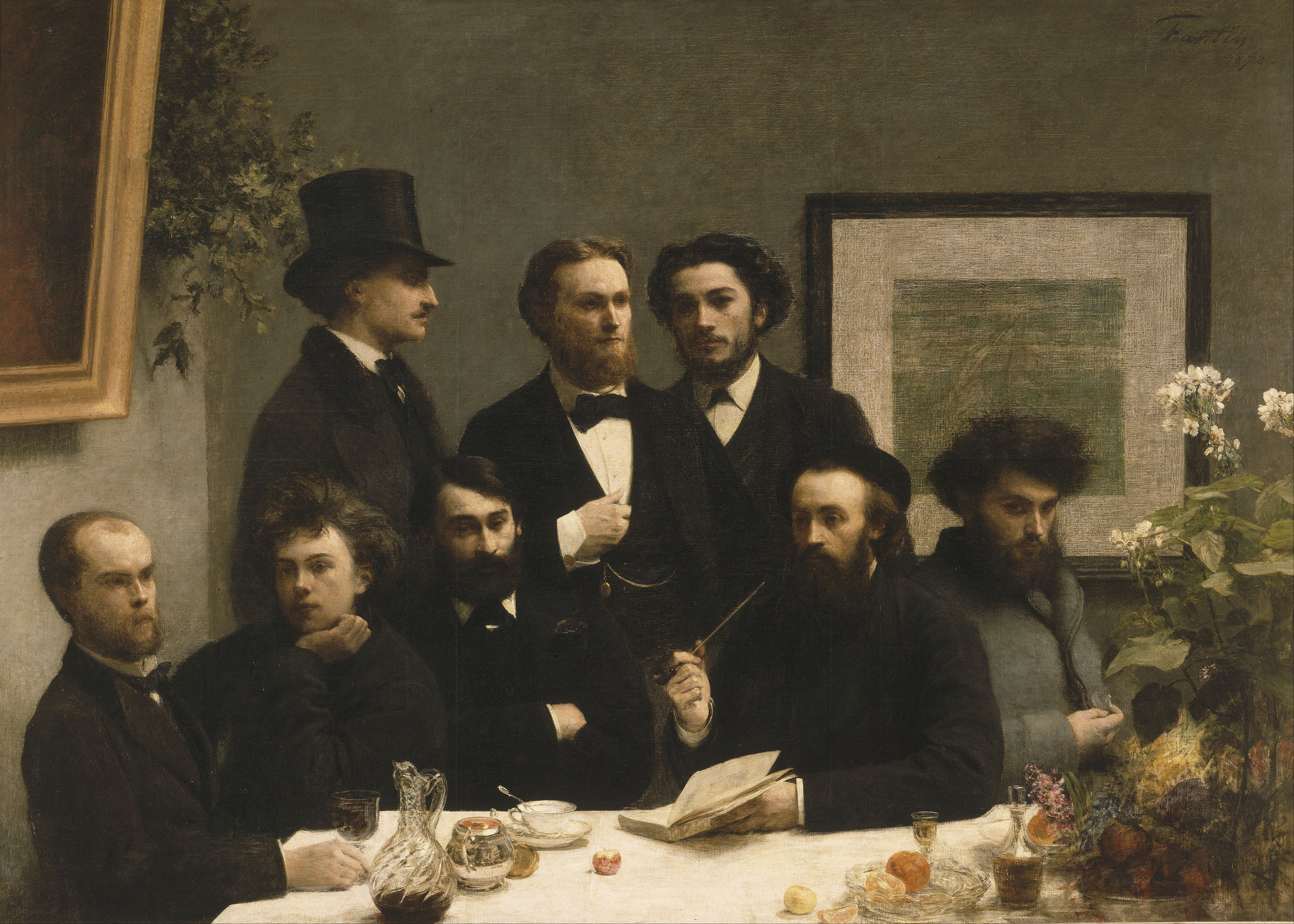
By the table, an 1872 painting by Henri Fantin-Latour. Verlaine is on the far left and Rimbaud is at the second to the left.

Verlaine returned to Paris in August 1871, and, in September, received the first letter from fellow poet Arthur Rimbaud, who admired his poetry. Verlaine urged Rimbaud to come to Paris, and by 1872, he had lost interest in Mathilde, and effectively abandoned her and their son, preferring the company of Rimbaud, who was by now his lover. Rimbaud and Verlaine's stormy affair took them to London in 1872.

In Brussels on July 12, 1873, in a drunken, jealous rage, Verlaine fired two shots with a pistol at his lover, Rimbaud, wounding his left wrist, though not seriously injuring the poet. As an indirect result of this incident, Verlaine was arrested and imprisoned at Mons for one year and six months, where he underwent a re-conversion to Roman Catholicism, which again influenced his work and provoked Rimbaud's sharp criticism.

The poems collected in Romances sans paroles (1874) were written between 1872 and 1873, inspired by Verlaine's nostalgically coloured recollections of his life with Mathilde on the one hand and impressionistic sketches of his on-again off-again year-long escapade with Rimbaud on the other. Romances sans paroles was published while Verlaine was imprisoned. Following his release from prison, Verlaine again travelled to England, where he worked for some years as a teacher, teaching French, Latin, Greek and drawing at William Lovell's school in Stickney in Lincolnshire.

From there he went to teach in nearby Boston, before moving to Bournemouth. While in England, he produced another successful collection, Sagesse. Verlaine returned to France in 1877 and, while teaching English at a school in Rethel, fell in love with one of his pupils, Lucien Létinois, who inspired Verlaine to write further poems. Verlaine was devastated when Létinois died of typhus in 1883.

=== Final years ===
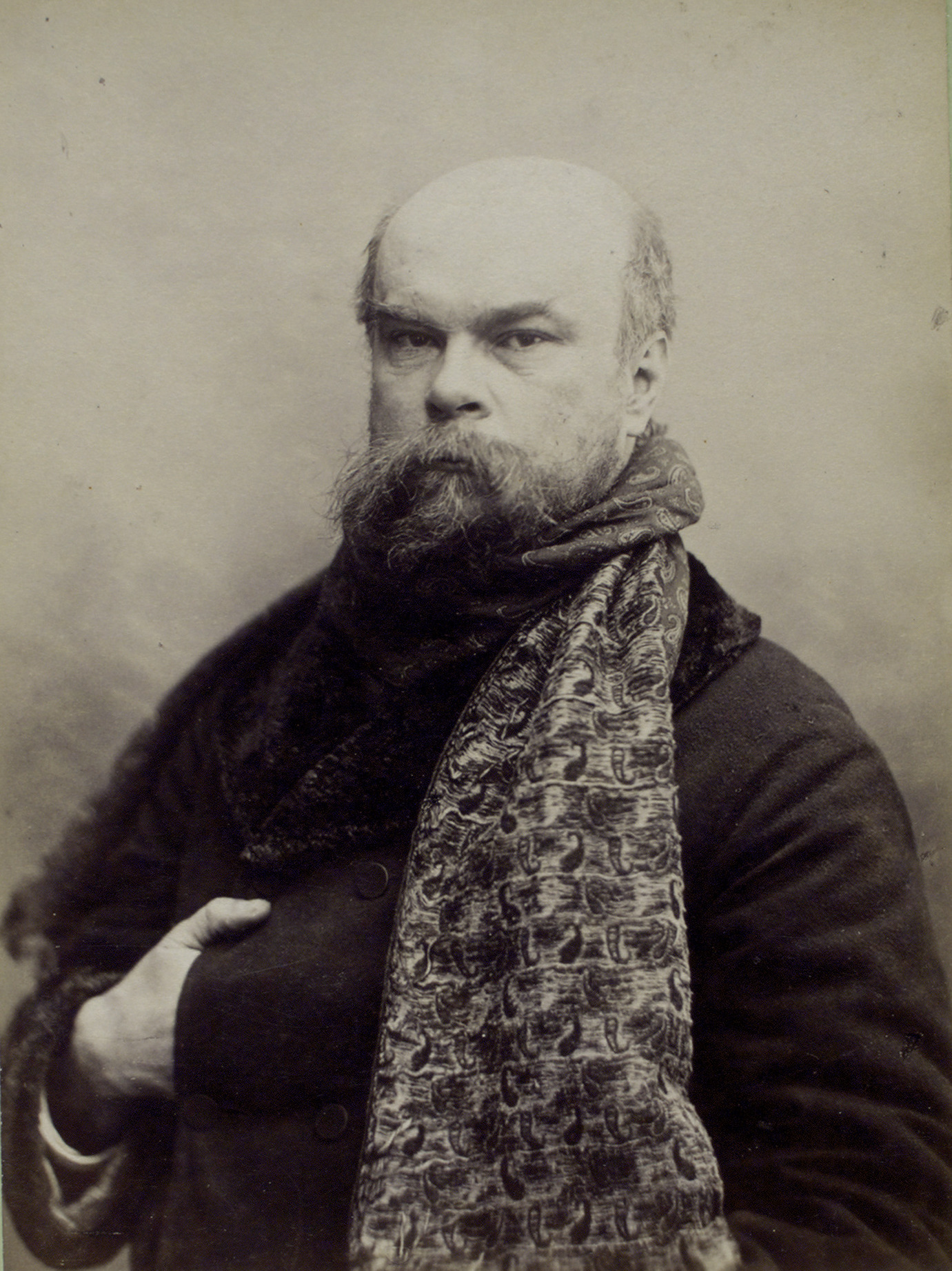
Verlaine in 1893; photograph by Otto Wegener

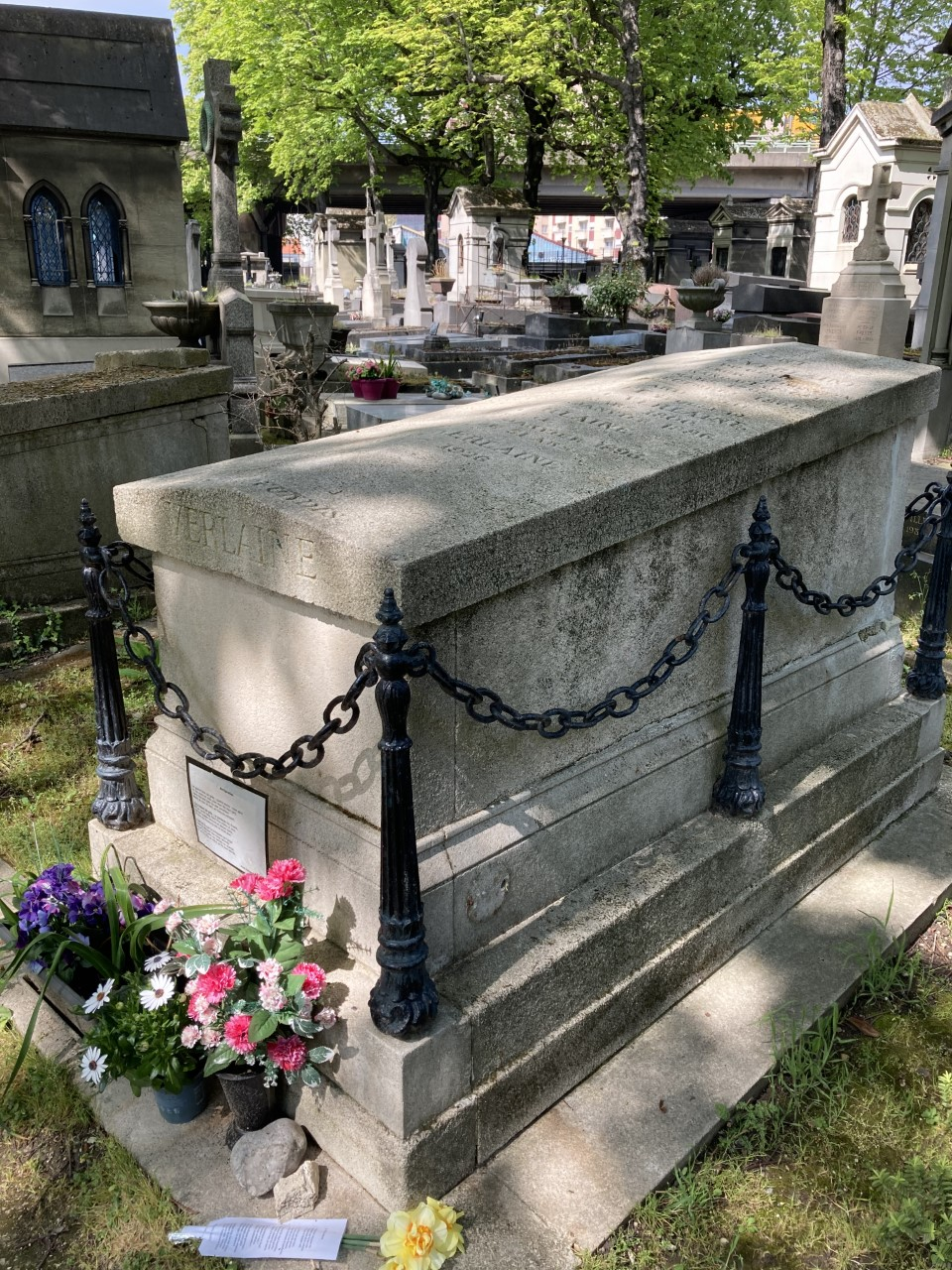
Verlaine's grave in the Cimetière des Batignolles

Verlaine's last years saw his descent into drug addiction, alcoholism, and poverty. He lived in slums and public hospitals, and spent his days drinking absinthe in Paris cafés. However, the people's love for his art resurrected support and brought in an income for Verlaine: his early poetry was rediscovered, his lifestyle and strange behaviour in front of crowds attracted admiration, and in 1894 he was elected France's "Prince of Poets" by his peers.

Verlaine's poetry was admired and recognized as ground-breaking, and served as a source of inspiration to composers. Gabriel Fauré composed many mélodies, such as the song cycles Cinq mélodies "de Venise" and La bonne chanson, which were settings of Verlaine's poems. Claude Debussy set to music Clair de lune and six of the Fêtes galantes poems, forming part of the mélodie collection known as the Recueil Vasnier; he also made another setting of Clair de lune, and the poem inspired the third movement of his Suite bergamasque. Reynaldo Hahn set several of Verlaine's poems as did the Belgian-British composer Poldowski (daughter of Henryk Wieniawski), German composer Anna Teichmüller, and French composer Jeanne Rivet.

Verlaine's drug dependence and alcoholism took a toll on his life. He died in Paris at the age of 51 on 8 January 1896; he was buried in the Cimetière des Batignolles (he was first buried in the 20th division, but his grave was moved to the 11th division—on the roundabout, a much better location—when the Boulevard Périphérique was built).

A bust monument to Verlaine sculpted by Rodo was erected in 1911. It sits in the Luxembourg Gardens in Paris.

== Style ==
Monument to Verlaine sculpted by Rodo in 1911; Jardin du Luxembourg, Paris

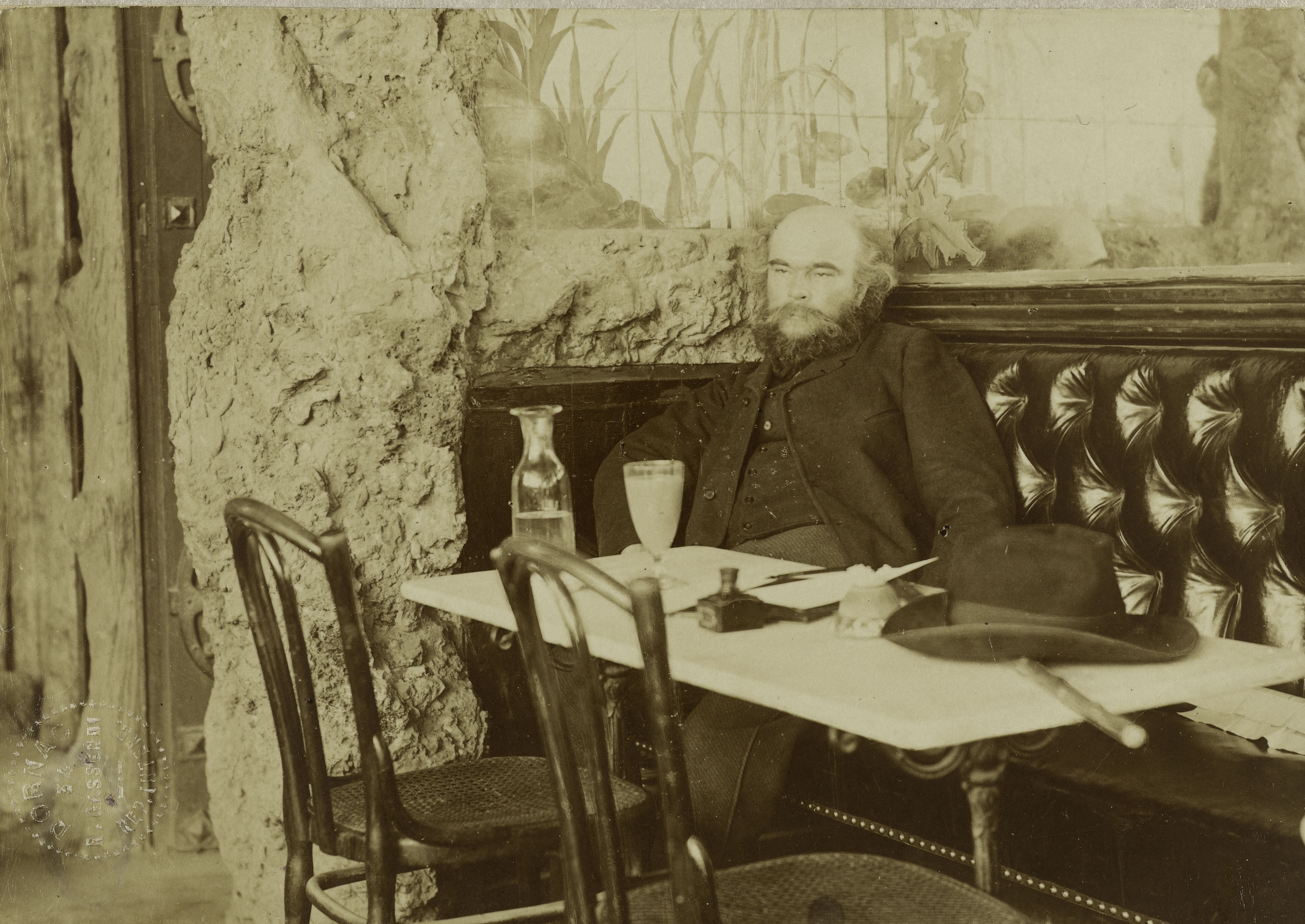
Verlaine drinking absinthe in the Café François 1er (photograph by Dornac, 1892)

Much of the French poetry produced during the fin de siècle was characterized as "decadent" for its lurid content or moral vision. In a similar vein, Verlaine used the expression poète maudit ("cursed poet") in 1884 to refer to a number of poets like Stéphane Mallarmé, Arthur Rimbaud, Aloysius Bertrand, Comte de Lautréamont, Tristan Corbière or Alice de Chambrier, who had fought against poetic conventions and suffered social rebuke, or were ignored by the critics. But with the publication of Jean Moréas' Symbolist Manifesto in 1886, it was the term symbolism which was most often applied to the new literary environment. Along with Verlaine, Mallarmé, Rimbaud, Paul Valéry, Albert Samain and many others began to be referred to as "Symbolists." These poets would often share themes that parallel Schopenhauer's aesthetics and notions of will, fatality and unconscious forces, and used themes of sex (such as prostitutes), the city, irrational phenomena (delirium, dreams, narcotics, alcohol), and sometimes a vaguely medieval setting.

In poetry, the symbolist procedure—as typified by Verlaine—was to use subtle suggestion instead of precise statement (rhetoric was banned) and to evoke moods and feelings through the magic of words and repeated sounds and the cadence of verse (musicality) and metrical innovation.

Verlaine described his typically decadent style in great detail in his poem "Art Poétique," describing the primacy of musicality and the importance of elusiveness and "the Odd." He spoke of veils and nuance and implored poets to "Keep away from the murderous Sharp Saying, Cruel Wit, and Impure Laugh." It is with these lyrical veils in mind that Verlaine concluded by suggesting that a poem should be a "happy occurrence."

An example of Verlaine's subtle use of rhyme, puns and imagery is the untranslatable stanza: "Il pleure dans mon coeur / comme il pleut sur la ville. / Quelle est cette langueur / qui pénètre mon coeur ?" This phrase begins with a portmanteau between "Je pleure" (I am crying) and "Il pleut" (It's raining) and continues by carrying through both the emotion and the vowel sound of the "eu" common to "pleure" and "pleut."

== Portraits ==
Numerous artists painted Verlaine's portrait. Among the most illustrious were Henri Fantin-Latour, Antonio de la Gándara, Eugène Carrière, Gustave Courbet, Frédéric-Auguste Cazals, and Théophile-Alexandre Steinlen, Ferdinand Bac, Émile Cohl (...)

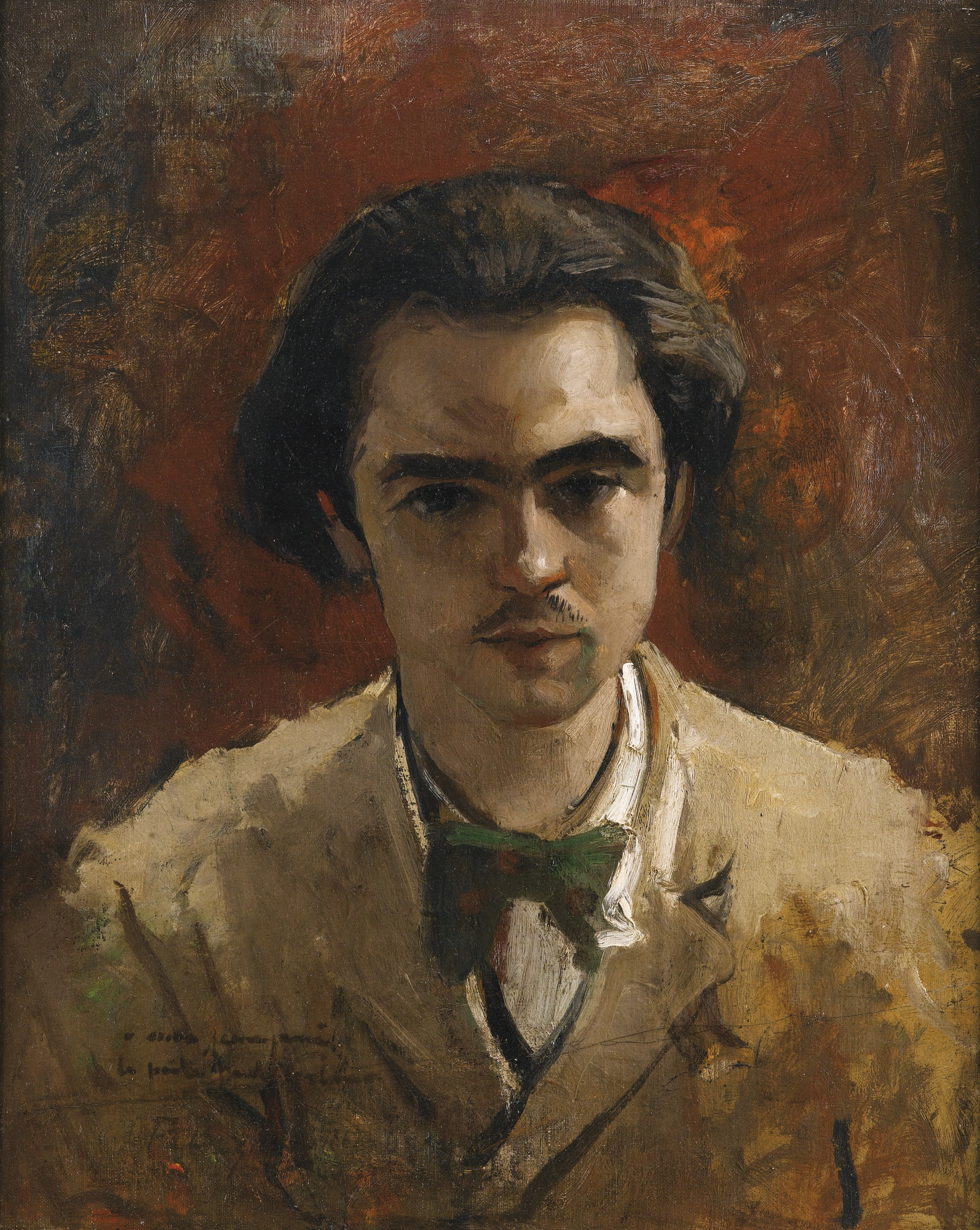
by Frédéric Bazille
1867

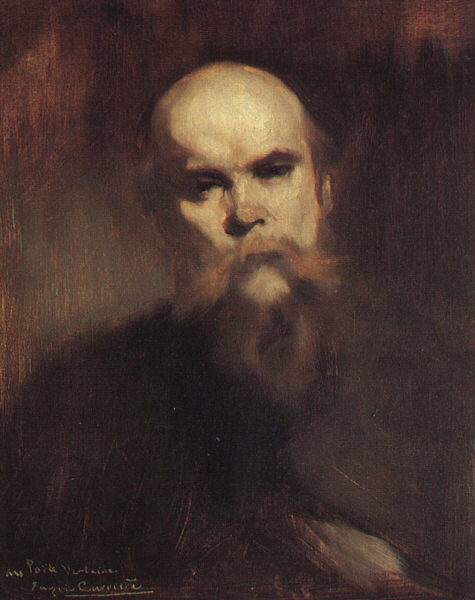
by Eugène Carrière
1890

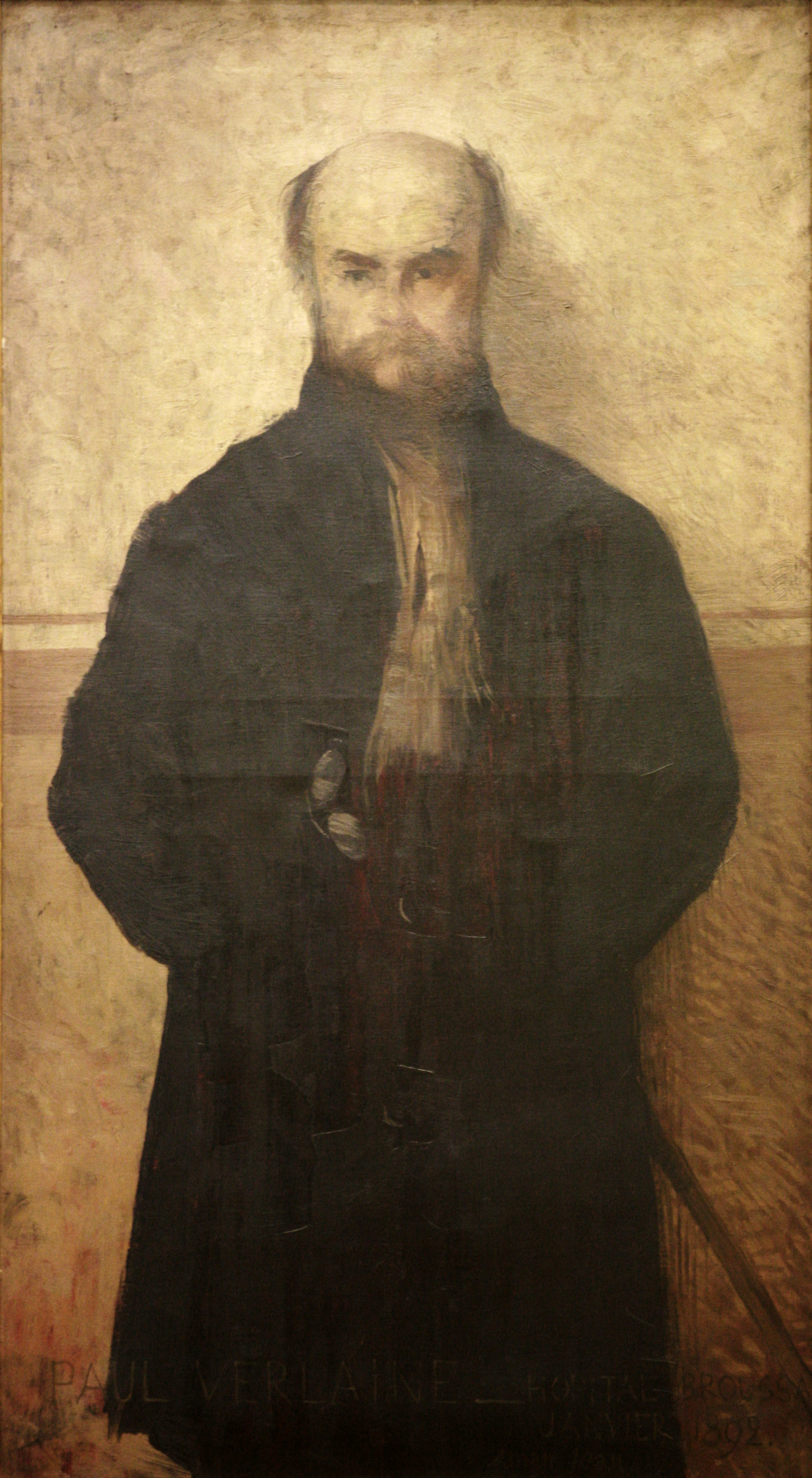
by Edmond Aman-Jean
1892

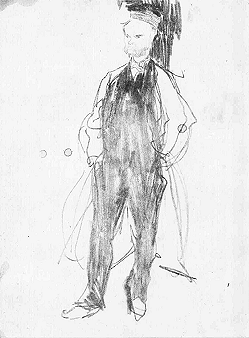
by Isaac Israëls
1892

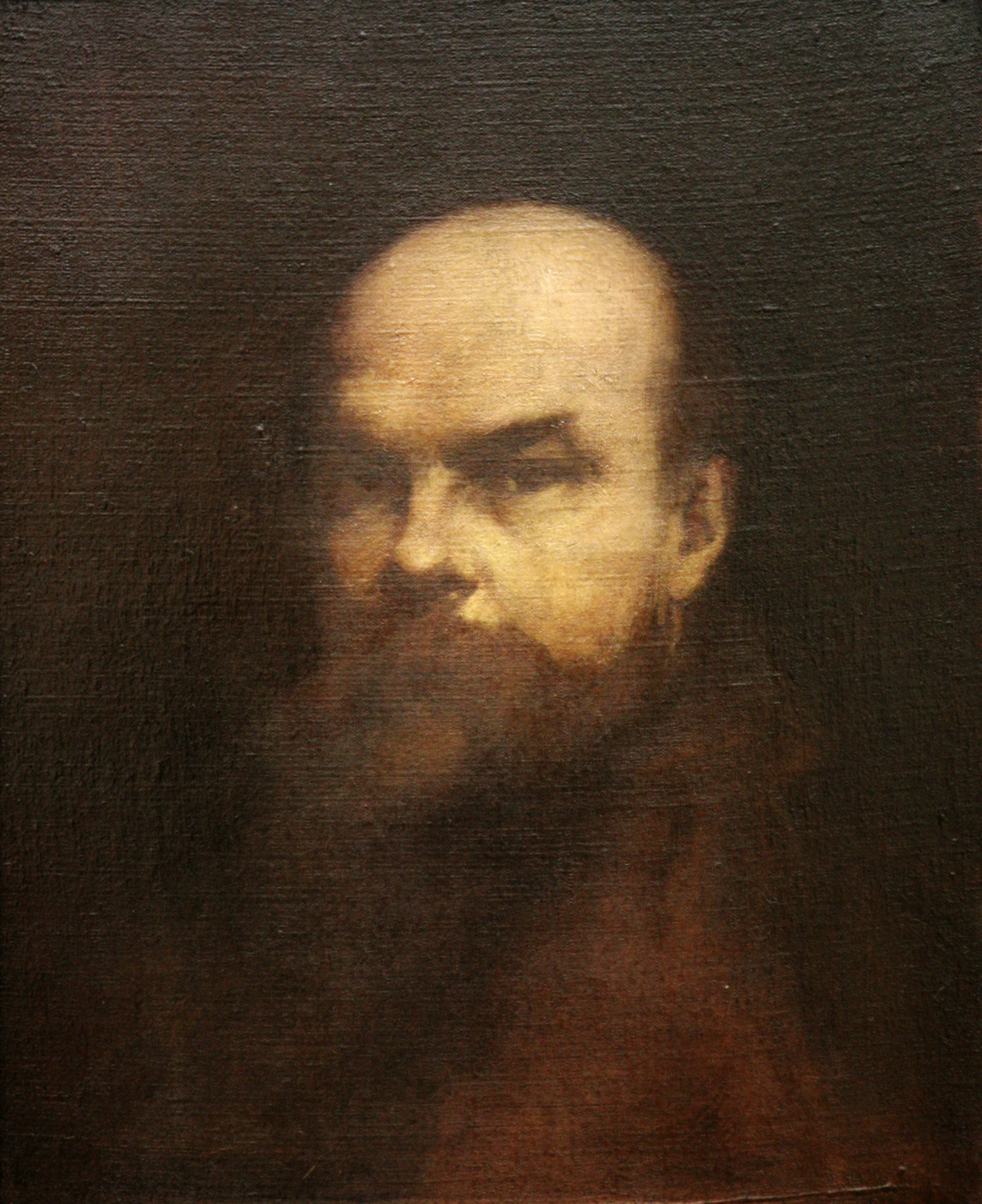
by Edouard Chantalat
1898
Posthumous,
from a photograph.

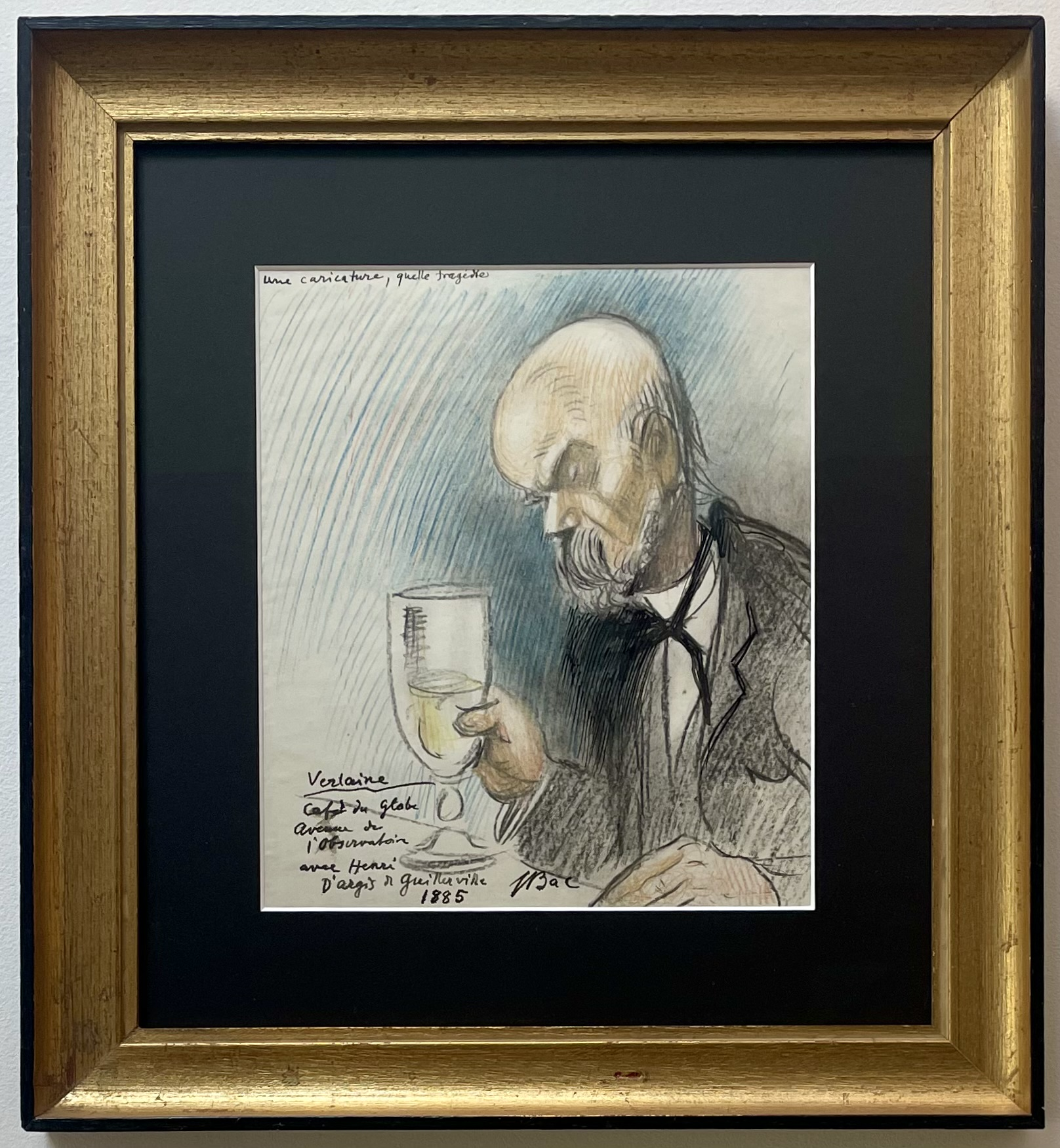
by Ferdinand Bac, 1885

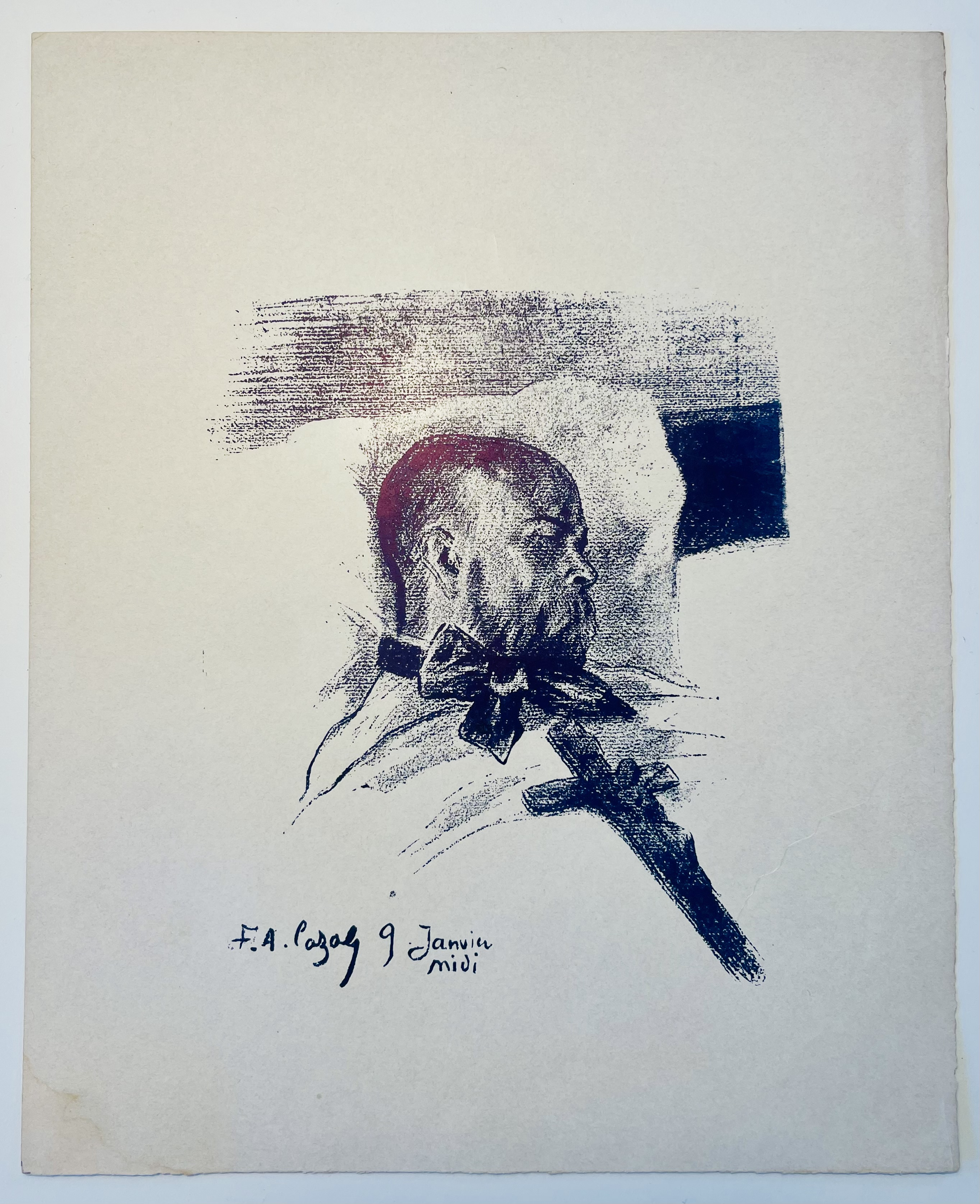
by Frédéric-Auguste Cazals, 1896

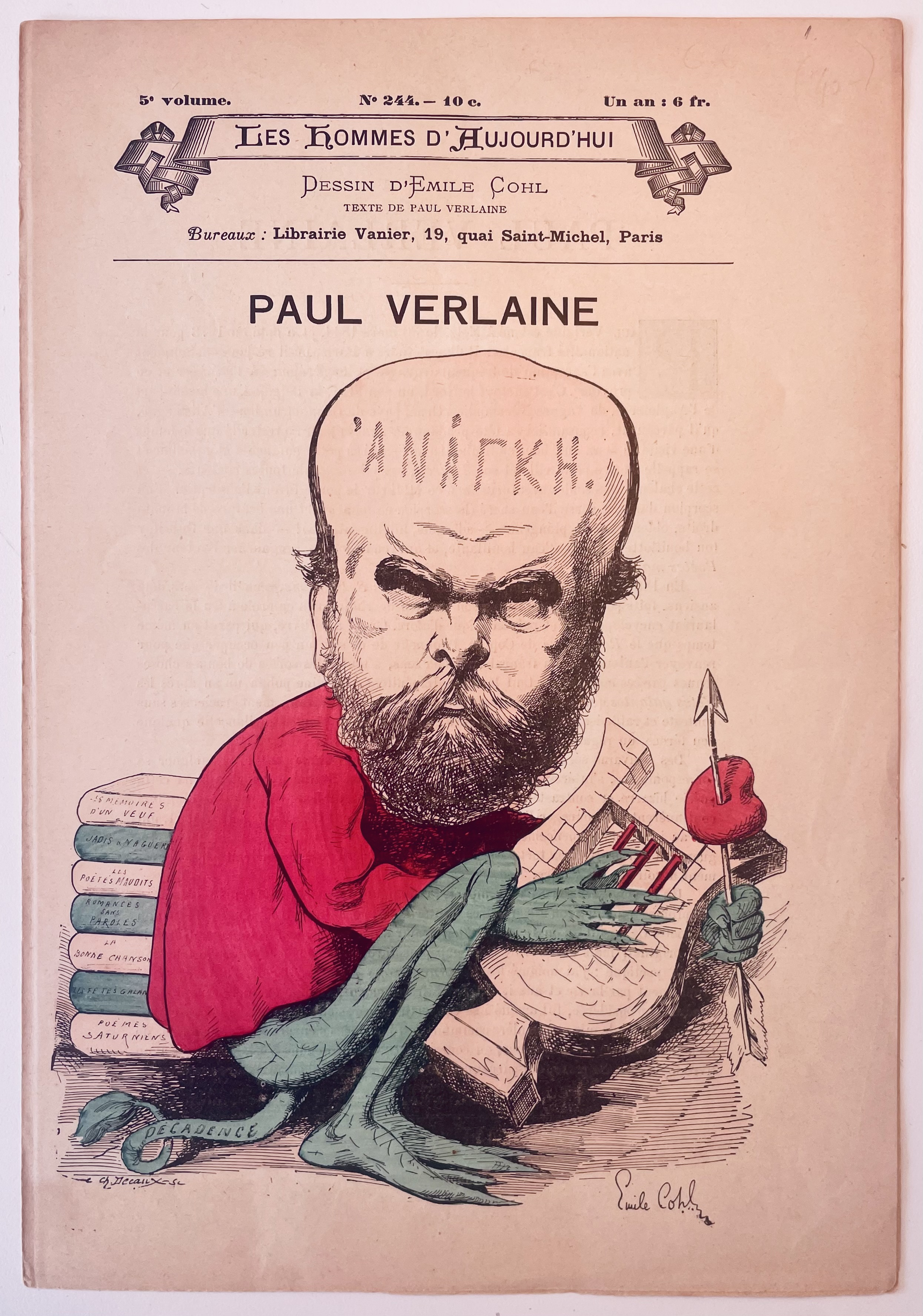
by Émile Cohl, 1896

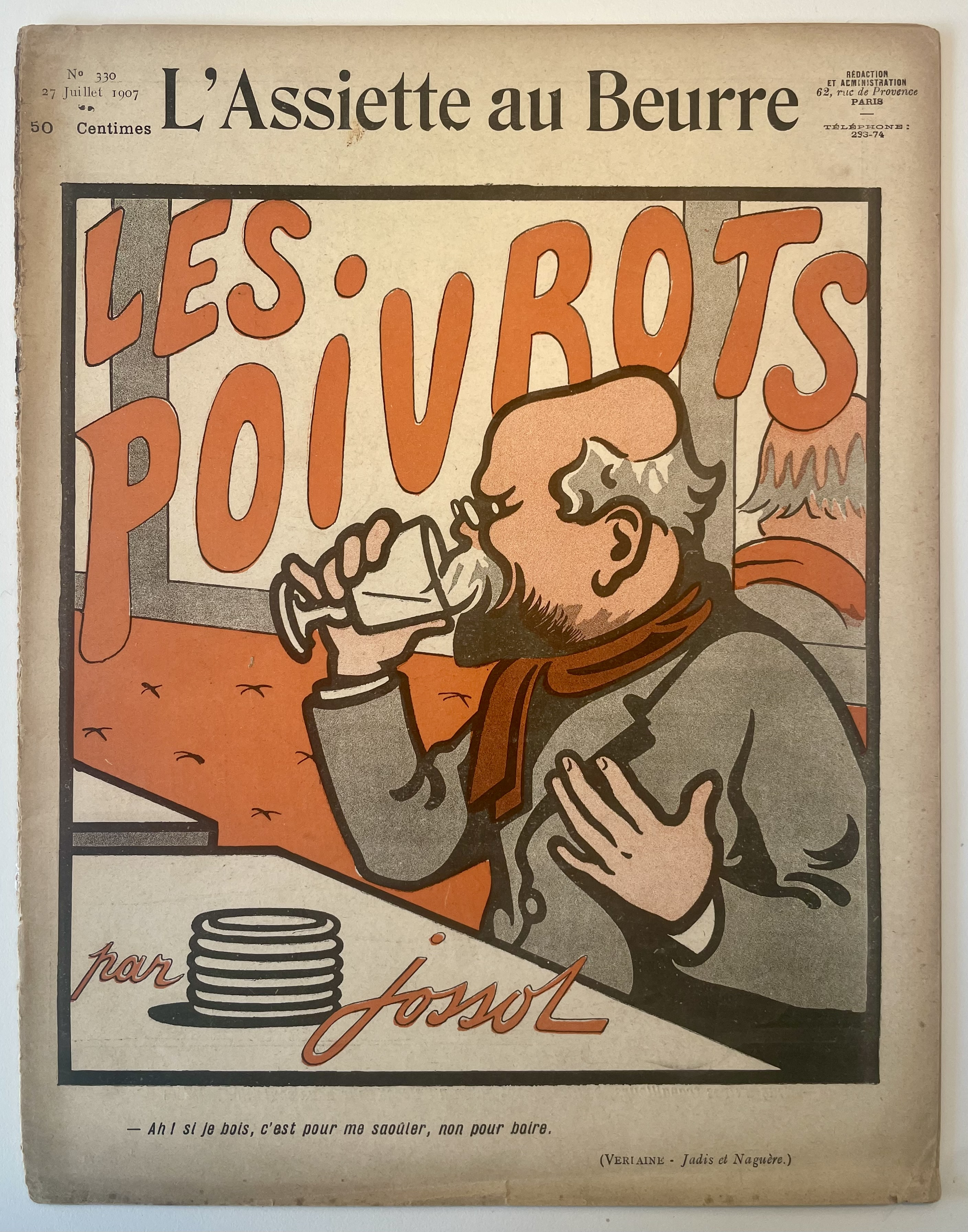
by Gustave-Henri Jossot, 1907

== Historical footnote ==
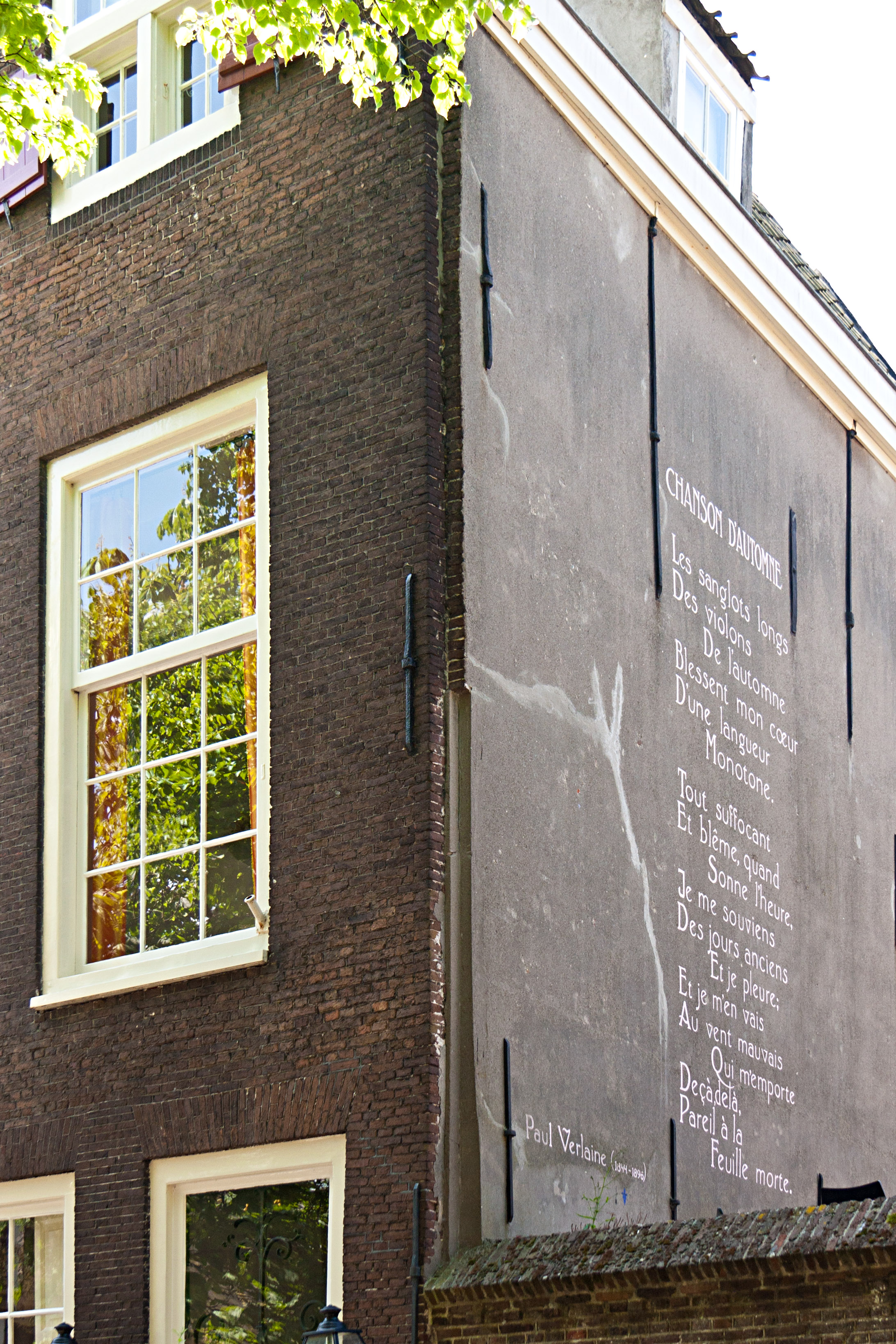
Verlaine's Chanson d'automne as a wall-poem in Leiden, Netherlands

- In preparation for Operation Overlord, the BBC via Radio Londres had signaled to the French Resistance that the opening lines of the 1866 Verlaine poem "Chanson d'automne" were to indicate the start of D-Day operations. The first three lines of the poem, "Les sanglots longs / Des violons / De l'automne" ("Long sobs of autumn violins"), meant that Operation Overlord was to start within two weeks. These lines were broadcast on 1 June 1944. The next set of lines, "Blessent mon coeur / D'une langueur / Monotone" ("wound my heart with a monotonous languor"), meant that it would start within 48 hours and that the resistance should begin sabotage operations especially on the French railroad system; these lines were broadcast on 5 June at 23:15.

== Legacy ==
Among the admirers of Verlaine's work was the Russian language poet and novelist Boris Pasternak. Pasternak went so far as to translate much of Verlaine's verse into Russian. According to Pasternak's mistress and muse, Olga Ivinskaya:

Whenever [Pasternak] was provided with literal versions of things which echoed his own thoughts or feelings, it made all the difference and he worked feverishly, turning them into masterpieces. I remember his translating Paul Verlaine in a burst of enthusiasm like this – L'Art poétique was after all an expression of his own beliefs about poetry.

=== Media portrayals ===
Verlaine's relationship with Rimbaud was dramatised in the 1964 Australian TV play A Season in Hell (portrayed by Alastair Duncan) the 1995 film Total Eclipse (portrayed by David Thewlis) based on Christopher Hampton's 1967 play of the same name. and Jessica Benhamou's 2025 film, Alchemy of the Word, starring James Craven as Rimbaud and Jordan Luke Gage as Verlaine. Author and musician Richard Hell drew inspiration from Verlaine and Rimbaud's relationship for his 2005 novel Godlike. Also, a duo of characters named after Paul Verlaine and Arthur Rimbaud appear in Kafka Asagiri's manga series Bungo Stray Dogs, although Rimbaud is already dead by the time of the main setting, and Verlaine only appears in person quite late on, having secluded himself in his basement after Rimbaud's death.

=== Musical adaptations ===
Later musical settings of Verlaine's works include:

- Cécile Paul Simon: "L'heure Exquise" (1907)
- Lyubov Streicher: Romances
- Denise Roger: Soleils Couchants (1963)
- Beatrice Siegrist: Soleils Couchants (1963)
- Léo Ferré: Verlaine et Rimbaud (1964)
- Marc Almond and Michael Cashmore: Crime of Love (2011, on Feasting with Panthers)
- John Pickard: Verlaine Songs (2020)

== Works in French (original) ==
Verlaine's Complete Works (Œuvres complètes) are available in critical editions from the Bibliothèque de la Pléiade.

- Libretti for Vaucochard et Fils 1^{er} and Fisch-Ton-Kan (1864) (music by Emmanuel Chabrier)
- Poèmes saturniens (1866)
- Les Amies (1867)
- "Clair de Lune" (1869)
- Fêtes galantes (1869)
- La Bonne Chanson (1870)
- Romances sans paroles (1874)
- Cellulairement (1875; published posthumously in 2013)
- Sagesse (1880)
- Voyage en France par un Français (1881)
- Les Poètes maudits (1884)
- Jadis et naguère (1884)
- Les Mémoires d'un veuf (1886)
- Amour (1888)
- À Louis II de Bavière (1888)
- Parallèlement (1889)
- Dédicaces (1890)
- Femmes (1890)
- Hombres (1891)
- Bonheur (1891)
- Mes hôpitaux (1891)
- Chansons pour elle (1891)
- Liturgies intimes (1892)
- Mes prisons (1893)
- Élégies (1893)
- Odes en son honneur (1893)
- Dans les limbes (1894)
- Épigrammes (1894)
- Confessions (1895)

== Works in English (translation) ==
Although widely regarded as a major French poet, having been elected Prince of Poets towards the end of his life, very few of Verlaine's major works have been translated in their entirety (as opposed to selections therefrom) into English.

French Title (Original)	English Title	Genre	Publisher, etc.
La Bonne Chanson	The Good Song	Poetry	Sunny Lou Publishing, 2022. Translated by Richard Robinson. ISBN 978-1-95539-228-0
Chansons pour elle	Songs for Her & Odes in Her Honor	Poetry	Sunny Lou Publishing, 2021. Translated by Richard Robinson. ISBN 978-1-73547-767-1
Fêtes galantes	Fêtes Galantes & Songs Without Words	Poetry	Sunny Lou Publishing, 2022. Translated by Richard Robinson. ISBN 978-1-95539-220-4
Odes en son honneur	Songs for Her & Odes in Her Honor	Poetry	Sunny Lou Publishing, 2021. Translated by Richard Robinson. ISBN 978-1-73547-767-1
Poèmes saturniens	Poems Under Saturn	Poetry	Princeton University Press, 2011. Translated by Karl Kirchwey. ISBN 978-0-69114-486-3
Romances sans paroles	Songs Without Words	Poetry	Omnidawn, 2013. Translated by Donald Revell. ISBN 978-1-89065-087-2
Mes hôpitaux	My Hospitals & My Prisons	Autobiography	Sunny Lou Publishing, 2020. Translated by Richard Robinson. ISBN 978-1-73547-760-2
Mes prisons	My Hospitals & My Prisons	Autobiography	Sunny Lou Publishing, 2020. Translated by Richard Robinson. ISBN 978-1-73547-760-2
Cellulairement	Cellulely	Poetry	Sunny Lou Publishing, 2020. Translated by Richard Robinson. ISBN 978-1-73547-764-0
Femmes/Hombres	Women/Men	Poetry	Anvil Press Poetry Ltd, 1979. Translated by Alistair Elliot. ISBN 978-0856460449
Voyage en France par un Français	Voyage in France by a Frenchman	Poetry	Sunny Lou Publishing, 2021. Translated by Richard Robinson. ISBN 978-1-95539-215-0

== See also ==
- Rimbaud and Verlaine Foundation
- Poète maudit
- Zutiste
- Total Eclipse
