= Alice de Chambrier =

Swiss poet (1861–1882)

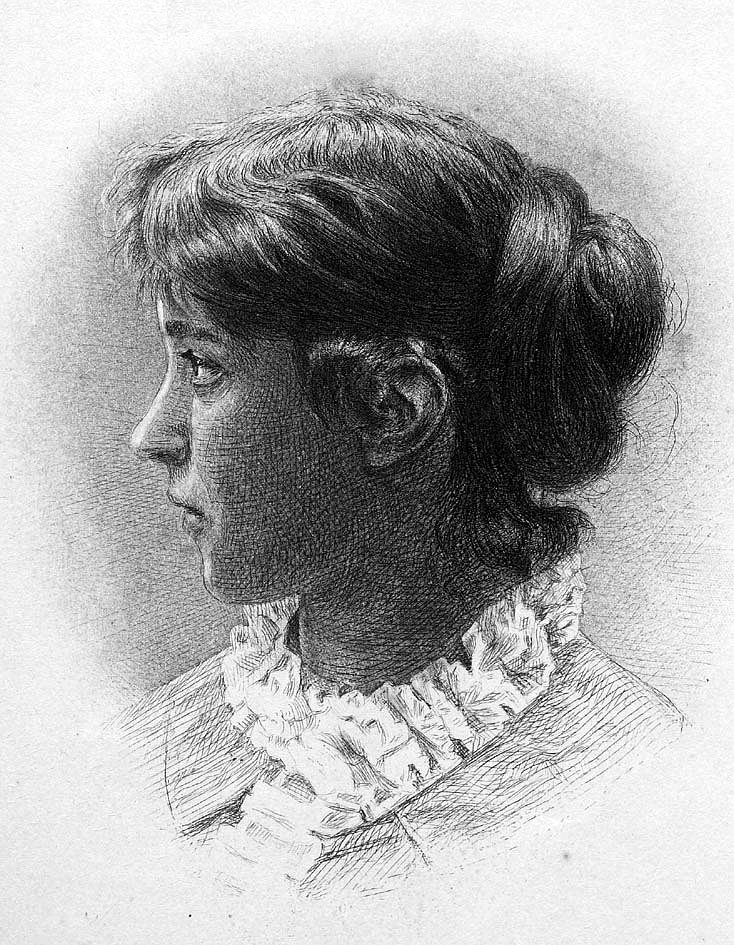
- Born: 28 September 1861; Neuchâtel, Switzerland
- Died: 20 December 1882 (aged 21); Neuchâtel, Switzerland
- Occupation: Poet
- Writing career
- Notable work: Au-delà
- Literary movement: Romanticism

Alice de Chambrier (28 September 1861 – 20 December 1882) was a Swiss poet. She is best known for Au-delà, an anthology of poems.

== Biography ==
Alice de Chambrier was born on 28 September 1861 in Neuchâtel, to Alfred de Chambrier and Sophie de Sandol-Roy. Her mother died before de Chambrier turned one year old, and she grew up in Neuchâtel with her father. When she was fifteen she moved to Darmstadt where she remained in the years between 1876 and 1877. While there she learned German and began composing poetry in German.

She wrote her first work at age 17. She attended a girls' school, called l'Ecole Supérieure des Jeunes Demoiselles, where her first compositions acquired some popularity. Her poem the Atlandide about the lost continent called Atlantis was recited in a public performance, by the actress Madame Ernst.

She received invaluable guidance from Madame Berton, née Samson, the daughter of the renowned tragedian, and from the actress Mme Agar (Marie-Léonide Charvin), celebrated for her performances in Racine's Phèdre and Andromaque. The teaching set up the young actress's career.

She wrote a number of works, not only poems, but also comedies, dramas, and short stories. She won a lot of awards in various contests, the first of all in 1880 for the 'Phare de Cordouan' at the Académie des Muses Santones, in Rouen. She also gained a primevère d'argent during the spring of 1882 from the Académie des Jeux floraux in Toulouse for her ballad La Belle au Bois dormant (the sleeping beauty), but was so shy that she could not read it in public.

She did not read many books, some magazines, a few historical books, and 'La Légende des siècles' by Victor Hugo.

Chambrier resolved that she would not publish a book until she was thirty years old and her work was not publicly known while she was alive. Her literary mentor was Philippe Godet, and she had submitted her work to him.

She died on 20 December 1882. The introduction to Au-delà, written by Godet, who was present at her death, describes the deterioration of her health: "Falling ill following a chill, on Saturday December 16th 1882, she did not interrupt her furious work for a moment. On Sunday she was still chatting with a friend and forming travel plans: she was speaking of undertaking nothing less than a voyage around the globe. Her condition ... aggravated after noon on Monday, and after having dedicated long hours to retouching and recopying her poem on Lamartine, she had to resign herself to going to bed. On Tuesday, she was still correcting her drafts for M. Imer at three in the afternoon ... At five, the agony had begun; she expired without suffering the next morning."

== Major works ==
- Atlantide, May 1880
- Belladonna, in Trois Nouvelles : Verena, Belladonna, Cendrillon, par M. S. Framel, Alice de Chambrier et F. Guillemet, Lausanne, Arthur Imer, 1882
- Au-delà, 1883
- Le Chatelard de Bevaix dans le Musée neuchâtelois, 1884.
- Œuvres poétiques, Neuchâtel, éditions de la Baconnière, 1972
- Sibylle ou le Chatelard de Bevaix, Genève, 1983
- Légendes et récits, Liminaire, Genève, 1990
- Poèmes choisis, Lausanne, éditions L'Âge d'Homme, 1998
- Oh ! Laissez-moi chanter..., 2004

== Bibliography ==
- Henry Barbier, Alice de Chambrier et son œuvre littéraire, éd. Cahors, 1937, 24 p. (In-8°)
- Service pour la promotion de l'égalité entre homme et femme, Pionnières et créatrices en Suisse romande, XIX^{e} et XX^{e} siècles, Genève, Slatkine, 2004
