= Sextet =

Musical group that consists of 6 people

A sextet (or hexad) is a formation containing exactly six members. The former term is commonly associated with vocal ensembles (e.g. The King's Singers, Affabre Concinui) or musical instrument groups, but can be applied to any situation where six similar or related objects are considered a single unit.

Musical compositions with six parts are sextets. Many musical compositions are named for the number of musicians for which they are written. If a piece is written for six performers, it may be called a "sextet". Steve Reich's "Sextet", for example, is written for six percussionists. However, much as many string quartets do not include "string quartet" in the title (though many do), many sextets do not include "sextet" in their title. See: string sextet and piano sextet.

In jazz music a sextet is any group of six players, usually containing a drum set (bass drum, snare drum, hi-hat, ride cymbal), string bass or electric bass, piano, and various combinations of the following or other instruments: guitar, trumpet, saxophone, clarinet, trombone.

In heavy metal and rock music, a sextet typically contains, but is not restricted to, a lead vocalist, two guitarists, a bassist, drummer, and keyboardist.

== In classical music ==
- Antonín Dvořák
  - String Sextet in A major
- Pyotr Ilyich Tchaikovsky
  - Souvenir de Florence
- Lennox Berkeley
  - Sextet for Clarinet, Horn, and String Quartet
- John Ireland
  - Sextet for Clarinet, Horn, and String Quartet
- Francis Poulenc
  - Sextet for Flute, Oboe, Clarinet, Bassoon, Horn, and Piano
- Ernst von Dohnányi
  - Sextet for Clarinet, Horn, String Trio, and Piano
- Krzysztof Penderecki
  - Sextet for Clarinet, Horn, String Trio, and Piano
