= List of major/minor compositions =

Major/minor compositions are musical compositions that begin in a major key and end in a minor key (generally the parallel minor), specifying the keynote (as C major/minor). This is a very unusual form in tonal music, although examples became more common in the nineteenth century. There are far fewer major/minor compositions than minor/major ones (the latter category of which includes, but is not limited to, all minor-key works that end with a Picardy third, as well as many Classical- and Romantic-period symphonies, concertos, sonatas and chamber works, and individual movements thereof.)

The major/minor compositions in the following lists do not necessarily end with a minor chord; a final passage in minor ending with a sonority that fails to re-establish the major mode (for example, an open octave or fifth) is sufficient.

Works falling into the following categories are excluded:

- Compositions that would be major/minor but for a final Picardy third stipulated by the composer, such as Bach's Darzu ist erschienen der Sohn Gottes, BWV 40, Francis Poulenc's Vinea mea electa from Quatre motets pour un temps de pénitence (FP 97), or Felix Mendelssohn's Piano Sextet, Op. 110;
- Compositions that would be major/minor, but end inconclusively on the major dominant of the final minor key, e.g. Nos. 2 and 9 of Robert Schumann's Kerner cycle, Op. 35, or Schumann's Die Nonne, Op. 49 No. 3;
- Compositions in which the beginning only hints at a possible reading of a major key without really establishing it, such as the Brahms Clarinet Quintet, Haydn's two string quartets, Op. 33 No. 1 and Op. 64 No. 2, C. P. E. Bach's Piano Sonata, Wq. 55/3, or the first movement of Alkan's Grande sonate 'Les quatre âges' (all of which are in B minor, but start with the possibility of D major);
- Compositions in which the opening major chord merely serves a function (e.g. dominant or Neapolitan) in the ensuing minor key, without being tonicized in its own right, such as Saint-Saëns' Danse macabre or Chopin's first Ballade;
- Compositions that are only incidentally major/minor due to being unfinished, without any indication that the composer intended them to be major/minor, such as Schubert's Piano Sonata in C, D. 840 or Haydn's String Quartet in D minor, Op. 103;
- Frequently performed portions of a larger work consisting of what is technically two separate movements, if the first of these finishes clearly on the tonic (and thus doesn't require continuation), such as the opening pair of movements in Beethoven's Piano Sonata Op. 109 (connected by an attacca);
- Entire extended works as song cycles, ballets, operas and oratorios that finish in a different tonic than the starting one, unless the two keys carry clear extramusical or programmatic connotions within the work (an explanation of which must accompany any such listings below).

== Major/minor compositions retaining the keynote ==
=== Single works and miniatures ===
- Alkan – Chant d'amour - chant de mort, Op. 35 No. 10 (G♭-f♯)
- Alkan – Esquisse, Op. 63 No. 7 "Le frisson" (F♯)
- Alkan – Prière Op. 64 No. 10 (B♭)
- Allen – Girl of the Orient (F)
- Bax – The Devil that Tempted St. Anthony (F)
- Beethoven – Klage, WoO 113 (E)
- Brahms – Jägerlied, Op. 66/4 (C)
- Brahms – Rhapsody Op. 119 No. 4 in E♭
- Busoni – Sonatina No. 6 in A, BV 284 (A)
- Campra – Cari Zephiri volate (A)
- Campra – Quis ego Domine (A)
- Catoire – Prelude Op. 17 No. 4 (B♭)
- Cavallini – Caprice for clarinet Op. 4 No. 4 (E)
- Chopin – Nocturne Op. 32 No. 1 in B (final chord sometimes changed to major)
- Coste – Le Départ, Op. 31 (E)
- Couperin - Le Dodo, ou l'amour au Berçeau, from Pieces de Clavecin (A)
- de Curtis – Torna a Surriento (E) (only if the chorus is used as an instrumental introduction, as done in the widely-performed arrangement by Giancarlo Chiaramello)
- Duparc – La Vie antérieure, melody (E flat)
- Duparc – Lénore, symphonic poem (G)
- Fibich – Malířské Studie (Studies on Painters), No. 2, Spor Masopustu s Postem (The Fight Between Carnival and Lent) in C
- Franck – Fantaisie in A, from Trois Pièces for organ (1878) (A)
- Franck – Le Chasseur maudit, symphonic poem (G)
- Fuchs – Andante grazioso and Capriccio Op. 63 (A major and minor respectively)
- Graener – Theodor-Storm-Musik Op.93 (A)
- Harris – Symphony No. 3 (G)
- Heidrich – Variations on "Happy Birthday" (C)
- Heinrich – The President's Funeral March (E)
- Karłowicz – Stanisław i Anna Oświecimowie, Op. 12 (B)
- Kuhlau – Introduction and Variations for flute and piano Op. 99 (A)
- Lalo – Fantaisie norvégienne in A
- Lecuona – La 32, No. 6 of Siete Danzas Cubanas Tipicas (G♭-f♯)
- Levy – Tango Brasileiro (A) (reverse Picardy third)
- MacDowell – Witch, Op. 38 No. 4 (F)
- Mendelssohn – Andante Cantabile e Presto Agitato in B
- Mendelssohn – Capriccio brillante for piano and orchestra in B, Op. 22
- Mendelssohn – Capriccio in E, Op. 118 (1837)
- Mendelssohn – Capriccio, MWV U 43 (E♭)
- Mendelssohn – Characteristic Piece Op. 7 No. 7 in E (reverse Picardy third)
- Mendelssohn – Rondo capriccioso in E, Op. 14
- de Momigny – La Nouvelle Valentine (A)
- Moniuszko – Magda Karczmarka, No. 20 from Śpiewnik domowy Vol. 2 (B♭)
- Moniuszko – Do Niemna, No. 4 from Śpiewnik domowy Vol. 6 (E)
- Mozart – Violin Sonata in A, K. 402/385e (completed by Maximilian Stadler; the work has only one movement)
- Poulenc – Nocturne, FP 56 No. 6 (G)
- Poulenc – Amoureuses, FP 77 No. 5 (F)
- Praeger – Rhapsody No. 2 in F
- Purcell – Awake, ye dead, Z. 182 (C)
- Purcell – The earth trembled, Z. 197 (A)
- Purcell – Love arms himself in Celia's eyes, Z. 392 (C)
- Purcell – Oh! fair Cedaria, Z. 402 (C) (some performances add a Picardy third)
- Purcell – This poet sings the Trojan wars (Anacreon's defeat), Z. 423 (C)
- Rachmaninoff – K Djétjam (To the Children), Op. 26 No. 7, from "Fifteen Romances" of Op.26 (F)
- Reicha – L'Art de Varier, Op. 57 (F)
- Reicha – Fugue, Op. 36 No. 32 (E♭)
- Rheinberger – Toccata Op. 12 (G)
- Satie – Gymnopédie No. 1 (D)
- A. Scarlatti – Se Florindo e fedele (A♭) (ends on an open octave in an A♭ minor context)
- D. Scarlatti – Keyboard Sonata K. 63 (L. 84) in G ("Capriccio") (ending sometimes changed to major)
- D. Scarlatti – Keyboard Sonata K. 107 (L. 474) in F
- D. Scarlatti – Keyboard Sonata K. 140 (L. 107) in D (ends on an open octave in a D minor context)
- D. Scarlatti – Keyboard Sonata K. 182 (L. 139) in A
- D. Scarlatti – Keyboard Sonata K. 206 (L. 257) in E
- D. Scarlatti – Keyboard Sonata K. 297 (L.S. 19) in F
- Scriabin – Mazurka in F (1889)
- Schubert – Impromptu Op. 90 No. 2 in E♭
- Schubert – Moment Musical No. 6 in A♭ (ends on an open octave in an A♭ minor context)
- Schubert – Am Bach im Frühling, D. 361 (D♭-c♯)
- Schubert – An den Mond, D. 468 (A)
- Schubert – Tränenregen (No. 10 of Die Schöne Müllerin) (A)
- Schubert – Die böse Farbe (No. 17 of Die Schöne Müllerin) (B)
- Schubert – Lied eines Kriegers, D. 822 (A)
- Schubert – Frühlingstraum (No. 11 of Winterreise) (A)
- C. Schumann – Romance, op. 5 no. 3 (B)
- C. Schumann or Friedrich Wieck – Der Wanderer in der Sägemühle (C)
- R. Schumann – No. 17 of Davidsbündlertänze, Opus 6 (B)
- R. Schumann – Der Handschuh, Op. 87 (D)
- Sibelius – Impromptu, Opus 5 No. 6 in E
- Sibelius – Flickan kom ifrån sin älsklings möte, melody op. 37 nº5 (D flat-c sharp)
- Sibelius – Valse triste, op. 44 no. 1 (G)
- Sibelius – Winter Scene, No. 2 from 5 Esquisses Op. 114 (A)
- Soler – Keyboard Sonata R. 6 in F
- Strauss – Don Juan, Op. 20 (E)
- Tchaikovsky – To Forget So Soon, TH 94 (F)
- Tchaikovsky – Valse-Scherzo Op. 7 in A
- Voříšek – Fantasia for piano, Op. 12 (C)

=== Movements from larger works ===
- Arriaga – Symphony in D major, i (ends on an open octave in a D minor context)
- Beethoven – Piano trio No. 6 (Op. 70 No. 2) in E♭ major, ii (C)
- Beethoven – Violin Sonata No. 9, "Kreutzer", i (A)
- Beethoven – Piano Quartet No. 1 in E♭ WoO 36, i (and ii) (E♭) (although sometimes construed as two separate movements, they are not really separable as the first ends with a half-cadence leading into the second)
- Lennox Berkeley – Three Pieces for solo clarinet, iii (G)
- Norbert Burgmüller – Symphony No.2, Op. 11, iii (D)
- Catalani – La Wally, "Ebben, ne andrò lontana" (E)
- Chausson – Piano Trio in G minor, iv (G)
- Chausson - Piano Quartet in A major opus 30, ii (D flat/ c sharp)
- Chausson – Poème de l'amour et de la mer, i (G)
- Couperin – Pieces de clavecin, Troisieme livre, "L'enjouée" (G)
- Cui – In modo populari (Petite suite): Petite Suite No. 3, Op. 43, vi (Vivace, ma non troppo) (G) (returns to theme of first movement in G minor and ends there)
- Dvořák – Piano Trio ("Dumky") Op. 90 in E minor, v (E♭)
- Fitelberg – Violin Sonata Op. 12, i (F)
- Fuchs – String Trio Op. 61/1, i (E)
- Graener – Symphony in D Op. 39, iii (D)
- Grieg – Sigurd Jorsalfar (incidental music), iii ("Ved mannjevningen") (A)
- Gouvy – Petite Suite Galoise Op. 90, i (G)
- Handel – Jephtha, "All That Is in Hamor Mine" (G)
- Handel – Messiah, "All We Like Sheep" (F)
- Handel – Serse, "Per dar fine alla mia pena" (G)
- Kabalevsky – Piano Sonata No. 2, i (E♭)
- Lalo – Symphonie espagnole, Opus 21, ii (G)
- Lalo – Symphony in G Minor, ii (scherzo) (E)
- Lazzari – String Quartet in A minor Op. 17, iv (A)
- MacDowell – Piano sonata No. 3, Op.57, iii (D)
- Magnard - Piano Trio Op.18, ii (D flat / c sharp)
- Mahler - Symphony No.7, ii (debatable, but basically a C major movement ending in c)
- Marais – Sonata à la Marésienne (La Gamme et Autres Morceaux de Simphonie 1723), iii (C)
- Marpurg – Cinqième Suite de Pièces de Clavecin, v (G)
- Mayer – Symphony No. 7, iv (F)
- Medtner – Sonata-Ballade Op. 27, i (F♯) (Note: This movement was originally intended to be a stand-alone "Ballade".)
- Mendelssohn – String Quartet Op. 13, i (A)
- Mendelssohn – String Symphony No. 11, i (F)
- Mendelssohn – Symphony No.5, Op.107 ("Reformation"), i (D)
- Mozart – The Magic Flute, Quintet (Wie? Wie? Wie? Ihr an diesem Schreckensort?), Act II (G)
- Mozart – Sonata for Violin and Piano K. 379, i (G)
- Mozart – Overture-Allemande (both movements played without pause) from Suite, K. 399/385i (C)
- Myaskovsky – Symphony No. 25 Op. 69, i (D♭-c♯)
- Poulenc – Cello Sonata FP 143, i (E)
- Poulenc – Concert champêtre for Harpsichord and Orchestra, iii (D)
- Poulenc – Oboe Sonata FP 185, ii (B♭)
- Poulenc – Un soir de neige FP 126, iv. La nuit le froid la solitude (E♭)
- Reicha – Flute Quartet Op. 98 No. 6, iv (G)
- Ries – Piano Concerto No. 3 in C♯ minor, Op. 55, iii (C♯)
- Rimsky-Korsakov - Symphony No. 3 Op. 32, i (C)
- Sibelius – Symphony No. 4 in A minor, Op. 63, iv (A)
- Stöhr – Piano Trio in A minor Op. 100, iv (revised version only; first version remains in major to the end)
- Szymanowski – Fantasy Op. 14, ii (A♭)
- Tchaikovsky – Piano Trio in A minor, Op. 50, iiB (A)
- Vivaldi – Concerto for Strings & Continuo in G, R151 ("Alla Rustica"), i (G)
- Verdi – Rigoletto, Finale (D♭/c#)
- Verdi – La Traviata, Finale (D♭, with a reverse picardy third)
- Weinberg – String Quartet No. 4 in E♭, Op. 20, iv (E♭)

=== Works in several movements ===
- Aimon – String Quartet Op. 7 (E)
- Alfvén – Symphony No. 2 in D, Op. 11
- Alkan – Sonate de Concert for Cello and Piano in E, Op. 47
- Andrée – String Quartet (1861) (A)
- Beethoven – Sonata quasi una fantasia, Biamonti 213 (D)
- Boccherini – Guitar Quintet "Fandango" in D major, G. 448
- Boieldieu – Harp Concerto in C
- Brahms – Piano Trio No. 1 in B, Op. 8 (both versions)
- Campra - Idoménée (B♭)
- Couperin – Troisième Concert from Concerts Royaux (A)
- Couperin – Ordre 12ème de clavecin (E)
- Devienne – Flute Concerto No. 12 in A
- Dvořák – Czech Suite in D, Op. 39
- Frey – Cello Sonata Op. 8 (B)
- Fuchs – Piano Sonata Op. 19 (G♭-f♯)
- Fuchs – String Quartet Op. 58 (E)
- Fuchs – String Trio Op. 61/1 (E)
- Gigout – Deux Interludes pour orgue ou harmonium (C)
- Godard – String Quartet No. 2, Op. 37 (A)
- Godowsky - Suite for the Left Hand Alone (D)
- Handel – Concerto Grosso Op. 3 No. 6 in D
- Hartmann – Serenade Op. 24 (A)
- Hessen - Quintet Op. 25 (C)
- Hummel – Cello Sonata Op. 104 in A
- Jacquet de La Guerre – Suite No.2 from Pièces de clavecin qui peuvent se jouer sur le violon (G)
- Krehl - String Quartet in A major, Op. 17 (A)
- Lalo – Concerto Russe, Op. 29 in G
- Marpurg – Troisième Suite de Pièces de Clavecin (C)
- Marpurg – Cinqième Suite de Pièces de Clavecin (G)
- Mendelssohn – String Symphony No. 11 (F)
- Mendelssohn – Symphony No. 4 in A, "Italian"
- Mendelssohn – Suite in G MWV Z1/105-108
- Myaskovsky – Divertimento Op. 80 (E♭)
- Nielsen – Hagbarth and Signe: Music for Adam Oehlenschläger's Play (D♭-c♯)
- Norman – String Quartet Op. 20 (E)
- Novák – String Quartet Op. 22 (G)
- O'Kelly – Piano Trio Op. 15 (G)
- Palmgren – Impromptu and Scherzo Op. 10 (D♭-c♯)
- Pescetti – Harpsichord Sonata No. 4 (A)
- Poulenc – Sonata for clarinet and bassoon in D, FP 32a
- Rachmaninoff – Suite for Two Pianos No. 2 in C
- Rameau – Suite in G from Nouvelles Pièces de clavecin, RCT 6
- Reicha – Flute Quartet Op. 98 No. 6 (G)
- Ries – Cello Sonata Op. 21 in A
- Rosenhain – Cello Sonata Op. 38 (E)
- Schäfer – Cello Sonata Op. 13 (C)
- P. Scharwenka – 2 Tanz-Impromptus Op. 86 (F♯)
- Scott – Symphony No. 1 of 1899 (G)
- Sgambati – String Quartet Op. 12 or Op. 17 (D♭-c♯)
- Shostakovich – String Quartet No. 2 in A, Op. 68
- Smith – Ouverture-Suite in G
- Spendiarov – Esquisses de la Crimée Op.23 (G)
- Steibelt – Violin Sonata Op. 69 (G)
- Stöhr – Violin Sonata No. 1, Op. 27 (G)
- Stöhr – Violin Sonata No. 7, Op. 107 (E)
- Stöhr – Violin Sonata No. 15, Op. 134b (B♭)
- Taneyev – String Quintet No. 2 in C, Op. 16
- Voříšek – Violin Sonata in G, Op. 5
- G. Weber – Keyboard Sonata in C, Op. 15
- Walter – Violin Sonata in A, 1908
- Weinberg – String Quartet No. 4 in E♭, Op. 20

== Major/minor works changing the keynote ==
- Albéniz – Córdoba, No. 4 of Cantos de España, Opus 232 (F-d)
- Alkan – Prière, Op. 66 No. 7 (C-a)
- Bernstein – Chichester Psalms (B♭-g)
- Berlioz – Requiem (Grande Messe des Morts), Op. 5, viii, Hostias (G-b♭)
- Bizet – Symphony in C major, ii (F-a)
- Claude Bolling – Suite for Flute and Jazz Piano Trio (G-c)
- Brahms – Du mein einzig Licht, WoO 33 No. 37 (A-f♯)
- Brahms – Vom Strande, Op. 69 No. 6 (F-a)
- Chausson – Poème de l'amour et de la mer (G-d)
- Chausson – Poème de l'amour et de la mer, ii (actually the third movement, counting an unnumbered interlude) (E-d)
- Chopin – Ballade No. 2 (F-a)
- Couperin – Ordre 25ème de clavecin (E♭-c)
- Czerny - Etude op.365 no.7 (A♭-c)
- Czerny - Etude op.365 no.14 (A-c♯)
- Debussy – Suite bergamasque (F-f♯)
- Dvořák – The Noon Witch (C-a)
- Enescu – Cantabile e Presto for flute and piano, 1904 (E♭-g)
- Enescu – Nocturne e Saltarello for cello and piano, 1897 (F-a)
- Finzi – Childhood Among the Ferns (E♭-b♭)
- Fuchs – Serenade in D Op. 9, ii (B♭-g)
- Godowsky – "Paradoxical Moods", No. 3 from Triakontameron (E-c♯)
- Handel – Belshazzar, Chorus of Babylonians: "Ye tutelar gods of our empire, look down" (G-e)
- Handel – Concerto Grosso Op. 3 No. 1 (B♭-g)
- Handel – Suite for Harpsichord No. 2 in F, HWV 427, i (F-a)
- Haydn – Arianna a Naxos, Hob. XXVIb:2 (E♭-f)
- Miriam Hyde – "Marsh Birds" for Flute and Piano (D-b)
- Lalo – Rapsodie norvégienne (A-d)
- Martinů – Etude in D, No. 1 from Etudes and Polkas Book I (D–b♭)
- Massenet – Piano Concerto (E♭-c)
- Mozart – Die Entführung aus dem Serail (The Abduction from the Seraglio), Aria, "Solche Hergelauf'ne Laffen" (F-a) (though the aria is interrupted by spoken dialogue after the full cadence in F major, before continuing in A minor at a new tempo)
- Mozart (completed by Süssmayr) – Requiem, VII. Communio (B♭-d) (ends on an open fifth in a D minor context)
- Mozart – Preludes K. 284a/395, iii (B♭-c)
- Mozart – Preludes and Fugues K. 404, v (E♭-c)
- Mussorgsky (completed by Stravinsky) – Khovanshchina (E-g♯)
  - The key scheme in the opera is constructed mostly on a sharp-flat principle; thus the opening, reaching G♯ major, is the sharpest music in the whole opera, and many portentions or descriptions of disaster in the opera are written in six or seven flats or even beyond. Mussorgsky intended an ending in A♭ minor for the final scene, in which the Old Believers commit mass suicide; this was respected by Stravinsky in his completion, although written enharmonically for easier reading. Other completions do not respect this: Rimsky-Korsakov ends in A♭ major, Shostakovich in F major. Valery Gergiev's productions, though using Shostakovich's completion, cut the final bars and end with an orchestral restatement of the Old Believers' final chorus (as written by Rimsky-Korsakov and reorchestrated by Shostakovich) in G♯ minor, thus following the original key scheme.
- Rudolf Peterka – Piano Trio Op. 6 (D-b)
- Poulenc – Piano Sextet, ii (D♭-a♭)
- Poulenc – Suite Francaise FP 80, ii (F-d)
- Poulenc – Trio pour piano hautbois et basson, ii (B♭-f)
- Poulenc – Gloria FP 177, i (G-b)
- Poulenc – Oboe Sonata FP 185, (G-a♭)
- Rheinberger – Piano Sonata Op. 47 (C-a)
- Satie – Gnossiennes Nos. 5 (G-e) and 6 (F-c)
- Schoenberg – Chamber Symphony No. 2, Op. 38, ii (G-e♭)
- Schubert – Die Nonne, D. 212 (A♭-f)
- Schubert – Grablied, D. 218 (A♭-f)
- Schubert – Erster Verlust, D. 226 (A♭-f)
- Schubert – Piano Sonata, D. 279 (C-a)
  - However, some authorities consider this to be an unfinished work; two incomplete C-major movements (D. 346 and D. 309A) have been put forward as candidates for the missing finale, both of which would make this cease to be major/minor.
- Schubert – Deutscher Tanz, D. 365 No. 22 (Op. 9 No. 22) (B-g♯)
- Schubert – Ritter Toggenburg, D. 397 (F-b♭)
- Schubert – Der Herbstabend, D. 405 (A♭-f)
- Schubert – Klage an den Mond, D. 436 (F-d)
- Schubert – Edone, D. 445 (E♭-c)
- Schubert – Liedesend, D. 473 (E♭-e, both versions)
- Schubert – Didone Abbandonata, D. 510 (E♭-f)
- Schubert – Auf der Donau, D. 553 (Op. 21 No. 1) (E♭-f♯)
- Schubert – Der Pilgrim, D. 794 (Op. 37 No. 1) (D-b, originally E-c♯)
- Schumann – Réplique, No. 8 of Carnaval (B♭-g)
- Schumann – No. 16 of Davidsbündlertänze (G-b)
- Schumann – Kreisleriana, No. 4 (B♭-d) (first edition only)
- Sibelius – Scène Lyrique, No. 3 from 5 Romantic Pieces Op. 101 (E-c♯)
- Smetana – The Bartered Bride, Aria, "Kdybych se co takového" (B♭-g)
- W.G. Still – Symphony No. 3 (A-c)
- Tchaikovsky – The Sleeping Beauty – Finale and Apotheosis (D-g)
- Tchaikovsky – Six Pieces Op. 21, No. 1 "Prelude" (B-g♯)
- Wagenseil – Sonata No. 5 (B♭-g)
- Vaughan Williams – Three Shakespeare Songs, "The Cloud Capp'd Towers" (D-f) (reverse Picardy third)

== See also ==
- Tonality
- Parallel key
- Progressive tonality
