= Piano sextet =

Composition for piano and five other musical instruments

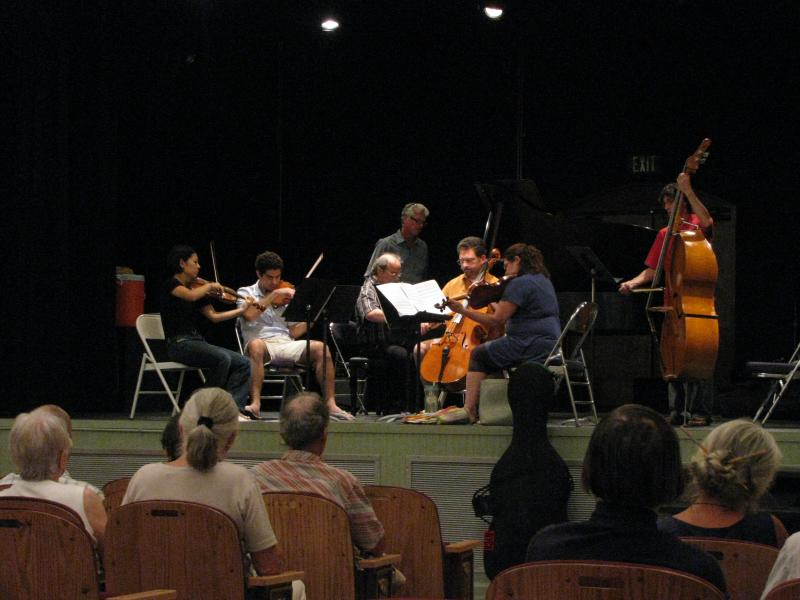
Piano sextet rehearsal with page-turner

A piano sextet is a composition for piano and five other musical instruments, or a group of six musicians who perform such works. There is no standard grouping of instruments with that name, and compared to the string quartet or piano quintet literature, relatively few such compositions exist. The best-known piano sextet is probably the Sextet by Poulenc, one of the pinnacles of the wind and piano repertoire. Chausson's Concert is widely regarded as one of the masterpieces of French strings and piano chamber music literature (for example, the critic Jean Gallois describes it as "superb").

The following is an incomplete list of piano sextet composers and their works in this genre:

- Theodor Blumer (1881–1964), Sextet, Op. 45, composed 1921, for piano and wind quintet
- Philippe Boesmans (1936–2022), Sextuor à clavier, composed 2005, for piano and string quintet
- Ernest Chausson (1855–1899), Concert in D major, Op. 21, composed 1891, for piano, violin, and string quartet
- Aaron Copland (1900–1990), Sextet, composed 1938, for piano, clarinet, and string quartet
- Ernst von Dohnányi (1877–1960), Sextet for string trio, clarinet, horn, and piano
- Louise Farrenc (1804–1875), Sextet in C minor, op. 40, composed 1852, for piano and wind quintet
- Mikhail Glinka (1804–1857)
  - Grand Sextet (Sestetto originale) in E♭ major, composed 1832, for piano, string quartet, and double bass
  - Serenade (Divertimento brillante) on Themes from Bellini's La Sonnambula in A♭ major, composed 1832, for piano, string quartet, and double bass
- Hans Huber (1852–1921) Sextet in B♭ major, composed 1898, for piano and wind quintet
- Vincent d'Indy (1851–1931), Sarabande et Menuet, Op. 72 for piano and wind quintet, arranged 1918 by the composer from his earlier Suite dans le style ancien, Op. 24 (1886) for 2 flutes, trumpet and string quartet
- Gordon Jacob (1895–1984), Sextet in B♭ major, composed 1956, for piano and wind quintet
- Joseph Jongen (1873–1953), Rapsodie, Op. 70, composed 1922, for piano and wind quintet
- Paul Juon (1872–1940), Divertimento, Op. 51, composed 1913, for piano and wind quintet
- Sergei Lyapunov (1859–1924), Sextet in B♭ minor, Op. 63, composed 1916/1921, for piano, string quartet, and double bass
- Bohuslav Martinů (1890–1959)
  - ballet, La revue de cuisine, composed 1927, for piano, violin, cello, clarinet, bassoon, and trumpet
  - Piano Sextet, composed 1929, for piano, flute, oboe, clarinet, and two bassoons
- Felix Mendelssohn (1809–1847), Sextet in D major, Op. 110, composed 1824, for piano, violin, two violas, cello, and double bass
- Krzysztof Penderecki (born 1933), Sextet for string trio, clarinet, horn, and piano
- Francis Poulenc (1899–1963), Sextet, composed 1939, for piano and wind quintet
- Sergei Prokofiev (1891–1953), Overture on Hebrew Themes in C minor, Op. 34, for piano, clarinet, and string quartet
- Albert Roussel (1869–1937), Divertissement, Op. 6, composed 1906, for piano and wind quintet
- Ludwig Thuille (1861–1907), Sextet in B♭, Op. 6, composed 1886, for piano and wind quintet
- Felix Weingartner (1863–1942), Sextet Op. 33; for piano, two violins, viola, violoncello and double bass
- Jorge Grundman (b. 1961), Piano Sextet in E minor Op. 83 for piano, two violins, viola, violoncello and double bass

Closely related forms of chamber music include the piano trio, the piano quartet and the piano quintet.
