= List of compositions by Ernest Chausson =

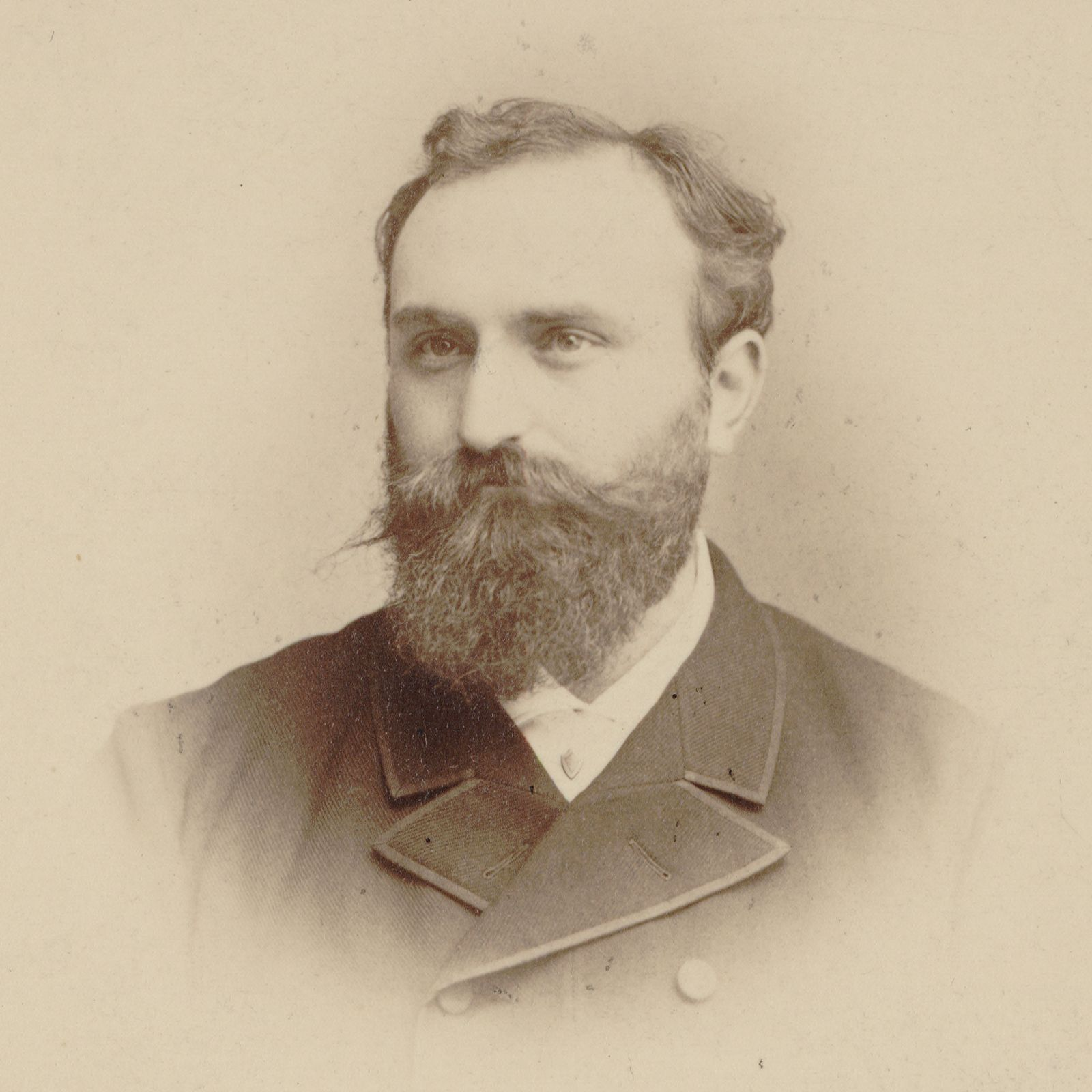
Ernest Chausson, cabinet card photo by P. Frois, Biarritz (France), ca. 1885, Bibliothèque nationale de France.

This is a list of compositions by Ernest Chausson.

== Works with opus number ==
- Op. 1, Five Fantasies for piano (1879–80)
- Op. 2, Seven Melodies
  - Nanny, to words by Leconte de Lisle (1880)
  - Le charme, to words by A. Silvestre (1879)
  - Les papillons, to words by Théophile Gautier (1880)
  - La dernière feuille, to words by Gautier (1880)
  - Sérénade italienne, to words by Paul Bourget (1880)
  - Hébé, to words by Louise Ackermann (1882)
  - Le colibri, to words by Leconte de Lisle (1882)
- Op. 3, Piano Trio in G minor (1881)
- Op. 4, Les caprices de Marianne, lyric comedy, with libretto by Alfred de Musset (1882-4), incomplete
- Op. 5, Viviane, symphonic poem on a legend of the Round Table (1882, rev. 1887)
- Op. 6, Two Motets for voices, violin, and organ (1883)
  - No. 1 Deus Abraham
  - No. 2 Ave verum
- Op. 7, Hélène, lyric drama, in two acts, with libretto by Leconte de Lisle (1883-4), incomplete
- Op. 8, Four Melodies, to words by Maurice Bouchor
  - Nocturne (1886)
  - Amour d'antan (1882)
  - Printemps triste (1883)
  - Nos souvenirs (1888)
- Op. 9, Hymne védique for four voices and orchestra, to words by Leconte de Lisle (1886)
- Op. 10, Solitude dans les bois, symphonic poem (1886, destroyed)
- Op. 11, Two duos for voices (1883)
  - La nuit, to words by Théodore de Banville
  - Le réveil, to words by Honoré de Balzac
- Op. 12, Three motets for four voices, cello, harp, and organ (1886)
  - No. 1 Ave Maria
  - No. 2 Tota pulchra es
  - No. 3 Ave maris stella
- Op. 13, Four Melodies
  - Apaisement, to words by Paul Verlaine (1885)
  - Sérénade, to words by Jean Lahor (1887)
  - L'aveu, to words by Villiers de L'Isle-Adam (1887)
  - La cigale, to words by Leconte de Lisle (1887)
- Op. 14, La caravane, song to words by Gautier (1887, also orch.)
- Op. 15, Chant nuptial, song for four female voices, to words by Leconte de Lisle (1887-8)
- Op. 16, Three Motets
  - No. 1 Lauda Sion for voice, organ, and harp (1888)
  - No. 2 Benedictus for two sopranos and harp (1890)
  - No. 3 Pater noster for voice and organ (1891)
- Op. 17, Chansons de Miarka, to words by Jean Richepin (1888)
  - Les morts
  - La pluie
- Op. 18, La tempête, incidental music for Shakespeare's The Tempest (tr. M. Bouchor), for solo voices and small orchestra (1888); five pieces (Chant d'Ariel, Air de danse, Duo de Junon et Cérès, Danse rustique, Chanson d'Ariel) were later arranged for solo voices, flute, violin, viola, cello, harp, and celesta (pub. 1905)
- Op. 19, Poème de l'amour et de la mer for voice and orchestra, to words by M. Bouchor (1882–90; rev. 1893)
- Op. 20, Symphony in B-flat (1889–90)
- Op. 21, Concert for Violin, Piano and String Quartet in D major (1889–91)
- Op. 22, La légende de Sainte Cécile, incidental music, to words by Bouchor (1891)
- Op. 23, Le roi Arthus, original lyric drama in three acts (1886–95)
- Op. 24, Serres chaudes, song cycle to words by Maurice Maeterlinck
  - Serre chaude (1896)
  - Serre d'ennui (1893)
  - Lassitude (1893)
  - Fauves las (1896)
  - Oraison (1895)
- Op. 25, Poème for violin and orchestra (1896)
- Op. 26, Quelques danses (Some Dances) for piano (1896)
  - No. 1 Dédicace
  - No. 2 Sarabande
  - No. 3 Pavane
  - No. 4 Forlane
- Op. 27, Three lieder, to words by Camille Mauclair (1896)
  - Les heures
  - Ballade
  - Les couronnes
- Op. 28, Songs of Shakespeare (tr. Bouchor)
  - Chanson de clown from Twelfth Night (1890)
  - Chanson d'amour from Measure for Measure (1891)
  - Chanson d'Ophélie from Hamlet (1896)
  - Chant funèbre from Much Ado about Nothing for four female voices (1897)
- Op. 29, Ballata (orig. title Canzoniere di Dante), to words by Dante, for four voices (1896-7)
- Op. 30, Piano Quartet in A (1897)
- Op. 31, Vêpres pour le commun des vierges for organ (1897)
- Op. 32, Soir de fête, symphonic poem (1897-8)
- Op. 33, Pour un arbre de Noël, song (1898)
- Op. 34, Deux poèmes (Two Poems), songs with words by Verlaine (1898)
  - La chanson bien douce
  - Le chevalier malheur
- Op. 35, String Quartet in C minor (1897-9)
- Op. 36, Two Melodies
  - Cantique à l'épouse, to words by A. Jounet (1896)
  - Dans la forêt du charme et de l'enchantement, to words by Jean Moréas (1898)
- Op. 37, "Chanson perpétuelle" for soprano and orchestra or piano quintet, to words by Charles Cros (1898)
- Op. 38, Paysage (Landscape) for piano (1895)
- Op. 39, Piece for cello or viola, and piano (1897)

== Works without opus number ==
Stage

- Les oiseaux, incidental music for Aristophanes' The Birds, for flute and harp (1889)

Vocal-orchestral

- La veuve du roi basque, ballad to words by L. Brethous-Lafargue (1879)
- Hylas, to words by Leconte de Lisle (1879–80)
- Esméralda, to words by Victor Hugo (1880)
- Hymne à la nature, to words by A. Silvestre (1881)
- L'arabe, cantata (1881)

Orchestral

- Symphony No. 2 (sketches, 1899)

Chamber

- Andante and Allegro for clarinet and piano (1881)
- Concerto for piano, oboe, viola, and string quartet (sketches, 1897)

Piano

- Sonatinas for piano four hands (1878)
  - No. 1 in G minor
  - No. 2 in D minor
- Eleven Fugues on Themes by Bach, Franck, Massenet, and Saint-Saëns for piano (1880-1)
- Marche militaire for piano (1884)

Sacred

- O salutaris in B for organ, piano, or harp (1879)
- Tantum ergo for voice, organ, violin, and harp (1891)

Songs for voice and piano

- Le Temps des Lilas, to words by Bouchor (1877)
- Le petit sentier, to words by Bouchor (1878)
- Deux mélodies, to words by Bouchor (1878)
  - Chanson
  - L'Âme des Bois
- L'albatros, to words by Charles Baudelaire (1879)
- Le rideau de ma voisine, to words by Alfred de Musset (1879)
- Nous nous aimerons, to words by anon. (1882)
- Le mort maudit, to words by J. Richepin (1884)
- Epithalame, to words by Bouchor (1886)
- Marins dévots à la Vierge, to words by L.-P. Fargue (1898)
