= String Quartet No. 2 (Shostakovich) =

1944 string quartet by Dmitri Shostakovich

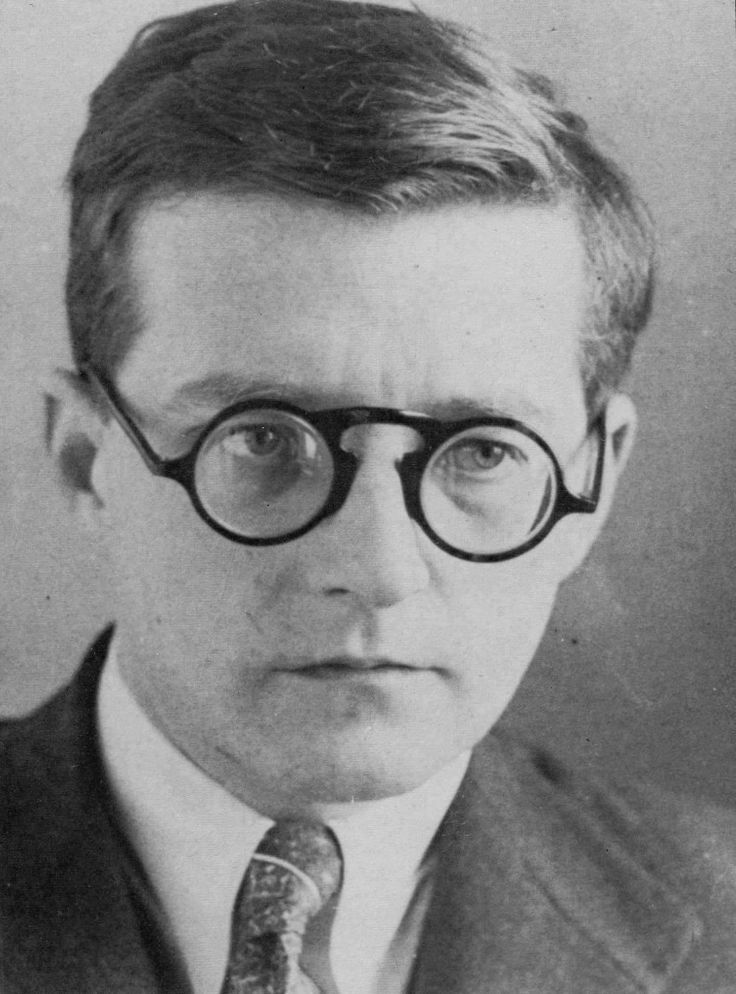
Dmitri Shostakovich before 1941

Dmitri Shostakovich's String Quartet No. 2 in A major, Op. 68, was completed in September 1944 in just nineteen days in Ivanovo, 300 kilometres north-east of Moscow. It was premiered by the Beethoven Quartet and is dedicated to the composer Vissarion Shebalin.

When Shostakovich began writing his Second String Quartet he had already completed eight of his fifteen symphonies. He was also half-way through his life. Another thirteen quartets remained to be composed, however, and they would come in rapid succession.

== Structure ==
The work has four movements:

1. Overture: Moderato con moto
2. Recitative and Romance: Adagio
3. Valse: Allegro
4. Theme with Variations: Adagio

Playing time is approximately 35 minutes, one minute shorter than his longest, String Quartet No. 15.

The overture that the work begins with is in sonata form, traditional for the first movement of such a work. The music is strong, forceful, and animated. This strong tone is subdued by the lyrical, wandering mood of the recitative. The first violin leads a slow, distressed line of music over soft seventh chords, and eventually finds calm in the romance. The finale works around to and ends in A minor, meaning that the quartet ends in the parallel minor to the opening major key.
