= Le Chasseur maudit (Franck) =

Symphonic poem by César Franck

- by César Franck
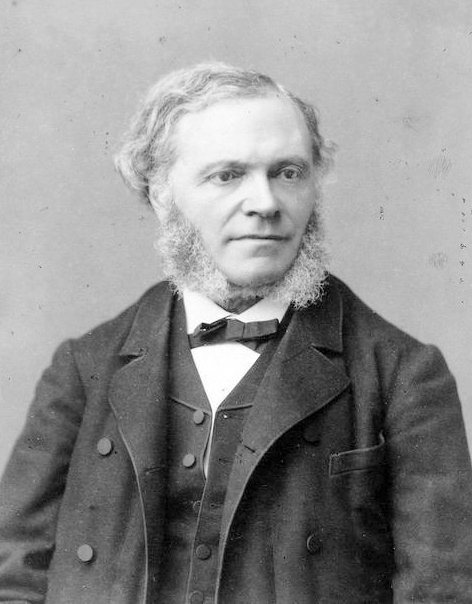
- César Franck, photographed by Pierre Petit, 1887
- English: The Accursed Huntsman
- Genre: Symphonic poem
- Performed: 31 March 1883: Salle Érard

Le Chasseur maudit (The Accursed Huntsman) is a symphonic poem by César Franck. The sections of the work are:

1. The Peaceful Sunday Landscape
2. The Hunt
3. The Curse
4. The Demons' Chase

The piece is scored for piccolo, two flutes, two oboes, two clarinets in B♭, four bassoons, four horns, two trumpets in F, two cornets in B♭, three trombones, tuba, percussion (timpani, tubular bells, cymbals, triangle, and bass drum), and strings.

It was inspired by the ballad Der wilde Jäger (The Wild Hunter) by the German poet Gottfried August Bürger. It tells the story of a Count of the Rhine who dares to go hunting on a Sunday morning, in violation of the Sabbath. As the piece begins, the count defiantly sounds his hunting horn, despite the warnings of the church bells and sacred chants which call the faithful to worship. Deep in the woods, the count is cursed by a terrible voice which condemns him to be pursued by demons for eternity.

The Kennedy Center describes the story this way:

On a Sunday morning, as church bells summon the faithful to worship and sacred chants fill the air, the Count sets off on a hunt. Pious elders plead with him to call off his expedition, but he responds contemptuously and rides roughshod through the village farms, trampling crops and applying the whip to the peasants in his way. Eventually he finds himself lost in the woods, where a stern voice from unseen heights pronounces his sentence: "Accursed hunter, be thou eternally pursued by Hell!" The Count tries to flee, but flames surround him and his horse. Imps and demons pursue him, now goading him on, now blocking his path; through daylight and darkness the wild ride continues. Even when horse and rider fall into an abyss there is no respite; they are borne through the air to ride on and on in unremitting punishment for blaspheming the Lord's Day.

Franck's orchestration evokes the dark, fantastic atmosphere of the infernal chase. The conclusion of the piece recalls the macabre Songe d'une nuit de sabbat of Hector Berlioz's Symphonie Fantastique (1830).

Franck completed Le Chasseur maudit on 31 October 1882, and had the work premiered on 31 March 1883, at the Salle Érard, in a concert of the Société Nationale de Musique conducted by Édouard Colonne. The same concert also presented the premiere of the symphonic poem Viviane by Franck's pupil, Ernest Chausson.

Among the recordings of the piece, the 1962 RCA Victor recording by Charles Munch and the Boston Symphony Orchestra has long been available, first on LP and then on CD. It was recorded in Münch's last season as music director in Boston and features the orchestra's custom-made chimes in the finale.

== See also ==
- Wild Hunt
