= Symphony No. 4 (Mendelssohn) =

Symphony by Felix Mendelssohn Bartholdy

Symphony No. 4 in A major
- Italian
- by Felix Mendelssohn
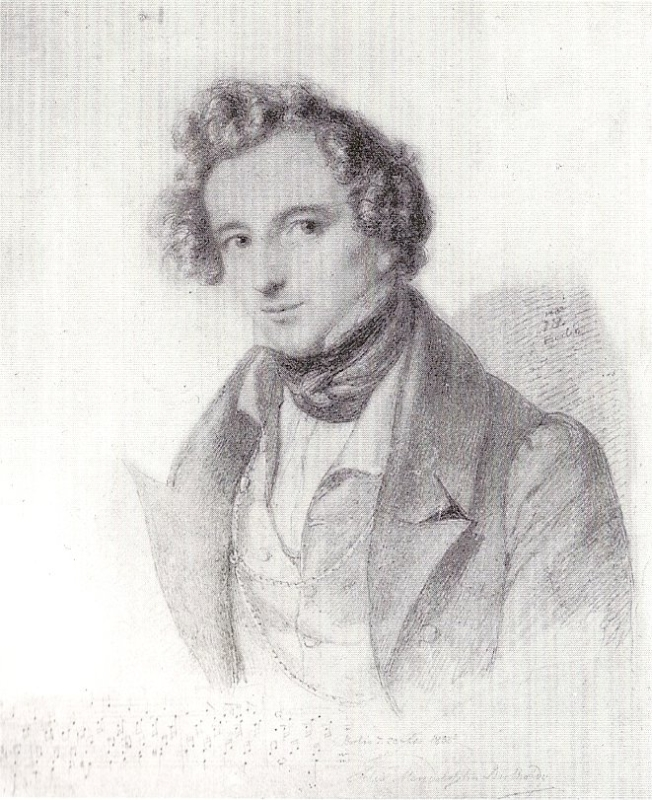
- Drawing of the composer by Eduard Bendemann, 1833
- Key: A major
- Opus: 90
- Composed: 1833, revised 1834
- Performed: 13 May 1833
- Published: 1851
- Movements: Four

The Symphony No. 4 in A major, Op. 90, MWV N 16, commonly known as the Italian, is an orchestral symphony written by German composer Felix Mendelssohn.

== History ==
The work has its origins, as had the composer's Scottish 3rd Symphony and The Hebrides overture, in the tour of Europe which occupied Mendelssohn from 1829 to 1831. Its inspiration is the colour and atmosphere of Italy, where Mendelssohn made sketches but left the work incomplete. Below is a snippet of a letter he wrote to his father:

This is Italy! And now has begun what I have always thought ... to be the supreme joy in life. And I am loving it. Today was so rich that now, in the evening, I must collect myself a little, and so I am writing to you to thank you, dear parents, for having given me all this happiness.

In February he wrote from Rome to his sister Fanny,

The Italian symphony is making great progress. It will be the jolliest piece I have ever done, especially the last movement. I have not found anything for the slow movement yet, and I think that I will save that for Naples.

Mendelssohn completed the symphony in Berlin on 13 March 1833, in response to an invitation for a symphony from the London (now Royal) Philharmonic Society. He conducted the first performance himself in London on 13 May 1833 at a London Philharmonic Society concert. The symphony was first performed in the United States by the Germania Musical Society, Carl Bergmann conducting, at Boston on 1 November 1851.

Mendelssohn himself, however, remained dissatisfied with the symphony. He completed revisions to the work, particularly the last 3 movements, in July 1834. However, he never published the symphony during his lifetime. The symphony was published in 1851, in the original version given at the May 1833 premiere. The scholar John Cooper has investigated in detail the history of Mendelssohn's revisions to the symphony. Christopher Hogwood has edited a critical edition, published by Bärenreiter, of the symphony that includes the original standard version and Mendelssohn's revisions to the last 3 movements.

The published 1851 version is the standard edition performed generally by symphony orchestras. The revised version received its first commercial recording from Sir John Eliot Gardiner and the Vienna Philharmonic Orchestra in 1999, and has received occasional live performances. Edward Greenfield has commented on Mendelssohn's changes between the two editions, in relation to the reasons for continuing performances of the standard edition:

Surprisingly for so perceptive a composer he undermined the original's freshness, smoothing over melodic lines (as in the Pilgrim's March) and extending linking passages. A fascinating comment on the danger of second thoughts after white-hot inspiration."

== Structure ==
I. Allegro vivace

II. Andante con moto

III. Con moto moderato

IV. Saltarello: Presto
Performed by the Musopen Symphony

The symphony is scored for 2 flutes, 2 oboes, 2 clarinets, 2 bassoons, 2 horns, 2 trumpets, timpani and strings. It is in four movements:

1. Allegro vivace (A major)
2. Andante con moto (D minor)
3. Con moto moderato (A major)
4. Presto and Finale: Saltarello (A minor)

The joyful first movement, in sonata form, is followed by an impression in the subdominant minor, D minor, of a religious procession the composer witnessed in Naples. The third movement is a minuet in which French horns are introduced in the trio, while the final movement (which is in the parallel minor key throughout) incorporates dance figurations from the Roman saltarello and the Neapolitan tarantella. It is among the first large multi-movement works to begin in a major key and end in the tonic minor, another example being Brahms's first piano trio. Being an early romantic work, the symphony features greater use of individual melodies for woodwinds and a broad dynamic range.

Due to the beginning of the piece requiring specific articulation and dynamics while necessitating staying in tempo, many orchestral auditions, particularly for violinists, use an excerpt from the beginning of the 1st movement.

A typical performance lasts about half an hour.
