= Concert for Violin, Piano and String Quartet =

Composition by Ernest Chausson

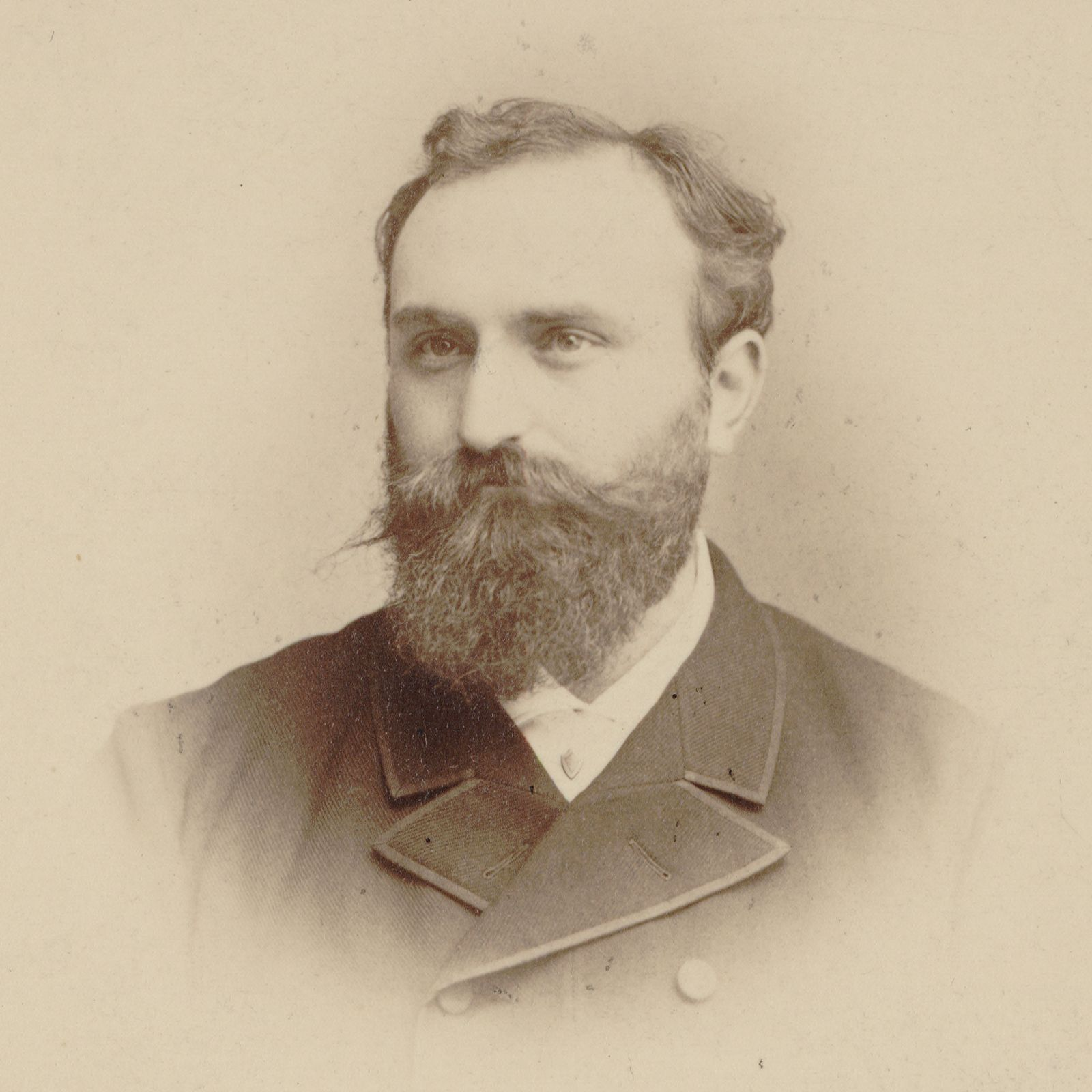
Ernest Chausson ca. 1885

The Concert for Violin, Piano and String Quartet, Op. 21 (French: Concert pour piano, violon et quatuor à cordes) is a piano sextet by Ernest Chausson scored for piano, violin and string quartet. The work was composed between 1888 and 1891.

== Structure ==
There are four movements:

1. Décidé – Animé
2. Sicilienne: Pas vite
3. Grave
4. Très animé

== Première performance ==
The work was first performed in Brussels on 26 February 1892, with Eugène Ysaÿe taking the solo violin part. The work was well received. Chausson wrote in his diary:

"I must believe that my music is made for Belgians above all, for never have I enjoyed such a success [...] I feel giddy and joyful, such as I have not managed to feel for a long time [...] It seems to me that I shall work with greater confidence in future."
