= Piano Trio No. 1 (Brahms) =

Piano trio by Johannes Brahms

Piano Trio in B major
- No. 1
- by Johannes Brahms
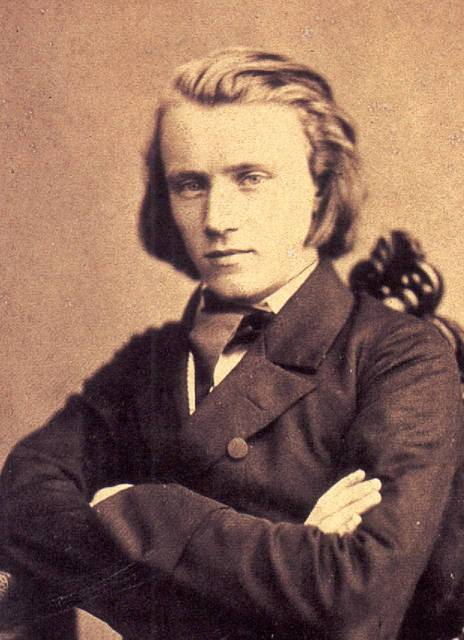
- The composer in 1853
- Key: B major
- Opus: 8
- Form: Piano trio
- Composed: 1854, revised 1889
- Performed: 13 October 1855: Gdańsk
- Published: 1854
- Movements: four

The Piano Trio No. 1 in B major, Op. 8, by Johannes Brahms was completed in January 1854, when the composer was only twenty years old, published in November 1854 and premiered on 13 October 1855 in Danzig. It has often been mistakenly claimed that the first performance had taken place in the United States. Brahms produced a revised version of the work in summer 1889 that shows significant alterations so that it may even be regarded as a distinct (fourth) piano trio. This "New Edition" (Neue Ausgabe), as he called it, was premiered on 10 January 1890 in Budapest and published in February 1891.

The trio is scored for piano, violin and cello, and it is the only work of Brahms to exist today in two published versions, although it is almost always the revised version that is performed today. The work is homotonal, with two movements in the key of B major and two in B minor. It is also among the few multimovement works to begin in a major key and end in the tonic minor (another example being Felix Mendelssohn's "Italian" Symphony).

== Structure ==
The trio is in four movements:

Original version (1854): (a typical performance takes around 42 minutes)

1. Allegro con moto — Tempo un poco più Moderato — Schnell (494 bars)
2. Scherzo: Allegro molto — Trio: Più lento — Tempo primo (459 bars)
3. Adagio non troppo — Allegro — Tempo primo (157 bars)
4. Finale: Allegro molto agitato — Un poco più lento — Tempo primo (518 bars)

Revised version (Neue Ausgabe) (1889): (a typical performance takes around 33 minutes)

1. Allegro con brio — Tranquillo — In tempo ma sempre sostenuto (289 bars)
2. Scherzo: Allegro molto — Meno allegro — Tempo primo (460 bars)
3. Adagio (99 bars)
4. Finale: Allegro (322 bars)

== Analysis ==
=== First movement ===
B major, 4/4, alla breve in revised version

This movement is a sonata form movement in B major. It begins with a broad theme in the cello and piano and builds in intensity. Between the two versions of the trio, Brahms made hardly any changes to the first 80 bars or so, except for omitting little interjections by the violin that he supposedly only included in the first version to meet a desire of Joseph Joachim. In the first version, the second subject group in G♯ minor (bar 84) includes various thematic elements, only one of which is taken up in the recapitulation as the basis for a fugue in stile antico (bar 354). In the coda of the original version, the main subject is finally brought to a climactic, fortissimo conclusion on the tonic (bar 473).

=== Second movement ===
B minor, trio section and ending in B major, 3/4

The B minor scherzo combines delicate filigree passages with fortissimo outbursts. The exuberant mood of the first movement returns in the trio section in B major. A Picardy third, which ends the movement in B major, sets the scene for the third movement, also in B major. The only alterations Brahms applied to this movement in his revision of the work were a doubling of the climactic trio melody in the cello, and a reworking of the coda.

=== Third movement ===
B major, 4/4

This movement, returning to B major and following a simple ternary form, opens with a spacious chordal theme in the piano, counterpoised by a middle section in which the cello plays a poignant G♯ minor melody making use of chromaticism (bar 33). In the first version, a different second theme was used – a quotation from Franz Schubert's "Am Meer" from Schwanengesang (bar 33) – and an Allegro section was included near the end of the movement (bar 82).

=== Fourth movement ===
B minor, 3/4

Back in B minor, the first theme of this movement is highly chromatic and slightly ambiguous tonally, with a very agitated dotted rhythm. This is perhaps the movement Brahms altered the most between the two versions, with the cello's original smooth second theme in F♯ major (bar 105)—an apparent allusion to Beethoven's "Nimm sie hin denn, diese Lieder" from An die ferne Geliebte, which is also quoted in Schumann's Fantasie Op. 17—being replaced by a more vigorous arpeggiated piano theme in D major (bar 64). The combined contour and rhythm of this new theme in its first four bars bear a striking resemblance to "The Star-Spangled Banner". After a B major episode recalling the mood of the first movement, the music returns to B minor and ends very turbulently.
