= Page-turner =

Person who turns sheet music pages

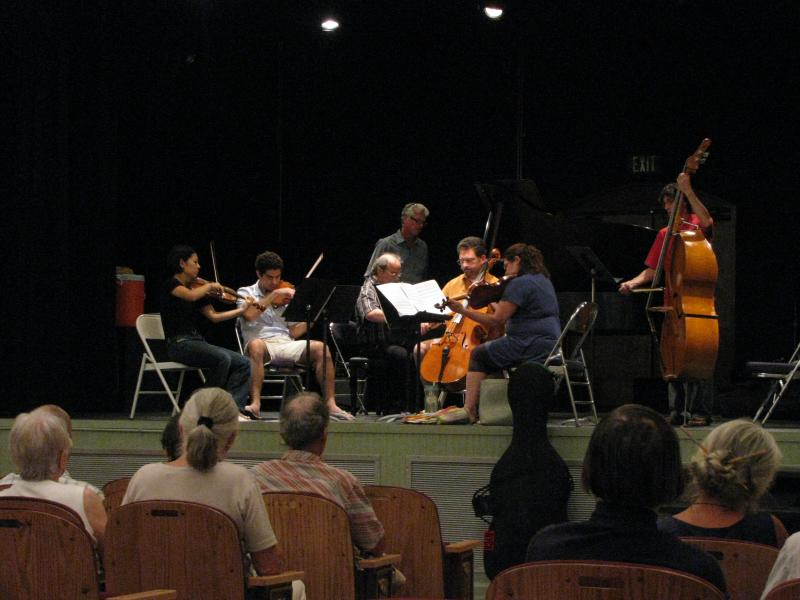
Piano sextet rehearsal with page turner

A page-turner is a person who turns sheet music pages for a musician, often a pianist, usually during a performance.

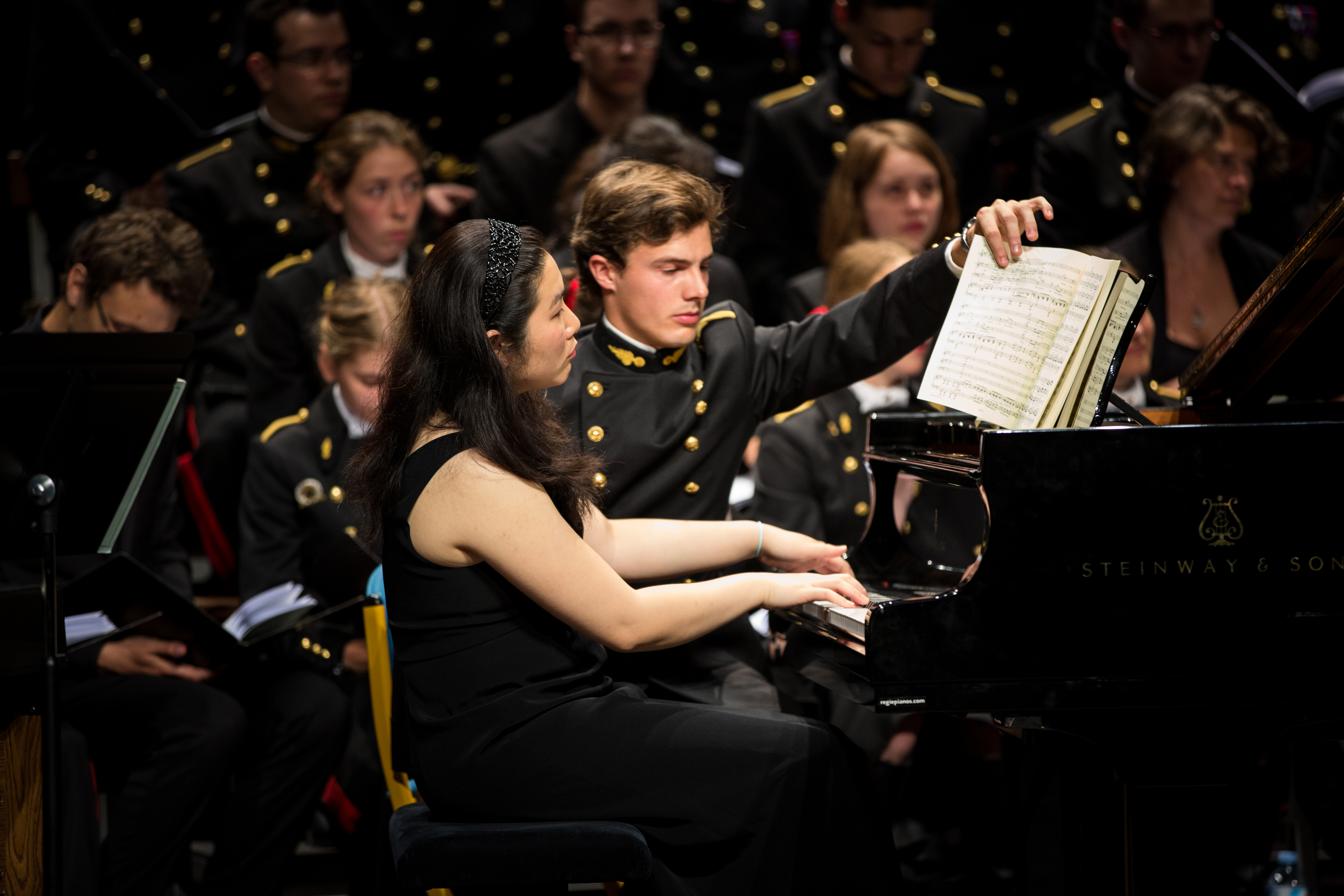
Performance with pianist and page turner

While some music is set so that the pages end at places where the musician can spare one hand to turn them, this is not always possible. A page-turner is often necessary for musicians who are playing complex pieces and prefer not to play from memory, or the page turn seems impossible to do if the musician wants to keep playing the piece cohesively without stopping. A page-turner should be able to understand the musician's signals, adequately follow the score, and anticipate how far ahead the accompanist reads the score in order to advance the music. Page turning also requires adequate knowledge of music and musical symbols. Page-turners are sometimes acquaintances of the performer or members of the accompanying orchestra doing a favor. Professional page-turners are often freelance casual workers, not associated with any given concert hall or orchestra. Traditionally, the page turner is often on the left side of the piano, and stands next to or sits on the piano bench for the entirety of the performance. They are also traditionally dressed in black or neutral performance attire.

Mechanical page-turners are also available, sometimes controlled by the musician via a foot pedal. Charles Hallé is said to have invented an early model of a mechanical page-turner for pianists. Foot pedals to turn pages are also available for music displayed on tablet computers, as well as apps that detect the wink of the player's eye as the turning signal. One of the first wireless page-turners with a pedal was invented in 2009, it included a pedal and a flash drive for a computer. Modern page turning devices emulate the tap of a finger on the touch screen of a tablet by using mechanical pedals wirelessly connected to the device. In 2020, the University of Malta began research on a software for musicians that could track the eye movement of a performer and turn pages based on where they gaze in the score.

== See also ==
- The Page Turner, a French film
- Der Umblätterer
