= Sextet (Dohnányi) =

Sextet written by Ernst von Dohnányi

Sextet in C major
- by Ernst von Dohnányi
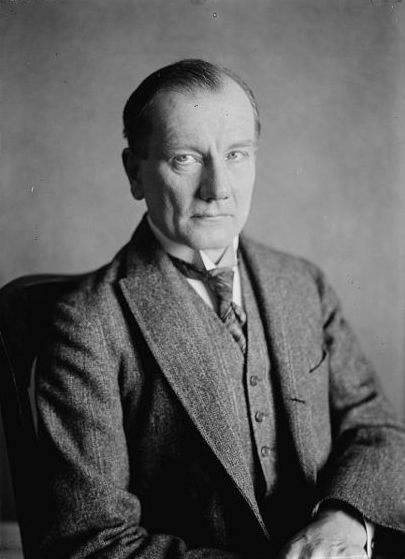
- Dohnányi in the early 1920s
- Key: C major
- Opus: 37
- Composed: 1935
- Movements: four
- Scoring: piano; violin; viola; cello; clarinet; horn

Premiere
- Date: 17 June 1935

The Sextet in C major for piano, violin, viola, cello, clarinet and horn, Op. 37, was composed by Ernst von Dohnányi in 1935. The sextet was written during a lengthy period of illness, during which Dohnányi was bedridden with a thrombosis for several months. It was premiered on 17 June 1935.

== Structure ==
External audio
- Performed by András Schiff, Gábor Takács-Nagy, András Fejér, Gabor Ormai, Radovan Vlatković, and Kálmán Berkes
- I. Allegro appassionato
- II. Intermezzo: Adagio
- III. Allegro con sentimento
- IV. Finale. Allegro vivace, giocoso

The sextet consists of four movements:

1. Allegro appassionata
  The first movement is composed in sonata form and seems to allude to the symphonies of Gustav Mahler.
2. Intermezzo. Adagio
  The second movement is a march.
3. Allegro con sentimento
  The third movement is a scherzo held in a more classical, Mendelssohnian style.
4. Finale. Allegro vivace, giocoso
  The final movement makes clear references to jazz, which European composers had started to embrace shortly after World War I, including Dohnányi's close friends Béla Bartók and Zoltán Kodály. The finale opens in a ragtime for clarinet and piano, after which the string trio responds. At the end, material of the opening movement reoccurs, in cyclicism typical for the late romantic period.

== Reception ==
A reviewer for the Budapesti Hírlap, who attended the premiere on 17 June 1935, wrote favorably of the work: "One of the sextet's greatest values is that it is melodically original. Every tune is invented, not borrowed, and not based on a quotation."
