= Picardy third =

Musical cadence

Picardy third ending an Aeolian (natural minor) progression

A Picardy third, (/ˈpɪkərdi/; French: tierce picarde) also known as a Picardy cadence or Tierce de Picardie, is a major chord of the tonic at the end of a musical section that is either modal or in a minor key. This is achieved by raising the third of the expected minor triad by a semitone to create a major triad, as a form of resolution.

For example, instead of a cadence ending on an A minor chord containing the notes A, C, and E, a Picardy third ending would consist of an A major chord containing the notes A, C♯, and E. The minor third between the A and C of the A minor chord has become a major third in the Picardy third chord.

Schütz "Heu mihi, Domine" from Cantiones Sacrae, 1625

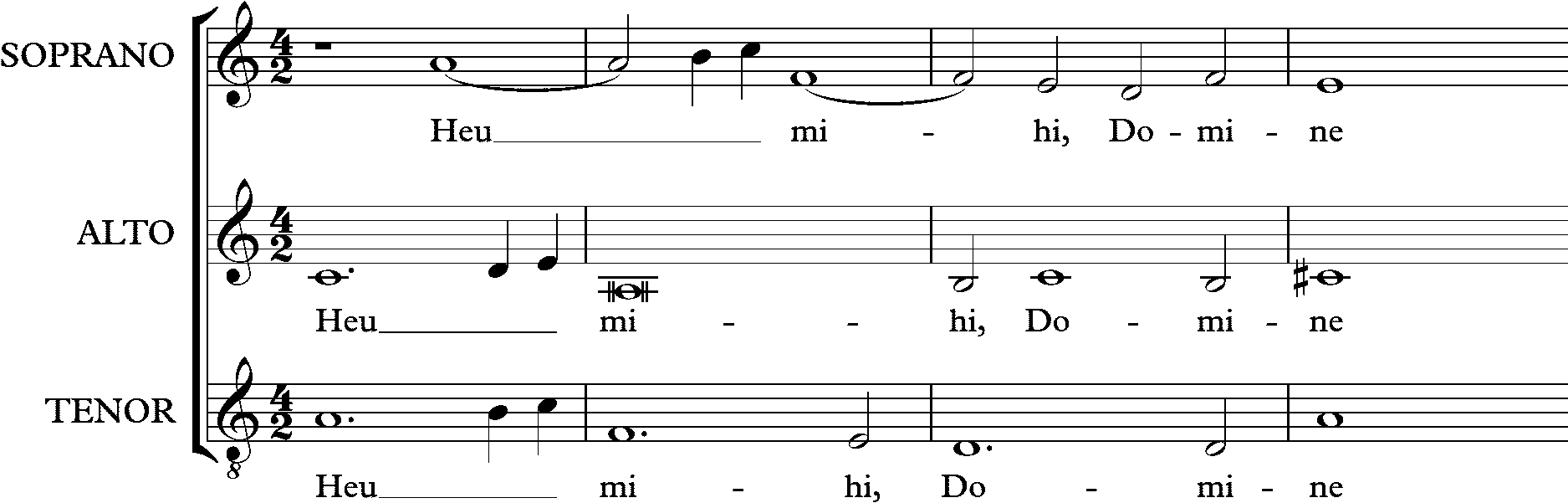
Schütz "Heu mihi, Domine" from Cantiones Sacrae, 1625

Philosopher Peter Kivy writes:

Even in instrumental music, the picardy third retains its expressive quality: it is the "happy third". ... Since at least the beginning of the seventeenth century, it is no longer enough to describe it as a resolution to the more consonant triad; it is a resolution to the happier triad as well. ... The picardy third is absolute music's happy ending. Furthermore, I hypothesize that in gaining this expressive property of happiness or contentment, the picardy third augmented its power as the perfect, most stable cadential chord, being both the most emotionally consonant chord, so to speak, as well as the most musically consonant.

According to Deryck Cooke, "Western composers, expressing the 'rightness' of happiness by means of a major third, expressed the 'wrongness' of grief by means of the minor third, and for centuries, pieces in a minor key had to have a 'happy ending' – a final major chord (the 'tierce de Picardie') or a bare fifth."

As a harmonic device, the Picardy third originated in Western music in the Renaissance era.

== Illustration ==
From Ich habe genug, BWV 82

What makes this a Picardy cadence is shown by the red natural sign. Instead of the expected B♭ (which would make the chord minor) the accidental gives us a B natural, making the chord major.

Listen to the final four measures of "I Heard the Voice of Jesus Say" with and without Picardy third (harmony by Ralph Vaughan Williams).

== History ==
=== Name ===
The term was first used in 1768 by Jean-Jacques Rousseau, although the practice was used in music centuries earlier. Rousseau argues that the practice "remained longer in Church Music, and, consequently, in Picardy, where there is music in a lot of cathedrals and churches", and "the term is used jokingly by musicians", suggesting it might have never had an academic basis, a tangible origin, and might have sprung out of idiomatic jokes in France in the first half of the 18th century.

Robert Hall hypothesizes that, instead of deriving from the Picardy region of France, it comes from the Old French word "picart", meaning "pointed" or "sharp" in northern dialects, and thus refers to the musical sharp that transforms the minor third of the chord into a major third.

The few Old French dictionaries in which the word picart (fem. picarde) appears give "aigu, piquant" as a definition. While piquant is quite straightforward—meaning spiky, pointy, sharp—aigu is much more ambiguous, because it has the inconvenience of having at least three meanings: "high-pitched/treble", "sharp" as in a sharp blade, and "acute". Considering the definitions also state the term can refer to a nail ("clou") (read masonry nail), a pike or a spit, it seems aigu might be there used to mean "pointy" / "sharp". However, not "sharp" in the desired sense, the one relating to a raised pitch, but in the sense of a sharp blade, which would thus completely discredit the word picart as the origin for the Picardy third, which also seems unlikely considering the possibility that aigu was also used to refer to a high(er)-pitched note, and a treble sound, thus perfectly explaining the use of the word picarde to designate a chord whose third is higher than it should be.

Not to be ignored is the existence of the proverb "ressembler le Picard" ("to resemble an inhabitant of Picard") which meant "éviter le danger" (to avoid danger). This would link back to the humorous character of the term, that would have thus been used to mock supposedly cowardly composers who used the Picardy third as a way to avoid the gravity of the minor third, and perhaps the backlash they would have faced from the academic elite and the Church by going against the time’s scholasticism.

Ultimately, the origin of the name "tierce picarde" will likely never be known for sure, but what evidence there is seems to point towards these idiomatic jokes and proverbs as well as the literal meaning of picarde as high-pitched and treble.

=== Use ===
In medieval music, such as that of Machaut, neither major nor minor thirds were considered stable intervals, and so cadences were typically on open fifths. As a harmonic device, the Picardy third originated in Western music in the Renaissance era. By the early seventeenth century, its use had become established in practice in music that was both sacred (as in the Schütz example above) and secular:

William Byrd, Pavane "The Earl of Salisbury", 1612

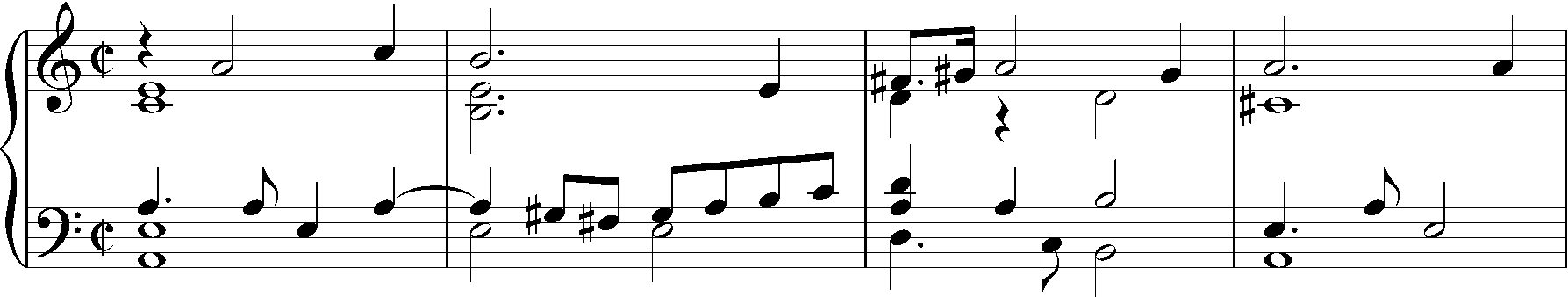
William Byrd, Pavane "The Earl of Salisbury", 1612 02

Examples of the Picardy third can be found throughout the works of J. S. Bach and his contemporaries, as well as earlier composers such as Thoinot Arbeau and John Blow. Many of Bach's minor key chorales end with a cadence featuring a final chord in the major:

J. S. Bach, Jesu meine Freude, BWV 81.7, mm. 12–13

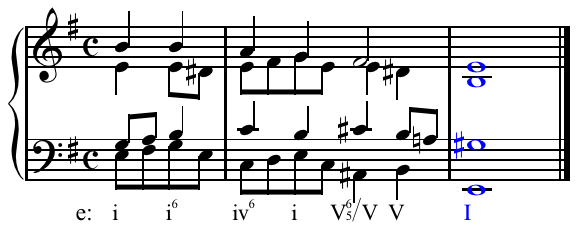
Picardy third, in blue, in Bach: Jesu, meine Freude (Jesus, My Joy), BWV 81.7, mm. 12–13.

In his book Music and Sentiment, Charles Rosen shows how Bach makes use of the fluctuations between minor and major to convey feeling in his music. Rosen singles out the Allemande from the keyboard Partita No. 1 in B♭, BWV 825, to exemplify "the range of expression then possible, the subtle variety of inflections of sentiment contained with a well-defined framework". The following passage from the first half of the piece starts in F major, but then, in bar 15, "Turning to the minor mode with a chromatic bass and then back to the major for the cadence adds still new intensity."

Bach, Allemande from Partita 1, bars 13–18

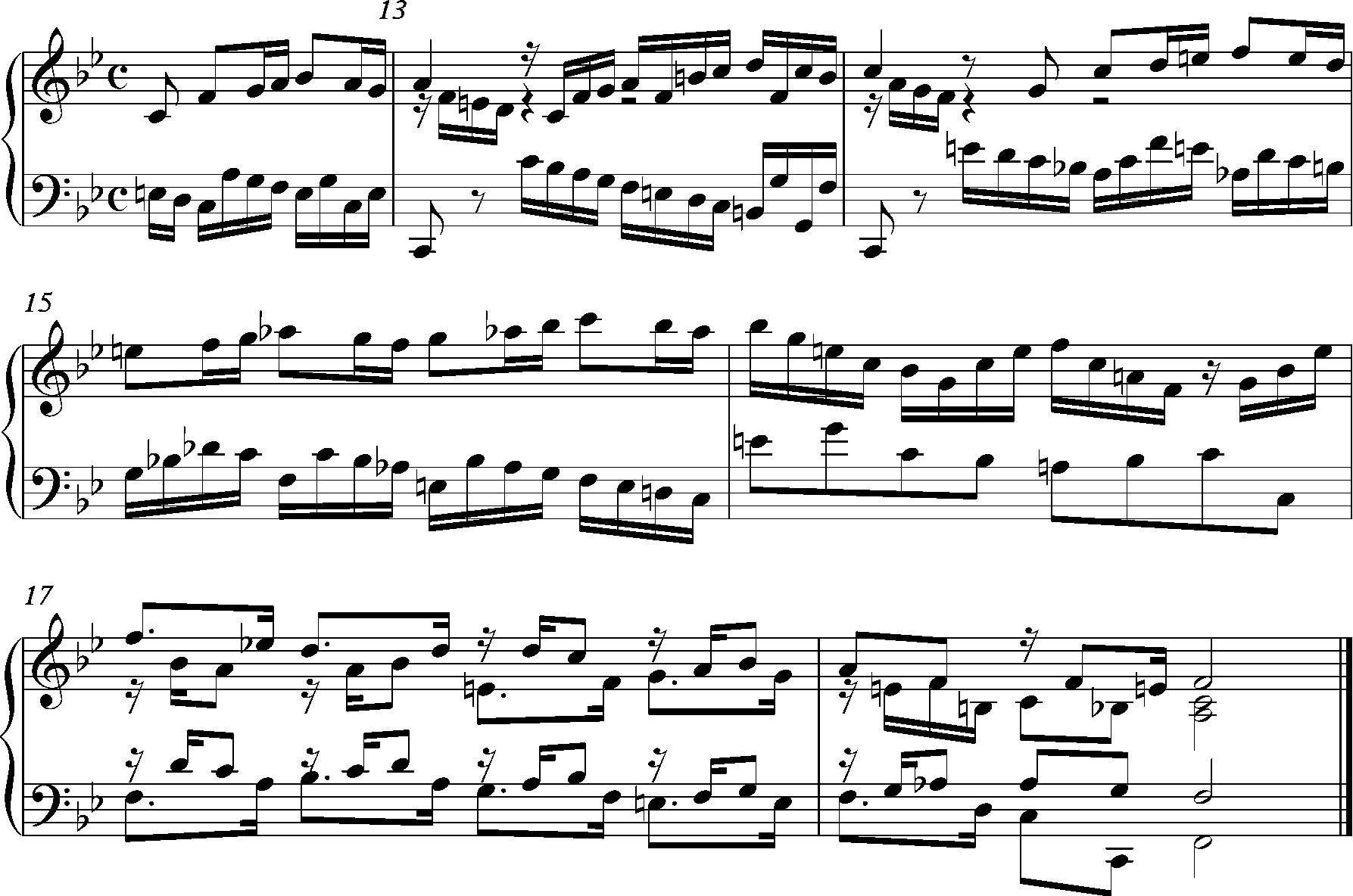
Bach Allemande from Partita 1, bars 13–18

Many passages in Bach's religious works follow a similar expressive trajectory involving major and minor keys that may sometimes take on a symbolic significance. For example, David Humphreys (1983, p. 23) sees the "languishing chromatic inflections, syncopations and appoggiaturas" of the following episode from the St Anne Prelude for organ, BWV 552 from Clavier-Übung III as "showing Christ in his human aspect. Moreover the poignant angularity of the melody, and in particular the sudden turn to the minor, are obvious expressions of pathos, introduced as a portrayal of his Passion and crucifixion":

From Bach "St Anne" Prelude for Organ, BWV 552, bars 118–130

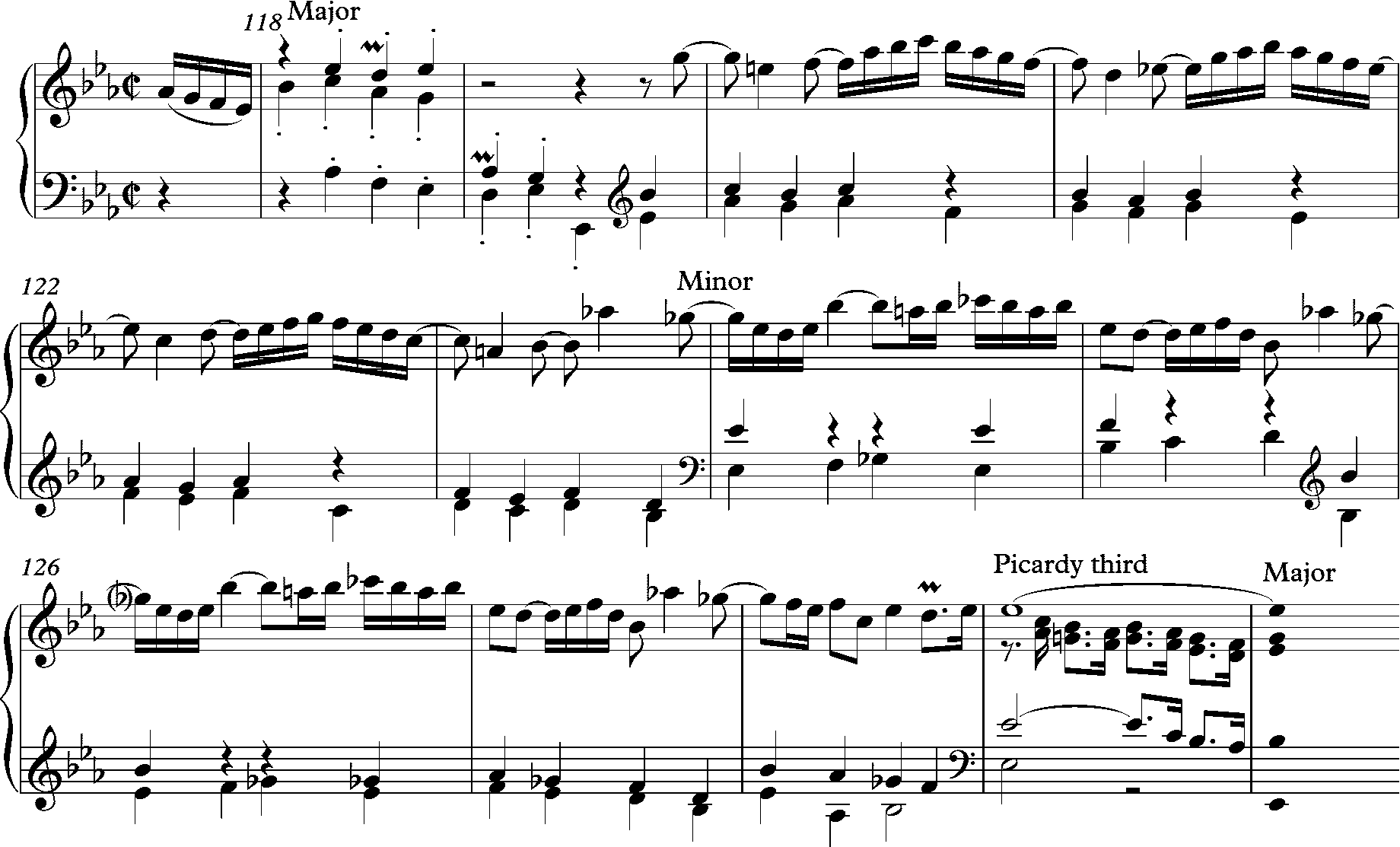
From Bach "St Anne" Prelude for Organ, BWV 552, bars 118–130

Notably, Bach's two books of The Well-Tempered Clavier, composed in 1722 and 1744 respectively, differ considerably in their application of Picardy thirds, which occur unambiguously at the end of all of the minor-mode preludes and all but one of the minor-mode fugues in the first book. In the second book, however, fourteen of the minor-mode movements end on a minor chord, or occasionally, on a unison. Manuscripts vary in many of these cases.

While the device was used less frequently during the Classical era, examples can be found in works by Haydn and Mozart, such as the slow movement of Mozart's Piano Concerto 21, K. 467:

Mozart, Piano Concerto 21, K. 467, slow movement, bars 83–93

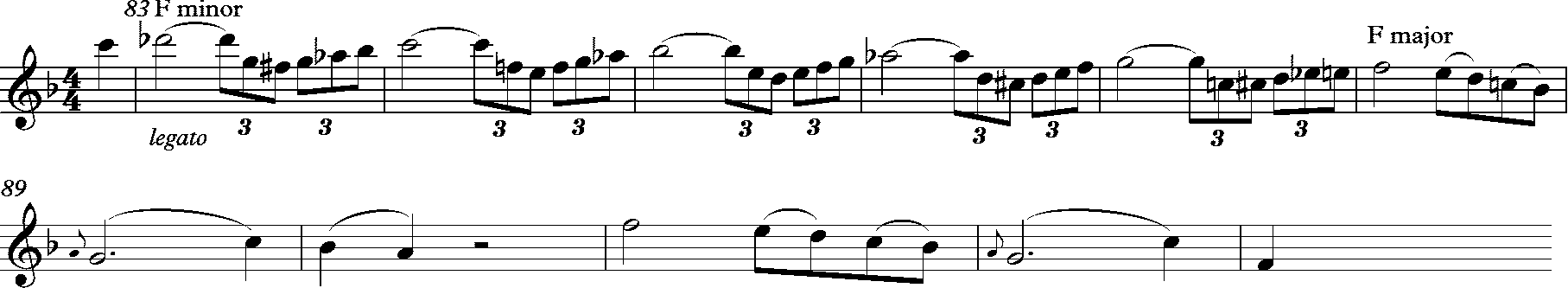
Mozart, Piano Concerto 21, K467, slow movement, bars 83–94

Philip Radcliffe says that the dissonant harmonies here "have a vivid foretaste of Schumann and the way they gently melt into the major key is equally prophetic of Schubert". At the end of his opera Don Giovanni, Mozart uses the switch from minor to major to considerable dramatic effect: "As the Don disappears, screaming in agony, the orchestra settles in on a chord of D major. The change of mode offers no consolation, though: it is more like the tierce de Picardie, the 'Picardy third' (a famous misnomer derived from tierce picarte, 'sharp third'), the major chord that was used to end solemn organ preludes and toccatas in the minor keys in days of old."

The fierce C minor drama that pervades the Allegro con brio ed appassionato movement from Beethoven's last Piano Sonata, Op. 111, dissipates as the prevailing tonality turns to the major in its closing bars "in conjunction with a concluding diminuendo to end the movement, somewhat unexpectedly, on a note of alleviation or relief".

Beethoven, Piano Sonata, Op. 111, first movement concluding bars

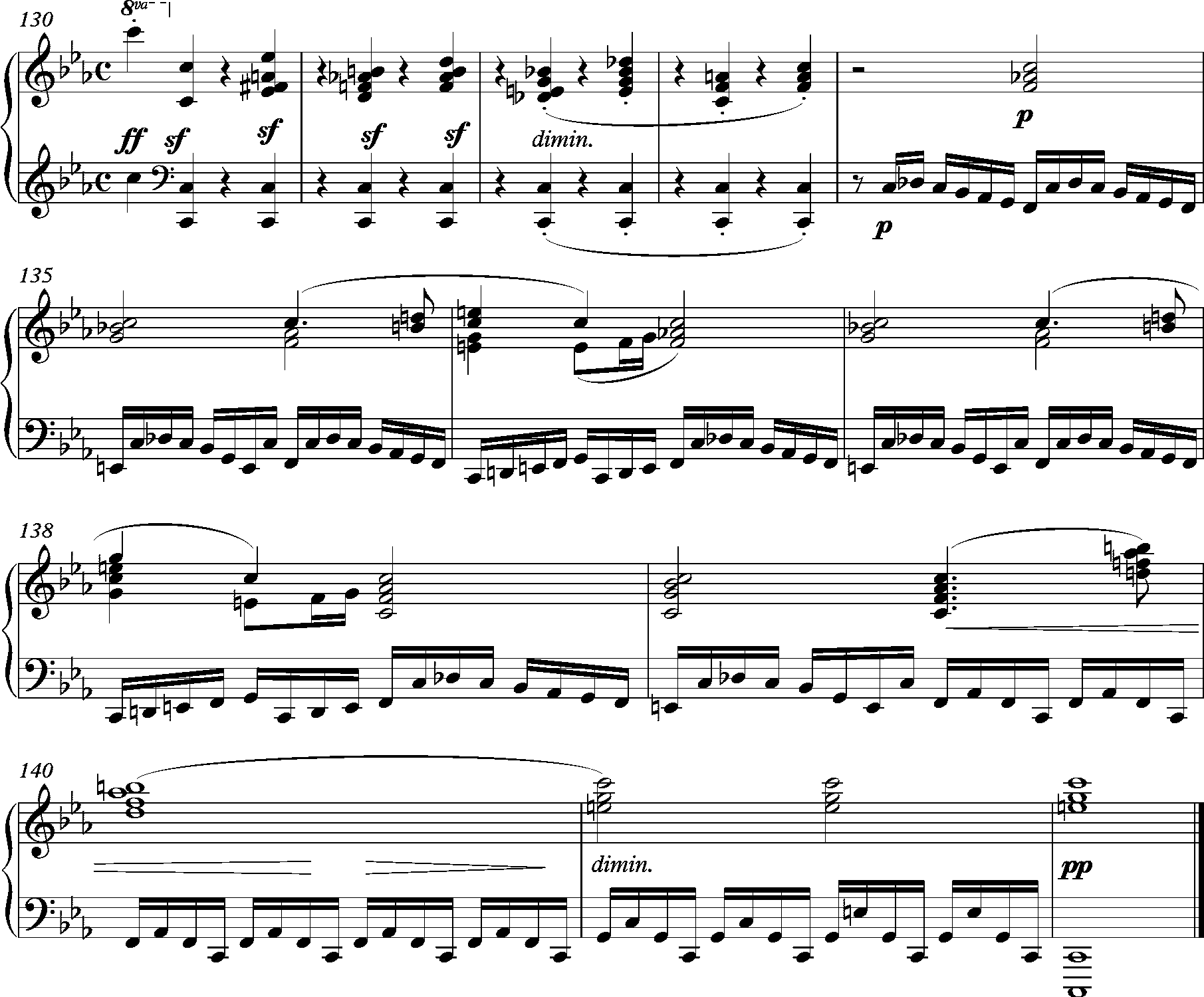
Beethoven, Piano Sonata, Op. 111, first movement concluding bars

The switch from minor to major was a device used frequently and to great expressive effect by Schubert in both his songs and instrumental works. In his book on the song cycle Winterreise, singer Ian Bostridge speaks of the "quintessentially Schubertian effect in the final verse" of the opening song "Gute Nacht", "as the key shifts magically from minor to major".

Schubert, "Gute Nacht", piano link to final verse

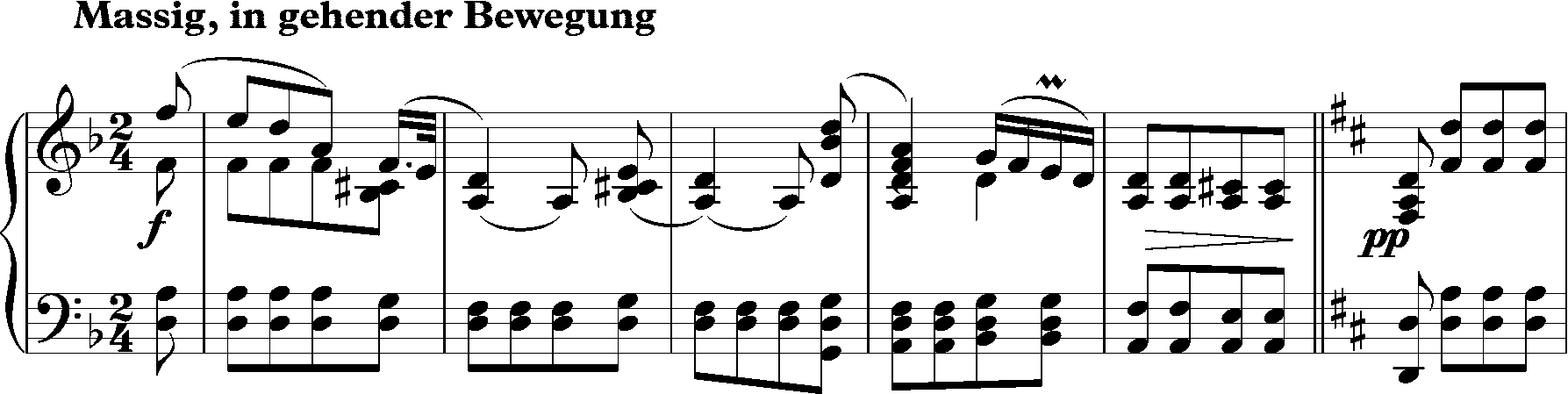
Schubert, "Gute Nacht", piano link to the final verse

Susan Wollenberg describes how the first movement of Schubert's Fantasia in F minor for piano four-hands, D 940, "ends in an extended Tierce de Picardie". The subtle change from minor to major occurs in the bass at the beginning of bar 103:

Schubert Fantasia in F minor bars 98–106

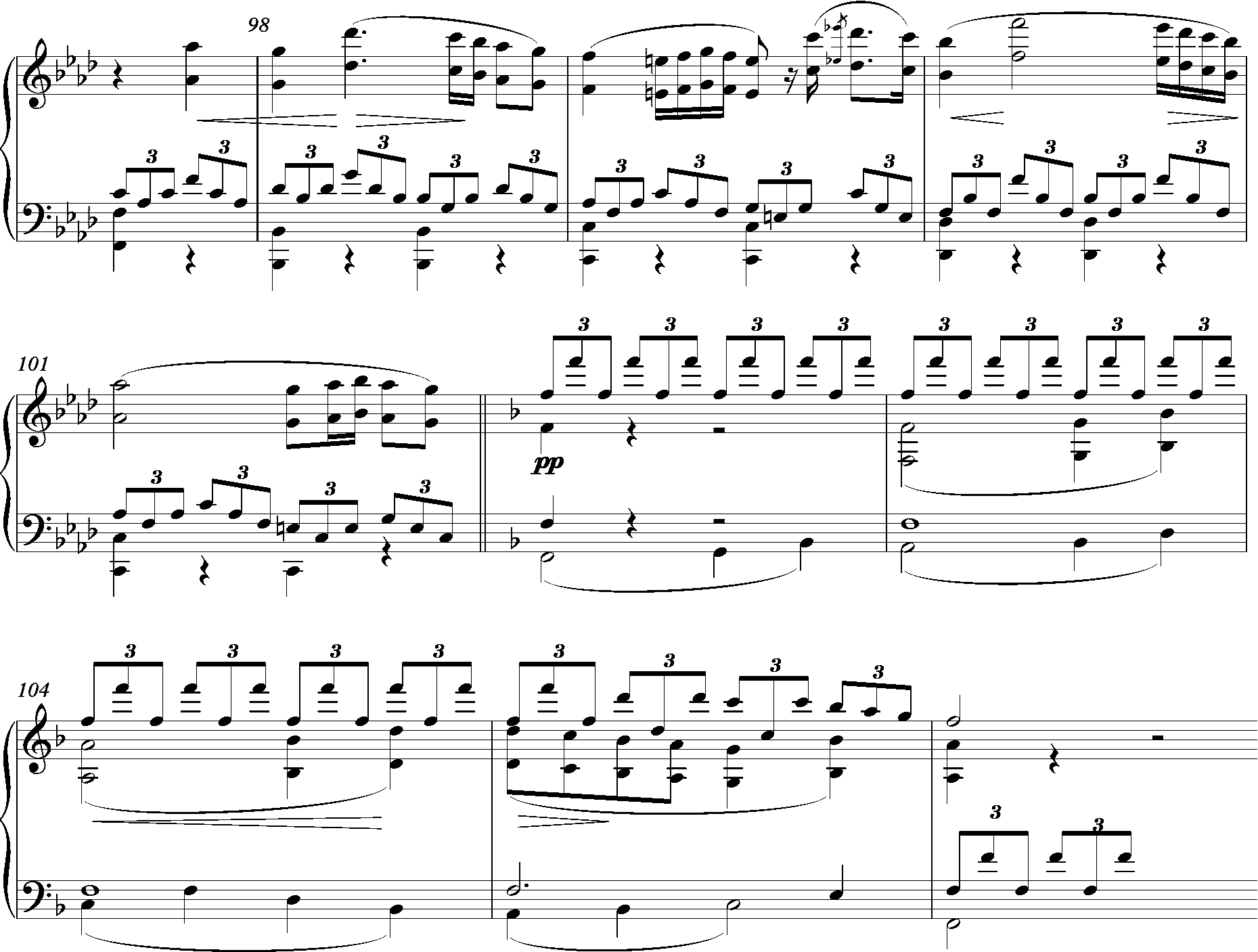
Schubert Fantasia in F minor bars 98–106

In the Romantic era, those of Chopin's nocturnes that are in a minor key almost always end with a Picardy third. A notable structural employment of this device occurs with the finale of the Tchaikovsky Fifth Symphony, where the motto theme makes its first appearance in the major mode.

== Interpretation ==
According to James Bennighof: "Replacing an expected final minor chord with a major chord in this way is a centuries-old technique—the raised third of the chord, in this case G♯ rather than G natural, was first dubbed a 'Picardy third' (tierce de Picarde) in print by Jean-Jacques Rousseau in 1797 ... to express [the idea that] hopefulness might seem unremarkable, or even clichéd."

== Notable examples ==
- The Christian hymn tune "Picardy", often sung with the text "Let All Mortal Flesh Keep Silence", is based on a French carol from the 17th century or earlier. It is in a minor key, but the final chord is changed to major on the final verse.
- (Unknown) – "Coventry Carol" (written not later than 1591). Modern harmonisations of this carol include the famously distinctive finishing major Picardy third in the melody, but the original 1591 harmonisation went much further with this device, including Picardy thirds at seven of the twelve tonic cadences notated, including all three such cadences in its chorus.
- The Band – "This Wheel's On Fire", composed by Rick Danko and Bob Dylan, and appearing on both Music from Big Pink and The Basement Tapes, is in A minor and resolves to an A major chord at the end of the chorus.
- The Beatles – "I'll Be Back", from the soundtrack album of the film A Hard Day's Night. Ian MacDonald speaks of the way "Lennon is harmonised by McCartney in shifting major and minor thirds, resolving on a Picardy third at the end of the first and second verses". Their song And I Love Her, which during the second half is in the key of F, for which the relative minor key is D minor, ends with a D major chord.
- Beethoven – Hammerklavier, slow movement
- Brahms – Piano Trio No. 1, scherzo
- Wolfgang Amadeus Mozart - Lacrimosa from Requiem in D Minor K.626 (Süssmayr completion) is in the tonic key of D minor, where the final cadence ends on a D Major chord.
- Sarah Connor – "From Sarah with Love", final cadence
- Coots and Gillespie, "You Go to My Head". Ted Gioia describes the song as starting "in the major key, but from the second bar onward, Mr. Coots seems intent on creating a feverish dream quality tending more to the minor mode" before finally reaching a cadence in the major.
- Dvořák – New World Symphony, finale
- Bob Dylan – "Ain't Talkin'", the final song on Modern Times (2006), is played in E minor but ends (and ends the album) with a ringing E major chord.
- Roberta Flack – "Killing Me Softly with His Song" ending and resolution. According to Flack: "My classical background made it possible for me to try a number of things with [the song's arrangement]. I changed parts of the chord structure and chose to end on a major chord. [The song] wasn't written that way."
- Oliver Nelson – "Stolen Moments", from the 1961 album The Blues and the Abstract Truth; Ted Gioia sees "the brief resolve into the tonic major in bar four of the melody" as "a clever hook... one of the many interesting twists" in this jazz composition.
- Joni Mitchell – "Tin Angel", from Clouds (1969); the Picardy third lands on the lyric "I found someone to love today". According to Katherine Monk, the Picardy third in this song, "suggests Mitchell is internally aware of romantic love's inability to provide true happiness but, gosh darn it, it's a nice illusion all the same."
- Donna Summer – "I Feel Love" (1977) alternates throughout with an accompaniment of "synth swirls: major and minor; it’s basically a version of what Franz Schubert did for his whole career."
- The Fireballs – "Vaquero", This (1961) Tex-Mex instrumental composed by George Tomsco and Norman Petty is in the key of E minor, and yet ends with a ringing E Major chord.
- Hall & Oates – "Maneater"; each verse has a Picardy third in the middle, moving from a major seventh in the second measure to a flat second in the third measure, and finally ending on a major first in the fourth measure. In the song's original key of B minor, this is an A major chord to a C major chord, ending on a B major chord.
- The Turtles – "Happy Together" (1967) alternates between major and minor keys with the last chord of the outro featuring a Picardy third.
- The Zombies - "Time of the Season", from the 1968 album Odessey and Oracle, is in E minor with each chorus ending on an E major chord.
- Henryk Górecki's Symphony No. 3 op 36, also known as the Symphony of Sorrowful Songs, ends in a positive major third contrasting with the preceding greater part of the work.
- Pink Floyd's "Shine On You Crazy Diamond" concludes with a sudden switch to a major key.
- In The Legend of Zelda: Ocarina of Time, several ocarina songs end with a Picardy third. Specifically, all minor Ocarina songs that can be used to teleport to a temple end in the respective major chord (Bolero of Fire, Nocturne of Shadow and Requiem of Spirit). Serenade of Water is written in D dorian, and again ends in a D major chord, which makes for a "modal to major" example of the Picardy third.
- Yes - "Roundabout", from the 1971 album Fragile, is in E minor but concludes with an E major chord on the acoustic guitar.
- Hello by Lionel Richie also ends on a major chord.

== See also ==
- List of major/minor compositions
