= Viviane (Chausson) =

Symphonic poem by Ernest Chausson

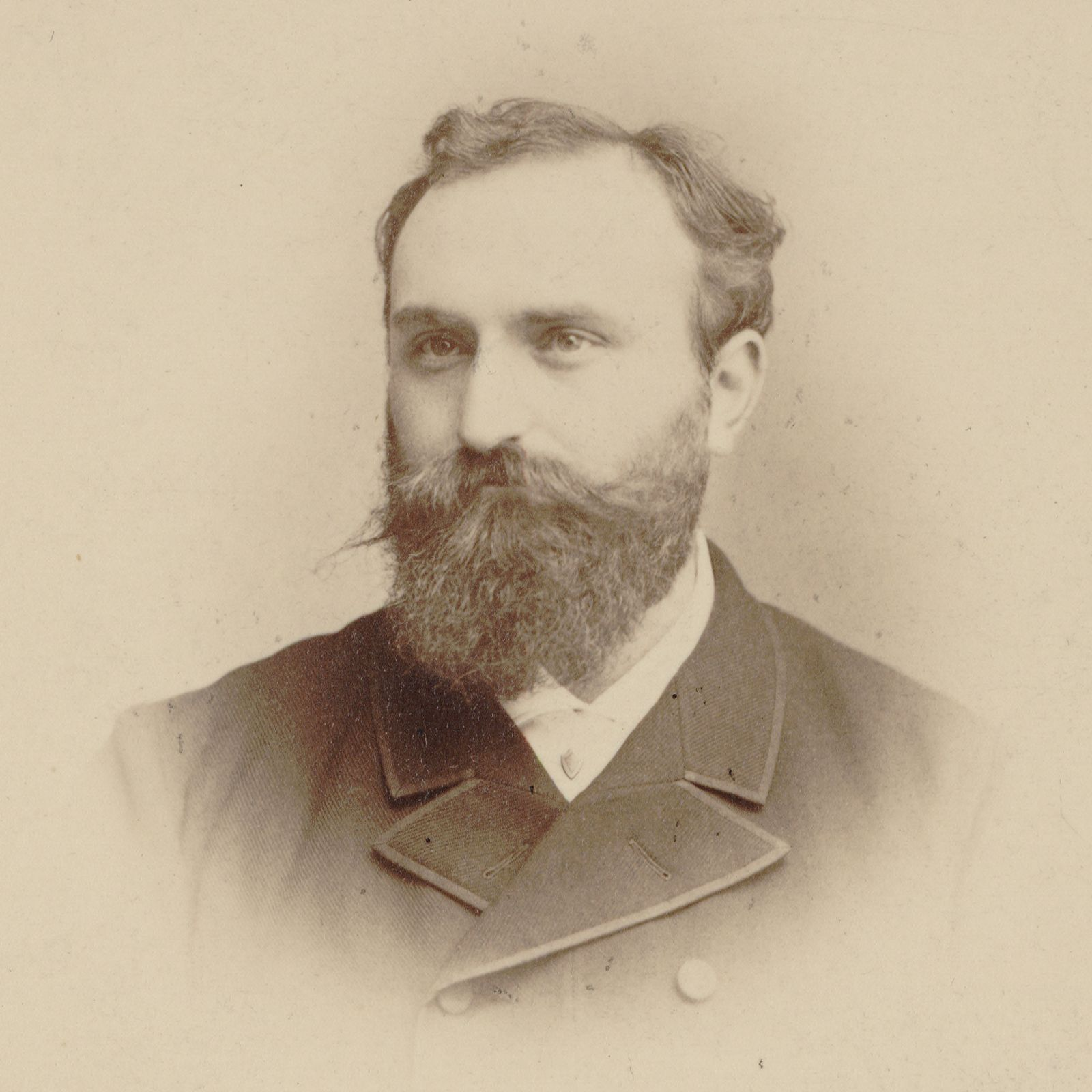
Ernest Chausson, photo by P. Frois, Biarritz, ca. 1885

Viviane, Op. 5, is a symphonic poem by the French composer Ernest Chausson. Chausson's first true composition for orchestra, Viviane was begun in September 1882 and influenced by the music of César Franck and Richard Wagner, just after Chausson had attended the world premiere of the latter's last opera Parsifal at Bayreuth.

Named after the fairy Viviane of Arthurian legend, Chausson's piece concentrates on the episode of her affair with the wizard Merlin in the forest of Broncéliande. Chausson's deep interest in Arthurian legend would lead him to spend many years finishing the only opera of his career, Le roi Arthus, Op. 23 (1886–95).

Chausson completed Viviane in December 1882 and dedicated it to Jeanne Escudier, whom he was going to marry in June. The work was premiered at a concert of the Société Nationale de Musique in the Salle Érard on 31 March 1883, conducted by Édouard Colonne, which also featured the premiere of Franck's Le Chasseur maudit. In 1887, Chausson made a major reorchestration of Viviane, which was first presented by Charles Lamoureux on 29 January 1888.
