= Piano Sextet (Mendelssohn) =

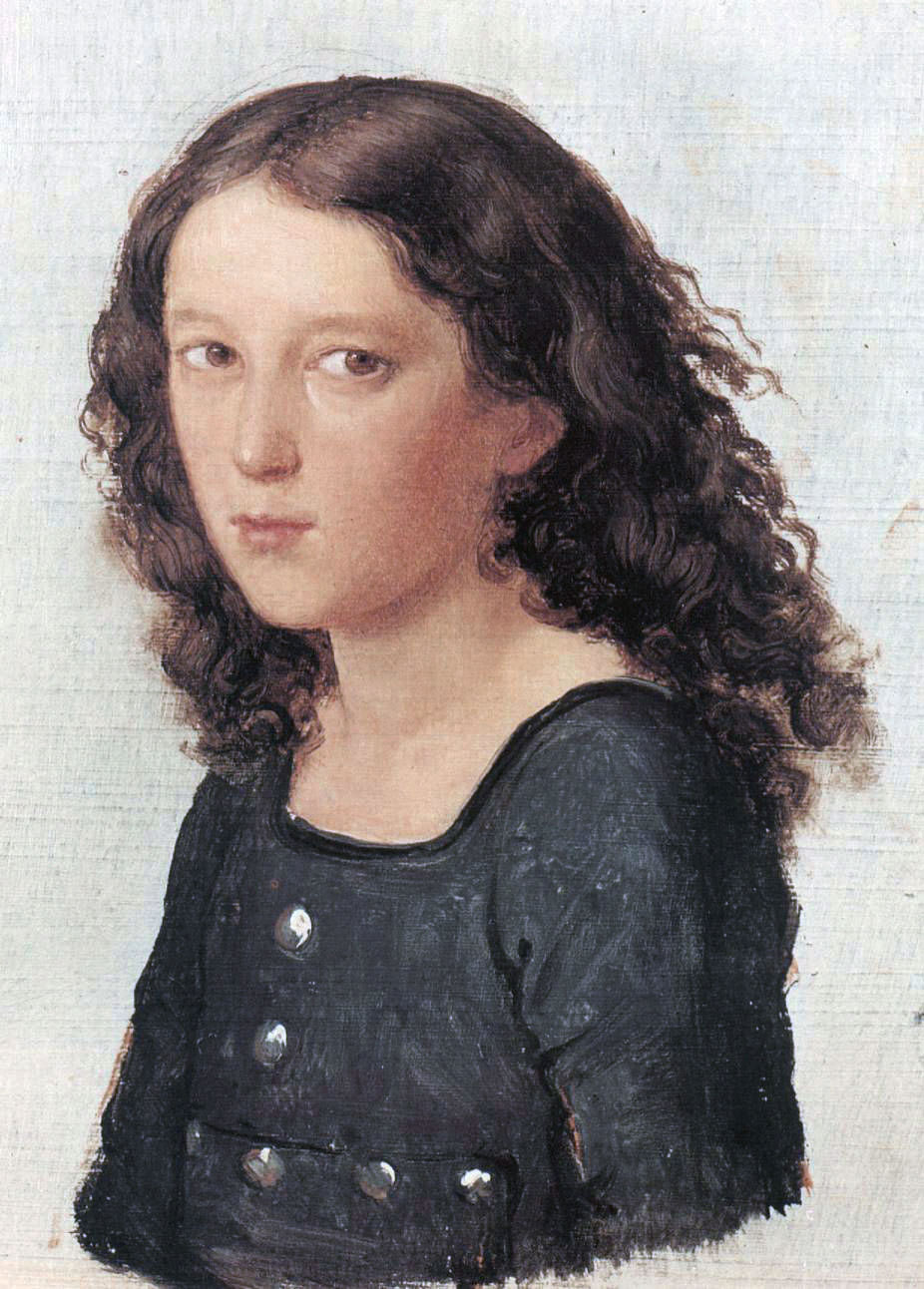
Felix Mendelssohn aged 12 (1821) by Carl Joseph Begas

Felix Mendelssohn's Piano Sextet in D major, Op. 110, MWV Q 16, for piano, violin, two violas, cello, and double bass was composed in April–May 1824, when Mendelssohn was only 15, the same time he was working on a comic opera Die Hochzeit des Camacho. Its composition took place between the Viola Sonata and the Piano Quartet No. 3. It also preceded the famous Octet, Op. 20 by about a year. 1824 is also the probable year of the composition of the Clarinet Sonata. Like the latter, the Sextet was not published during the composer's lifetime. Its first edition was issued in 1868 as a part of a complete collection of Mendelssohn's works, hence the misleadingly high opus number.

The composer's autograph of the score (in his Nachlass at the Berlin State Library) has a date at the end of it: May 10, 1824. The manuscript is relatively clean and contains too few corrections to let us track the evolution of the work. It is also never mentioned in Mendelssohn's letters.

The scoring, tipping the balance of the strings toward the darker and lower registers, gives the piano a dominating position in most of the piece. This makes the Sextet more of a chamber piano concerto than a pure chamber piece. This scoring is reminiscent of Johann Nepomuk Hummel's Septet No. 1 in D minor, Op.74 (for piano, flute, oboe, horn, viola, cello and double bass) of 1816, which was issued in a version for piano, violin, viola, cello and double bass (not a unique, but also not a common scoring at that time, the most popular composition for which is Franz Schubert's Trout Quintet of 1819). However, in Mendelssohn's Sextet a second viola is added to this ensemble. Such scoring can be found in Ferdinand Ries's undated Sextet in C major, WoO 76 and Henri Bertini's Sextets Nos. 4 and 5 (1830s–1840s).

No performances for this work during the composer's lifetime are documented.

== Structure ==
The work has four movements:

1. Allegro vivace (D major, 4/4)
2. Adagio (F♯ major, 3/4)
3. Menuetto. Agitato (D minor, 6/8) – Trio (F major)
4. Allegro vivace (D major, 4/4) — Allegro con fuoco (a reminiscence of the minuet, D minor) — Allegro con fuoco (D minor, ends with a long Picardy third)

A typical performance of the work takes around 30–32 minutes.
