= Sextet (Penderecki) =

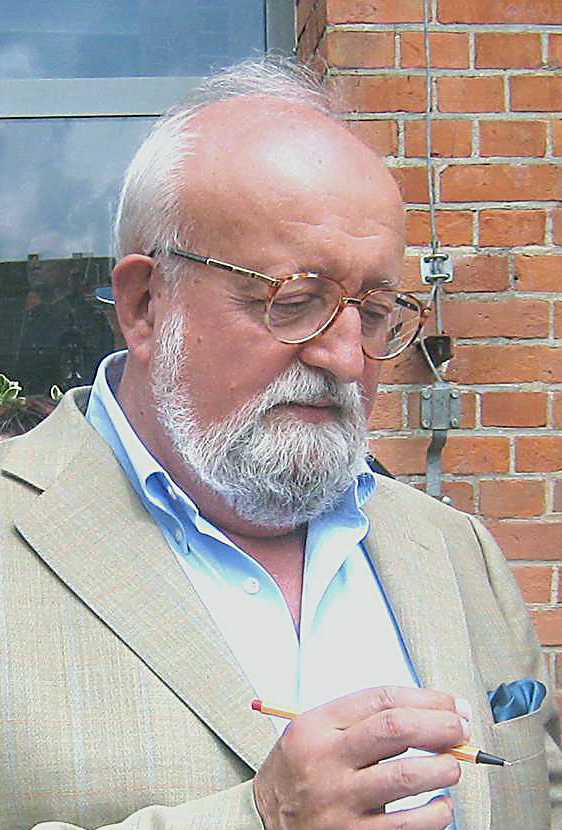
Krzysztof Penderecki

The Sextet is a two-movement composition for clarinet, horn, violin, viola, cello, and piano by Polish composer Krzysztof Penderecki. The composition was written in 2000 and is, according to some critics, the composer's most substantial chamber work.

== Composition ==
This composition takes approximately 30 minutes to perform. The movement list is as follows:

1. Allegro moderato
2. Larghetto

Given its very unusual nature, for Penderecki's chamber music is rare, the melodic lines of this composition are very well defined, because Penderecki usually writes scores for large orchestras and ensembles. This work is remarkable for its chromatic scales, present all along the piece.

This sextet was commissioned by Auftragswerk der Gesellschaft der Musikfreunde and was eventually premiered on June 7, 2000 in Vienna's Musikverein by Paul Meyer (clarinet), Radovan Vlatkovic (horn), Julian Rachlin (violin), Yuri Bashmet (viola), fellow musician Mstislav Rostropovich (cello), and Dmitri Alexeev (piano).
