= Sextet (Poulenc) =

Sextuor Sextet
- Chamber music by Francis Poulenc
- Catalogue: FP 100
- Composed: 1931–32
- Scoring: piano; wind quintet

Francis Poulenc's Sextuor (Sextet), FP 100, is a chamber music piece written for a standard wind quintet (flute, oboe, clarinet, bassoon, and French horn) and piano. Estimates about the time of its composition range from between 1931 and 1932 and 1932 alone. It received its debut in 1933 but was later revised in 1939. Performed in its entirety, the three-movement piece lasts approximately 18 minutes.

== Background ==
Francis Poulenc, though rejected by the director of the Paris Conservatoire for the tendency of his compositional style to be overly progressive, was the most prolific member of the group of 20th-century French composers known as Les Six. In his Sextet there are obvious influences of the incidental music heard during the group's weekend visits to the circus as well as their general adherence to the melodic precedents set forth by Satie. Poulenc composed the piece around the same time as his cantata Le Bal Masqué and Concerto for Two Pianos.

== Structure and analysis ==
=== I. Allegro Vivace ===
The first movement is in ternary form and begins with ascending scales by all instruments before transferring into an energetic beginning section with complex rhythms, jazz undertones, and an underlying line from the piano. The middle of the movement features a slower section initiated by a bassoon melody which is then repeated by the other instruments. The original tempo returns at the end of the movement as new themes barrel toward the finish.

=== II. Divertissement: Andantino ===
The second movement is in rounded binary form, with the "A" sections marked at a much slower tempo than the "B" section. It is often interpreted as being influenced by the divertimentos of the Classical period while at the same time serving as a parody of Mozart's slower movements. This is corroborated by Orrin Howard of the Los Angeles Philharmonic, who has written that he views the faster "B" section as a form of musical, comedic relief. The piece employs a variety of textures in the winds with the piano serving in more of a secondary role.

=== III. Finale: Prestissimo ===
The finale begins with "an Offenbachian gallop" and is in rondo form. It has jazz and ragtime influences (again a product of Les Six's outings to weekend shows), and has been interpreted as a satirical depiction of the neoclassical movement. The finale creates a sense of cohesion by repeating themes from the previous two movements, and it ends with a lyrical and solemn coda with influences from one of the composer's idols, Maurice Ravel.

== Premiere, reception, and revision ==
The premier of the sextet occurred in 1933 with Poulenc on the piano part and Marcel Moyse, Roland Lamorlette, Louis Cahuzac, Gustave Dhérin, and R. Blot on flute, oboe, clarinet, bassoon, and horn, respectively. The piece was not well-received by traditionalists in the music community, with composer and critic Florent Schmitt of Le Temps criticizing it as wandering and vulgar. A more positive review came from André George of Les Nouvelles littéraires, who wrote that "with Poulenc, all of France comes out of the windows he opens." In the composer's later life, he performed the piece with the Philadelphia Woodwind Quintet, composed of members of the Philadelphia Orchestra, including John de Lancie.

Poulenc extensively revised the composition in August 1939 because he was dissatisfied with the original work. He told composer and conductor Nadia Boulanger, "There were some good ideas in [the original] but the whole thing was badly put together. With the proportions altered, better balanced, it comes over very clearly."

== Notable recordings ==
- The Fairfield Chamber Group, 1951
- The New York Woodwind Quintet, 1961
- The Berlin Philharmonic Wind Quintet, 2009

== Bibliography ==
- Schmidt, Carl B. (1995). The Music of Francis Poulenc (1899–1963): A Catalogue. Oxford: Clarendon Press. ISBN 978-0-19-816336-7.
