= Radovan Vlatković =

Croatian hornist (born 1962)

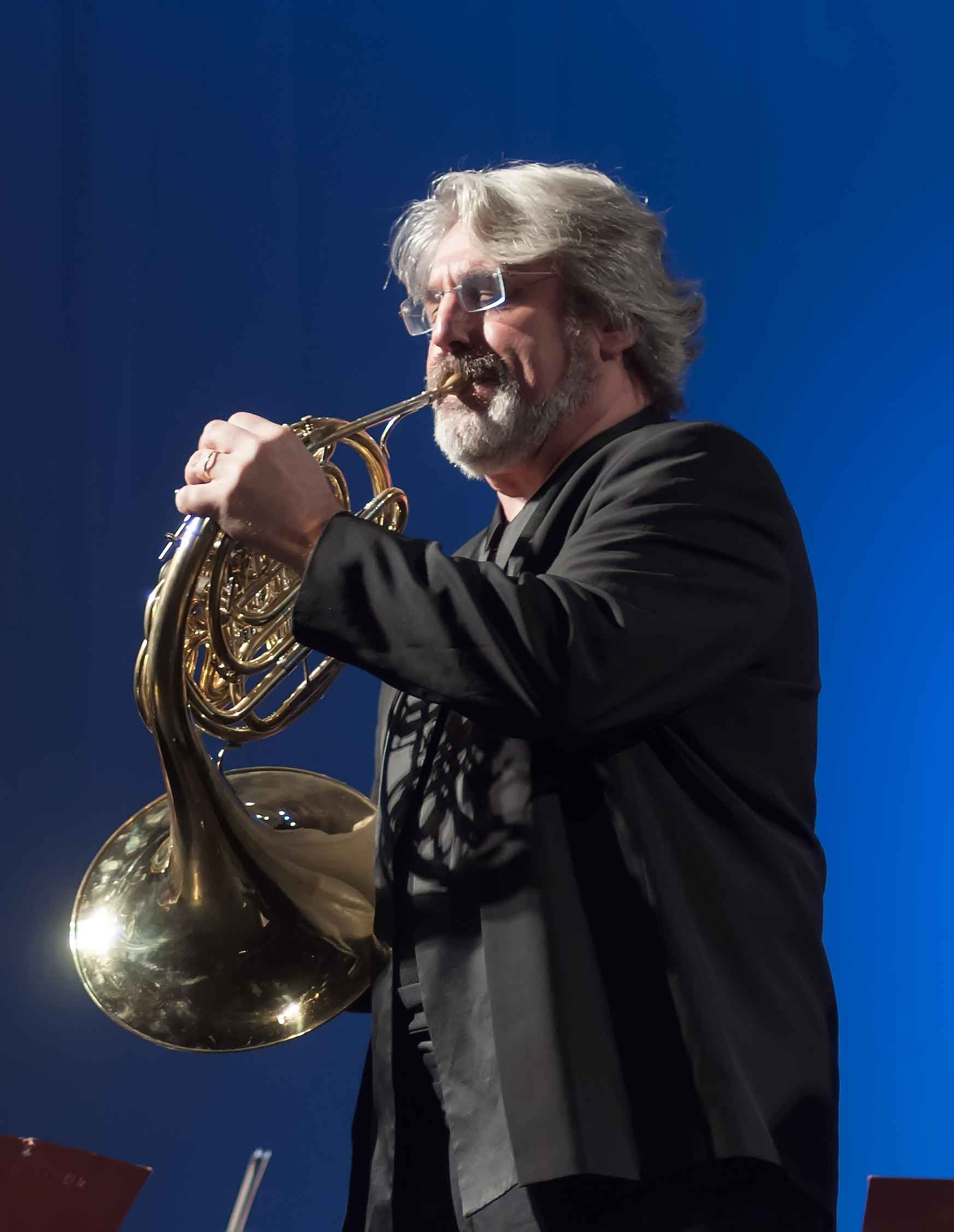
Radovan Vlatković (2018)

Radovan Vlatković (born 1962) is a Croatian-born horn player. He was the former principal horn of the Berlin Radio Symphony Orchestra (now Deutsches Symphonie-Orchester Berlin). He left that post in 1990 to devote himself to a solo career and has recorded many of the major works for horn. He is now professor of horn at the Mozarteum in Salzburg, Austria and at the Reina Sofía School of Music in Madrid. Vlatković also participates as a senior artist at the Marlboro Music Festival, and has performed in chamber music and solo recital for the Philadelphia Chamber Music Society and Chamber Music Society of Lincoln Center.

As a student Vlatković claimed prizes at the International Horn Competition in Liége, Belgium, at the 12th Yugoslavian Music Competition and at the "Premio Ancona" Competition in Italy. When Vlatković was awarded the First Prize at the ARD International Competition in Munich in 1983, it had not been awarded to a horn player for 14 years.

As a soloist Vlatković has travelled most of the European continent, America, Canada, Mexico, Israel, the Near East, East Africa, Japan and Australia. Among his appearances he has performed with the Thailand Phil, Radio Symphony Orchestra of Berlin, the Bavarian Radio Symphony Orchestra, the BBC Symphony Orchestra, the English Chamber Orchestra, the Academy of Saint Martin in the Fields, the Camerata Academica des Mozarteums, and in Japan with the Yomiuri Nippon Symphony Orchestra, Tokyo Metropolitan Symphony Orchestra and the NHK Symphony Orchestra.

From 1982 to 1990 Radovan Vlatković was the principal horn at the Berlin Radio Symphony Orchestra. He left the orchestra to devote himself fully to solo works. In 1992 he accepted a professorship at the "Staatliche Hochschule für Musik und Darstellende Kunst" at Stuttgart.

Since 1998 he has been a professor at the Mozarteum in Salzburg. For EMI Classics he has recorded, together with the English Chamber Orchestra under Jeffrey Tate, all the Concertos for Horn by W.A. Mozart and Richard Strauss. His recording of the Mozart Concertos for Horn was awarded the German Record Critics' Award.

Vlatković played the first performances of works by Elliott Carter, Sofia Gubaidulina and Heinz Holliger, and he premiered the Horn Concerto (2008) written for him by Krzysztof Penderecki.

In 2014 Vlatković received an Honorary Membership of the Royal Academy of Music (Hon RAM).

He is married to Dinka Migic-Vlatković, mother of their six children. He lives in Salzburg, Austria with his family.
