= Ernest Chausson =

French composer (1855–1899)

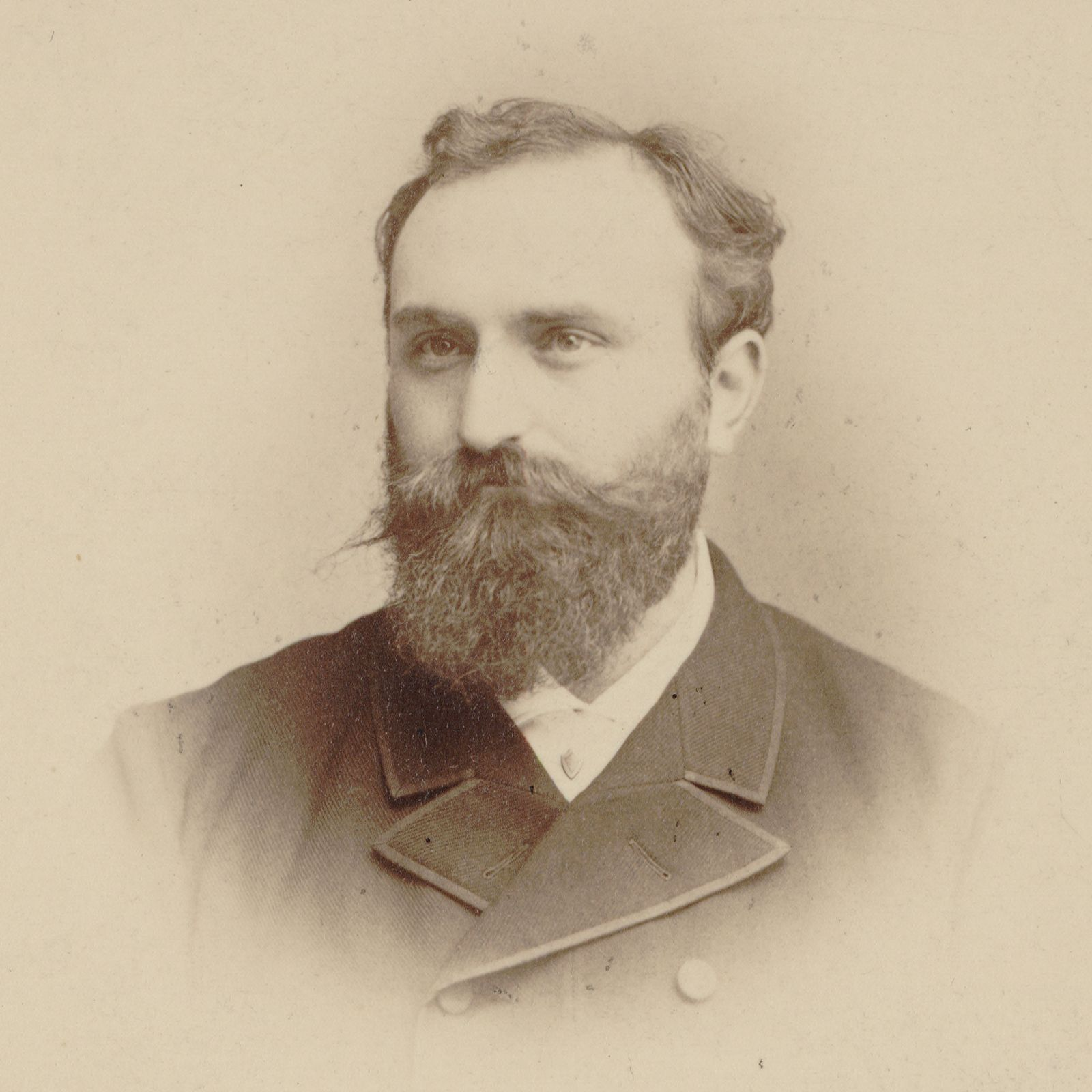
Ernest Chausson, cabinet card photo by P. Frois, Biarritz (France), ca. 1885, Bibliothèque nationale de France

Amédée-Ernest Chausson (French: [ʃosɔ̃]; 20 January 1855 – 10 June 1899) was a French Romantic composer.

== Life ==
Born in Paris into an affluent bourgeois family, Chausson was the sole surviving child of a building contractor who made his fortune assisting Baron Haussmann in the redevelopment of Paris in the 1850s. To please his father, Chausson studied law and was appointed a barrister for the Court of Appeals, but had little or no interest in the profession. He frequented the Paris salons, where he met celebrities such as Henri Fantin-Latour, Odilon Redon, and Vincent d'Indy. Before deciding on a musical career, he dabbled in writing and drawing.

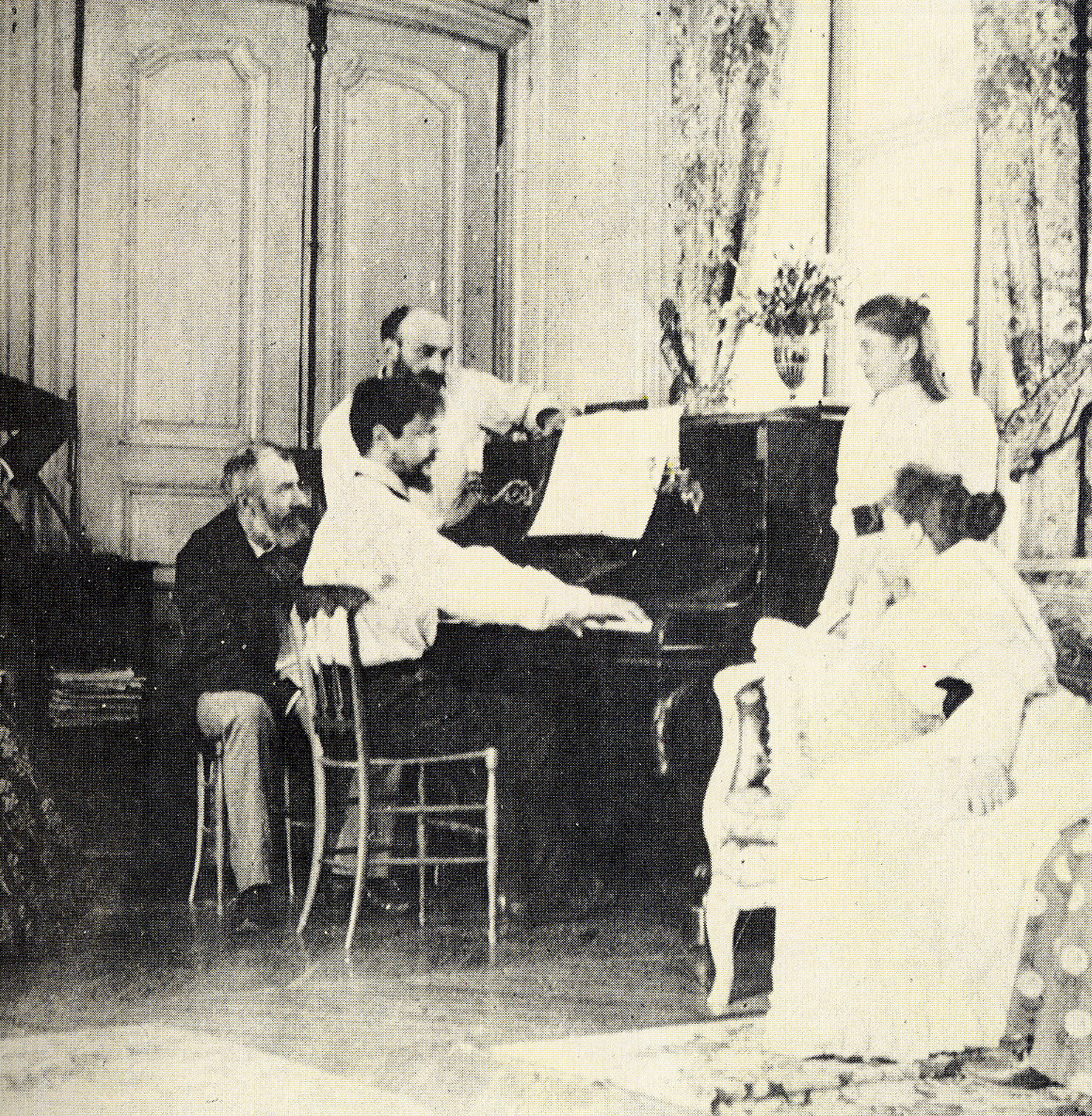
Chausson page-turning for Debussy, Luzancy, 1893

In 1879, at the age of 24, he began attending the composition classes of Jules Massenet at the Paris Conservatoire; Massenet came to regard him as "an exceptional person and a true artist". He had already composed some piano pieces and songs. However, the earliest manuscripts that have been preserved are those corrected by Massenet. At the Conservatoire, Chausson also studied with César Franck, with whom he formed a close friendship that lasted until Franck's death in 1890. Chausson interrupted his studies in 1881 after a failed attempt to win the Prix de Rome.

During 1882 and 1883, Chausson, who enjoyed travel, visited Bayreuth to hear the operas of Richard Wagner. On the first of these journeys, he went with d'Indy for the premiere of Wagner's Parsifal, and on the second trip he went with his new spouse, Jeanne Escudier (1862–1936), with whom he was to have five children.

From 1886 until his death in 1899, Chausson was secretary of the Société Nationale de Musique. In his own home (22 Boulevard de Courcelles, near Parc Monceau), he received artists, including the composers Henri Duparc, Gabriel Fauré, Claude Debussy, and Isaac Albéniz; poet Stéphane Mallarmé; Russian novelist Ivan Turgenev; and Impressionist painter Claude Monet. Chausson also assembled a collection of paintings.

== Death ==
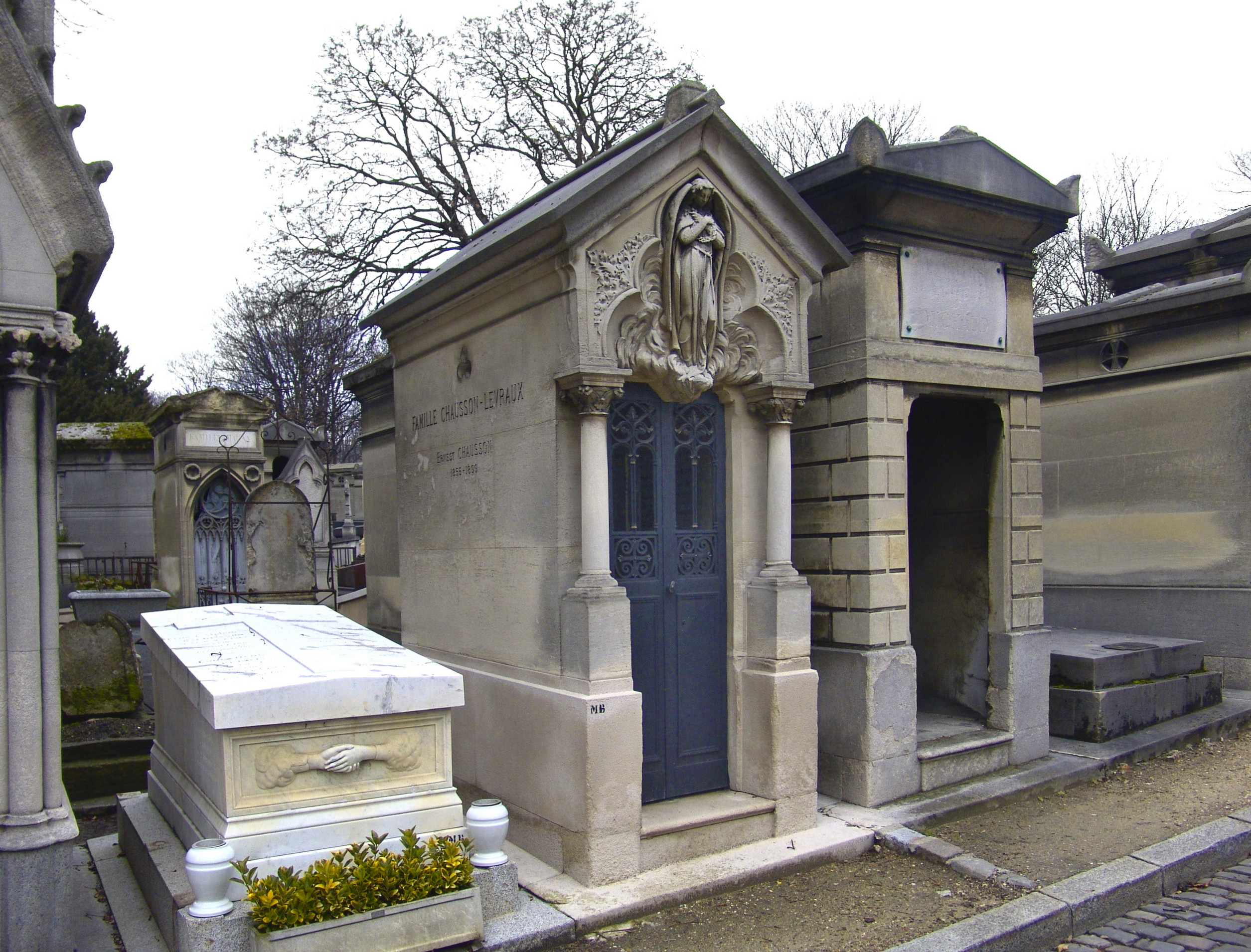
Chausson's tomb, Père Lachaise Cemetery, Paris

When 44 years old, Chausson died while staying at one of his country retreats, the Château de Moussets, in Limay, Yvelines. Riding his bicycle downhill, Chausson hit a brick wall and died instantly. The exact circumstances remain unclear; although probably an accident, there has been the suggestion of suicide, as Chausson was prone to depression. This suicide theory was propounded by Debussy's biographer Edward Lockspeiser, but has been rejected more recently by Chausson's own biographer Ralph Scott Grover. When he was 20, Chausson jotted into his diary "I have the premonition that my life will be short. I'm far from complaining about it, but I should not want to die before having done something."

Chausson was buried in Père Lachaise Cemetery in Paris. His funeral was attended by figures of the arts, including Duparc, Gabriel Fauré, Isaac Albéniz, Redon, Edgar Degas, Auguste Rodin, Henri de Régnier, Pierre Louÿs and Claude Debussy. Although Chausson's brotherly relationship with Debussy had ended abruptly five years earlier, following his disapproval of Debussy's promiscuity, Debussy never ceased to admire Chausson's music.

== Eponymy ==
A small park, Square Ernest-Chausson, in the 17th arrondissement of Paris is named in his honour.

== Music ==
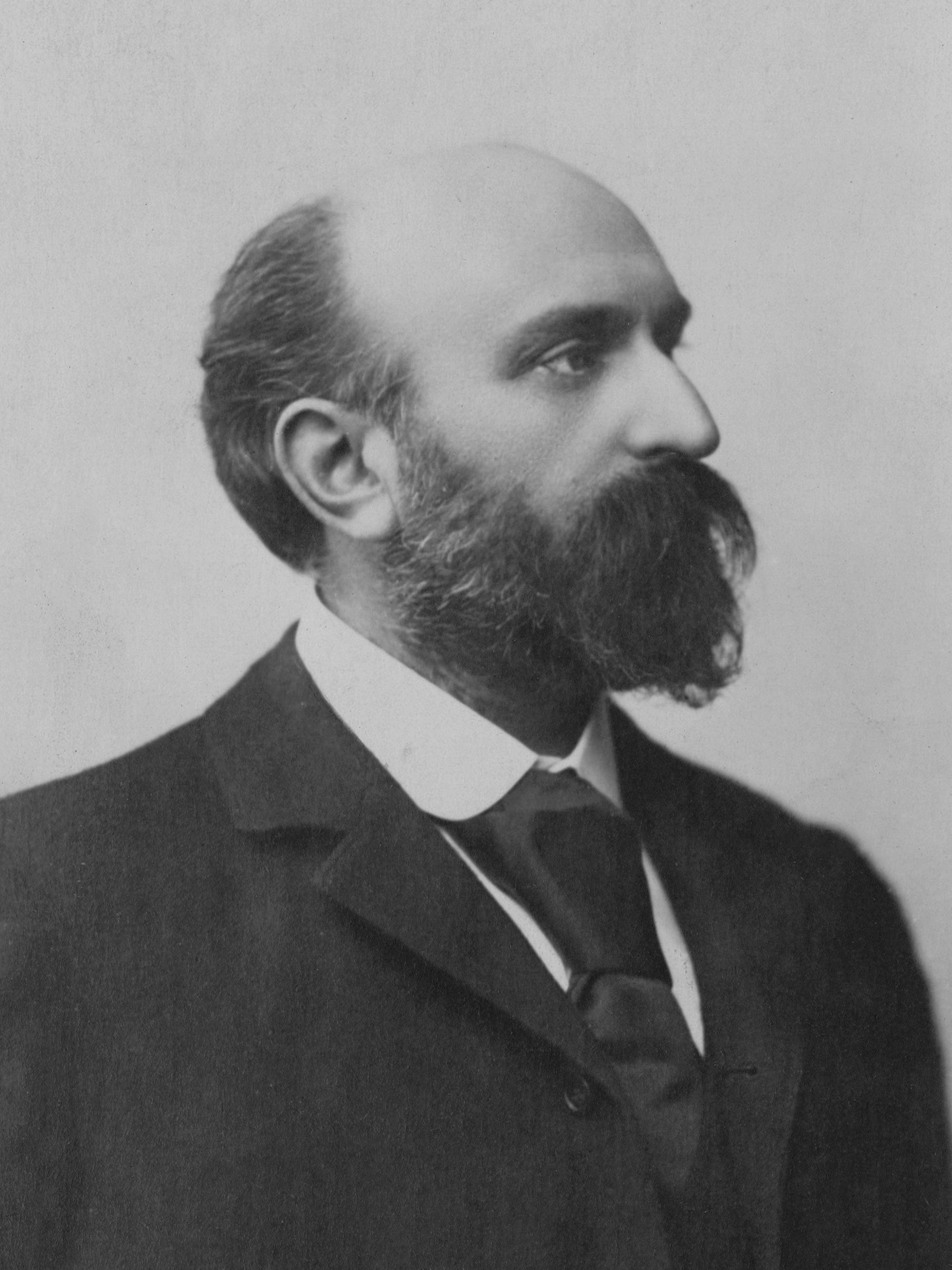
Ernest Chausson, photograph by Guy & Mockel, Paris, ca. 1897, Bibliothèque nationale de France.

The creative work of Chausson is commonly divided into three periods. In the first, his output was stylistically dominated by the influence of Massenet. The second period, dating from 1886, is marked by a more dramatic character, deriving partly from Chausson's contacts with the artistic milieux in which he moved. From his father's death in 1894 dates the beginning of his third period, during which he was especially influenced by his reading of the symbolist poets and Russian literature, particularly Turgenev, Dostoyevsky, and Tolstoy.

Chausson's work is individual, but it does reflect some technical influences of both Wagner and his other musical hero, Franck. Stylistic traces not only of Massenet but also of Brahms can be detected sometimes. In general, Chausson's compositional idiom bridges the gap between the ripe Romanticism of Massenet and Franck and the more introverted Impressionism of Debussy.

Several delicate songs came from Chausson's pen. He completed one opera, Le roi Arthus (King Arthur). His orchestral output was small, but significant. It includes the symphonic poem Viviane; the Symphony in B-flat, his sole symphony; Poème for violin and orchestra, an important piece in the violin repertoire; and the dramatic song-cycle Poème de l'amour et de la mer.

Chausson is believed to be the first composer to use the celesta. He employed that instrument in December 1888 in his incidental music, written for a small orchestra, for La Tempête, a French translation by Maurice Bouchor of Shakespeare's The Tempest.

Not at all prolific, Chausson left behind only 39 opus-numbered pieces.

"There are moments when I feel myself driven by a kind of feverish instinct, as if I had the presentiment of being unable to attain my goal, or of attaining it too late." Ernest Chausson

== Bibliography ==
- Charles Oulmont (), Musique de l'amour. I. Ernest Chausson et "la bande à Franck" (Paris: Desclée de Brouwer & Cie., 1935).
- Jean Gallois, Ernest Chausson (Paris: Fayard, 1994).
- Le Doussal, Florence (2000). "Maurice Denis et Ernest Chausson: Deux âmes fraternelles éprises d'absolu". Music in Art: International Journal for Music Iconography. 25 (1–2): 103–114. ISSN 1522-7464.
