= Trois Chorals =

Musical composition for Pipe Organ

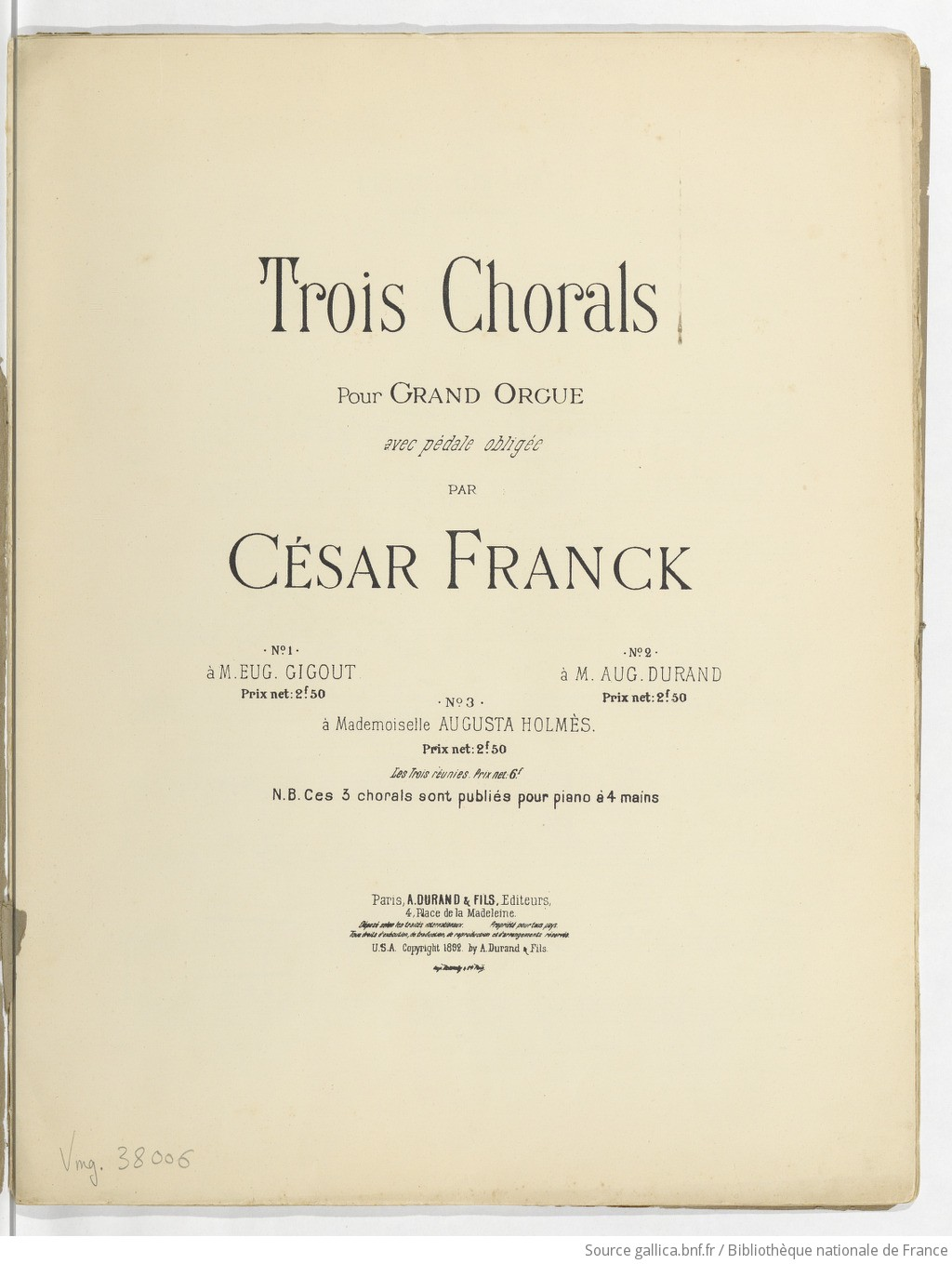
Title page, first edition, 1892

The Trois Chorals are a three-part composition for organ solo by French composer and organist César Franck from 1890. Together with the Quintet (1879), the Prélude, Choral et Fugue (piano, 1884), the Variations symphoniques (piano and orchestra, 1885), the Sonate (violin and piano, 1886) and the Symphonie en ré mineur (1886–1888), among the masterpieces of his late creative period.

The Trois Chorals consist of:

- Choral I (in E major)
- Choral II (in B minor)
- Choral III (in A minor)

== Origins, manuscripts and publication ==
César Franck began composing the Trois Chorals in the summer of 1890 in Nemours, south of Paris. He completed the first draft of Choral III on September 30 and died on November 8, 1890, from complications arising from a traffic accident he had suffered in Paris in July of that year.

Although Franck did not have the opportunity to play the Trois Chorals himself in public, to teach them, or to accompany their printing and publication, there are contemporary accounts by Louis Vierne and Charles Tournemire of private performances of the works (piano four hands) with his students.

In his critical edition of all César Franck's organ and harmonium works, British organist and musicologist Richard Brasier documents that Franck created three different manuscripts for each of the three chorales: a first draft, a second, more comprehensive draft with corrections, and a fair copy.

According to Brasier, however, the manuscripts that were demonstrably available to the music engraver contain corrections, crossed-out material, missing rests in the pedal system, playing instructions in pencil and ink, and faintly legible registrations in Franck's own hand that have been erased. It is likely that these manuscripts, which were essentially complete (with some rather hasty handwriting, especially in Choral III), were working drafts by the composer. The two fair copies of Choral II and Choral III, which are incomplete in some details, were written in clearly legible handwriting in ink, without corrections, and contain a wealth of details that are not present in the manuscripts for the music engraver. Franck was particularly careful in this regard in Choral II, for example in refining the voice leading between the two hands. In contrast, the fair copy of Choral III lacks registrations and manual indications, suggesting that Franck was unable to complete the work before his death due to his deteriorating health. Brasier emphasizes that only 17 days elapsed between the completion of the draft of Choral III and the diagnosis of a respiratory infection, which led to Franck's death 22 days later.

The published registrations were demonstrably not written by Franck himself, but by another person who has not yet been clearly identified (in French and English), while Franck's original and still faintly recognizable pencil entries (who, in addition to French, also spoke German, but not English) were erased.

The Trois Chorals were published posthumously on January 29, 1892, by Auguste Durand & Fils in Paris.

None of the manuscripts bear a dedication; nevertheless, the Trois Chorals appeared in 1892 with the following dedications:

- Choral I – “A Monsieur Eugène Gigout”
- Choral II – “A Monsieur Auguste Durand”
- Choral III – “A mon élève Augusta Holmès”

Vincent d'Indy reported that the dedications were actually intended for Alexandre Guilmant, Théodore Dubois, and Eugène Gigout. According to Léon Vallas, the composer's son, Georges Franck, replaced the names Guilmant and Dubois with Auguste Durand and Augusta Holmès for unknown reasons. According to Richard Brasier, it is likely that Georges Franck decided which of the existing manuscripts of the Trois Chorals would be used by the publisher Durand for publication after his father's death. In all three cases, the second manuscript versions were selected, which were working drafts for the composer but not the fair copies intended for publication (which Franck was unable to complete due to his health problems, but which contain numerous corrections and changes that are missing in the first two manuscript versions of the Trois Chorals).

== Title and musical form ==
The Trois Chorals do not refer to Gregorian chant or organ arrangements of a chorale, but rather to a free rhapsodic form. In all three pieces, the actual choral theme does not appear at the beginning, but only later on. From the choral theme and other thematic elements, Franck develops complex symphonic forms, each with a playing time of just under 15 minutes. All three chorales contain development sections and end with impressive apotheoses of their themes.

In Franck's Choral II, the reference to Johann Sebastian Bach's Passacaglia in C minor (BWV 582) is obvious when Franck begins with variations on a multi-bar chaconne theme and then develops a fugato from this material. The toccata-like sixteenth-note figures at the beginning of Choral III bear a certain resemblance to the style of the Praeludium in A minor (BWV 543).

Within the Trois Chorals, there are several motivic connections that are characteristic of Franck's multi-movement compositions. In this case, it is a striking motif with an ascending fourth followed by a descending third and second:

- In Choral I from bar 112 and in the central cantilena section in E minor from bar 126.
- In Choral II from bar 80, in the fugato (as a counterpoint to the choral theme) from bar 148, as a leitmotif from bar 226, and in the apotheosis from bar 258 in the pedal.
- In Choral III at the beginning of the choral theme from bar 30, as a derivation of the aforementioned motif.

== Bibliography ==
- César Franck: Intégrale de l’œuvre d’orgue –– Vol. I: Preface & Commentary, ed. Richard Brasier. Tynset, Norway: Lyrebird Music, 2022. ISBN 978-1-917401-00-5.
- César Franck: Intégrale de l’œuvre d’orgue –– Vol. IV: 1878–1890, ed. Richard Brasier. Tynset, Norway: Lyrebird Music, 2022. ISBN 978-1-917401-03-6.
