= Société nationale de musique =

French music organisation

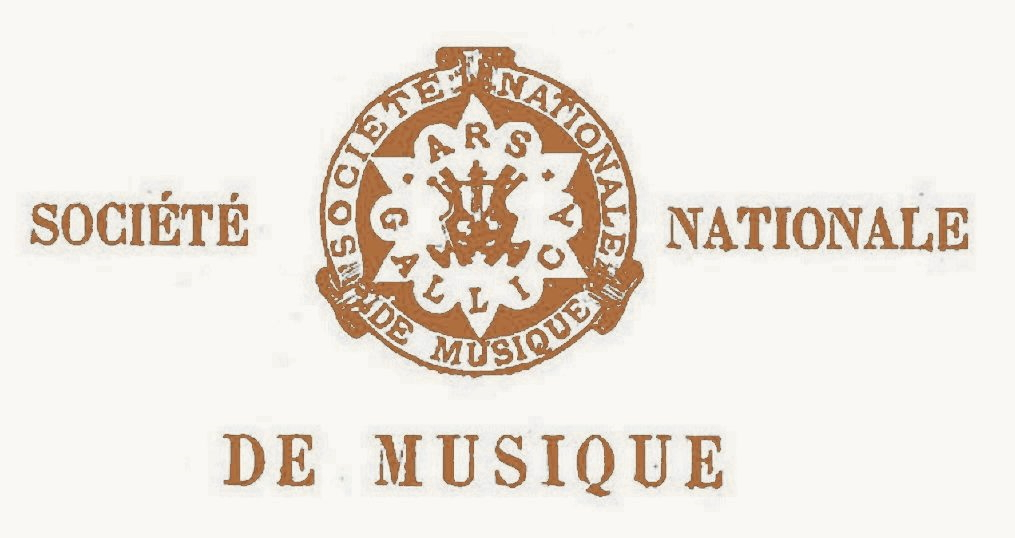
Logo of the society, 1871

The Société nationale de musique was an organisation in late 19th and early 20th century Paris, promoting French music and allowing rising composers to present their works in public. It was founded in the aftermath of France's defeat in the Franco-Prussian War of 1870–71 on a strong tide of nationalist feeling, and at first excluded all music by non-French composers. In its first 30 years it gave the premieres of works by composers including Saint-Saëns, Chabrier, Franck, Fauré, Dukas and Debussy.

In the 1880s the original purely French nature of the society was abandoned, and foreign works and composers were accepted. Under the presidency of Vincent d'Indy the society became increasingly conservative, and a rival organisation, the Société musicale indépendante, was set up in 1910 by Maurice Ravel and others, briefly overshadowing the Société nationale. The rival closed down in 1935; the Société nationale continued until 1939 when it was wound up.

Among the works written for or premiered by the society are Chabrier's Pièces pittoresques, Franck's Variations symphoniques, Fauré's First and Second Piano Quartets and the song-cycle La Bonne chanson, Dukas's L'Apprenti sorcier, and Debussy's String Quartet and Prélude à l'après-midi d'un faune.

== History ==
=== Foundation ===
The society was founded during the Franco-Prussian War of 1870–71. In the brief lull between the ending of the siege of Paris and the rise and fall of the Paris Commune, a group of French musicians met on 25 February 1871 to agree how to promote French music. Before this, French concert halls were dominated by the German symphonic and chamber repertoire; for example, at the popular Pasdeloup concerts between 1861 and 1873, Berlioz and Gounod were programmed 31 times each, and Saint-Saëns 12, compared to 43 performances of Wagner's music and 350 of Beethoven's. A wave of anti-German and nationalist sentiments that arose in the wake of the French defeat made the dominance of German music intolerable to many.

Romain Bussine (top) and Camille Saint-Saëns

The moving forces behind the new society were Romain Bussine, professor of singing at the Paris Conservatoire and the composer Camille Saint-Saëns. An executive committee was formed and had its first meeting on 17 March at Bussine's house in the rue Chabanais. Bussine was president, Ernest Reyer vice-president (replaced by Saint-Saëns shortly afterwards), Alexis de Castillon secretary and Jules Garcin assistant secretary. Founding members of the society included Théodore Dubois, Henri Duparc, Gabriel Fauré, César Franck, Ernest Guiraud, Jules Massenet, and Paul Taffanel. Their nationalist principles were explicit in the constitution, drafted by Castillon:

The proposed purpose of the Society is to aid the production and popularisation of all serious works, whether published or not, by French composers. To encourage and bring to light, as far as lies within its power, all musical attempts, whatever their form, on condition that they give evidence of lofty artistic aspirations on the part of their author. Fraternally, with entire forgetfulness of self, with the firm resolve to aid each other with all their capacity, the members will unite their efforts, each in his own sphere of action, to the study and performance of the works which they shall be called upon to select and interpret.

A biographer of Franck has written "They were determined to unite in their efforts to spread the gospel of French music and to make known the works of living French composers". Another clause in the constitution laid down, "No one can be part of the Society as an active member, unless he is French". (Note: Franck, born in what is now Belgium, was not in fact a French citizen at the time, although he mistakenly thought he was. He took French citizenship the following year.) The society adopted the Latin motto "Ars Gallica" – French Art.

The day after the inaugural meeting of the committee of the new society, an insurrection in Paris led to the establishment and subsequent bloody suppression of the Paris Commune, and musical matters were temporarily abandoned. (Note: The Communards did not entirely neglect music: they appointed the young Raoul Pugno to run the Opéra, but Saint-Saëns and Fauré were persona non grata, having served in the military under the French government to which the Communards were bitterly opposed. Both composers found it prudent to leave France briefly: Saint-Saëns for England and Fauré for Switzerland.) When peace was restored the society staged its first concert. It took place on 17 November 1871 at the Salle Pleyel in the rue de Richelieu, and featured the Trio in B♭ major by Franck, two songs by Dubois, Five Pieces in Ancient Style by Castillon, a reduction of the Violin Concerto by Garcin, an Improvisation for tenor by Massenet, and the Caprice héroïque for two pianos by Saint-Saëns, played by the composer and Fauré.

=== Development ===
The society leaned heavily towards chamber music and away from opera. Fauré later recalled:

The truth is that before 1870 I would never have dreamt of composing a sonata or a quartet. At that period there was no chance of a composer getting a hearing with works like that. I was given the incentive when Saint-Saëns founded the Société nationale de musique in 1871 with the primary aim of putting on works by young composers.

Early and later members: clockwise from top left, Gabriel Fauré, César Franck, Vincent d'Indy, Claude Debussy

Almost from the outset the society attracted about 150 members. Among those who joined after the founding members were Georges Bizet, Louis-Albert Bourgault-Ducoudray, Vincent d'Indy, Edouard Lalo, Charles Lenepveu and Charles-Marie Widor. The organisers would have liked to present their early concerts with an orchestra, but finances did not permit it, and they made do with pianos. In a study of the Parisian musical scene of the time, Elaine Brody writes that composers came to meetings prepared to offer their own compositions or to accompany singers who performed their mélodies, and that this set the society's concerts apart from routine concerts. In the early years, concerts were for members only, but in an attempt to increase the society's income and enable it to pay for orchestras, tickets were later made available to the general public.

In a survey of the society's work, Alain Cochart lists some of the well-known works premiered by or written for it in its first thirty years. Chabrier's Pièces pittoresques (1881) and Bourrée fantasque (1893); Franck's Piano Quintet (1880), Prélude, Choral and Fugue (1885), Variations symphoniques (1886) and String Quartet (1890); Fauré's Violin Sonata No. 1 (1877) and Piano Quartets Nos 1 and 2 (1880 and 1887); Cinq mélodies "de Venise" (1892) and La Bonne chanson (1895); Chausson's Symphony (1891); Dukas's L'Apprenti sorcier (1897); and Debussy's String Quartet (1893), Prélude à l'après-midi d'un faune (1894) and Pour le piano (1902).

=== Later years and legacy ===
In 1885 d'Indy was appointed joint secretary of the society. His ambition was to open up the society to non-French music and musicians. As a protégé of Franck he worked with his former teacher to establish a faction for change in the society. In 1886 he achieved his aims and Saint-Saëns and Bussine resigned. The first foreign composer whose work the society presented was Edvard Grieg. Franck refused the official title of president of the society, but when he died in 1890 d'Indy took the post. Under him, the new generation of French composers found the society increasingly conservative and less helpful to composers who did not follow the dogmatic compositional precepts taught by d'Indy at his music school, the Schola Cantorum de Paris.

In 1910 a group of young French composers led by Maurice Ravel rebelled, and set up a rival organisation, the Société musicale indépendante (SMI) (Note: French musical life in the late 19th- and early 20th centuries was shaped by numerous societies and movements. "The Association de Musique Contemporaine (AMC) served as a kind of umbrella organization which attempted to absorb some of the activities (and the audience) of the Société Nationale, Triton, the SMI, the SIMC, the concerts of La Revue musicale, La jeune France, Sérénade etc)." "La Sérénade", founded by Yvonne Giraud de Casa Fuerte, which catered to an elite audience with modern yet accessible (mostly vocal) music, gave its first concert on 1 December 1931. It was "a distinguished society which boasted Auric, Désormière, Markevich, Milhaud, Nabokoff, Poulenc and Sauguet among its active committee members, and a group of founders which constituted a veritable constellation of Parisian musical patrons: the Princesse Edmond de Polignac, the Vicomtesse de Noailles, Marie-Blanche de Polignac [ Jeanne Lanvin's daughter], Coco Chanel, Edward James and Comte Étienne de Beaumont". (Peter Hill and Nigel Simeone, Messiaen,Yale University Press, 1 janv. 2005 - 435 pages, p. 83). "La Spirale" was founded in 1935 by Georges Migot et Nestor Lejeune, the new director of the Schola Cantorum de Paris) to promote contemporary chamber music (Peter Hill et Nigel Simeone, Messiaen, 2005, 435 p., p. 61). Several of its members later formed La jeune France. The International Society for Contemporary Music (Paris) had its own review, the Revue musicale S.I.M. (Gallica: ). La Revue musicale, contributed to musical life with their "Auditions du mardi".)</ref>. They secured Fauré as their president, and for a while outshone the older body, attracting composers including Béla Bartók, Manuel de Falla, Arnold Schoenberg, Igor Stravinsky and Anton Webern. During the First World War strong attempts were made to bring the old and new societies together. D'Indy stood down as president of the Société nationale to allow his old friend Fauré to become president of both organisations in readiness for the merger, but the younger elements of the SMI were not reconciled with the old guard, and the proposal foundered. The two organisations continued to function separately until the SMI was wound up in 1935, after giving 171 concerts in its 25 years of existence. In the inter-war years the Société nationale presented new works by composers including Arthur Honegger, Francis Poulenc, Bohuslav Martinů and less well-known composers including Henri Lutz, Marcel Pollet, Marcel Labey and Déodat de Séverac. The society's existence came to an end in 1939, under its last president, Florent Schmitt.

In the early 20th century Romain Rolland wrote:

It is with respect that we must speak of the Société nationale, which was truly the cradle and sanctuary of French art. Everything that was great in French music, from 1870 to 1900, came through it. Without the Société nationale, most of the works that are the honour of our music not only would not have been performed, but perhaps would not even have been written. It had the rare merit of always being ten or fifteen years ahead of public opinion, which it formed, and which it compelled to honour those whom it was the first to recognise as great.

== Notes, references and sources ==
=== Sources ===
==== Books ====
- Brody, Elaine (1987). Paris: The Musical Kaleidoscope, 1870–1925. New York: Braziller. OCLC 1036782490.
- Fauré, Gabriel (1984). Jean-Michel Nectoux (ed.). Gabriel Fauré: His Life Through Letters. London: Boyars. ISBN 978-0-71-452768-0.
- Harding, James (1965). Saint-Saëns and his Circle. London: Chapman and Hall. OCLC 716864237.
- Hill, Edward Burlingame (1924). Modern French Music. Boston and New York: Houghton Mifflin. OCLC 1157132229.
- Kendall, Alan (1980). Music: Its Story in the West. London: Weidenfeld and Nicolson. OCLC 21514590.
- Nectoux, Jean-Michel (1991). Gabriel Fauré: A Musical Life. Cambridge: Cambridge University Press. ISBN 978-0-52-123524-2.
- Pistone, Danièle (2000). Musiques et musiciens à Paris dans les années trente. Paris: Champion. ISBN 978-2-74-530333-2.
- Reich, Willi (1971). Schoenberg: A Critical Biography. London: Longman. OCLC 894904931.
- Rolland, Romain (1908). Musiciens aujourd'hui. Paris: Hachette. OCLC 422344716.
- Schmidt, Carl B. (2001). Entrancing Muse: A Documented Biography of Francis Poulenc. Hillsdale, US: Pendragon Press. ISBN 978-1-57647-026-8.
- Stove, R. J. (2012). César Franck: His Life and Times. Lanham: Scarecrow Press. ISBN 9780810882072.
- Vallas, Léon (1951). César Franck. London: Harrap. OCLC 502610937.

==== Web ====
- Duchesneau, Michel (12 March 2020). "Société Nationale de musique" (PDF). Nouvelle Histoire de la Musique en France (1870–1950). pp. 1–7.
