= String Quartet (Franck) =

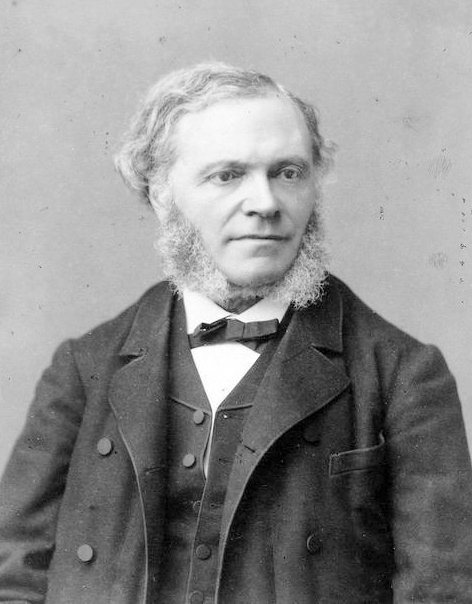
César Franck, photographed by Pierre Petit, 1887

The String Quartet in D major is the only string quartet composed by César Franck. The work was written from 1889 to 1890.

== Background ==
The creative life of Franck is broadly divided into three periods. During the first period (1841–1858), when his ambitious father forced him to be active as a virtuoso pianist, Franck wrote works for chamber music, including four piano trios numbered as the composer's Opp. 1 and 2. Franck received advice from Franz Liszt, who commented, about 40 years later, on hearing an organ performance by Franck at Sainte-Clotilde, Paris, "How could I ever forget the composer of those trios?" However, during the second period (1858–1876), when Franck dedicated himself to the organ, he did not compose any notable works for this genre. Franck’s masterpieces, including the Piano Quintet F minor (1879), the Violin Sonata A major (1886), and this quartet, were written in the third period (1876–1890). Since his next chamber work, the second violin sonata, was unfinished at the time of his death in 1890, this string quartet is his last completed chamber work.

Franck was influenced by Beethoven's late string quartets, but it was the work of his student Sylvio Lazzari that inspired him to his own contribution to the genre. Lazzari's expansive string quartet, composed in 1887-1888, impressed Franck when the young composer from Bolzano, who had settled in Paris, handed him the score. It startled him into 'a shock of recognition'. Franck started a sketch of his work at the beginning of 1889. (Note: According to another reference, it was 29 October 1889.) He commenced with the first movement, and, through at least three different versions, completed the final version of it on October 29. After quickly finishing the second movement by November 9, he completed the entire work on January 15, 1890. Vincent d'Indy, one of Franck's celebrated pupils, noted (in the detailed analysis he includes in his biography of the master) that Franck had already considered writing a string quartet as early as the 1870s. (Note: Two references insists different years; one for the beginning of 1870, the other for around 1878.) It was in the 1870s that the Société nationale de musique, which Franck joined as one of the founding members, was established in order to promote the French classical music tradition instead of stage music; it dominated the country's music scene at that time under influential musicians including Jacques Offenbach. Although Franck abandoned his string quartet, he resumed in 1888 when, as d'Indy recalled, he found scores of string quartets by Beethoven, Schubert and 'even' Brahms on his piano for intensive study. (Note: The same story is also dated to around 1878 in another reference.) Many elements of Franck's string quartet are considered to stem from Beethoven's later works, but traces of Beethoven are not superficially visible.

The String Quartet was Franck’s first public success during his life. Franck, known as a late-flowering composer, had attracted little attention from audiences. Even the Symphony in D minor and the Prélude, Aria et Final, whose reputation is well established today, were disastrously premiered. However, he never pandered to the French public taste of the day and never ceased pursuing his ideal of music, gradually attracting interest from the public as well as professionals through masterpieces such as his violin sonata. Finally, on 19 April 1890, in the concert of the Société nationale de musique at Salle Pleyel, the premiere of this work was received with thunderous applause. This was just seven months before his death.

The score of this work was published in 1892, and the edition by Hamelle, Paris, was widely used in 1906.

== Structure ==
Franck's quartet is a major work, symphonic in scale, consisting of four movements which are tightly united by cyclic form. A complete performance lasts approximately 50 minutes, making it one of the longer string quartets in the repertory.

1. Poco lento (D major) – Allegro (D minor) in 4/4
2. Scherzo: Vivace (F♯ minor) in 3/8
3. Larghetto (B major) in 3/4
4. Finale: Allegro molto (D major) in 2/2

=== I. Poco lento – Allegro ===
This movement, written in unusual sonata form combined with ternary form, begins with a large introduction, which d'Indy calls the Lied (song) and also L'idée mère (fundamental or generative idea). The first violin plays the main theme of the introduction over the harmonic accompaniment of strings (Excerpt 1). This subject will appear in this and later movements as the first cyclic theme. The introduction comprises Excerpt 1 and Excerpt 2, which is played quietly in contrast.

A stepwise-falling dotted rhythm, suggested at the very end of the introduction, leads into the main part of sonata form in D minor starting with exposition of first subject (Excerpt 3). Excerpt 4, played by cello during an energetic transition, will play an important role in the finale as the second cyclic theme. Excerpt 4 is also played by violin. The passionate climax is smoothly connected to the exposition of the second subject, in F major, which appeared in dialogue between the first violin and viola (Excerpt 5).

The next climax calms down with a codetta using Excerpt 3, which closes the exposition. In the development section, Poco Lento, the viola starts a fugue based on Excerpt 1, followed by second violin, cello, and then first violin. A conventional development of the first subject (Excerpt 3), again Allegro, comes after the emotional end of the fugue. The development also includes Excerpts 4, 5 and many other materials. The reappearance of the first subject in D minor proclaims the opening of the recapitulation, (Note: A reference says that recapitulation begins with the first subject in "G minor", presumably mistaking development part as recapitulation.) followed by Excerpt 4. The second subject begins in B major, but, just four bars later, modulates into D major, which leads to the reappearance of the introductory Lied (Poco lento), in the same tonality. Echoes of Excerpt 3, following Excerpt 1 and 2, conclude the movement.

Excerpt 1 (violin)

Excerpt 2 (violin)

Excerpt 3 (violin)

Excerpt 4 (cello)

Excerpt 5 (violin)

=== II. Scherzo: Vivace ===
The second movement is coloured by Mendelssohnian lightness. Impressive ascending repeated notes, as shown in Excerpt 6, open the movement’s F-sharp minor scherzo. Effective frequent tacet insertions are observed here. Another main subject, Excerpt 7, is played by first violin in contrasting fluent manner. The D minor trio, based on Excerpt 8, is also interrupted by whole rests elongated with fermata. In the middle of the trio, the cello covertly plays Excerpt 1. Afterwards, the Scherzo returns (Excerpt 6), now with pizzicato bars plugging the original silent bars, and is soon bridged to Excerpt 7. The movement ends with a quiet pizzicato coda featuring Excerpt 8. This is the shortest and most immediately accessible of the quartet's movements: imitated for example by Frank Bridge in the second of his three Novelletten just a few years later (1904).

Excerpt 6

Excerpt 7 (violin)

Excerpt 8 (violin)

=== III. Larghetto ===
The structure of the third movement is close to ternary form. The lyrical opening theme, Excerpt 9, is supposed to have originated from Excerpts 1 and 4.

The first part of this movement is in ternary form itself, and Excerpt 9 reappears after the exposition of Excerpt 10. In the second part of this movement, a passionate melody is exhibited by the first violin over the accompaniment of extended arpeggios (Excerpt 11). That melody has already appeared in the middle voice during the exposition of Excerpt 10. Repeated modulation prevents an obvious determination of tonality, though the key signature is C major. After the climax of the middle part, Excerpt 9 is recapitulated in ppp. This third part is not a simple reemerging of the first part; it is rather shortened and it includes elements of the second part in Poco Animato. Finally, Excerpt 10 quietly closes the movement.

Excerpt 9 (violin)

Excerpt 10 (violin) (Note: The score from Hamelle shows cis note at third bar, third beat, despite c note shown by Hirano and heard in record.)

Excerpt 11 (violin)

=== IV. Finale: Allegro molto ===
The finale is in extended sonata form. It begins with a strong declamatory unison phrase (Excerpt 12), whose argument continues like a 'window frame' between the panes of the main subjects from the previous three movements: Excerpt 9 from the third movement, Excerpt 6 from the second movement, and Excerpt 1 from the first movement. This 'summary' is similar to the finale from Beethoven's ninth symphony; Franck himself had used the same method in his organ piece Grande Pièce Symphonique. Since the three main subjects contrast strongly (in different ways) with their frame, one might also think of the second movement of Beethoven's 4th piano concerto with its dialogue between 'angry' orchestra and 'pacifying' piano, which had previously inspired the opening of Franck's Symphonic Variations for piano and orchestra.

After the introduction, the main subjects are exposed. The first subject (Excerpt 13), exposed on viola, is induced from Excerpt 1. Following a brief conclusion with a fragment of Excerpt 12, a series of second subjects appear: Excerpt 14, which is a transformation of Excerpt 4; Excerpt 15, played with rigorous accompaniment of Excerpt 12; and the encouraging Excerpt 16.

In the development, Franck combines the major subjects in counterpoint. Excerpt 1 is added and Excerpt 12 repeatedly appears to change the atmosphere. Although the beginning of the recapitulation is not clear, the second reappearance of the first subject, at approximately bar 500, is followed by the second subjects. At the end of the recapitulation, Excerpt 6 suddenly emerges from silence. This marks the advent of the coda, where Excerpt 6 dominates in counterpoint with Excerpt 13. At the final climax, Excerpt 9 is sung dramatically in augmentation. Contained emotion after the climax turns into Excerpt 12, in Presto, which rushes into the conclusion.

Excerpt 12

Excerpt 13 (viola)

Excerpt 14 (violin)

Excerpt 15 (violin)

Excerpt 16 (violin)

== Notes and references ==
Notes

=== Sources ===
- Hirano, Akira (1980). 最新名曲解説全集 第12巻 室内楽曲II [The Complete Collection of Latest Famous Songs, Volume 12, Chamber Music II]. 音楽之友社 [Ongaku no Tomosha].
- Oki, Masaoki (1980). 最新名曲解説全集 第12巻 室内楽曲II [The Complete Collection of Latest Famous Songs, Volume 12, Chamber Music II]. 音楽之友社 [Ongaku no Tomosha].
- Yashiro, Akio (1981). 最新名曲解説全集 第16巻 独奏曲III [The Complete Collection of Latest Famous Songs, Volume 16 Solo Part III]. 音楽之友社 [Ongaku no Tomosha].
- d'Indy, Vincent (1910). César Franck. Travis & Emery Music Bookshop. ISBN 978-1-906857-78-3
