= Symphony in B-flat (Chausson) =

Musical work composed by Ernest Chausson

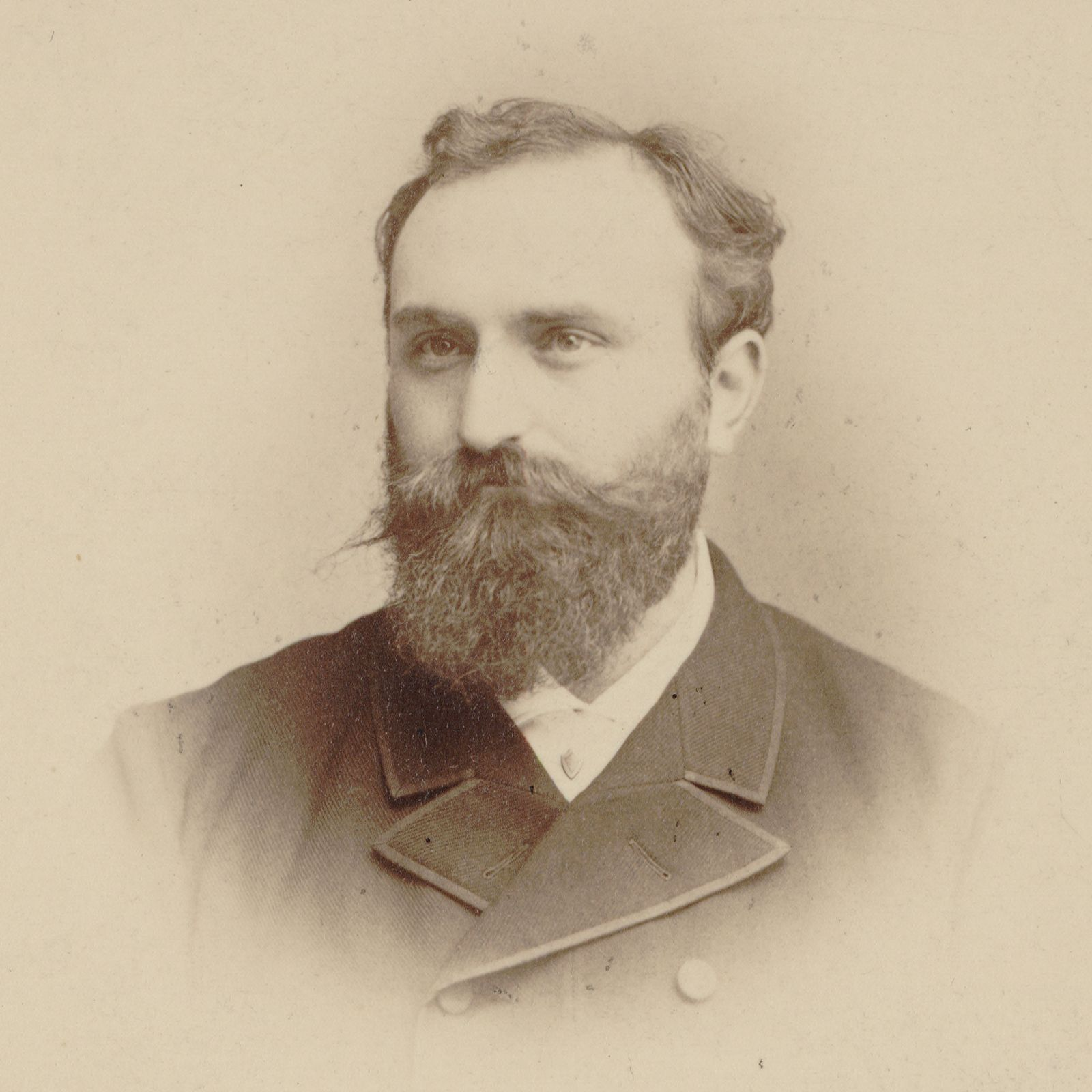
Ernest Chausson, cabinet card photo by P. Frois, Biarritz, ca. 1885

Ernest Chausson's Symphony in B♭ major, Op. 20, his only symphony, was written in 1890 and is often considered his masterpiece. It was first performed on 18 April 1891 at a concert of the Société Nationale de Musique conducted by the composer. As with César Franck's Symphony in D minor, the critics were divided. It is dedicated to the French painter and art collector Henry Lerolle.

== Music ==
The score calls for 2 flutes, piccolo, 2 oboes, cor anglais, 2 clarinets in B♭, bass clarinet, 3 bassoons, 4 horns in F, 4 trumpets, 3 trombones, tuba, 3 timpani, 2 harps and strings.

The symphony follows the three-movement form as established by Chausson's teacher and mentor César Franck, it also employs the cyclic form of recurring themes.

1. Lent-Allegro vivo
2. Très Lent
3. Animé

The first movement follows a personal adaptation of sonata-form, dividing the development section into several sections, with a highly dramatic slow introduction, introducing the solemn main theme of the symphony. It slowly builds to an anguished climax only to be followed by a very swift and light-hearted allegro vivo in the key of B♭ major. The second subject is more relaxed and harmonised in chromatic-impressionistic chords. After a sudden heightening tension the Allegro Vivo theme is restated and the movement closes triumphantly.

The second movement is an A-B-A' structure and brings in mind Chausson's songs. It begins darkly in the key of D minor. The second subject, in B flat, is more optimistic. This builds up in a double climax, the second being a rather bold restatement of the first subject. The movement ends in D major. The third movement is a rondo structure supplemented by an epilogue, not unlike the finale in Franck's Symphony in D minor. The beginning is rather tempestuous, expressed in swift 16th figures alternating inexorably between strings and woodwind. The second theme is a brass chorale, reminiscent of Franck. The conclusion of the symphony is undoubtedly the most moving of all with the theme of the first movement stealing in and fading away in the end.

The Symphony takes Franck's concept of three-movement pattern with cyclic form one step further, making the form more dramatic and compressing symphonic form, a task taken to its extremes by Jean Sibelius. Harmonically it takes Franck's chromaticism towards something more impressionistic.

Another curious parallel with the Franck Symphony is the key relationships between the movements.

Franck. Symphony in D minor, Op. 48 (1886–1888)

1. Lento - Allegro non troppo. D minor (ending in D major)
2. Allegretto. B♭ minor (ending in B♭ major)
3. Allegro non troppo. D major

Chausson. Symphony in B♭ major, Op. 20 (1890)

1. Lent - Allegro Vivo. B♭ major
2. Très Lent. D minor (ending in D major)
3. Animé. B♭ minor (ending in B♭ major)
