= Grande Pièce Symphonique =

Grande Pièce Symphonique, Op.17, FWV 29, is an organ work by French composer and organist César Franck. Written in 1860–62, it is the second and, at an average duration of 25 minutes, the largest piece from Six Pièces pour Grand Orgue. It is dedicated to the composer Charles-Valentin Alkan.

== Background ==
The Six Pièces are an important work of the composer, marking the beginning of the second period of his career and predicting the flowering in his later creative life. His long struggle on the comic opera Le Valet de ferme (1851–1853) ended with a disastrous failure of the production and a disappointment, which paralysed Franck's activity as a composer for several years. The influence of the new Cavaillé-Coll organ at Sainte-Clotilde, Paris, for which he was appointed first organist in 1859, encouraged him to resume composing. Japanese composer Akio Yashiro found out that, in comparison to the C major Fantaisie Op.16 (Six Pièces, No. 1), Franck now makes extensive use of all possibilities of the organ. (Note: Although Yashiro wrote the name of church as Church of Saint-Sulpice inconsistently, this is assumed to be Saint-Clotilde from the view of Franck's history as an organist.)

Grande pièce symphonique is written in a single movement, which may be divided into three parts, the second of them being the Andante with a scherzo-like middle section. This feature of the work, sometimes referred to as "organ symphony", has induced comparison with his later chef-d’œuvre, the Symphony in D minor. Yashiro regarded this work as prototype of the symphony, based on the following four reasons:

1. Unity of the cyclic form, “thème cyclique”
2. Similarity of the cyclic themes in both works
3. Scherzo is embedded in the slow movement
4. Conclusion with "joy of faith" in parallel major.

In addition, Yashiro pointed out that this work shares several features with some of composer's later masterpieces.

The work's dedicatee, the virtuoso pianist and composer Charles Valentin Alkan, had written a symphony for solo piano a few years earlier, as part of the Douze Études dans tous les tons mineurs, Op. 39, published in 1857, which also included the celebrated concerto for solo piano. Franck highly praised Alkan and arranged some of his piano pieces for organ. (Note: e.g. "Prelude and Payer", 1889.) The score was published as part of the “Six pièces pour Grand-Orgue” by Mme. Maeyen-Couvreur, Paris. Around 1878, there was a reissue by Durand.

== Structure ==
Although the work is written as a single movement, it can be divided into three parts.

=== First part ===
Andantino serioso, 4/4, F♯ minor

The work starts with an introduction, presenting the thematic material, which will determine the piece.

Excerpt 1

Excerpt 2

Excerpt 3

Excerpt 1 is played two times on Grand Orgue, and is answered by excerpt 2 on Récit. Excerpt 1 then appears on pedal and Grand Orgue, accompanied by excerpt 3. After a brief climax in the introduction, the first subject of the sonata form appears (excerpt 4), which ties the whole work as a cyclic theme. Yashiro pointed out the similarity between this theme and that of Franck's symphony in D minor.

Excerpt 4

A chorale-like second subject is introduced in A major after contrapuntal expansion of the first subject, as in traditional sonata form. A recapitulation of excerpt 2 follows and the concluding triplet is extended, forming a streaming accompaniment to excerpt 4, this time played in the Positif. Finally, the recapitulation begins with the first subject in the pedals, followed by the second subject in F♯ minor. Excerpt 2 then reemerges and ends with a profound, lingering echo (molto lento, fermata).

=== Second part ===
Andante, 4/4, B major

The movement starts with a graceful melody (excerpt 5) deduced from excerpt 3, frequently switching between Positif and Récit.

Excerpt 5 (Note: In the second bar of middle stave, the note b is tied to following note.)

The conclusion of the melody of excerpt 5 is interrupted by a scherzo (Allegro, 2/4, B minor). It is filled with rapid semiquavers derived from the cyclic theme (excerpt 4). The end of the scherzo part, which in itself comprises a ternary form, leads into a shortened recapitulation of excerpt 5 in B major.

=== Third part ===
"Beaucoup plus largement que précédemment", 4/4, F♯ major

The third movement begins with a recapitulation of themes from the previous parts, in a similar way as Beethoven did in the finale of his ninth symphony. As with Beethoven, a recitativo from the basses (i.e. the pedals), formed from motifs of excerpt 4, links the reappearances of the theme from the introduction (excerpt 1 in G minor), the scherzo theme in B♭ major and the Andante theme in C major). A long crescendo then prepares the triumphant entrance of the first part main theme in F♯ major, accompanied by a virtuoso pedal part in quavers:

Excerpt 6

The piece is concluded by a fugue, again based on the beginning of the main theme (excerpt 4), and a lengthy and joyful coda.

== Notes and references ==
Notes

== Sources ==
- Yashiro, Akio (1981). 最新名曲解説全集 第16巻 独奏曲III. 音楽之友社.
- Score Franck Grande pièce symphonique, Maeyens-Couvreur, Paris
