= César Franck =

Belgian-French composer and organist (1822–1890)

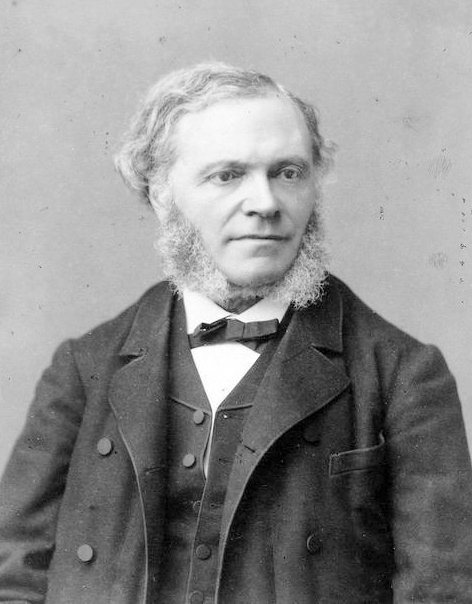
- Franck, photographed by Pierre Petit, 1887
- Born: 10 December 1822; Liège, United Kingdom of the Netherlands
- Died: 8 November 1890 (aged 67); Paris, France
- Occupations: Composer; Organist; Pianist; Academic teacher
- Organizations: Basilica of St. Clotilde, Paris; Conservatoire de Paris
- Works: List of compositions

César Auguste Jean Guillaume Hubert Franck (French: [sezaʁ oɡyst ʒɑ̃ ɡijom ybɛʁ fʁɑ̃k]; 10 December 1822 – 8 November 1890) was a French Romantic composer, pianist, organist, and music teacher born in present-day Belgium.

He was born in Liège (which at the time of his birth was part of the United Kingdom of the Netherlands). He gave his first concerts there in 1834 and studied privately in Paris from 1835, where his teachers included Anton Reicha. After a brief return to Belgium, and a disastrous reception of an early oratorio Ruth, he moved to Paris, where he married and embarked on a career as teacher and organist. He gained a reputation as a formidable musical improviser, and travelled widely within France to demonstrate new instruments built by Aristide Cavaillé-Coll.

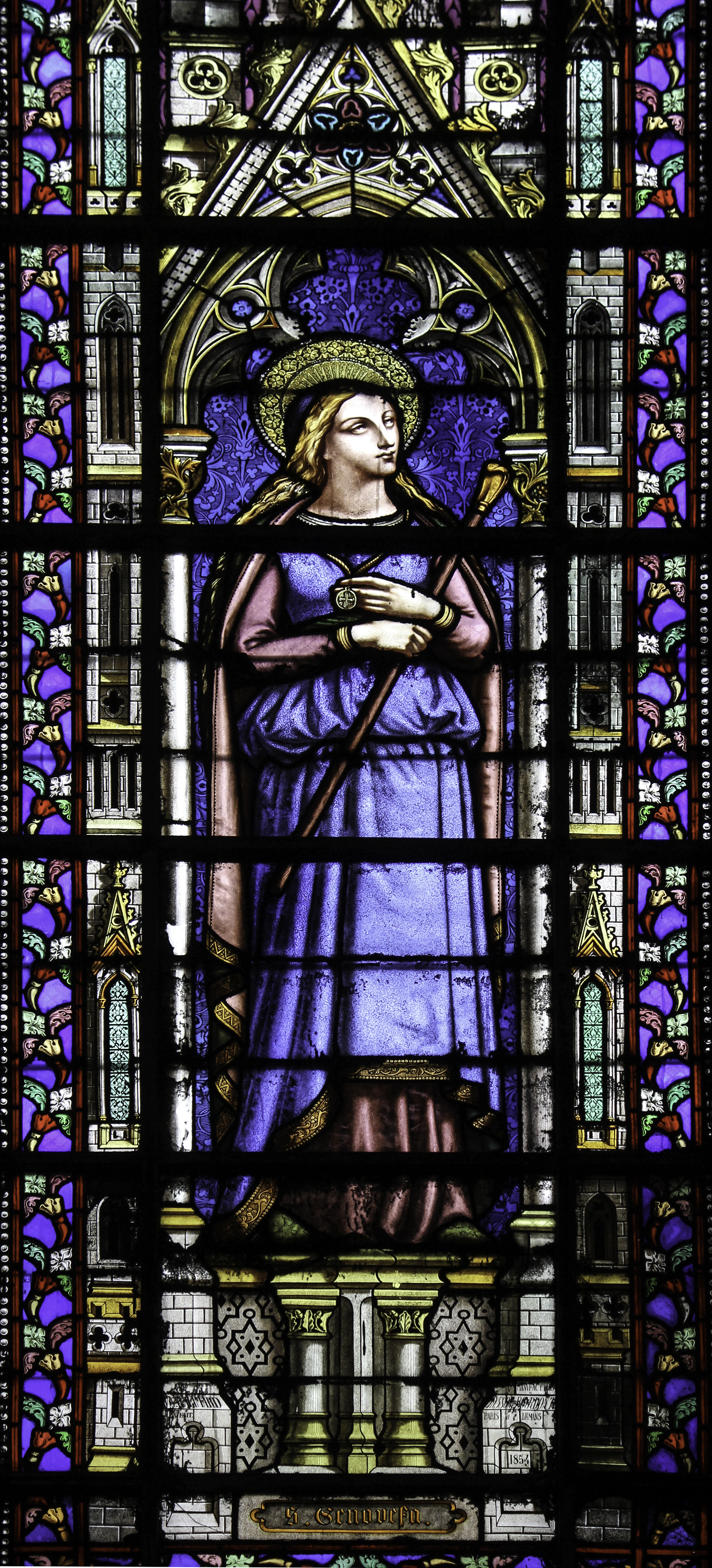
Stained glass located in Basilica of St. Clotilde, Paris

In 1859, he became titular organist at the church Sainte-Clotilde, a position he retained for the rest of his life. He became professor at the Paris Conservatoire in 1872; he took French nationality, a requirement of the appointment. After acquiring the professorship, Franck wrote several pieces that have entered the standard classical repertoire, including symphonic, chamber, and keyboard works for pipe organ and piano. As a teacher and composer he had a vast following of composers and other musicians. His pupils included Ernest Chausson, Vincent d'Indy, Henri Duparc, Guillaume Lekeu, Albert Renaud, Charles Tournemire, Gabriel Pierné and Louis Vierne.

His best known works include the Symphony in D minor, the Violin Sonata and a setting of the Panis angelicus.

== Biography ==
=== Child and student (1822–1842) ===
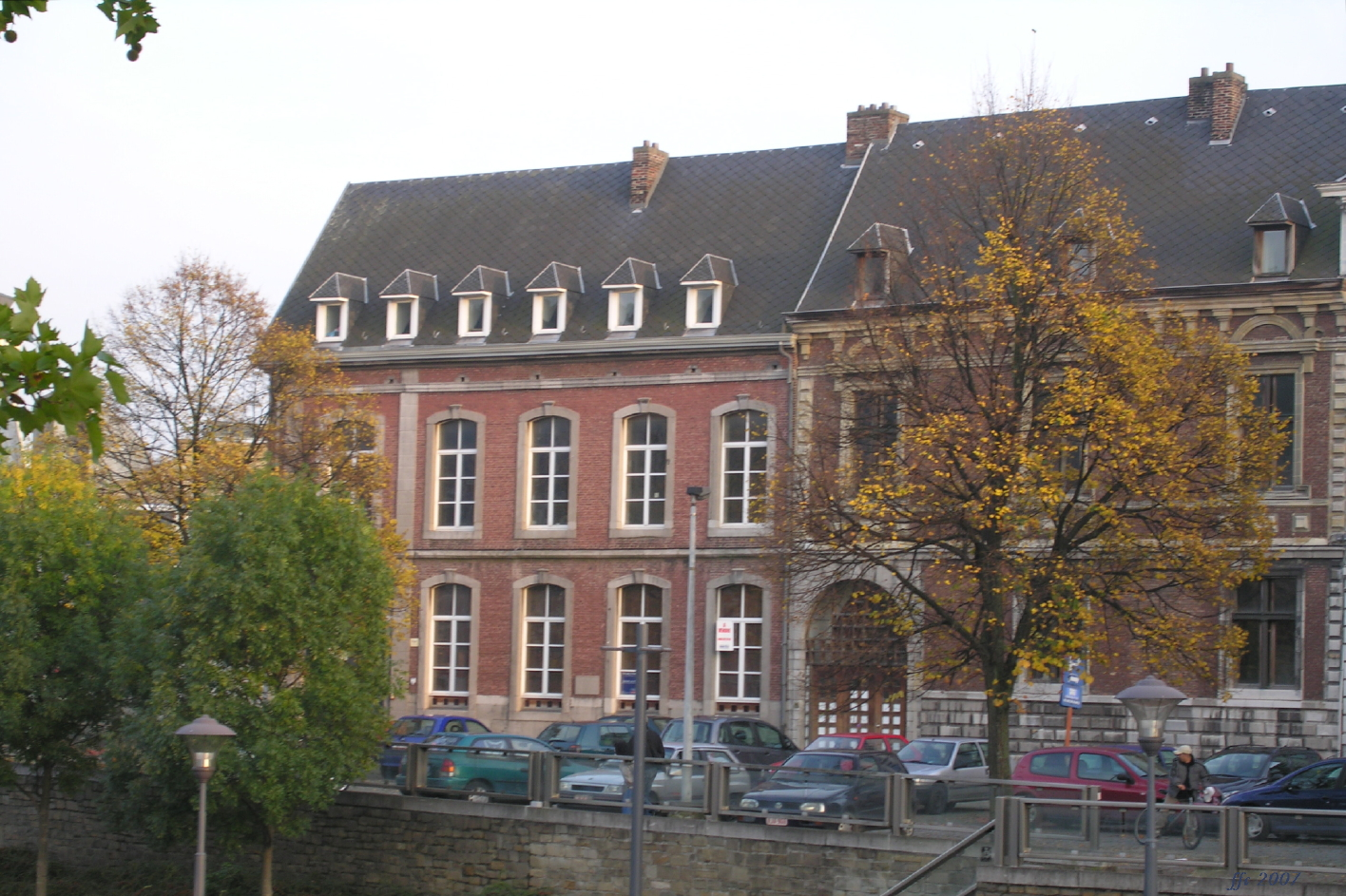
House Grady in Liège, where Franck was born

Franck was born in Liège, then part of the United Kingdom of the Netherlands, to Nicolas-Joseph Franck (1794–1871), a bank clerk whose family came from the then German-Dutch border, and Marie-Catherine-Barbe Franck (née Frings, 1788–1860), who was from Aachen, Germany. Although young César-Auguste, as he was known in his early years, showed both drawing and musical skills, his father envisioned him as a young prodigy pianist-composer, after the manner of Franz Liszt or Sigismond Thalberg, who would bring fame and fortune to his family. His father entered Franck at the Royal Conservatory of Liège, studying solfège, piano, organ, and harmony with Joseph Daussoigne-Méhul and other faculty members. César-Auguste gave his first concerts in 1834, one before Leopold I of the newly formed Kingdom of Belgium.

In 1835, his father resolved that the time had come for wider audiences, and brought César-Auguste and his younger brother Joseph to Paris, to study privately: harmony and counterpoint with Anton Reicha, piano with Pierre Zimmerman, and solfège with Hippolyte-Raymond Colet. When Reicha died some ten months later, Nicolas-Joseph sought to enter both boys into the Paris Conservatoire. However, the Conservatoire would not accept foreigners; Nicolas-Joseph was obliged to seek French citizenship, which was granted in 1837. In the interval, Nicolas-Joseph promoted concerts and recitals in Paris featuring one or both boys playing popular music of the period, to mostly good reviews.

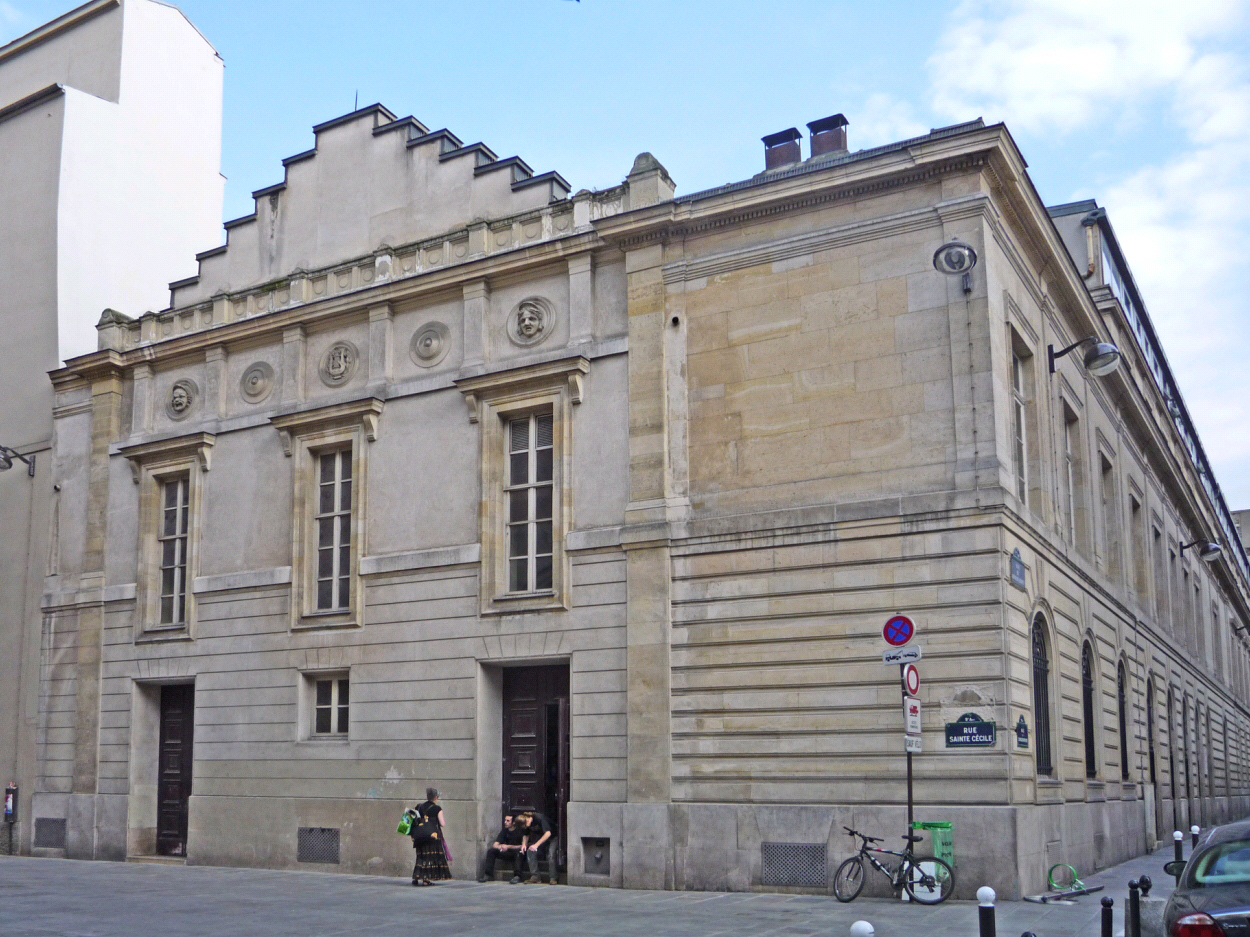
School building of Paris Conservatoire, used until 1911

Young Franck and his brother entered the Conservatoire in October 1837, César-Auguste continuing his piano studies under Zimmerman and beginning composition with Aimé Leborn. He took the first prize in piano at the end of his first year (1838) and consistently maintained that level of performance. His work in counterpoint was less spectacular, taking successively third, second, and first prizes between 1838 and 1840. He added organ studies with François Benoist, which included both performance and improvisation, taking second prize in 1841, with the aim of competing for the Prix de Rome in composition in the following year. However, for reasons that are not explicit, he made a "voluntary" retirement from the Conservatoire on 22 April 1842.

His withdrawal may have been at his father's behest. While César-Auguste was pursuing his academic studies, he was, at his father's demand, also teaching privately and giving concerts. "It was a hard life for him, . . . and not made easier by the ill-tempered and even vindictive behavior of his father . . . ." Concerts performed by young Franck (some with his brother on the violin, some including Franck's own compositions) were at first received well, but increasingly Nicolas-Joseph's commercial promotion of his sons antagonized the Parisian musical journals and critics. César-Auguste's technical abilities as a pianist were acknowledged; his abilities as a composer were (probably justly at this point) felt to be wanting. The whole situation was aggravated by what in the end became a feud between Nicolas-Joseph and Henri Blanchard, the principal critic of the Revue et Gazette musicale, who lost no opportunity to castigate the aggressive pretensions of the father and to mock the "imperial" names of the elder son. This animosity, "undoubtedly personal", may well have caused Nicolas-Joseph to decide that a return to Belgium was in order, and in 1842 "a peremptory order" to young Franck compelled the latter to leave the Conservatoire and accompany him.

=== Teacher and organist (1842–1858) ===
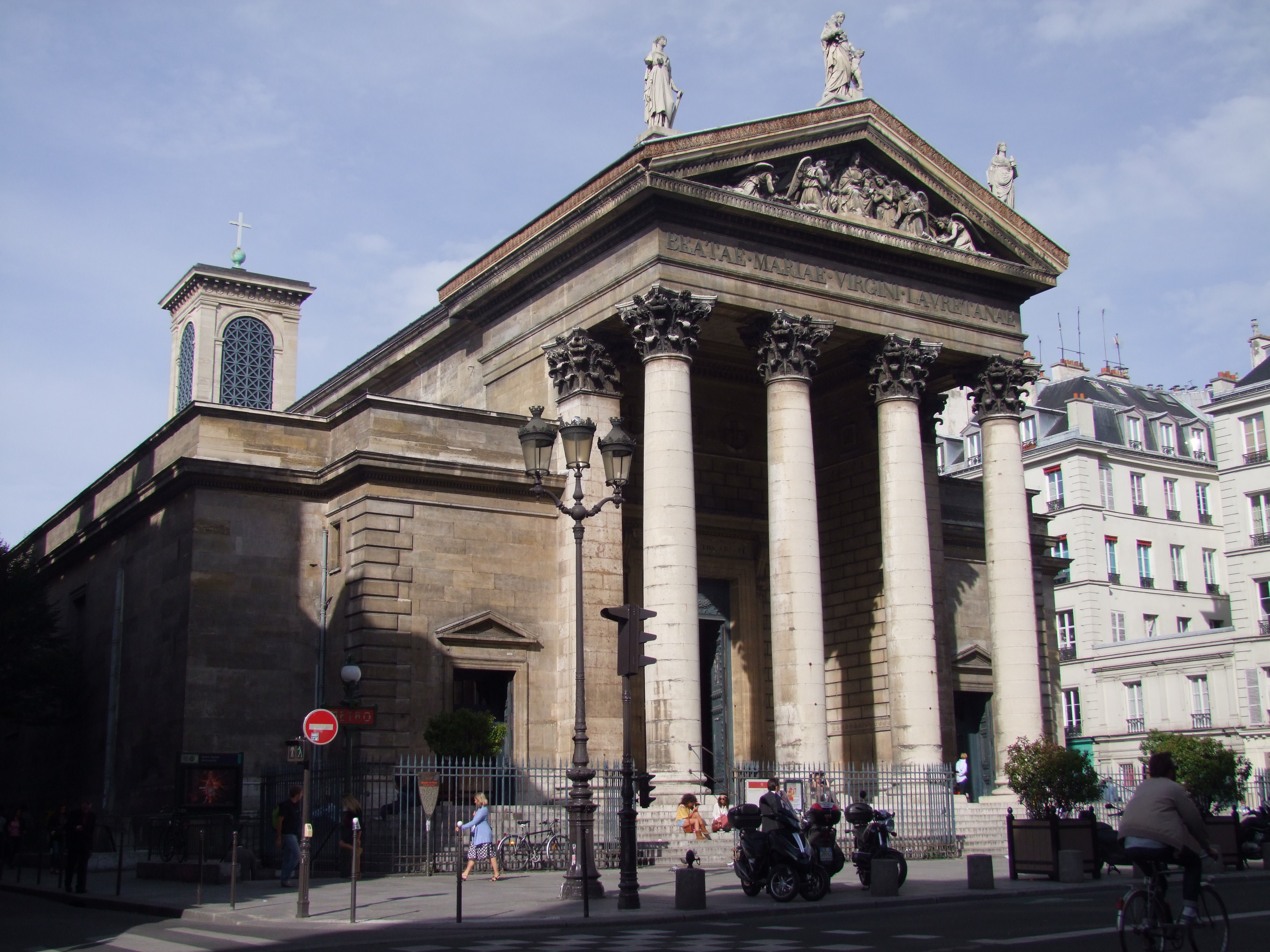
Notre-Dame-de-Lorette, Paris

The return to Belgium lasted less than two years. Profitable concerts did not arise; the critics were indifferent or scornful; patronage from the Belgian court was not forthcoming (although the King later sent César-Auguste a gold medal) and there was no money to be made. As far as Nicolas-Joseph was concerned, the excursion was a failure, and he brought his son back into a regime of teaching and family concerts in Paris, which Laurence Davies characterizes as rigorous and low-paying. Yet there were long-term benefits for young Franck. For it was from this period, extending back into his last Conservatoire years and forward beyond his return to Paris, that his first mature compositions emerged, a set of Trios (piano, violin, cello); these are the first of what he regarded as his permanent work. Liszt saw them, offered encouragement and constructive criticism, and performed them some years later in Weimar. In 1843, Franck began work on his first non-chamber work, the oratorio Ruth. It was privately premiered in 1845 before Liszt, Meyerbeer, and other musical notables, who gave moderate approval and constructive criticism. However, a public performance in early 1846 met with public indifference and critical snubs for the oratorio's artlessness and simplicity. The work was not performed again until 1872, after considerable revision.

In reaction, César-Auguste essentially retired from public life to one of obscurity as a teacher and accompanist, in which his father reluctantly concurred. Young Franck had commissions both in Paris and in Orléans for these activities, and for the composition of songs and small works. He had offered some compositions to celebrate and strengthen the new Second Republic of 1848; the public received some of them with interest, but as the Republic gave way to the Second Empire under Louis-Napoléon, they dropped out of use. In 1851, he attempted an opera, Le Valet de Ferme, with a libretto of "abysmal literary quality" and a hastily sketched score. Franck himself was to say towards the end of his career that "it is not worth printing." All in all, however, this obscurity may have been restful for him after his previous life in the spotlight: "Franck was still very much in the dark as to what his vocation was." However, two crucial changes in these years were to shape the remainder of his life.

The first was an almost complete disruption of relations with his parents, especially his father. The main cause was his friendship with, and later, love for one of his private piano pupils, Eugénie-Félicité-Caroline Saillot (1824–1918), whose parents were members of the Comédie-Française company under the stage name of Desmousseaux. He had known Felicité from his years at the Conservatoire, and her family home had become something of a refuge for him from his overbearing father. When, in 1846, Nicolas-Joseph found a composition dedicated to "Mlle. F. Desmousseaux, in pleasant memories" among César-Auguste's papers, he tore it up in the latter's presence. César-Auguste went directly to the Desmousseauxs', wrote out the piece from memory, and presented it to Félicité with a dedicatory line. Relations worsened with his father, who forbade any thought of betrothal and marriage (French law required parental consent to marriage for a son younger than 25), accused César-Auguste of distressing his mother and shouted at him about a then notorious husband-wife poisoning case as being the most likely outcome of any match by his son. His mother's role in the dispute is unclear: she was either mildly supportive of her son or stayed out of the conflict. On one Sunday in July, César-Auguste walked out of his parents' house for the last time with nothing except what he could carry, and moved to the Desmousseauxs', where he was welcomed. From that time on, Franck termed himself and signed his papers and works as César Franck or plain C. Franck. "It was his intention to make a clean break with his father and to let it be known he had done so . . . . He was determined to become a new person, as different as possible from the other."

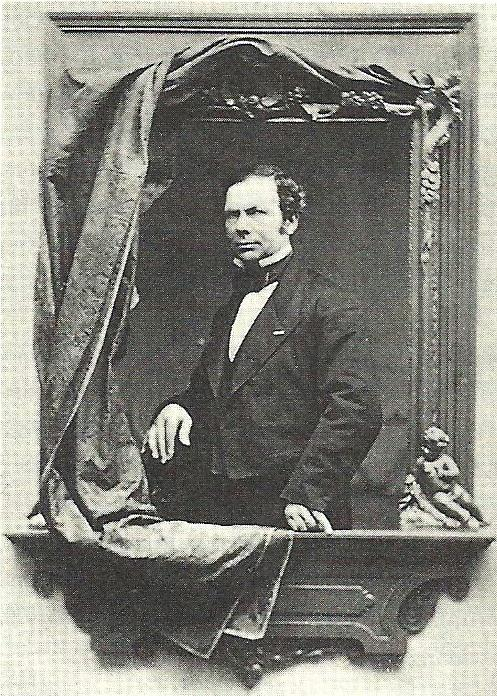
Aristide Cavaillé-Coll, ca. 1855

Under Félicité's parents' friendly if vigilant eyes, he continued to court her. As soon as he turned 25 in 1847, he informed his father of his intention to marry Felicité, and did so on 22 February 1848, the month of the Paris revolt. To get to the church, the party had to climb over the barricades set up by the revolutionaries – with, d'Indy says, "the willing help of the insurgents who were massed behind this improvised fortification." The elder Francks were sufficiently reconciled to the marriage to attend the ceremony; they signed the register at what had become César's parish church, Notre-Dame-de-Lorette.

It was the second great change that had made Notre-Dame-de-Lorette become Franck's parish church: his appointment there as assistant organist in 1847, the first of a succession of increasingly more important and influential organ posts. Although Franck had never shone at the Conservatoire as organist in the same manner that he had as pianist, he had wanted an organist's position, not least because it provided a steady income. He now had occasion to match his Roman Catholic devotion with learning the skills needed for accompanying public worship, as well as the occasional opportunity to fill in for his superior, Alphonse Gilbat. In this position he won the favorable attention of the church's Abbé Dancel, who in 1851 moved to the new church of Saint-Jean-Saint-François-au-Marais (a small church in Le Marais district), as curé and two years later invited Franck to assume the position of titulaire, or primary organist. Franck's new church possessed a fine new organ (1846) by Aristide Cavaillé-Coll, who had been making a name for himself as an artistically gifted and mechanically innovative creator of magnificent new instruments. "My new organ," Franck said, "it's like an orchestra!" Franck's improvisatory skills were now in much demand, since liturgical practice of the time required the ability to take the plainsong music sung for the Mass or the Office and to develop from it organ music fitting into the service between texts sung or spoken by the choir or clergy. Furthermore, Franck's playing ability and his love of the Cavaillé-Coll instruments led to his collaboration with the builder to demonstrate the latter's instruments, Franck travelling to towns throughout France to show off older instruments or play inaugural concerts on new ones.

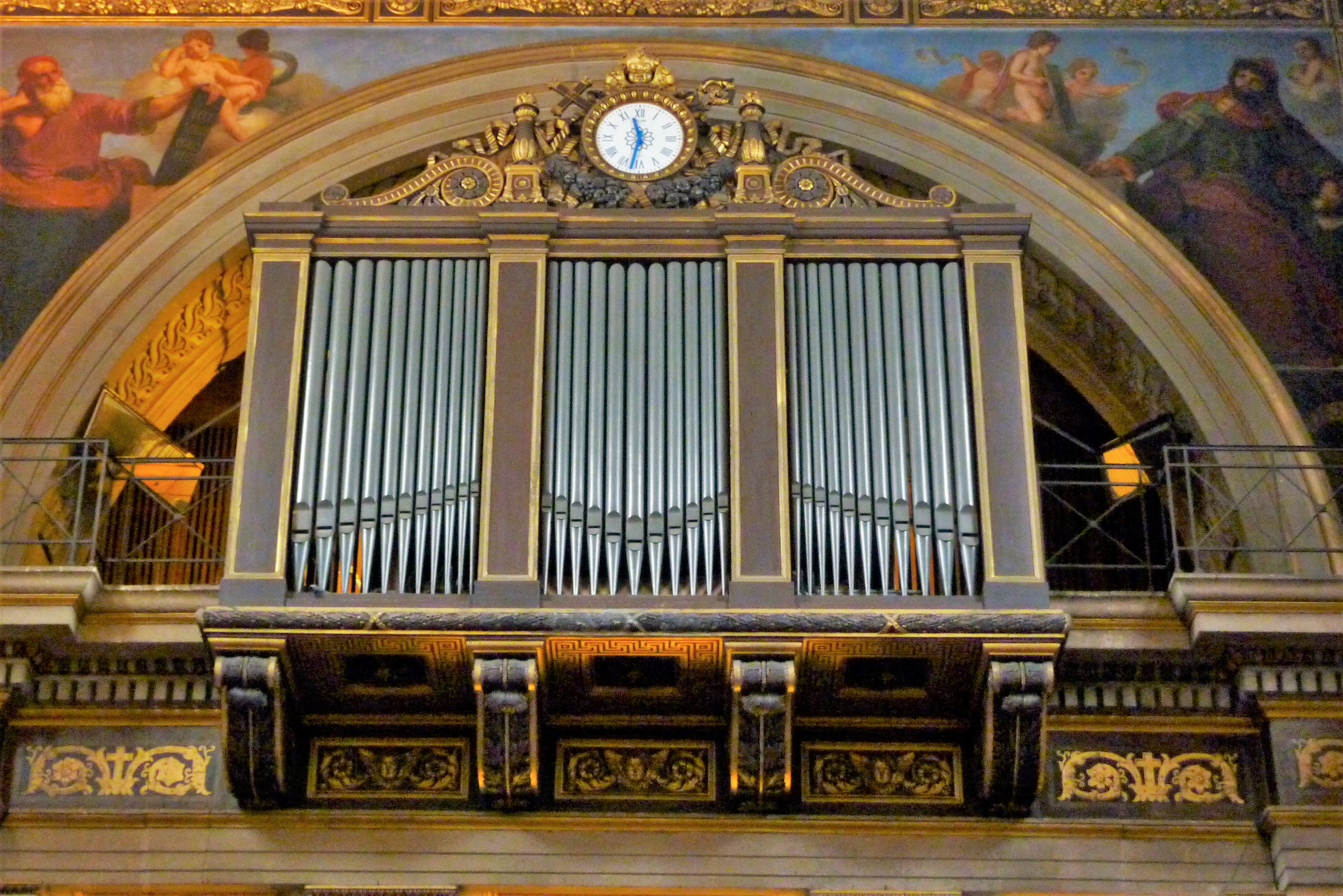
Organ of Notre-Dame-de-Lorette

At the same time, a revolutionary change was occurring in the techniques of French organ performance. The German organist Adolf Hesse (1809–1863), a student of Bach's biographer Johann Nikolaus Forkel, had demonstrated in 1844 in Paris the pedal technique which (together with a German-style pedal board) made the performance of Bach's works possible. This was totally outside the scope of the kind of playing which Franck had learned from Benoist at the Conservatoire; most French organs did not have the pedal board notes required for such work, and even France's own great classical organ tradition dating from the period of the Couperins was at that time neglected in favour of the art of improvisation. Hesse's performances might have been treated simply as a short sensation for their dazzling virtuosity, but that Hesse's pupil Jacques-Nicolas Lemmens (1823–1881) came to Paris in 1852 and again in 1854. Lemmens was then professor of organ at the Royal Conservatory of Brussels, and was not only a virtuoso performer of Bach but a developer of organ teaching methods with which all organists could learn to play with precision, clarity, and legato phrasing. Franck appeared on the same inaugural concert program as Lemmens in 1854, much admiring not only the classic interpretation of Bach but also the rapidity and evenness of Lemmens's pedal work. Léon Vallas states that Franck, pianist before he was organist, "never wholly acquired the legato style himself"; nevertheless he realized the expansion of organ style made possible by the introduction of such techniques and set about the task of mastering them.

=== Titulaire at Sainte-Clotilde (1859–1890) ===
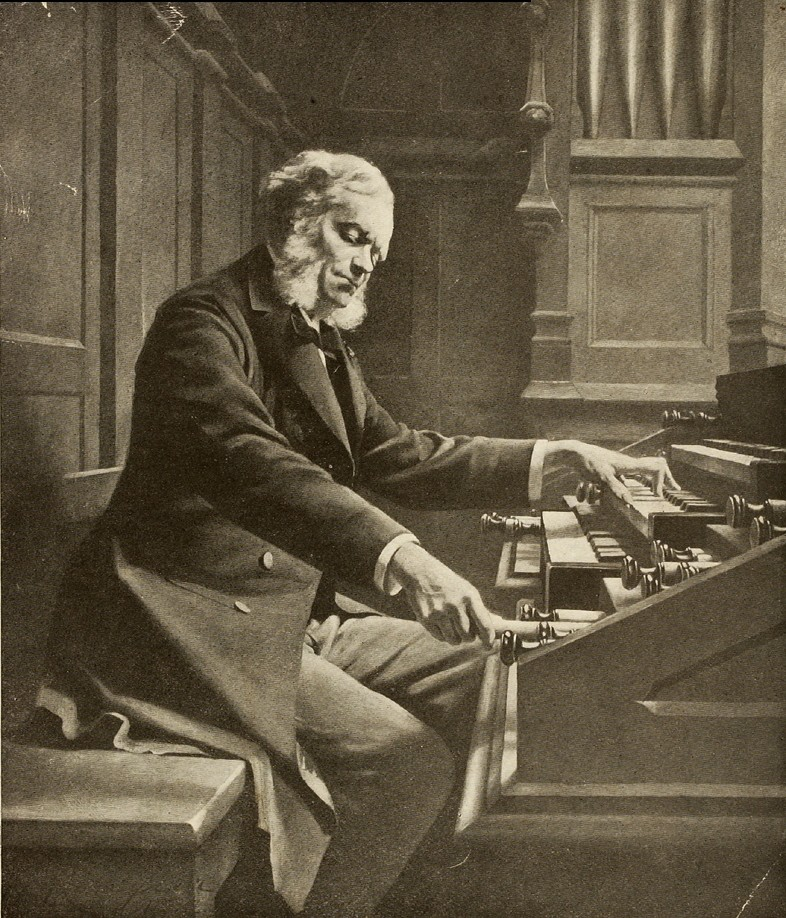
César Franck at the console, painting by Jeanne Rongier, 1888 (private collection)

In his search to master new organ-playing techniques he was both challenged and stimulated by his third and last change in organ posts. On 22 January 1858, he became maître de chapelle at the newly consecrated Sainte-Clotilde, where he remained until his death. Eleven months later, the parish installed a new three-manual Cavaillé-Coll instrument, whereupon he was made titular organist, Théodore Dubois taking over as choirmaster and assistant organist. The impact of this organ on Franck's performance and composition cannot be overestimated; together with his early pianistic experience it shaped his music-making for the remainder of his life. Norbert Dufourcq described this instrument as "unquestionably the constructor's masterpiece up to this time". Franck himself told the curé of Sainte-Clotilde: "If you only knew how I love this instrument . . . it is so supple beneath my fingers and so obedient to all my thoughts!". To prepare himself for this organ's capabilities (including its thirty-note pedal), Franck purchased a practice pedalboard from Pleyel et Cie for home practice to improve his technique, as well as spending many hours at the organ keyboard. The beauty of its sound and the mechanical facilities provided by the instrument assisted his reputation as improviser and composer, not only for organ music but in other genres as well. Pieces for organ, for choir, and for harmonium began to circulate, among the most notable of which was the Messe op. 12 (1860). Also notable is the set of Six Pièces for organ, written between 1856 and 1864 (first published 1868), including the Grande Pièce Symphonique op. 17 (1863), a prototype of the genre organ symphony. These compositions (dedicated to fellow organists and pianists, to his old master Benoist, and to Cavaillé-Coll) remain part of modern organ repertory and were, according to Rollin Smith, the first major contribution to French organ literature in over a century, and "the most important organ music written since Mendelssohn's." The group includes two of his best-known organ works, the "Prélude, Fugue et Variation", op. 18 and the "Grande Pièce Symphonique", op. 17.

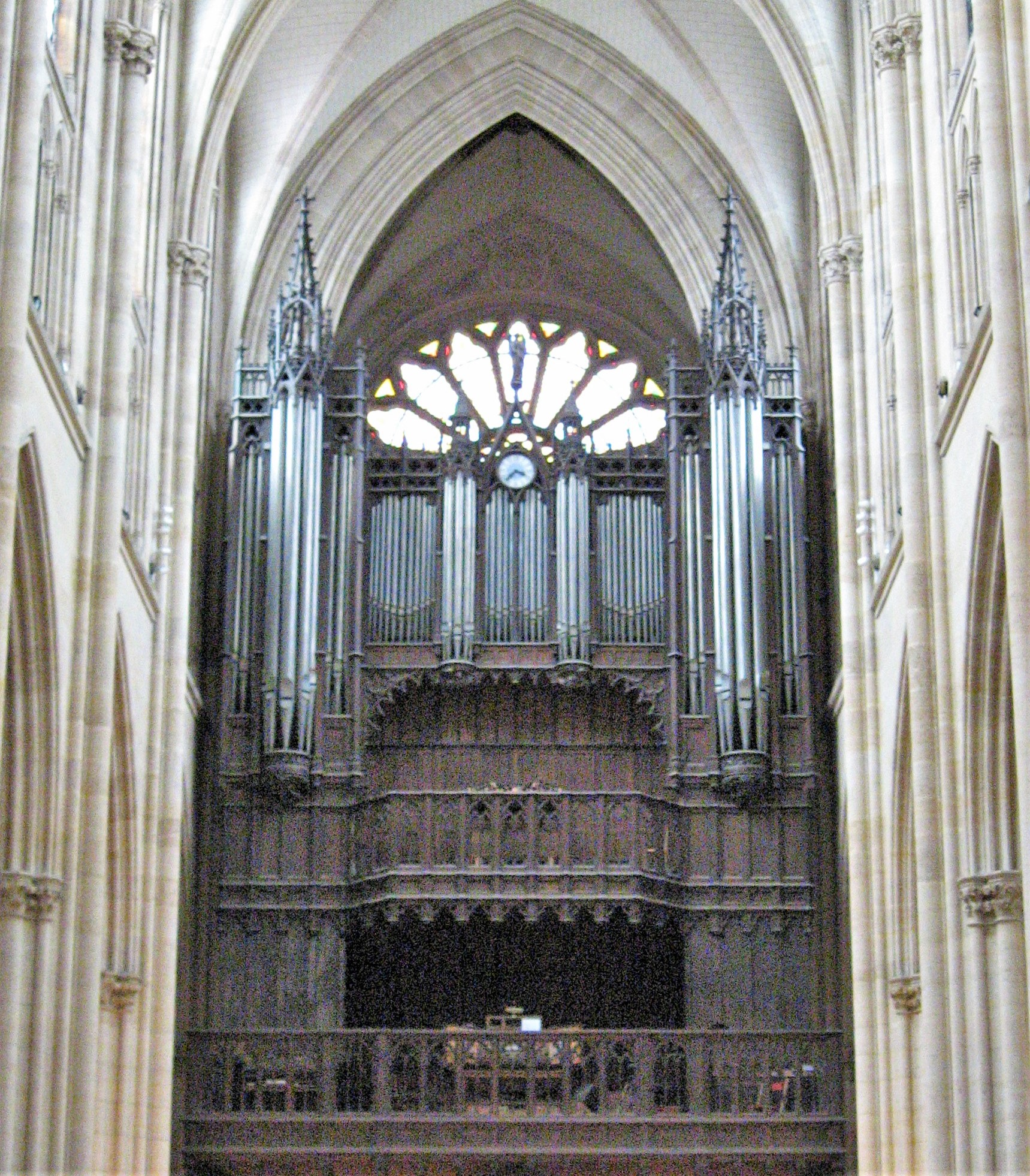
Organ of Sainte-Clotilde, Paris

His increasing reputation as both performer and improviser continued to make Franck much in demand for inaugural or dedicatory recitals of new or rebuilt Cavaillé-Coll organs: Louis James Alfred Lefébure-Wély's new instrument at Saint-Sulpice (1862) and later for organs at Notre-Dame, Saint-Étienne-du-Mont, and La Trinité; for some of these instruments, Franck had acted (by himself or with Camille Saint-Saëns) as consultant. At his own church, people began to come to hear the improvisations for the Mass and the Office. In addition, Franck began to give "organ-concerts" or recitals at Sainte-Clotilde of his own works and those of other composers. Perhaps his most notable concert arose from the attendance at a Sunday Mass in April 1866 of Franz Liszt, who sat in the choir to listen to Franck's improvisations and afterward said "How could I ever forget the man who wrote those trios?" To which Franck is supposed to have murmured a little sadly, "I fancy I have done rather better things since then.". Liszt organized a concert at Sainte-Clotilde to promote Franck's organ works later that month, which was well received by its listeners and well reported in the musical journals. Despite his comment about the trios, Franck was pleased to hear that not only Liszt but Hans von Bülow was including them in concerts in Germany on a regular basis. Franck reinforced his understanding of German organ music and how it should be played by hearing Anton Bruckner at Notre-Dame in 1869. He began to have a regular circle of pupils, who were there ostensibly for organ study but showed increasing interest in Franck's compositional techniques.

Franck continued to write compositions for choir in this period, but most were never published. As was then common even for Conservatoire-trained musicians, he had never become familiar with the polyphonic music of earlier centuries. Franck composed his liturgical works in the then-current style, which Davies characterizes as "secular music with a religious bias". Nevertheless, he was encouraged to begin work (1869) on a major choral work, Les Béatitudes, which was to occupy him for more than ten years, the delay partly due to the interruptions of the Franco-Prussian War. The war, like the 1848 Revolution, had caused many of his pupils to disappear, either because they left Paris or were killed or disabled in the fighting. Again he wrote some patriotic pieces which, in the harshness of the times, were not then performed. He and his family experienced economic hardships as his income dropped and food and fuel became scarce. The Conservatoire was closed for the academic year 1870–1871. But a change was coming in how French musicians regarded their own music; particularly after the war they were looking for an Ars Gallica that would be distinctly French. The term became the motto of the newly founded Société Nationale de Musique, of which Franck became the oldest member; his music appeared on its first program in November 1871.

=== "Père Franck", Conservatory professor, composer (1872–1890) ===
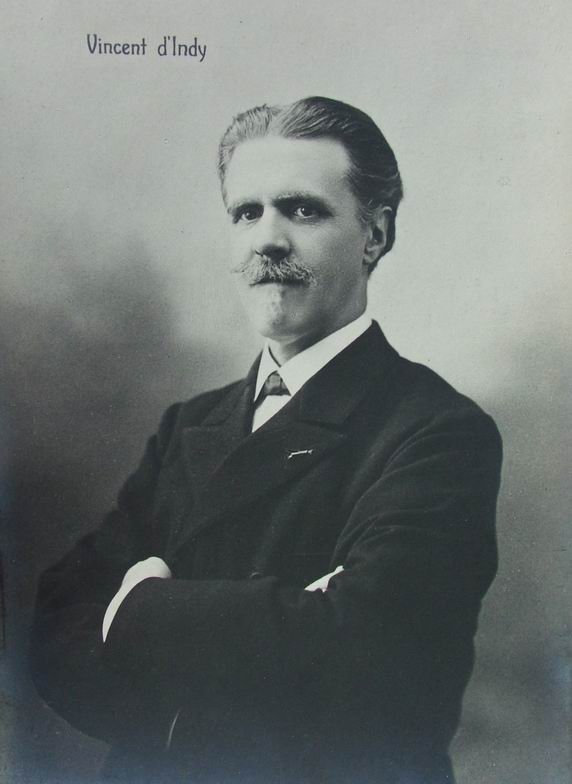
Vincent d'Indy, one of Franck's most notable students.

Franck's reputation was now widespread enough, through his fame as performer, his membership in the Société, and his smaller but devoted group of students, that when Benoist retired as professor of organ at the reopening of the Paris Conservatoire in 1872, Franck was proposed as successor. There is some uncertainty as to who made the nomination to the government; at different times Saint-Saëns and Theodore Dubois claimed responsibility, as did Cavaillé-Coll. What is certain is that Franck's name was at the head of the list of nominees—and that the nomination exposed the embarrassing fact that Franck was not a French citizen, a requirement for the appointment. It turned out that Franck did not know that when his father, Nicolas-Joseph, became a naturalized French citizen to enter his sons into the Conservatoire as students, they were counted as citizens only until age twenty-one, when they were obliged to declare their allegiance to France as adults. Franck had always regarded himself as French from the time of his father's naturalization. In fact, he had unknowingly reverted to his birth nationality of Belgian upon becoming a legal adult. Franck went through the naturalization process at once; his original appointment on 1 February 1872 was regularized in 1873.

Many of his original circle of students had studied or were studying at the Conservatoire. Among the most notable in later life were Ernest Chausson, Vincent d'Indy, Henri Duparc, Augusta Holmès, and Louis Vierne. This group became increasingly tight-knit in their mutual esteem and affection between teacher and pupils. D'Indy relates that independently but unanimously each new student came to call their professor Père Franck, "Father Franck". On the other hand, Franck experienced some tensions in his faculty life: he tended to teach composition as much as he did organ performance and improvisation; he was considered unsystematic in his teaching techniques ("Franck never taught by means of hard and fast rules or dry, ready-made theories"), with an offhand attitude towards the official texts and books approved by the Conservatoire; and his popularity among some students provoked some jealousy among his fellow professors and some counter-claims of bias on the part of those professors when judging Franck's pupils for the various prizes, including the Prix de Rome. Vallas says that Franck, "with his simple and trusting nature was incapable of understanding . . . how much back-chat of the nastier kind there could be even in a Conservatoire whose atmosphere he himself always found kindly disposed towards him."

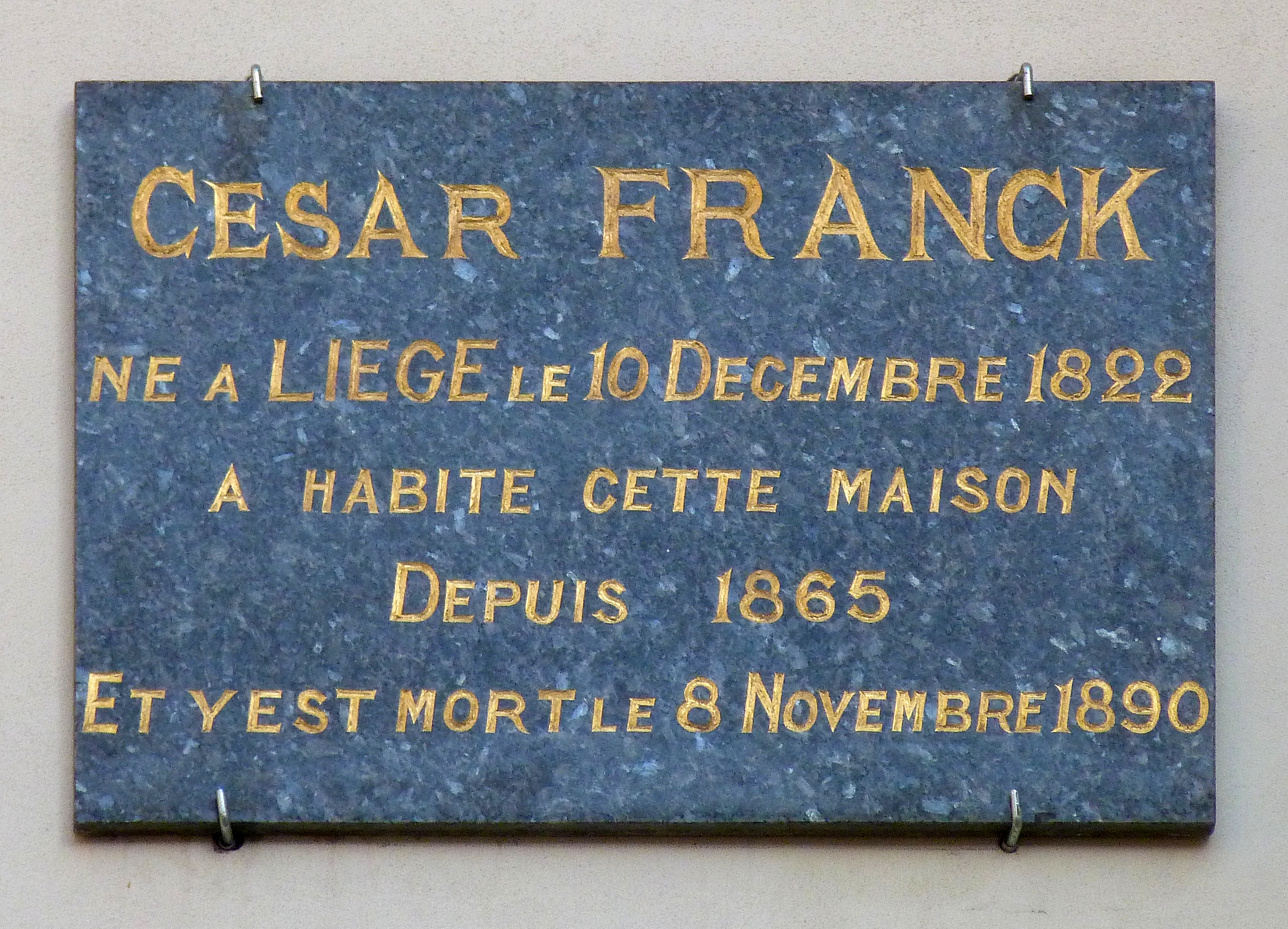
Plaque on the house, at n°95 du boulevard Saint-Michel, where Franck lived from 1865 until his death

He was now in a position to spend time composing works for which ideas had been germinating for years. He interrupted his work on Les Béatitudes to produce (among many shorter works) the oratorio Rédemption (1871–1874), the symphonic poem Les Éolides (1876), the Trois Pièces for organ (1878), and the piano Quintet (1879). Les Béatitudes (1869–1879) finally saw its first performance in 1879. As with many other premieres of Franck's larger choral and orchestral works, it was not successful: the work was highly sectionalized and lent itself to performance of excerpts rather than as a whole. There was no orchestra available, and those sections that were performed were accompanied by piano. Further, even d'Indy points out that Franck seemed incapable of musically expressing an evil contrasting to the virtues expressed in the Gospel beatitudes: "This personification of ideal evil--if it is permissible to link these terms—was a conception so alien to Franck's nature that he never succeeded in giving it adequate expression." The resulting "impression of monotony", as Vallas puts it, caused even Franck's devoted pupils to speculate on Les Béatitudes' viability as a single unified work.

Franck was finding, in the 1880s, that he was caught between two stylistic advocates: his wife Félicité, who did not care for changes in Franck's style from that to which she had first become accustomed and encouraged him to write commercially successful music; and his pupils, who had a perhaps surprising influence over their teacher as much as he over them. Vincent d'Indy is quoted as saying "When [Franck] was hesitating over the choice of this or that tonal relation or over the progress of any development, he always liked to consult his pupils, to share with them his doubts and to ask their opinions." In turn, one of Franck's students recounts that Mme Franck remarked (with some truth) that "It is you pupils who have aroused all the hostility shown against him." In addition, there were some discords within the Société Nationale, where Saint-Saëns had put himself increasingly at odds with Franck and his pupils.

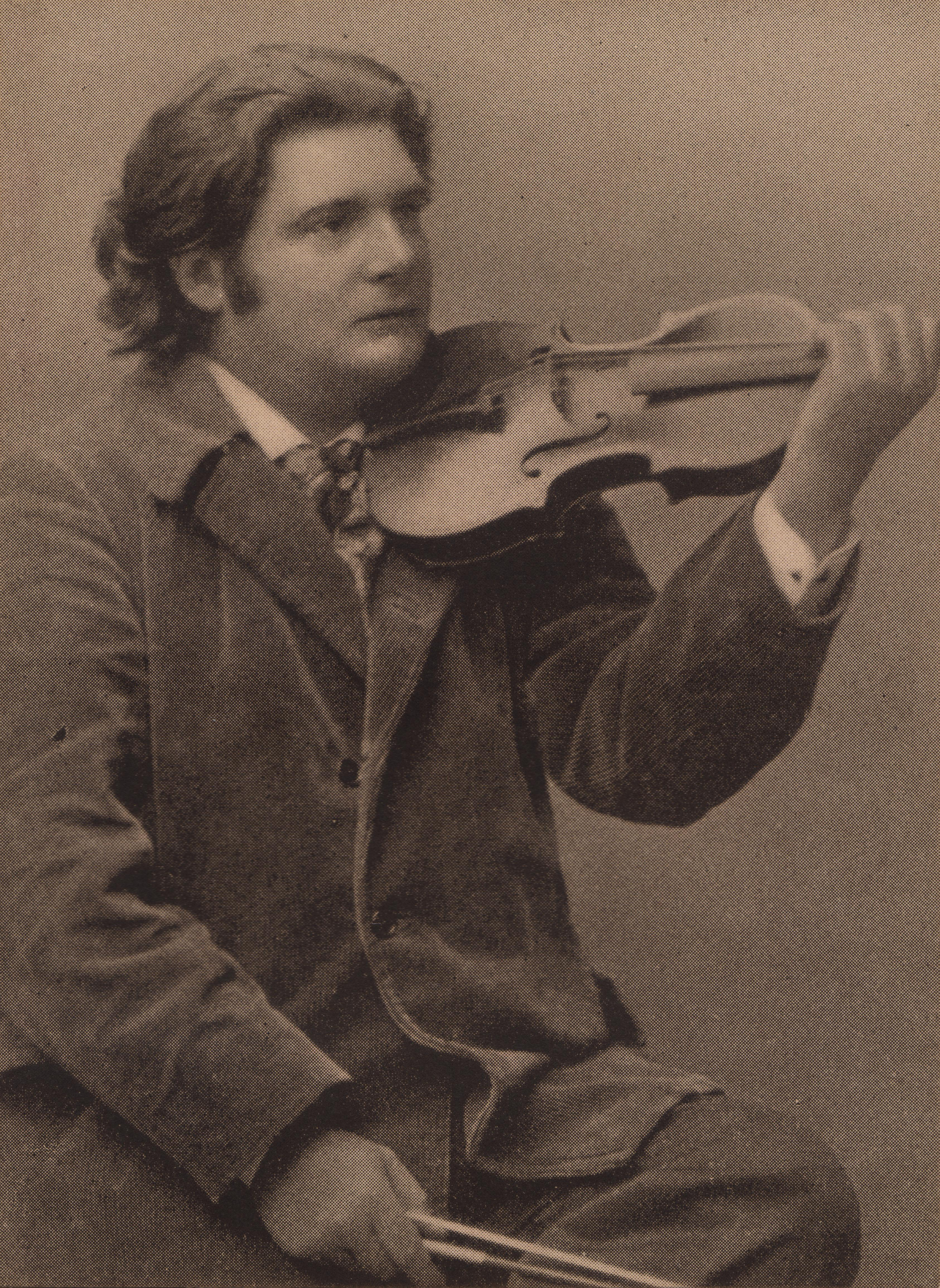
Eugène Ysaÿe, to whom Franck dedicated his Violin Sonata

How exactly all of this turmoil may have played out in the composer's mind is uncertain. It is certain that a number of his more "advanced" works appeared in this time period: the symphonic poems Le Chasseur maudit (1882) and Les Djinns (1884), the Prelude, Chorale, and Fugue for piano (1884), the Symphonic Variations (1885), and the opera Hulda (1882–1885). Many met with indifferent success or none, at least on their first presentations during Franck's lifetime; but the Quintet of 1879 (one of Saint-Saëns's particular dislikes) had proven itself an attention-getting and thought-provoking work (critics described it as having "disturbing vitality" and an "almost theatrical grimness").

In 1886, Franck composed the Violin Sonata as a wedding gift for the Belgian violinist Eugène Ysaÿe. This became a resounding success; Ysaÿe played it in Brussels, in Paris, and took it on tour, often with his brother Théo Ysaÿe at the piano. His last performance of the piece occurred in Paris during 1926, with the pianist on that occasion being Yves Nat. Vallas, writing in the mid-twentieth century, says that the Sonata had "become Franck's most popular work, and, in France at least, the most generally accepted work in the whole repertoire of chamber music."

The continuing ambiguity of esteem in which Franck was held may be shown in the award which Franck's circle had thought long delayed in its presentation. On 4 August 1885, Franck was made a Chevalier of the French Légion d'honneur. His supporters were indignant: d'Indy writes that "it would be wrong to suppose that this honor was bestowed upon the musician, the creator of the fine works which do honor to French art. Not in the least!". Instead the citation was simply as "professor of organ" having completed more than ten years in that post. Vallas goes on to state: "Public opinion made no similar mistake on this score" and quotes a journal usually opposed to Franck as saying that the award was "above all things an act of homage paid justly if a little tardily to the distinguished composer of Rédemption and Les Béatitudes."

The dissension between Franck's family and his circle of students reached a new height when Franck published Psyché (written 1887–1888), a symphonic poem based on the Greek myth. The controversy (not confined to Franck's immediate acquaintances) was not over the music, but over the philosophical and religious implications of the text (based on a poetic sketch by a certain Sicard and Louis de Fourcaud). Franck's wife and son found the work too sensual, and wanted Franck to concentrate on music wider and more popular in appeal "and altogether more commercial". D'Indy, on the other hand, speaks of its mystical significance, saying that it has "nothing of the pagan spirit about it, . . . but, on the contrary, is imbued with Christian grace and feeling . . . ." D'Indy's interpretation was subsequently described as revealing "some embarrassment, such as a newly timid Sunday-school teacher would feel if abruptly called on to acquaint riotous adolescents with The Song of Solomon."

Further controversy arose with the publication of Franck's only symphony, that in D minor (1886–1888). The work was badly received: the Conservatoire orchestra opposed, the audience "ice-cold", the critics bewildered (the reactions ranged from "unreserved enthusiasm" to "systematic disparagement"), and many of Franck's fellow composers completely out of countenance towards a work "which by its general style and even certain details" (for example, use of an English horn) "outraged the formalist rules and habits of the stricter professionals and amateurs." Franck himself, on being asked whether the symphony had any basis in a poetic idea, told Louis de Serres, a pupil, that "no, it is just music, nothing but pure music." According to Vallas, much of its style and technique can be attributed directly to the centrality of the organ in Franck's thinking and artistic life, and Franck profited from the experience. "He confided in his pupils that from thence on he would never write like that again."

1888, Franck tried his hand again at another opera, Ghiselle. It was more sketched out than composed and Franck never completed it. In contrast, a massive String Quartet was completed and performed in April 1890, and was well received by public and critics. There had been other recent successes, including his own performances as concert pianist in and around Paris, an enthusiastic reception of a revival of Psyché of a couple of years earlier, and performances of works by various of his pupils. In addition, he was still playing Sunday improvisations to usually large congregations at Sainte-Clotilde. He had in mind major works for organ and possibly a cello sonata.

=== Illness and death ===
In July 1890, Franck was riding in a cab which was struck by a horse-drawn trolley, injuring his head and causing a short fainting spell. There seemed to be no immediate after-effects; he completed his trip and he himself considered it of no importance. However, walking became painful and he found himself increasingly obliged to absent himself first from concerts and rehearsals, and then to give up his lessons at the Conservatoire. He took his vacation as soon as he could in Nemours, where he hoped to work on the proposed organ pieces as well as some commissioned works for harmonium. During the vacation, he was able to start on both projects.

While Franck could not complete the harmonium collection, the organ pieces were finished in August and September 1890. They are the Trois Chorals, which are among the greatest treasures of organ literature, and which form a regular part of the repertory today. Of them, Vallas wrote: "Their beauty and importance are such that they may be properly considered as a kind of musical last will and testament." A more recent biographer, R. J. Stove, has written in similar terms: "The sense of Franck bidding a protracted good-bye is evident throughout. ... It is hard, it is well-nigh impossible, to believe that the Chorals' composer retained any illusions about his chances of full physical mending."

Franck started the new term at the Conservatoire in October, but caught a cold mid-month. This turned into pleurisy complicated by pericarditis. After that, his condition rapidly worsened and he died on 8 November. A pathologist writing in 1970 observed that, while Franck's death has traditionally been linked to his street injury, and there may have been a connection, the respiratory infection by itself could have led to a terminal illness. Given the lack of antibiotics, this "could not be considered an unusual pattern for pneumonia in a man in his seventh decade." But this verdict has been subsequently queried: "no doubt about the 'proximate cause' was ever voiced by the two persons most likely to know, namely, Franck and his wife; nor was such a doubt ever voiced by those outside Franck's immediate household who dealt with him between July and early November 1890. ... Franck's punishing workload, 'burning the candle at both ends' over decades, could well in itself have impaired the bodily resilience he needed to fight off even a minor injury."

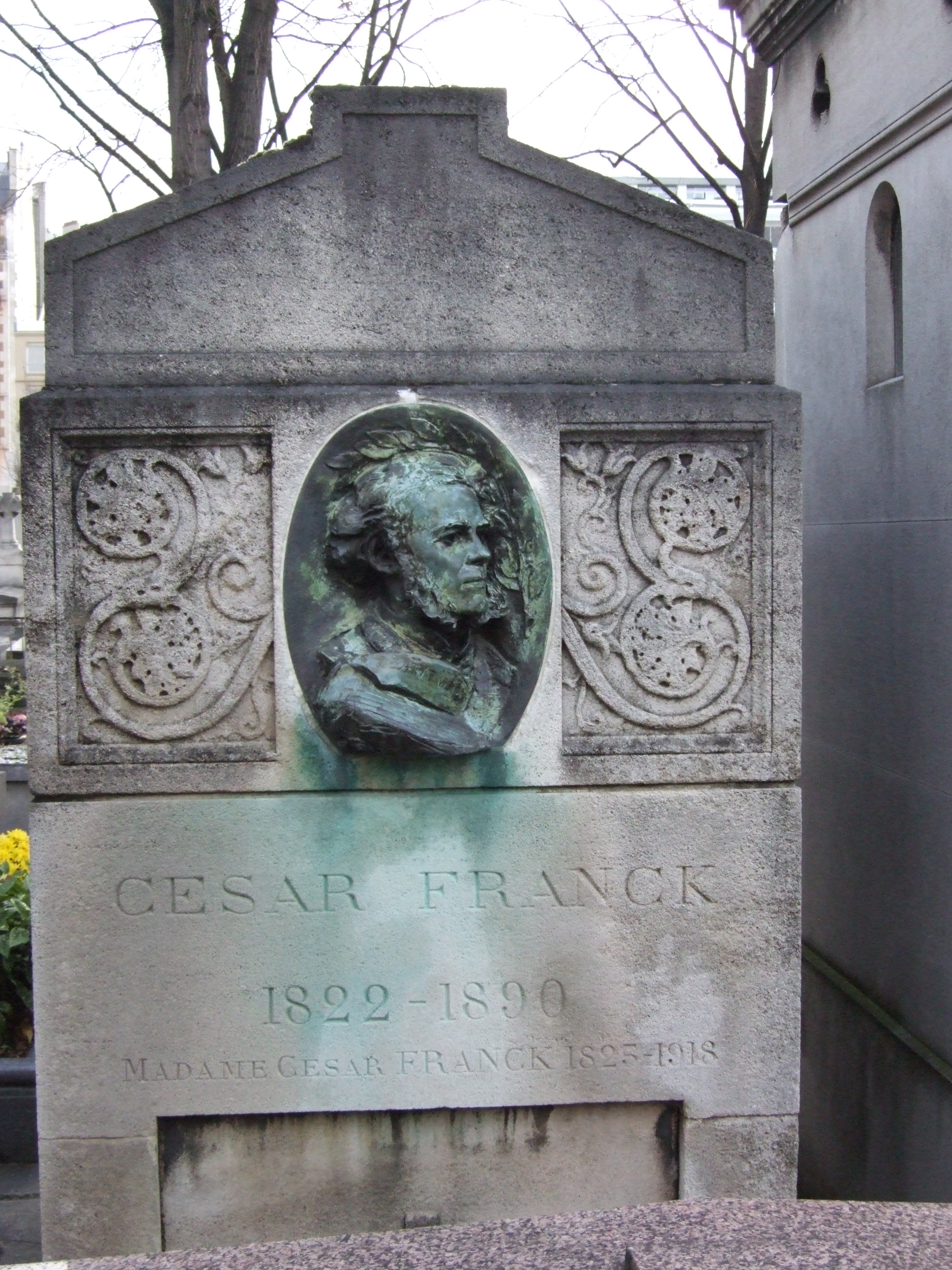
Franck's grave at Montparnasse Cemetery, with a bust by Auguste Rodin.

The funeral mass for Franck was held at Sainte-Clotilde, attended by a large congregation including Léo Delibes (officially representing the Conservatoire), Camille Saint-Saëns, Eugène Gigout, Gabriel Fauré, Alexandre Guilmant, Charles-Marie Widor (who succeeded Franck as professor of organ at the Conservatoire) and Édouard Lalo. Emmanuel Chabrier spoke at the original gravesite at Montrouge. Later, Franck's body was moved to its current location at Montparnasse Cemetery in Paris, into a tomb designed by his friend, architect Gaston Redon. A number of Franck's students, led by Augusta Holmès, commissioned a bronze medallion from Auguste Rodin, a three-quarter bust of Franck, which in 1893 was placed on the side of the tomb. In 1904, a monument to Franck by sculptor Alfred Lenoir, César Franck at the Organ, was placed in the Square Samuel-Rousseau across the street from Sainte-Clotilde.

== Music ==
Many of Franck's works employ "cyclic form", a method aspiring to achieve unity across multiple movements. This may be achieved by reminiscence, or recall, of an earlier thematic material into a later movement, or as in Franck's output where all of the principal themes of the work are generated from a germinal motif. The main melodic subjects, thus interrelated, are then recapitulated in the final movement. Franck's use of "cyclic form" is best illustrated by his Symphony in D minor (1888).

Sonata for Violin and Piano
I. Allegretto ben moderato

II. Allegro

III. Recitativo-Fantasia: Ben moderato

IV. Allegretto poco mosso
Performed by Tibor Szomora and Minami Matsunaga

His music is often contrapuntally complex, using a harmonic language that is prototypically late Romantic, showing a great deal of influence from Franz Liszt and Richard Wagner. In his compositions, Franck showed a talent and a penchant for frequent, graceful modulations of key. Often these modulatory sequences, achieved through a pivot chord or through inflection of a melodic phrase, arrive at harmonically remote keys. Indeed, Franck's students reported that his most frequent admonition was to always "modulate, modulate." Franck's modulatory style and his idiomatic method of inflecting melodic phrases are among his most recognizable traits.

Franck had huge hands (evinced by the famous photo of him at the Ste-Clotilde organ), capable of spanning the interval of a 12th on the keyboard. This allowed him unusual flexibility in voice-leading between internal parts in fugal composition, and in the wide chords and stretches featured in much of his keyboard music (e.g., his Prière and Choral I for organ). Of the Violin Sonata's writing it has been said: "Franck, blissfully apt to forget that not every musician's hands were as enormous as his own, littered the piano part (the last movement in particular) with major-tenth chords... most mere pianistic mortals ever since have been obligated to spread them in order to play them at all."

The key to his music may be found in his personality. His friends record that he was "a man of utmost humility, simplicity, reverence and industry." Louis Vierne, a pupil and later organist titulaire of Notre-Dame, wrote in his memoirs that Franck showed a "constant concern for the dignity of his art, for the nobility of his mission, and for the fervent sincerity of his sermon in sound... Joyous or melancholy, solemn or mystic, powerful or ethereal: Franck was all those at Sainte-Clotilde."

== Legacy ==
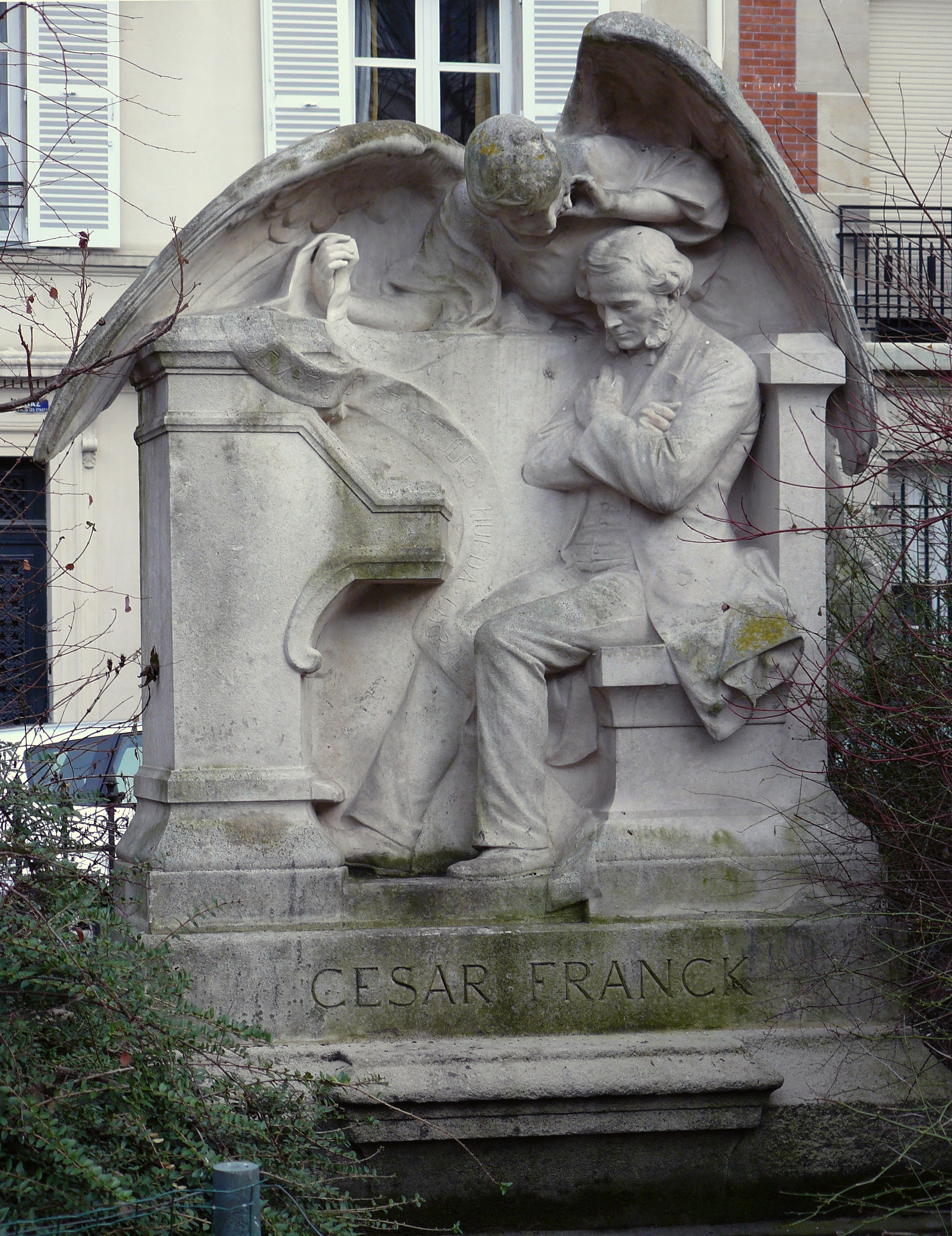
Monument to Franck at the Square Samuel-Rousseau, 7th arrondissement.

Unusually for a composer of such importance and reputation, Franck's fame rests largely on a small number of compositions written in his later years, particularly his Symphony in D minor (1886–88), the Symphonic Variations for piano and orchestra (1885), the Prelude, Chorale and Fugue for piano solo (1884), the Sonata for Violin and Piano in A major (1886), the Piano Quintet in F minor (1879), and the symphonic poem Le Chasseur maudit (1883). The Symphony was especially admired and influential among the younger generation of French composers and was highly responsible for reinvigorating the French symphonic tradition after years of decline. This was also his first and only Symphony to be composed and performed, taking him a total of 3 years, and being first performed at the Paris Conservatoire in February 1889. One of his best known shorter works is the motet setting Panis angelicus, which was originally written for tenor solo with organ and string accompaniment, but has also been arranged for other voices and instrumental combinations.

As an organist he was particularly noted for his skill in improvisation. On the basis of a mere twelve major organ works, Franck is considered by many the greatest composer of organ music after Bach. His works were some of the finest organ pieces to come from France in over a century, and laid the groundwork for the French symphonic organ style. In particular, his early Grande Pièce Symphonique, a twenty-five-minute work, paved the way for the organ symphonies of Charles-Marie Widor, Louis Vierne, and Marcel Dupré, and his late Trois Chorals are a cornerstone of the organ repertoire, featuring regularly on concert programs.

Franck exerted a significant influence on music. He helped to renew and reinvigorate chamber music and developed the use of cyclic form. Claude Debussy and Maurice Ravel remembered and employed the cyclic form, although their concepts of music were no longer the same as Franck's. Relating Franck as organist and composer to his place in French music, Rollin Smith states that "the concept of César Franck as organist and undisputed master of nineteenth-century French organ composition pervades nearly every reference to his works in other media."
