= Les Béatitudes =

Oratorio by César Franck

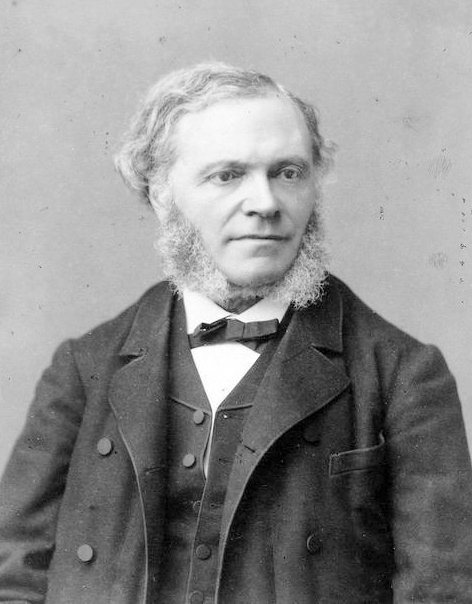
César Franck, photographed by Pierre Petit, 1887

Les Béatitudes, (Op. 25), CFF 185, FWV 53, is a French oratorio written by César Franck from 1869 to 1879 and scored for orchestra, chorus, and soloists. The text is a poetic meditation on the eight beatitudes of Jesus, from the Gospel of Matthew, by Joséphine-Blanche Colomb. It was first performed, in reduced form, on 20 February 1879 at a private performance in Franck's home in Paris. The full oratorio was not performed until after Franck's death, on 19 March 1893 in Colonne.

The work, at nearly two hours, is among Franck's largest compositions. It is scored for orchestra, choir, and eight soloists (soprano, mezzo-soprano, contralto, 2 tenors, baritone, and 2 basses).

The work is divided into eight parts and a prologue:

Prologue

1. Bienheureux les pauvres d'esprit (Blessed are the poor in spirit)
2. Bienheureux ceux qui sont doux (Blessed are the meek)
3. Bienheureux ceux qui pleurent (Blessed are they that mourn)
4. Bienheureux ceux qui ont faim et soif de la justice (Blessed are they that hunger and thirst for righteousness)
5. Heureux les miséricordieux (Blessed are the merciful)
6. Bienheureux ceux qui ont le cœur pur (Blessed are the pure in heart)
7. Bienheureux les pacifiques (Blessed are the peacemakers)
8. Bienheureux ceux qui souffrent persécution pour la justice (Blessed are those who are persecuted for righteousness' sake)

== Recordings ==
- Helmuth Rilling conducting the SWR Stuttgart Radio Symphony Orchestra, with Gilles Cachemaille, John Cheek, Keith Lewis
- Armin Jordan conducting the Nouvel Orchestre Philharmonique and Chœurs de Radio France, with Louise Lebrun, Jane Berbié, Nathalie Stutzmann, et al.
- Gergely Madaras conducting the Orchestre Philharmonique de Liège, with Anne-Catherine Gillet, David Bizic, Héloïse Mas, John Irvin et al.
