= Piano Quintet (Franck) =

1879 composition by César Franck

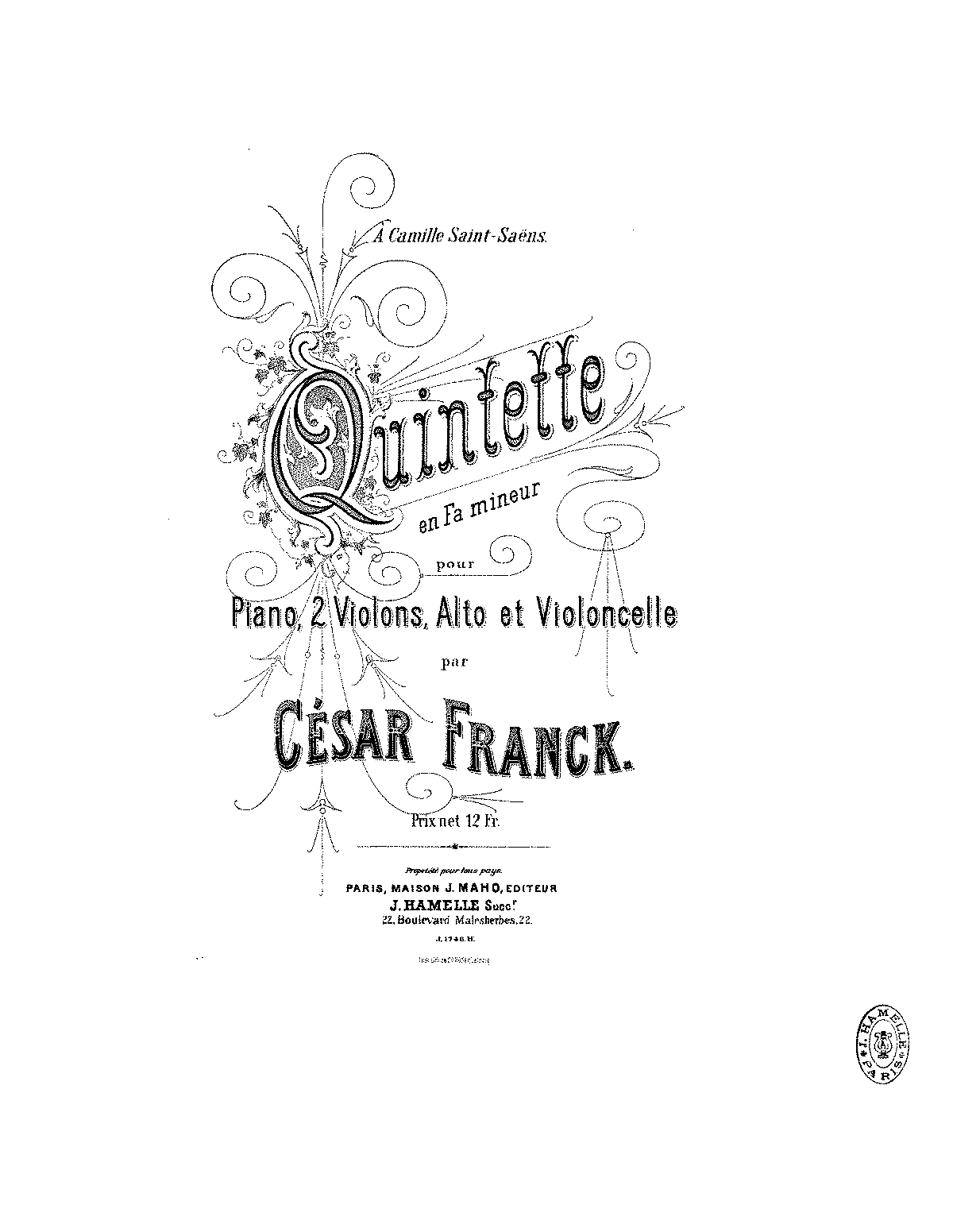
Cover of the 1st edition of the piano score (Hamelle, 1880), with dedication À Camille Saint-Saëns

César Franck's Piano Quintet in F minor is a quintet for piano, 2 violins, viola, and cello. The work was composed in 1879 and has been described as one of Franck's chief achievements alongside his other late works such as the Symphony in D minor, the Symphonic Variations, the String Quartet, and the Violin Sonata.

The work was premiered by the Marsick Quartet with Camille Saint-Saëns playing the piano part, which Franck had written out for him with an appended note: "To my good friend Camille Saint-Saëns". A minor scandal ensued when at the piece's completion, Saint-Saëns walked off stage leaving the score open at the piano, a gesture which was interpreted as a mark of disdain. That manuscript is now in the Bibliothèque nationale de France. The published form, issued by Hamelle in 1880, carries the simpler dedication "À Camille Saint-Saëns".

The work has been described as having a "torrid emotional power", and Édouard Lalo characterized it as an "explosion". Other critics have been less positively impressed; the philosopher Roger Scruton has written of the quintet's "unctuous narcissism".

== Structure ==
There are three movements:

1. Molto moderato quasi lento – Allegro
2. Lento con molto sentimento
3. Allegro non troppo ma con fuoco

The music has a cyclical character whereby a motto theme of two four-bar phrases, used 18 times in the first movement, recurs at strategic points later in the work.
