= Romain Bussine =

French opera singer (1830–1899)

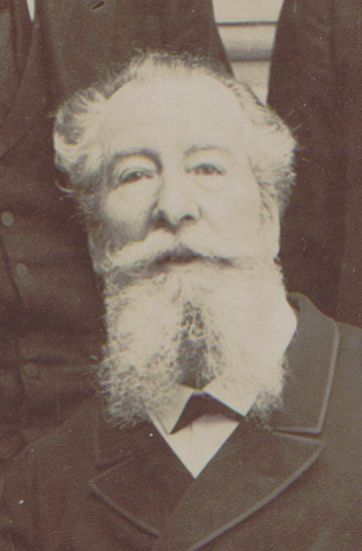
Romain Bussine

Romain Bussine (4 November 1830 – 20 December 1899) was a French voice teacher, baritone singer, translator and poet active in the second half of the 19th century.

== Career ==
He was born in Paris; and from the late 1860s until his death Bussine was professor of solfège (singing) at the city's Conservatoire. Le Monde artiste described him as teaching there for thirty years with undisputed authority.

In 1871, together with Camille Saint-Saëns he founded the Société nationale de musique as a forum for promoting contemporary French chamber and orchestral music. In the 1880s a faction within the society successfully pressed for works by foreign composers to be accepted for performance by the society, as a result of which Bussine and Saint-Saëns resigned the joint presidency of the society in 1886.

Bussine translated the words of German and other songs into French, and wrote or translated verses for his contemporaries. He made the French translations of Schumann's Scenes from Goethe's Faust and Rossini's Semiramide. He also translated La Fille du roi des Aulnes (The Erl King's Daughter), based on a Danish legend, which was published in 1878 and may originally have been intended to become an opera libretto.

Gabriel Fauré set one of Bussine's poems as Après un rêve ("After A Dream"), op. 7, No. 1 (composed in 1877, published in 1878). Another setting by Fauré of a poem by Bussine is Sérénade Toscane, a fairly free version of a slightly sardonic Tuscan serenade. Bussine was an occasional composer, writing mélodies to words by Maurice Ordonneau and others.

Bussine died of pneumonia in Paris on 20 December 1899, aged 69. Saint-Saëns, who generally avoided playing the organ after the early 1870s, made an exception and played for Bussine's funeral at Sainte-Trinité. He was survived by his wife, Virginie Antoinette Elisabeth (née de Saint-Légier).

== References and sources ==
=== Sources ===
- Johnson, Graham (2005). Un paysage choisi. London: Hyperion Records. OCLC 60709962.
- Nectoux, Jean-Michel (1984). Gabriel Fauré: His Life Through Letters. London: Boyars. ISBN 978-0-71-452768-0.
