= Prélude, Choral et Fugue (Franck) =

1884 work for solo piano

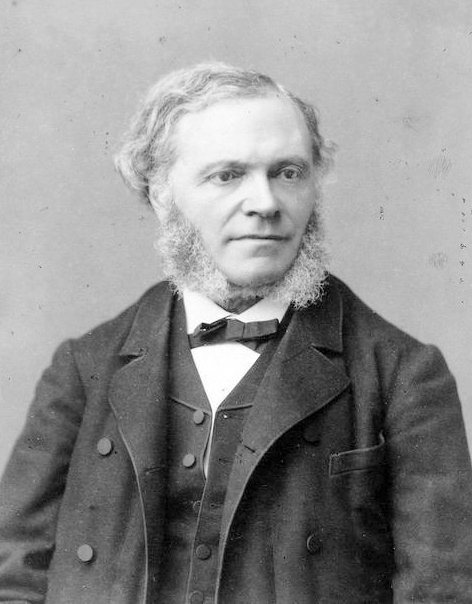
César Franck, photographed by Pierre Petit, 1887

Prélude, Choral et Fugue, FWV 21 is a work for solo piano written in 1884 by César Franck. This work is an exemplar of Franck's distinctive use of cyclic form.

== Structure ==
As the name implies, it comprises three movements: a prelude, a chorale and a fugue. The interconnectedness and thematic relationships (particularly the cyclic recall of the prelude and chorale in the fugue) make this an unorthodox example of double-function form.

It uses a Chromatic fourth motif in the chorale and the fugue. The prelude starts in B minor. The fugue returns to B minor, but ends in B major.

== In popular culture ==
The work plays a prominent part in the soundtrack of the film Vaghe stelle dell'orsa... (aka Sandra or Of a Thousand Delights), directed by Luchino Visconti and starring Claudia Cardinale. It is inserted in the track "La Fenice" by Rondò Veneziano, 1999.
