= Léon Vallas =

French musicologist (1879–1956)

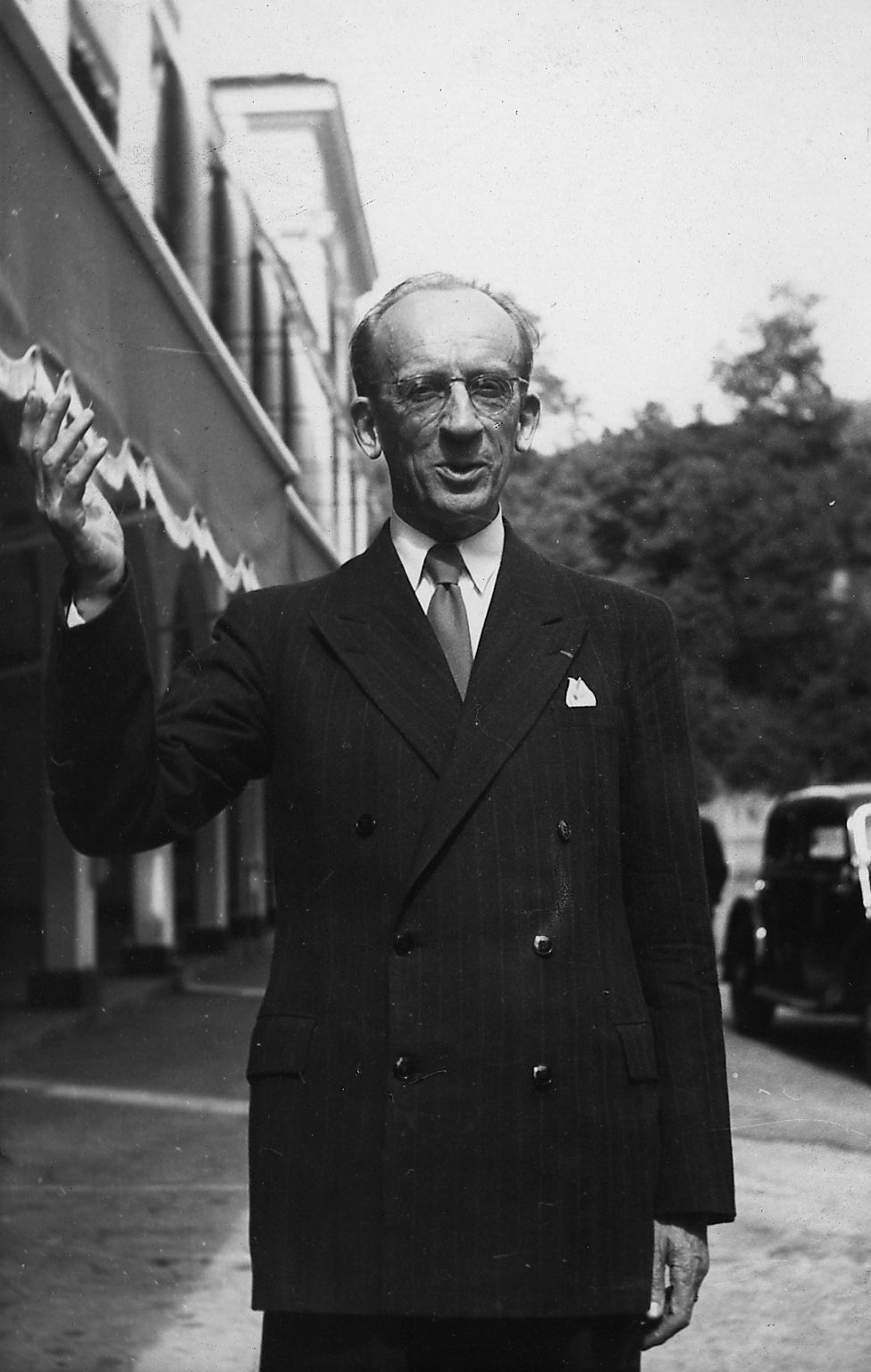
Léon Vallas in 1950

Léon Vallas (17 May 1879 – 9 May 1956) was a French musicologist and music critic. His research centered on French classical music and his publications include biographies of César Franck, Claude Debussy and Vincent d'Indy.

== Life and career ==
Léon Vallas was born on 17 May 1879 in Roanne, France. Orphaned at 8 years of age, after studying at the St. Mary's Institution at St. Chamond, held by the Marists, he passed his baccalaureate and studied medicine in Lyon, which he dropped out. In 1908, he defended a thesis of musicology on La Musique à l'Académie de Lyon au XVIIIe ("Music at the Academy of Lyon in the 17th Century").

A collaborator of Vincent d'Indy, in 1902 he became a music critic at Tout Lyon, then founded La Revue musicale de Lyon in 1903, which later became the Revue française de musique in 1912, and then the Nouvelle revue musicale in 1920. He was involved in the creation of the "Société des grands concerts" in 1905, with the composer Georges Martin Witkowski and the construction of the Salle Rameau in 1908.

A physician during the war, he received his doctorate in 1919 on Un Siècle de musique et de théâtre à Lyon (1688–1789) ("A Century of Music and Theatre in Lyon (1688–1789)") and returned to Le Progrès in Lyon where he was a music critic for 35 years.

In 1925, he founded the "Conférences de musique vivante" in Paris and taught courses at the Sorbonne from 1928 to 1930. From 1929 to 1935, he lectured worldwide for the Alliance Française, which led him to be made Chevalier de la Légion d'honneur in 1934.

He was elected president of the Société française de musicologie in 1937, until 1943 and a member of the Academy of Sciences, Humanities and Arts of Lyon in 1947. He applied twice (1924 and 1941), unsuccessfully, to the leadership of the Conservatoire de musique de Lyon.

He married pianist and singer Paule de Lestang in 1936, and then resided until his death at 286 rue Vendôme, in Lyon on 9 May 1956.

His biographies of Franck, Debussy and D'Indy constitute the essence of his work as a historian.

== Publications ==
- La Musique à l'Académie de Lyon au dix-huitième siècle (Lyon: Éditions de la Revue musicale de Lyon, 1908) (Read online)
- Le Théâtre et la Ville: 1694–1712 (Lyon: Cumin et Masson, 1919)
- Debussy (1862–1918) (Paris: Plon, 1926)
- Un Siècle de musique et de théâtre à Lyon (1688–1789) (Lyon: Masson, 1932)
- Les Idées de Claude Debussy, musicien français (Paris: Éditions musicales de la Librairie de France, 1927; translated into English by Maire O'Brien, Oxford: University Press, 1929)
- Claude Debussy et son temps (Paris: F. Alcan, 1932; reissued Paris: Albin Michel, 1958; translated into German, Munich: Nymphenburger Verlags-Handlung, 1961)
- Achille-Claude Debussy (Paris: Presses universitaires de France, 1944) (rééd. 1949)
- Vincent d'Indy (Paris: Albin Michel, 2 vols. (1. La Jeunesse, 1851–1886, 1946; 2. La Maturité, la vieillesse, 1886–1931, 1949)
- La Véritable histoire de César Franck (Paris: Flammarion, 1955)
