= Symphonic Variations (Franck) =

Work for piano and orchestra by César Franck

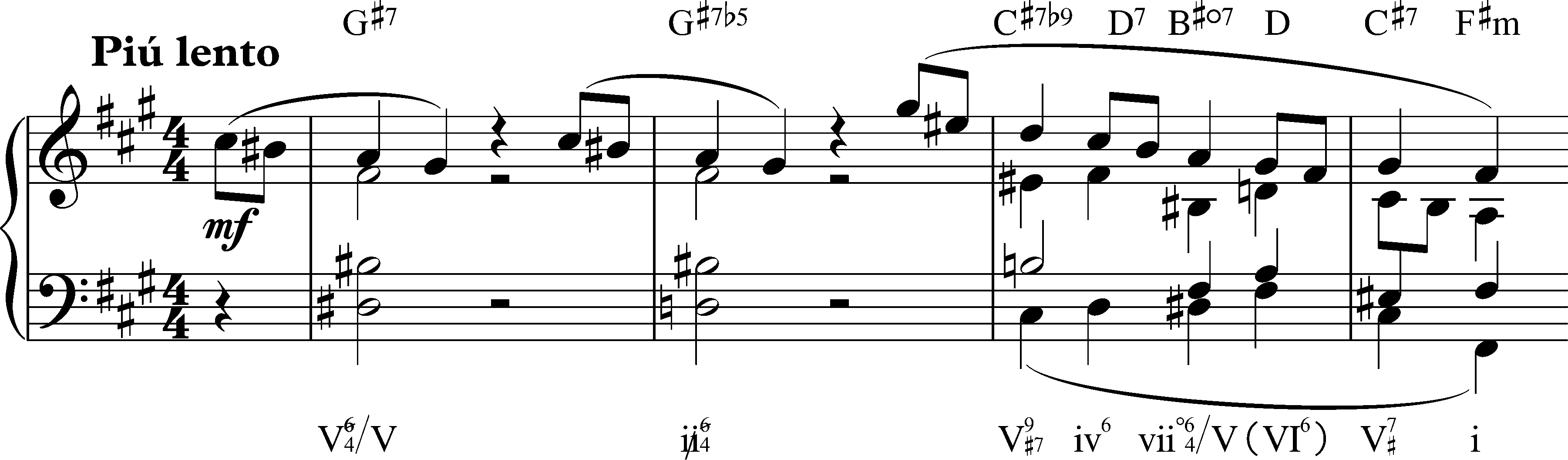
Second phrase, mm.5-9, the first at tempo lento, from Cesar Franck's Variations symphoniques (1885), features chromaticism from use of borrowed chords and, "descending bass lines," (voice leading) and demonstrates that, "chromatic evasiveness internally in the phrases [may be] countered by cadence strength and clarity," such as the, "resolute movement from V of V to V to I."

The Symphonic Variations (Variations symphoniques), M. 46, is a work for piano and orchestra written in 1885 by César Franck. It has been described as "one of Franck's tightest and most finished works", "a superb blending of piano and orchestra", and "a flawless work and as near perfection as a human composer can hope to get in a work of this nature". It is a fine example of Franck's use of cyclic unity, with one theme growing into various others. The piano and orchestra share equally in the development of ideas. The work is in F♯ minor (with the last movement in F♯ major). Duration in performance is about fifteen minutes, and the instrumentation is piano solo and orchestra: pairs of flutes, oboes, clarinets, and bassoons; four horns; two trumpets; timpani; and strings.

== History ==
The work was dedicated to Louis Diémer, who on 15 March 1885 had premiered Les Djinns, a symphonic poem for piano and orchestra that brought Franck one of his rare critical successes. He promised to reward Diémer with "a little something", and the similarly scored Symphonic Variations was the result. Franck started work in the summer of 1885, and completed the piece on 12 December.

== Premiere ==
The premiere on 1 May 1886, at the annual orchestral concert of the Société Nationale de Musique, went almost unnoticed. The soloist was Diémer, and the composer conducted. The second performance was not until 30 January 1887, at a concert devoted entirely to Franck under the conductor Jules Pasdeloup, with Diémer again as soloist. It still failed to impress.

Before and after Franck's death, however, his works were championed by his students, including Vincent d'Indy, Henri Duparc, Paul Dukas, and Ernest Chausson; and the Symphonic Variations soon entered the repertoire of major pianists. It was mainly through the Symphony in D minor and the Symphonic Variations that Franck became posthumously famous. The work is now regularly performed, and has been recorded many times. It was later arranged for two pianos, four hands.

The British premiere occurred on 23 October 1902 at the Promenade Concerts, under the baton of Henry Wood.

== Structure ==
While there is no doubt that it demonstrates Franck's mastery of variation form, the overall structure of the Symphonic Variations has been a matter of debate. Donald Tovey called it "a finely and freely organized fantasy, with an important episode in variation form". It has three broad parts, played without a break: introduction, theme and variations, and finale. These parts resemble the fast–slow–fast layout of a three-movement concerto. While the whole piece is thematically unified, the proper variations occupy only the central third of the work. The introduction has reminded many commentators of the theme of the slow movement of Beethoven's Piano Concerto No. 4 in G.

The entire work is based on two themes. The first part begins in the home key of F♯ minor with different elements of the themes played by the orchestra and the piano (Poco allegro). Soon both themes get a proper statement, the first (ascending) in A major by the orchestra (L'istesso tempo), the second (descending) in C♯ minor by the piano (Poco più lento). A transitional section with orchestra and piano interplay (Allegro — Allegretto quasi andante) lead to the second part of the work.

It is this second part that contains the variations. The main theme (the ascending one) is announced by the piano. It is in F♯ minor. The variations follow. Their number is debated, ranging from six to fifteen, depending on how one counts: brief variations having similar character can be analyzed as just sections of longer and more complex variations.

The last variation is marked Molto più lento. It changes the mode from minor to major (F♯ major). After this, the music returns to minor for a new transitional episode, in which the descending theme reappears played by the strings con sordini with a mysterious piano arpeggio accompaniment. It is quite long (about 2 minutes) and ends with a piano trill announcing the final part.

The work ends with a brilliant final in the parallel F♯ major (Allegro non troppo). It is a compact sonata-form movement, complete with first (the descending theme) and second (the ascending theme) subjects, development, and recapitulation. The second subject appears at first in D major and returns in F♯ major.

== Arrangements ==
In 1946 the choreographer Frederick Ashton used Franck's work for a ballet, also called Symphonic Variations.

Ralph Vaughan Williams's Fantasia (quasi variazione) on the Old 104th Psalm Tune for piano, chorus, and orchestra (1949) has some similarities to the Symphonic variations, but it lacks Franck's adherence to classical variation form.
