= Symphony No. 4 (Villa-Lobos) =

Song composed by Heitor Villa-Lobos

- A Vitória
- by Heitor Villa-Lobos
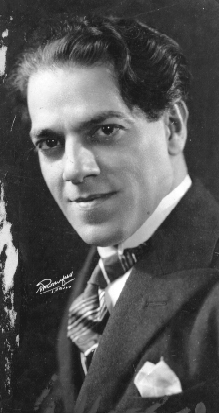
- Heitor Villa-Lobos
- English: The Victory
- Catalogue: W153
- Composed: 1919
- Published: 1978
- Publisher: Ricordi (Brazil), Belwin Mills
- Recorded: 10 June 1955 – 13 June 1956: Paris, Orchestre National de la Radiodiffusion Française, conducted by Villa-Lobos
- Duration: 30 min
- Movements: Four
- Scoring: orchestra; brass band

Premiere
- Date: September 1920:
- Location: Theatro Municipal (Rio de Janeiro)
- Conductor: Heitor Villa-Lobos
- Performers: Orquestra Sinfônica do Theatro Municipal

Symphony No. 4 is a composition by the Brazilian composer Heitor Villa-Lobos, written in 1919. This symphony is subtitled A Vitória (The Victory), while its predecessor and successor are subtitled A Guerra (War) and A Paix (Peace), respectively. It is also the fourth in a cycle of five symphonies in the style of Vincent d'Indy.

Villa-Lobos composed his Fourth Symphony in Rio de Janeiro in 1919, beginning in October, as the second in a trilogy of programmatic symphonies based on arguments by Luís Gastão d'Escragnolle Dória. It was first performed at the Theatro Municipal in Rio de Janeiro, together with the Third Symphony, in September 1920 by the Orchestra do Theatro Municipal conducted by the composer.

A recording conducted by the composer lasts just over 30 minutes.

== Recordings ==
- From 10 to 13 June 1955 Villa-Lobos made a recording of this symphony at the Salle de la Mutualité in Paris with the Orchestre National de la Radiodiffusion Française.
- 1996, Diemecke, Dorian (dist. Naxos)
- 1997, St. Clair, CPO
- 2012, Karabtchevsky, Naxos

== Instrumentation ==
The symphony is scored for a large orchestra and brass band.

- The orchestra consists of 2 piccolos, 3 flutes, 2 oboes, cor anglais, 2 clarinets, bass clarinet, soprano saxophone, alto saxophone, tenor saxophone, baritone saxophone, 3 bassoons, contrabassoon, 4 horns, 4 trumpets, 4 trombones, tuba, percussion (timpani, cymbals, bass drum, drum, side drum, tam-tam, bells, sistrum, small frame drum, chocalho, sleigh bells, triangle, and xylophone), celesta, 2 harps, piano, and strings.
- The wind band consists of E♭ clarinet, soprano saxophone, alto saxophone, euphonium, cornets, bugles, horn, 1 or more saxhorns, bass trombone, contrabass trombone in E♭, contrabass trombone in B♭, and bass drum.
- There is also a concertino ensemble made up of E♭ clarinet, soprano, alto, and tenor saxophones, euphonium, small frame drum, triangle, cymbals, and bass drum.

== Analysis ==
The work is in four movements:

1. Allegro impectuoso [sic]
2. Andantino
3. Andante
4. Lento – Allegro

The Fourth Symphony employs the principle of cyclic form. The main theme of the first movement recurs in all of the following movements, with the aim of providing unity to the whole work. Moreover, themes from Villa-Lobos's Third Symphony are also quoted here, which has sometimes incorrectly been assumed to imply that these two symphonies were originally a single work.
