= Symphony No. 3 (Villa-Lobos) =

- A Guerra
- by Heitor Villa-Lobos
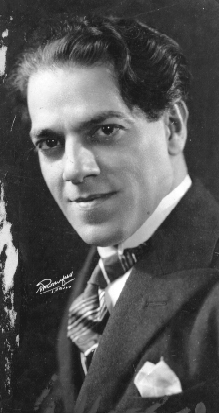
- Heitor Villa-Lobos
- English: War
- Catalogue: W152
- Composed: May 1919 – 12 June 1919: Rio de Janeiro (revised ca. 1955)
- Published: 1955: Rio de Janeiro; New York
- Publisher: Ricordi (Brazil); Belwin-Mills
- Movements: Four
- Scoring: orchestra; brass band; optional SATTB chorus

Premiere
- Date: September 1920
- Location: Theatro Municipal, Rio de Janeiro
- Conductor: Heitor Villa-Lobos
- Performers: Orquestra Sinfônica do Theatro Municipal

Symphony No. 3 is a composition by the Brazilian composer Heitor Villa-Lobos, written in 1919. A typical performance lasts about 35 minutes.

== History ==
In 1919, Villa-Lobos was commissioned to write a symphony to celebrate the Treaty of Versailles. In response, he composed his Third Symphony in Rio de Janeiro, beginning work in early May and finishing the score less than six weeks later, on 12 June 1919. The work is subtitled A Guerra (War) and the manuscript also designates it the "1a Sinfonia Simbólica" (First Symbolic Symphony). It is the first of a trilogy of programmatic symphonies based on arguments by Luís Gastão d'Escragnolle Dória, the others being subtitled A Vitória (Victory) and A Paz (Peace), as well as being the third in a cycle of five symphonies written in the style of Vincent d'Indy.

The first two movements were presented on 31 July 1919 in the Theatro Municipal, Rio de Janeiro, by the Orchestra do Theatro Municipal conducted by the composer, as part of a concert dedicated to the President of Brazil, Epitácio Pessoa. The complete symphony was first performed (together with the Fourth Symphony) in the same venue and by the same forces in September 1920, in a concert given in honour of Albert I and Elisabeth of Bavaria, the King and Queen of Belgium. However, it appears that at this time the symphony had only three movements. The slow movement, Lento e marcial, "certainly did not exist before 1946", and was probably added shortly before the work was published in 1955.

== Instrumentation ==
There are two manuscript scores of the symphony, one lacking the third movement and with a somewhat larger instrumentation than the later manuscript (and published) version. It is scored for the following groups:

1. An orchestra consisting of piccolo, 2 (or 4) flutes, 2 oboes, cor anglais, 2 (or 4) clarinets, bass clarinet, 3 bassoons, contrabassoon, 4 (or 8) horns, 4 trumpets (or cornets), 4 trombones, tuba, percussion (4 timpani, tam-tam, cymbals, matracas, 2 (or 4) bass drums, 2 (or 4) side drums, and xylophone), celesta, 2 harps, piano, and strings
2. A small brass band consisting of piccolo bugle in E♭, 2 bugles in B♭, 4 cornets, 4 trombones, 2 alto saxhorns, 2 bass saxhorns, 2 contrabass saxhorns in B♭, and 2 contrabass saxhorns in E♭
3. In the last movement, an optional mixed chorus

The earlier, three-movement version also specified the numbers of string instruments: 26 first violins, 24 second violins, 12 violas, 12 cellos, and 12 double basses, bringing the total number of orchestral players to 164, surpassing the gigantic orchestras called for by Richard Strauss in Elektra and Salome

== Analysis ==
The symphony in its final form has four movements:

1. Allegro quasi giusto: "A vida e o labor" (Life and Work)
2. Como um scherzo: "Intrigas e cochichos" (Intrigues and Whispers)
3. Lento e marcial: "Sofrimento" (Suffering)
4. Allegro impetuoso: "A batalha" (Battle)

Unlike Villa-Lobos's two preceding symphonies and the following one, the Third Symphony does not use cyclic techniques internally, though there is a neighbour-note motive found in all four movements. More unusually, several themes from this symphony recur in the Fourth Symphony, creating cyclic relationships between these two independent works.

Although Villa-Lobos took great care in the construction of the first movement, its form is by no means clear cut. If it is viewed as a traditional sonata-allegro, then there is very little development in the middle section. In the recapitulation, Villa-Lobos seeks to create contrasting colouration from the way the thematic material was originally presented in the exposition. For example, in the opening bars, the first theme is given to the woodwinds (later joined by horns and cornet), and the strings accompany with a semiquaver figure; in the recapitulation, the second violins and violas have the theme, accompanied by the semiquaver figure in clarinet and bassoon. The movement can also be seen as a sort of modified rondo form (ABCDA'B' plus coda), in which the D section is essentially episodic. However, the two occurrences of the refrain (A) are in the dominant and supertonic keys of G and D, and the overall tonic key, C, is reached only in the concluding coda.

The main theme of the second movement was inspired by the scherzo of Tchaikovsky's Sixth Symphony.
