= Augustin Savard =

Augustin Savard may refer to

- Marie Gabriel Augustin Savard (1814–1881), French composer
- Marie Emmanuel Augustin Savard (1861–1942), French composer, his son
