= Rhondda Gillespie =

Australian-born British-Barbadian classical pianist

Rhondda Gillespie (4 August 1941 – 30 December 2010) was an Australian-born classical pianist who resided primarily in the United Kingdom and Barbados. She was a specialist in the music of Franz Liszt and brought to light many of his lesser-known works. She was also renowned for her focus on contemporary music, and she gave many world premieres of British music.

== Career ==
Rhondda Marie Gillespie was born in Sydney in 1941, the only child of architect David Gillespie and his wife Marie (née Saywell). At age 8 she played Manuel de Falla's Ritual Fire Dance on Jack Davey's radio show Star Search.

She gave her first public recital at 12. Her formal studies were at the Sydney Conservatorium of Music under Alexander Sverjensky (where her fellow students included Malcolm Williamson, Richard Farrell and Roger Woodward) and in Britain under Louis Kentner and Denis Matthews.

Wilfred Josephs' 14 Studies for Piano, Op. 53 were written for Gillespie, Joy Blech, and Yonty Solomon. Gillespie gave the world premiere of the complete set at the Cheltenham Festival in 1967.

She was the second wife of the music critic and musicologist Denby Richards. They married on 29 May 1973, but divorced in 1977.

In 1976, for Joseph Horovitz's 50th birthday, Gillespie played his Jazz Concerto at the Queen Elizabeth Hall. She played Franz Liszt's piano transcription of Hector Berlioz's Symphonie fantastique at the 1977 London Liszt Festival. With the actor Michael Gough she also gave the first complete performance in London of Liszt's dramatic recitations.

In 1984, Gillespie and her fellow Australian pianist Robert Weatherburn formed a professional duo to present repertoire for piano four-hands and two pianos. They toured Malta and England and appeared in Sydney. There they premiered John Dankworth's Fantasia Enigmatica in 1986. In 1987, at the Sydney Opera House, they gave the world premieres of Weatherburn's arrangement for two pianos of Liszt's Geharnischte Lied and of his own composition for two pianos, Mnajdra.

They gave the Southern Hemisphere premiere of Liszt's Concerto pathétique for 2 pianos. For Malcolm Arnold's 70th birthday they played his Concerto for Piano Four-hands and Strings, and for his 80th birthday the Concerto for Two Pianos and Orchestra. Miriam Hyde and other composers wrote works for Gillespie and Weatherburn.

== Death ==
Rhondda Gillespie ceased playing in the 1990s due to arthritis in her fingers. She had come to spend much of her time (including the English winters) in Barbados, where she died on 30 December 2010, aged 69. Her former husband Denby Richards had died on 7 December.

== Awards ==
She won the Harriet Cohen Commonwealth Medal in 1959.

== Recordings ==
Rhondda Gillespie's recordings included:

- the world premiere recording of the piano sonata by Constant Lambert (1974)
- Usko Meriläinen's First Piano Concerto (Royal Philharmonic Orchestra under Walter Susskind)
- Franz Liszt's Weihnachtsbaum, Sonata in B minor, Consolations and 2 Ballades
- music by Charles Camilleri, Percy Grainger and Johann Sebastian Bach.
