= Decet (Enescu) =

Decet Dixtuor à vents
- Chamber music by George Enescu
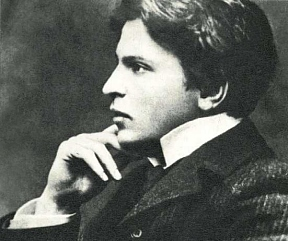
- George Enescu in the 1910s
- Key: D major
- Opus: 14
- Composed: 1906
- Performed: 12 June 1906 Paris
- Duration: 23 minutes
- Movements: 3
- Scoring: 10 wind instruments

The Decet for winds (Dixtuor à vents) in D major, Op. 14, is a chamber music work by the Romanian composer George Enescu, written in 1906 and first performed in Paris the same year.

Enescu composed his Decet swiftly, in the first months of 1906. He had just finished his First Symphony, Op. 13, the previous year. The Decet was given its first performance in Paris (less than six months after the symphony) on 12 June 1906 at a concert of the Société Moderne d'Instruments à Vent.

A typical performance lasts about 23 minutes.

== Analysis ==
The Decet is scored for two flutes, oboe, cor anglais, two clarinets, two bassoons, and two horns—in other words, a double wind quintet, with cor anglais in place of the second oboe. It is both a "sensationally orchestrated chamber work" and a "superb symphony in D".

Although it is easy to associate Enescu's Octet for Strings and the Decet because of their similar instrumental scheme (a double string quartet and a double wind quintet, respectively), they are very different in structure and style. While the four movements of the Octet are united by cyclic thematic procedures into a single sonata-allegro form, the Decet is more of a relaxed divertimento on the model of wind serenades of the Classical era, with a nod to the serenades of the Romantic period as well. Enescu’s customary cyclic thematic treatment does not appear in this work: Themes do not recur from one movement to another, nor are multiple themes built from the same generating cells.

The overall rhapsodic quality of the Decet disguises its classical structures, worked out with thematic economy and contrapuntal workmanship of considerable finesse. This relaxed style results in part from the unpredictable spontaneity with which the themes are presented, as well as from the considerable liberty with which Enescu treats the familiar forms. In addition, contrast of tonalities is minimized (similar to the design of Enescu’s Second Violin Sonata, composed seven years earlier), here in the interests of maintaining a unified atmosphere. Instead of a definite contrast, each new theme presents only a new hue. Even the most lively elements, such as the brisk dance-like theme in the middle section of the second movement, or the main theme of the finale do not disturb the predominating feeling of gentle nostalgia and soothed sorrow.

The Decet is in three movements:

1. Doucement mouvementé
2. Modérément – Vivement
3. Allègrement, mais pas trop vif

=== I. Doucement mouvementé ===
The first movement is in an expanded sonata-allegro form. The gentle opening theme is perfectly diatonic, in D major. The extremely soft dynamic prescribed for all the instruments minimizes timbral contrasts, resulting in the effect of an ensemble of equal voices. The theme is spun out over twenty-three bars in free contrapuntal imitation, after the manner of a ricercar by Andrea Gabrieli. A second theme, also diatonic, is then announced by bassoons and horns, beginning a fugato with six entrances, alternating the relative natural-minor key (B Aeolian) and its upper fifth (F♯ Aeolian), followed by a brief return to the opening theme, now in the dominant key of A major. At first this seems to suggest a complete, compact sonata exposition, but it proves to be a two-part initial thematic group. Instead of the expected transition to a development section, Enescu now presents his second thematic group, which is in two parts like the first. Beginning in the remote key of C♯ major with a theme in the cor anglais marked très expressif (mais) sans rigueur, the group's second theme follows immediately, and the exposition proper ends in the dominant key of A major.

The development section is predominantly melodic, with new large-breathed phrases emerging from the previously presented themes. The fugato second theme at first takes the lead, then is contrapuntally interwoven with the first theme in iridescent orchestrational colours. The unorthodox recapitulation begins with fragments of the first theme presented in various keys, then quasi-developmentally juxtaposing the first three themes for about thirty bars, "the way fragments scattered away by an explosion might fall back again". The two themes of the second thematic group are then recapitulated together, transposed a semitone upward to begin in the tonic, D major (instead of the C♯ major of the exposition), but closing therefore unexpectedly in B♭ major, forte, in the first horn. A developmental coda reworks all four themes in a gradual relaxation in the tonic, D major, and the movement closes with a final statement of the first theme in augmentation, ending with a plagal cadence.

=== II. Modérément – Vivement ===
The second movement has a more overt connection to folklore than the other two. It is cast in a tripartite form, though not quite the conventional A–B–A pattern. The first section deploys a theme of an epic, nostalgic character, with a loose rhythmic design resembling the parlando-rubato style found in some genres of Romanian popular music. The scoring of this melody with the oboe and cor anglais in octaves and the flutes playing a winding accompaniment in unison between the two double reeds is a remarkable orchestrational touch. A short tutti interlude is followed by a more florid variant of the theme, in which the ornamental appoggiaturas, mordents, and auxiliary notes are especially striking.

The onset of the central section, marked "Vivement", supplies the only sharp contrast of mood in the entire composition. The tempo abruptly doubles, and the key turns from the minor to major, with some passages in the even brighter Lydian mode. The key centre, however, remains firmly anchored on D. An initial double pedal point on D and A supports a playful, folklike tune, evoking the sound of bagpipes. The return to the initial, slow tempo brings back the nostalgic opening theme, but at first in the key of B major, then in B♭ minor, before finally settling back into the tonic key of D minor. This turns into a development, in which the lively tune from the middle section serves as accompaniment to the slow theme. The energy disperses and the slow theme disappears, leaving the pedal-point D and the bassoon playing fragments of the playful theme from the central part, only now in the minor key. The gloomy, lonely quality ends at last with a pianissimo Picardy cadence.

=== III. Allègrement, mais pas trop vif ===
The finale, by its carefree quality and specific expressive elements, contributes significantly to the divertimento character of the work. At the same time, its structure is "one of the strangest sonata forms one might encounter and includes some of the most virtuosic contrapuntal textures in the whole piece".

The exposition is straightforward enough. A first theme in the tonic key of D major is built of a chain of motives offering rich opportunities for development. The continuation of this theme involves a modal shift to the Lydian mode over the same tonic, a procedure recalling the cheerful middle-section tune from the second movement. The second thematic group consists of three component parts, the second of which is taken over literally from the eighth bar of the first theme. The third portion, derived as a transformation of a rhythmic cell from the first theme's fourth bar, becomes the main idea of this second theme group. The exposition concludes with a rather anonymous, short transitional idea in dotted rhythms, which will never recur. After an exposition lasting some 79 bars, the following development section is extraordinarily brief at only 18 bars—a sort of "mini development" based entirely on the second and third motifs of the second theme.

The recapitulation then begins forcefully with three statements of the first theme in the tonic key of D major. The third statement introduces a rhythmic variant in triplets, followed by an unexpected modulation via the transitional key of B♭ major into the distant key of E♭ major where the unison horns launch a "heroic appeal" which is then repeated a major third higher and, finally back in the home key of D major. At this point, the appearance is that of a developmental episode (about the same length as the "mini development") interrupting the recapitulation, but after the apparent return to the business of recapitulation, Enescu then begins the true development, lasting about fifty-five bars and involving both of the main themes in the most complex counterpoint of the entire Decet, thereby shifting the moment of maximum dramatic interest to near the end of the composition. The coda following rehearsal number 41 includes a remarkable series of nineteen fourths ascending in several waves played in unison or octaves in various instrumental combinations. These bear a striking resemblance to the main theme of Arnold Schoenberg's First Chamber Symphony, composed in the same year but not performed until 8 February 1907.

== Discography ==
Chronologically by date of recording:

- Enesco: Dixtuor; Kodály: Sonata for Cello and Piano. Wind Instrument Soloists of the Orchestre National de la Radiodiffusion Française, George Enescu, conductor; Richard Matuschla, cello, Otto Schulhof, piano. Recorded in Europe, 1951. LP recording, 1 disc: 12 in, 33⅓ rpm, monaural. Remington R-199-107. New York: Remington Records, 1952. Decet reissued, coupled with Enescu’s Romanian Rhapsodies Nos. 1 & 2, LP recording, 1 disc: 12 in, 33⅓ rpm, monaural. Varèse Sarabande VC 81042, 1978. [Decet reissued as part of a 2-CD set, Romanian Radio, 2005.]
- Dixtuor pentru suflători în re major, op. 14; Simfonia de cameră: pentru 12 instrumente soliste, op. 33. Nicolae Alexandru, Mihai Teodorescu, flutes; Constantin Iliuta, oboe; Pavel Tornea, cor anglais; Constantin Ungureanu, Constantin Cernaianu, clarinets; Emil Biclea, Gheorghe Popa, bassoons; Ion Badanoiu, Paul Staicu, horns; Constantin Silvestri, conductor. Recorded 17 September 1958. LP recording, 1 disc: 10 in., 33⅓ rpm, monaural. Electrecord ECD 14. Later reissued, coupled with the Chamber Symphony, LP recording, 1 disc: 12 in, 33⅓ rpm, monaural. Electrecord STM-ECE 01046, [1980]. Reissued as, Georges Enesco: Sinfonia da Camera, Op. 33, pour douze instruments; Dixtuor en Ré Majeur, Op. 14, pour instruments à vent. LP recording, 1 disc: 12 in, 33⅓ rpm, monaural. La Voix de Son Maître (EMI) FALP 508. Paris: Industries Musicales et Électriques Pathé-Marconi, [?19-]. Reissued on CD, Electrecord EDC 800. Bucharest: Electrecord, 2007. The Decet performance also reissued on CD in a different coupling, with Enescu's Octet for Strings, in "reconditioned recordings", on Electrecord ELDC 122. Bucharest: Casa de discursive Electrecord, [1991].
- George Enescu: Dixtuor pentru suflători, op. 14; Intermezzo [sic] pentru instrumente de coarde, op. 12. Members of the Orchestre philharmonique Iași Moldova (Corneliu Vieru, Teofil Viotar, flûtes; Nicolai Tudor, hautbois; Aurel Oroșanu, cor anglais; Ludovic Wagner, Aurel Negoescu, clarinets; Bucur Chirilă, Constantin Petrea, cors; Gavril Varga, Mihai Vârgă, bassons); Ion Baciu, conductor. LP recording, 1 disc: 12 in, 33⅓ rpm, stereo. Electrecord ST-ECE 01751. Bucharest: Casa discuri Electrecord, [1970]. Decet reissued, newly coupled with Enescu: Octet in C major for Strings, performed by the String quartets Voces & Euterpe (Iași) CD recording, 1 disc: digital, 4¾ in., stereo. Marco Polo 8.223147. [S.l.]: Pacific Music Co. Ltd., [1988].
- George Enescu: Symphonie de chambre op. 33; Deux intermèdes pour cordes op. 12; Dixtuor pour instruments à vent op. 14. Soloists of the Orchestre de Chambre de Lausanne, Lawrence Foster, conductor. Recorded Salle communale d'Épalinges, 8–10 December 1987. CD recording, 1 disc: digital, 4¾ in., stereo. Claves CD 50-8803. Thun: Production Claves, 1988.
- George Enescu: Octet for Strings in C Major, Op. 7; Decet for Winds in D Major, Op. 14. Orchestra de cameră "Virtuozii din Bucarești" (in the Decet: Virgil Frâncu and Nicolae Maxim, flutes; Adrian Petrescu, oboe; Florin Ionoaia, cor anglais; Valeriu Bărbuceanu and Leontin Boanță, clarinets; Gödri Orban, and Viorica Feher, bassoons; Simon Jebeleanu and Dan Cinca, horns) Horia Andreescu, conductor. Recorded in Tomis Studio, Bucharest, March 1995. CD recording, 1 disc: digital, 4¾ in., stereo. Electrecord EDC 277. Bucharest: Casa de discuri Electrecord, 1995. Also issued on CD as Olympia OCD 445. Olympia Explorer Series. London: Olympia Compact Discs Ltd, 1995.
- Dvořák: Serenade for Wind; Enescu: Dixtuor; Janáček: Mládi. Oslo Philharmonic Wind Soloists. Recorded at Ris Kirke, Oslo, Norway (Dvořák, Enescu) and Sojenberg Kirke, Oslo, Norway (Janáček), 4–6 November 1996. CD recording, 1 disc: digital, 4¾ in., stereo. Naxos 8.554 173. [S.l.]: HNH International, Ltd., 2000.
- George Enescu: Octour in C major, op. 7; Dixtour in D major, op. 14. Members of the Orchestre Philharmonique "George Enescu", Cristian Mandeal, conductor. Recorded at the Romanian Athenaeum Hall, Bucharest, 24–28 February 1997. CD recording, 1 disc: digital, 4¾ in., stereo. Arte Nova 74321 63634 2. Germany: Arte Nova Classics, 1999.
- George Enescu: Octuor for Strings, Op. 7; Dixtuor for Winds, Op. 14. Viotta Ensemble, Micha Hamel, conductor. Recorded Maria Minor, Utrecht, 2 October 1999 (Octet), 10 February 2001 (Decet). CD recording, 1 disc: digital, 4¾ in., stereo. Ottavo OTR C20179. The Hague: Ottavo Recordings, 2001.
- WASBE 2007 Killarney, Ireland: University of Cincinnati CCM Chamber Players (Enescu: Decet; works by Franz Krommer, Arthur Bird, and Pyotr Tchaikovsky). University of Cincinnati College-Conservatory of Music Chamber Players, Rodney Winther, conductor. Recorded at an unknown venue, Killarney, Ireland, Sunday 8 July 2007. CD recording, 1 disc: digital, 4¾ in., stereo. Mark Records 7212. Clarence, NY: Mark Records, 2007.
- Trois sélections pour Chamber Winds (Enescu: Decet; Ruth Gipps: Seascape, Op. 53; Wind Sinfonietta, Op. 73). Erie County Chamber Winds, Rick Fleming, conductor. Recorded at Ciminelli Hall, Buffalo State College, 10 and 13 June 2013. CD recording, 1 disc: digital, 4¾ in., stereo. Mark Records 50790. Clarence, NY: Mark Records, 2014.
