= Octet (Enescu) =

4-movement work for string octet by George Enescu

- Chamber music by George Enescu
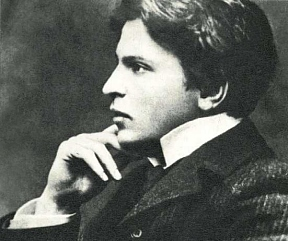
- George Enescu in the 1910s
- Key: C major
- Opus: 7
- Composed: 1900
- Dedication: André Gedalge
- Performed: 18 December 1909 Paris
- Duration: 40 min.
- Movements: 4
- Scoring: 4 violins; 2 violas; 2 cellos

The Octet for strings in C major, Op. 7, is an octet composition for string instruments by the Romanian composer George Enescu, completed in 1900. Together with the Octet in F major, Op. 17 (1849) by Niels Gade, it is regarded as amongst the most notable successors to Felix Mendelssohn's celebrated Octet, Op. 20.

== History ==
Following the completion of his Second Violin Sonata in 1899, composition of the Octet occupied Enescu for a year and a half. The complexity of a structure spanning 40 minutes in performance caused him considerable difficulty, though he found the challenge exciting. "I wore myself out trying to make work a piece of music divided into four segments of such length that each of them was likely at any moment to break. An engineer launching his first suspension bridge over a river, could not feel more anxiety than I felt when I set out to darken my paper".

Once he had completed the Octet, Enescu offered it to Édouard Colonne for performance in his Concerts Colonne. However, after five rehearsals the impresario removed it from the program on grounds that it was too risky, a decision that Enescu regarded bitterly. The belated premiere finally took place on 18 December 1909 in the Salle des Agriculteurs in Paris, as part of a festival concert of Enescu's chamber works in the Soirées d'Art concert series. The performers were the combined members of the Géloso and Chailley Quartets, conducted by the composer. Enescu's Piano Quartet No. 1 in D major, Op. 16, completed only a few days earlier, also received its premiere on this concert, which also included a performance of his Sept chansons de Clément Marot, for tenor and piano, Op. 15, composed the previous year.

The Octet is dedicated to André Gedalge, one of Enescu's professors at the Conservatory, whose support in convincing the firm of Enoch & Cie to publish the score was deeply appreciated by the composer.

The conductor Karl Krueger reported that, when he asked the composer how he felt about having the work played by a larger body of string players, Enescu enthusiastically replied, "That's how it should be!" When Enoch reprinted the score in 1950, Enescu added a new preface in which he endorsed this option, but with some qualifications:

This work can be played with a full string orchestra on condition that certain singing parts [passages chantants] be entrusted to soloists. I leave it to the judicious choice of the conductor to decide which passages are to be played solo.

== Analysis ==
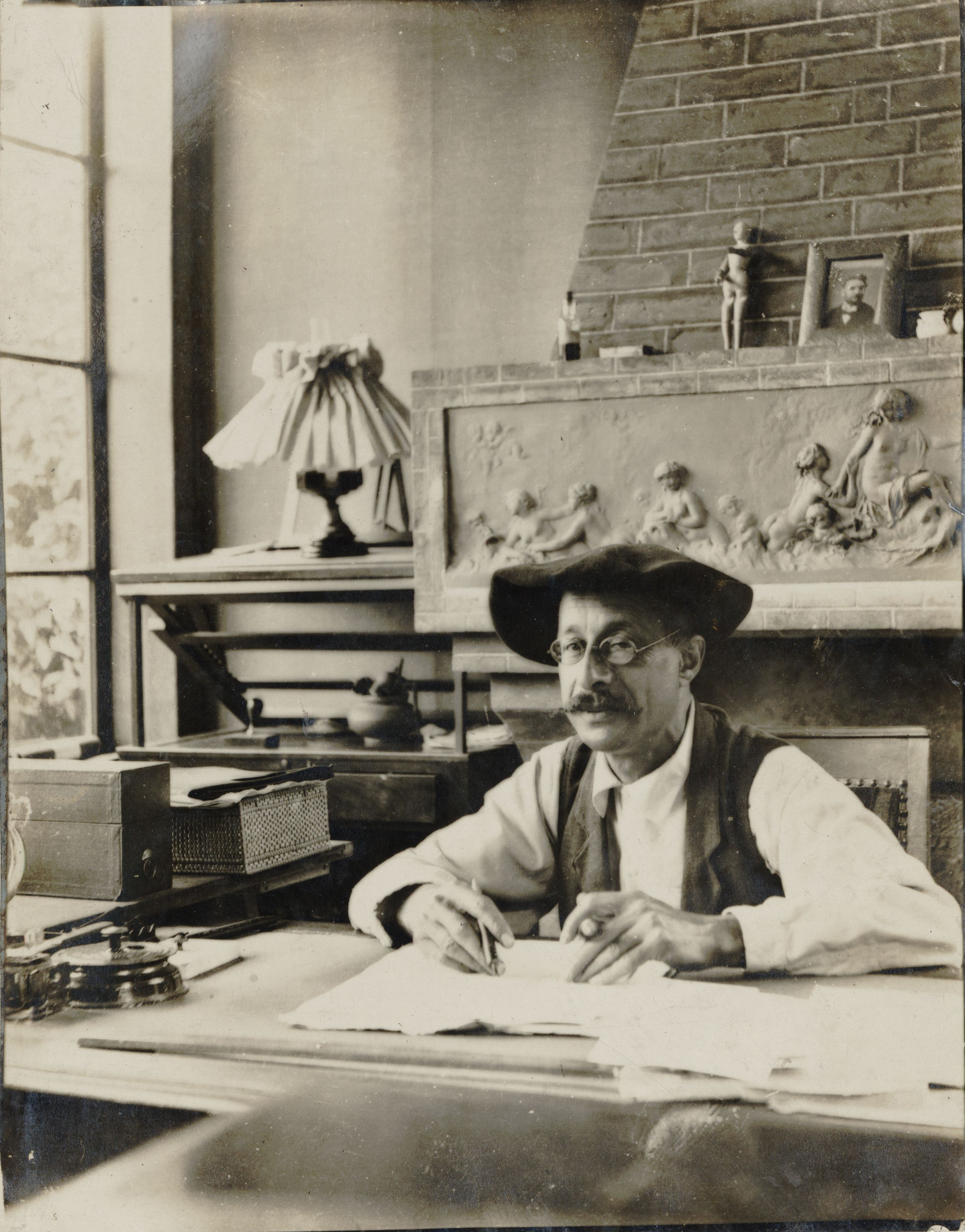
André Gedalge, dedicatee of the Octet, c. 1908

Enescu's composition stands in contrast to Felix Mendelssohn's Octet, which sets a soloistic violin part against an accompaniment of the other stringed instruments. Enescu's work on the other hand is "a genuine octet that finds its most natural expression just in its hallucinatory convergent and divergent contrapuntal voices". Stylistically, the Octet stands outside the categories into which most of Enescu's works from before the end of the First World War fall, when he was still working his way through a wide range of styles and influences, including those of César Franck, Ernest Chausson, Henri Duparc, Claude Debussy, and Richard Strauss.

The form is described by the composer as cyclic, and divided into four movements:

1. Très modéré (3/2)
2. Très fougueux (E major)
3. Lentement
4. Mouvement de valse bien rythmée

A typical performance of the work takes around 40 minutes.

However, these four sections are linked together to form a single large sonata-allegro form movement. The first movement functions as the exposition and the finale as recapitulation, while development is pursued in the inner two movements. The idea of cyclically integrating all of the movements of a symphony into a single overarching form can be traced back to Beethoven's Fifth Symphony, and was developed further by Hector Berlioz, Robert Schumann, and Franz Liszt. The most likely model for Enescu's organization of the Octet is Liszt's Piano Concerto in E-flat major (1855) which, even more than that composer's B-minor Sonata, pursues the outline of a sonata form throughout its four movements.

There are between nine and as many as twelve melodic themes used in the work, depending on the analysis The greatest number of them (six or seven) are presented in the exposition of the first part. The second part is a kind of demonic scherzo, tumultuous and whirling, while the third is a lyrical slow movement; in both of them new themes are added

== Discography ==
- George Enescu: Octet for Strings in C Major, Op. 7 (version for string orchestra). American Arts Orchestra; Karl Krueger, cond. LP recording, 1 disc: analog, monaural, 12 in. New Records NELP 101 (on label: NRMG 101). [N.p.]: New Records, Inc., [1950].
- George Enescu: Octet for Strings in C Major, Op. 7. String octet of members of the Uniunea Compozitorilor din Republica Socialista România and the Filarmonica de Stat "Georges Enesco"; Constantin Silvestri, cond. LP recording 1 audio disc: analog, 33⅓ rpm, monaural, 12 in. Electrecord ECE 01. Bucharest: Casa de discuri Electrecord, [1950s]; Artia ALP 119. [Prague]: Artia, [n.d.]. Reissued in a coupling with the Decet for Winds in D Major, Op. 14 (from Electrecord stereo LP STM-ECE 01046), as a "reconditioned recording". CD recording, 1 disc: digital, monaural & stereo, 12 cm. Olympia OCD 445. Electrecord ELCD 122. Bucharest: Casa de discuri Electrecord, 1992.
- George Enescu: Octet for Strings in C Major, Op. 7. "Voces" String Quartet of Iasi; Iasi String Quartet. Ion Baciu, cond. LP recording 1 audio disc: analog, 33⅓ rpm, stereo, 12 in. Electrecord ST-ECE 01856. Bucharest: Electrecord, 1977. Reissued, coupled with the Decet for winds in D, Op. 14, performed by the Winds of the Iasi Moldova Philharmonic. LP recording 1 audio disc: analog, 33⅓ rpm, stereo, 12 in. Electrecord ST-ECE 61856. Bucharest: Electrecord, [before 1987]. Reissued on CD, 1 audio disc: stereo, 12 cm. Marco Polo 8.223147. [n.p.]: Pacific Music, 1988.
- George Enescu: Octet for Strings in C Major, Op. 7; Richard Strauss: Sextet from Capriccio, Op. 85; Dmitri Shostakovich: Two Pieces for String Octet, Op. 11. Academy of St Martin-in-the-Fields Chamber Ensemble. CD recording, 1 disc: digital, stereo, 12 cm. Chandos CHAN 9131. Colchester: Chandos Records Ltd, 1993.
- George Enescu: Octet for Strings in C Major, Op. 7; Felix Mendelssohn: Octet in E-flat Major, Op. 20. Le Quatuor Alcan; Le Quatuor Québec. CD recording, 1 disc: digital, stereo, 12 cm. CBC Records MVCD 1063. Toronto: Société Radio-Canada / Canadian Broadcasting Corporation, 1993.
- George Enescu: Octet for Strings in C Major, Op. 7; Decet for Winds in D Major, Op. 14. René Ceistian Popescu, Liviu Morna, Nioara Moroianu, and Adriana Winkler, violins; Gabriel Bălă and Florin Matei, violas; Marin Cazacu and Dan Joiţoiu, cellos; Horia Andreescu, cond. Recorded by Electrecord in Tomis Studio, Bucharest, March 1995. Issued under licence. CD recording, 1 disc: digital, stereo, 12 cm. Olympia OCD 445. Olympia Explorer Series. London: Olympia Compact Discs Ltd, 1995.
- Felix Mendelssohn-Bartholdy: Octet in E-flat major, Op. 20; George Enescu: Octet in C major, Op. 7. Christian Bor, Ida Levin, Nicholas Kitchen, Lynn Chang, violins; Marcus Thompson, Hsin-Yun Huang, violas; Ronald Thomas, Yeesun Kim, cellos. Recorded at Methuen Memorial Music Hall, Methuen, MA, January, 1998. CD recording, 1 disc: digital, stereo, 12 cm. Boston Chamber Music Society BCMR 05-CD. [Mass.]: Boston Chamber Music Society, 1998.
- George Enescu: Octet in C major, Op. 7; Decet in D major, Op. 14. Ensembles of "George Enescu" Bucharest Philharmonic Orchestra; Cristian Mandeal, cond. CD recording, 1 disc: digital, stereo, 12 cm. Arta Nova Classics 74321 63634 2. [Germany]: Arte Nova Classics, 1999.
- George Enescu: Octet for Strings in C Major, Op. 7; Decet for Winds in D Major, Op. 14. Viotta Ensemble; Micha Hamel, cond (Op. 14 only). Recorded at Maria Minor, Utrecht, 2 October 1999 (Octet) and 10 February 2001 (Decet). CD recording, 1 disc: digital, stereo, 12-cm. Ottavo OTR C20179. The Hague: Ottavo Recordings, 2001.
- George Enescu: Octet for Strings in C Major, Op. 7 (version for string orchestra); Quintet for Piano and Strings, Op.29. Kremerata Baltica; Gidon Kremer, cond. Octet recorded at Angelika-Kauffmann-Saal, Schwarzenberg, Austria, June 2000. Quintet recorded at Probesaal der Philharmonie Rheinland-Pfalz, Luswigshafen, Germany, November 2001. CD recording, 1 disc: digital, stereo, 12 cm. Nonesuch Records 79682-2. [N.p.]: Nonesuch Records, 2002.
- George Enescu; Felix Mendelssohn-Bartholdy: Octets for Strings. Christian Tetzlaff, Isabelle Faust, Antje Weithaas, Lisa Batiashvili (Enescu), Katherine Gowers (Mendelssohn), violins; Rachel Roberts, Ori Kam (Enescu), Antoine Tamestit (Mendelssohn), violas; Quirine Viersen, Tanja Tetzlaff (Enescu), Gustav Rivinius (Mendelssohn), cellos. Recorded live at the Hydroelectric Power Station, Heimbach, Germany, during the Spannungen chamber music festival, 11 June (Enescu) and 12 June (Mendelssohn), 2008. CD recording, 1 audio disc: digital, stereo, 12 cm. Avi-Music 42 6008553163 9 (on container: 8553163). Cologne: Avi-Music, 2009.
- George Enescu: Octet for Strings in C Major, Op. 7, arranged for orchestra by Lawrence Foster. Orchestre Philharmonique de Monte-Carlo; Lawrence Foster. With Enescu: Violin Sonata No. 3. Valeri Sokolow, violin; Swetlana Kosenko, piano. CD recording, 1 disc: digital, stereo, 12 cm. Virgin Classics 50999 519312 2 3. Classics 50999 519312 2 3. [England]: Virgin Classics, 2009.
- George Enescu: Octet for Strings in C major, Op. 7. Vilde Frang, Erik Schumann, Gabriel Le Magadure, Rosanne Philippens, violins; Lawrence Power, Lily Francis, violas; Nicolas Altstaedt, Jan-Erik Gustafsson, cellos. Recorded at Schloss Elmau, Germany, October 2017. With Bela Bartok: Violin Concerto No 1 Sz.. 36, BB 48a. Vilde Frang, violin; Mikko Franck, conductor; Orchestre Philharmonique de Radio France. Recorded at Auditorium de Radio France, Paris, September 2017. Warner Classics, 2018.
- Octets: Mendelssohn & Enescu. George Enescu: Octet for Strings in C Major, Op. 7; Felix Mendelssohn: Octet in E-flat Major, Op. 20. Quatuor Ébène, Belcea Quartet. Recorded at Schloss Elmau, Germany, 6-11 July 2025. CD recording. Erato 5021732997296.
