= Symphony No. 3 (Enescu) =

Musical work composed by George Enescu

- Orchestral-vocal music by George Enescu
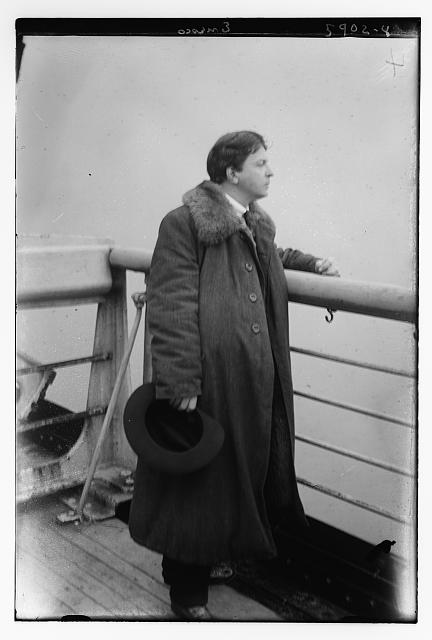
- George Enesco in 1922
- Key: C major
- Opus: 21
- Composed: 1916–18, revised later
- Performed: 25 May 1919 Athenaeum, Bucharest
- Movements: 3
- Scoring: (wordless) choir; orchestra

The Symphony No. 3, Op. 21, in C major is a large-scale orchestral-vocal composition by the Romanian composer George Enescu. While it was first written in 1916–18. the composer revised it numerous times over the following decades.

== History ==
Enescu began writing the Third Symphony at Sinaia in May 1916, not long before Romania entered the First World War. During the withdrawal of Romania to the province of Moldavia in face of the invading forces of the Central Powers, he finished the first movement in 1917 at Iași. The second movement was completed at the height of the conflict, in January 1918, also at Iași, and the third was finished on 20 August of the same year at Dorohoi.

The premiere date is disputed. According to one authority the Symphony was first performed in 1918 and then again at least once in the same year. According to others, however, the first performance did not take place until 25 May 1919 at the Athenaeum in Bucharest, with the Orchestra of the Ministry of Education and the Carmen Choral Society, conducted by the composer, prefaced by J. S. Bach's Brandenburg Concerto No. 4.

Although the symphony was an immediate success, Enescu was not satisfied with it and undertook a revision in 1920. The new version was premiered in Paris at the end of February 1921, conducted by Gabriel Pierné, but Enescu still was not satisfied and continued to revise the score for more than thirty years. The latest revision is dated 12 June 1951. It was not published until 1965, by the Editura muzicală a uniunii compozitorilor din Republica socialistă românia in Bucharest.

== Instrumentation ==
The symphony is scored for 4 flutes (3rd and 4th doubling 1st and 2nd piccolo), 4 oboes (3rd and 4th doubling 1st and 2nd cor anglais), 3 clarinets (3rd doubling E♭ clarinet and bass clarinet), 4 bassoons (4th doubling contrabassoon), 6 horns, piccolo trumpet in D, 3 trumpets in C, 2 cornets in B♭, valve trombone, 3 tenor trombones, bass trombone, 3 tubas, 2 sets of timpani, 6 percussionists (snare drum, tambourine, triangle, ratchet, hand bell, cymbals, tam-tam, bass drum, castanets, xylophone, bell (F♯), thunder sheet, glockenspiel), celesta, piano, organ, wordless chorus, 2 harps, 20 first violins, 20 second violins, 14 violas, 12 cellos and 12 double basses.

== Analysis ==
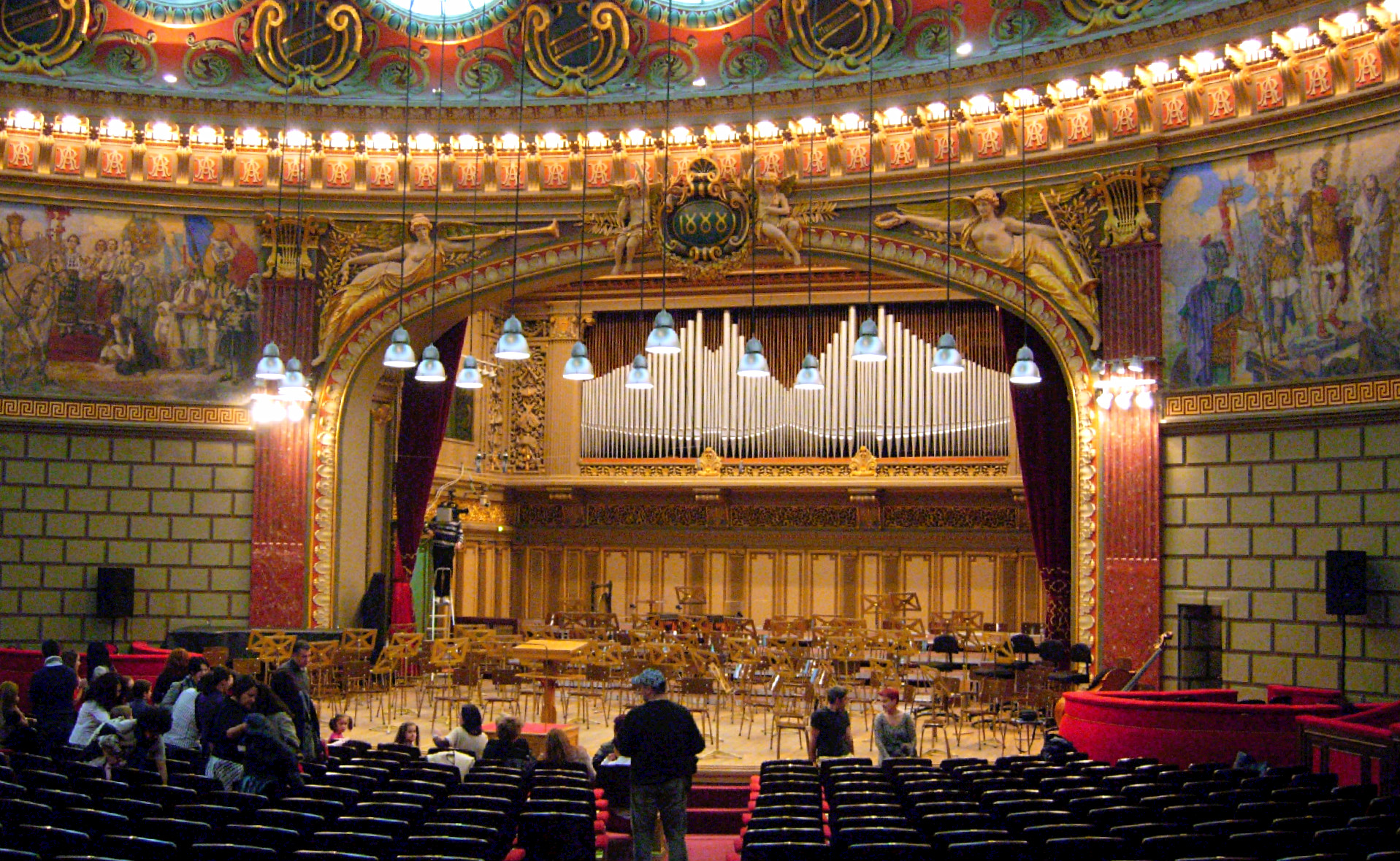
Stage of the Athenaeum, Bucharest

The symphony is in three movements:

1. Moderato, un poco maestoso
2. Vivace ma non troppo
3. Lento ma non troppo

Enescu employs the same thematic material throughout the symphony, cyclically, but develops it in different ways. The first movement alternates brooding, questioning, heroic, and lyrical moods; the second movement is a darkly sinister scherzo, relieved briefly by a bright march episode; the finale is solemn and serene, introducing a wordless choir. It ends in "a sort of quiet ecstasy" with the lightest of orchestral textures and employs at one point a small bell which, according to the score, "should have the same sort of sonority as the bells which are used in Catholic churches at the Elevation of the Host". The strongly contrasted characters of the three movements—and especially the paradisal serenity of the finale—have tempted some critics, beginning with Pierre Lalo in 1921, to interpret the symphony programmatically as a "Dantesque trilogy" of Purgatory (alternatively, Earth), Inferno, and Paradise

== Discography ==
- George Enescu: Symphony No. 3; Chamber Symphony for 12 Solo Instruments, Op. 33. Cluj-Napoca Philharmonic Orchestra and Chorus (Florentin Mihaescu, chorus master), Ion Baciu, cond. CD recording, 1 disc: digital, 12 cm, stereo. Marco Polo 8.223143. [Germany]: HNH International, 1988.
- George Enescu: Complete Orchestral Works, Vol. 3. Symphony No. 3 in C Major, Op. 21; Romanian Poem, Op. 1. Romanian National Radio Orchestra and Choir, Horia Andreescu, cond. (Aurel Grigoras, chorus master). Recorded at the Radio Concert Hall. Bucharest, July 1993. Olympia Explorer Series. Olympia Recordings, 1994.
- George Enescu: Orchestral Works, Vol. 2. Symphony No. 3 in C Major, Op. 21; Romanian Rhapsody No. 2 in D Major, Op. 11, No. 2. Philharmonia Moldova and the Gavril Musicescu Choir, Alexandru Lascae, cond. Recorded at the Concerthall of the Philharmonic Orchestra of Moldavia, Iaşi (Romania), 8–12 April 1992 (Rhapsody); 5–7 May 1993 (Symphony). CD recording, 1 disc: digital, 12 cm, stereo. Ottavo OTR C59344. The Hague, The Netherlands: Ottavo Recordings, 1994.
- George Enescu, Compozitor: Simfonia a III-a; Poemul "Isis", Simfonia a IV-a; Simfonia a V-a. Înregistrări din Arhiva Radio România. Orchestra Naţională Radio; Corul Academic Radio; Horia Andreescu, cond. (Third Symphony, recorded at the studios of the Romanian Radio, 1994); Camil Marinescu, cond. (Isis, recorded at the studios of Romanian Radio, Bucharest, 1998); Corneliu Dumbrăveanu, cond. (Fourth Symphony, recorded at the studios of Romanian Radio, Bucharest, 1998); Florin Diaconescu, tenor; Orchestra Naţională Radio, Corul de femei Radio (Aurel Grigoraş, choir master); Horia Andreescu, cond. (Fifth Symphony, recorded at the studios of Romanian Radio, Bucharest, 1996). CD recording, 2 discs: analogue, 12 cm, stereo. Casa Radio 433 ECR. Bucharest: Radio România, 2017.
- George Enescu. Symphony No. 3 in C Major, Op. 21; Concert Overture in A Major, Op. 32. Bucharest Philharmonic Orchestra; Cristian Mandeal, cond. Recorded 25–28 September 1995 at the Romanian Athenaeum Hall, Bucharest. CD recording, 1 disc: digital, 12 cm, stereo. Arte Nova Classics 74321 37863 2. [Germany]: Arte Nova Classics, 1996.
- Enescu: Symphony No. 3; Romanian Rhapsody No. 1. BBC Philharmonic Orchestra, Leeds Festival Chorus (Simon Wright, chorus master), Gennady Rozhdestvensky, cond. Symphony recorded 1–2 October 1997, Rhapsody 12–13 June 1996, both at New Broadcasting House, Manchester. Colchester: Chandos Records, 1998.
- George Enescu: Three Symphonies; Violin Sonata No. 3. Chœur de Chambre Les Éléments; Orchestre National de Lyon, Lawrence Foster, cond. Valeriy Sokolov, violin; Svetlana Kosenko, piano. CD recording, 2 discs: digital, 12 cm, stereo. Warner Classics 50999 6 78393 2 2. [UK]: Warner Music UK Ltd, 2012.
- George Enescu: Ouverture de Concert sur des thèmes dans le caractère populaire roumain, Op. 32; Symphony No. 3, Op. 21. Tampere Philharmonic Orchestra; Tampere Philharmonic Choir (Timo Nuoranne, chorus master), Hannu Lintu, cond. Recorded at Tampere Hall, 25 August 2011 (Ouverture); 24–26 April 2013 (Symphony No. 3). CD recording, 1 disc: digital, 12 cm, stereo. Ondine ODE 1197-2. Helsinki: Ondine Oy, 2013.
