= Concerto pathétique =

1866 composition by Franz Liszt

The Concerto pathétique (S.258/2), completed in 1866, is Franz Liszt's most substantial and ambitious two-piano work. At least three piano concerto arrangements of the work have been made by other composers, based on Liszt's suggestions.

== History and significance ==
In 1851 Breitkopf & Härtel published the solo piano work Grosses Concert-Solo (in modern editions as Grosses Konzertsolo) (S.176) by Franz Liszt. Though not as popular as the later Piano Sonata in B minor by the same composer, the work achieves significance by the fact that it anticipates the Sonata as a large-scale non-programmatic work. It shows structural similarities to the Sonata and obvious thematic relationship to both the Sonata and the Faust Symphony.

One unpublished earlier version of the work exists, titled in French in the manuscript Grand Solo de concert (S.175a). This version differs structurally from the published Grosses Concert-Solo, thus revealing the existence of interesting material for a study on the genesis of Liszt's gradual innovations in constructing a large-scale musical organism, which were to come to full fruition in the Sonata.

In 1866 a two-piano version was published under the title Concerto pathétique (S.258/2) which, though not differing structurally from the Grosses Concert-Solo, introduces a more effective layout of the musical thoughts, mainly due to an innovative concerto-like treatment of the two-piano ensemble. The initial conception of a projected piano concerto can further be proved by a number of extant piano concerto arrangements by various composers, including orchestra sketches by Liszt himself (the unpublished manuscript containing the piece's original (French) title Grand solo de concert) (S.365).

While the solo piano version is rarely performed today, the Concerto pathétique has become a repertoire piece of the two-piano genre.

In 1885, Liszt thanked Eduard Reuss for a new arrangement of the Concerto.

== Genesis of the "four-movements-in-one" form ==
The experimental nature of the Concerto pathétique gives it an outstanding presence in the Liszt oeuvre. The composer made many attempts to find an appropriate title – Grand solo de concert, Grand Concert, Morceau de Concert, etc. – indicating that this work was an experiment with new forms. Even the Piano Concerto No. 2 in A major which Liszt begun work on in the same year (1849) as the Grand Solo de concert/Grosses Concert-Solo had its genesis ten years earlier in a seemingly self-contradictory entitled work Concerto sans orchestre (S.524a). The fact that the solo Grosses Concert-Solo has been overshadowed by the later two-piano version has obscured the importance of the former as one of Liszt's largest and most ambitious original works for the instrument. The Grosses Concert-Solo anticipates several of the most salient features of Liszt's undisputed masterwork, the Piano Sonata in B minor, namely the non-programmatic "four-movements-in-one" form.

The earlier unpublished solo version (S.175a) as well as the unpublished orchestra accompaniment sketches for a projected piano concerto version (S.365) do not contain the slow Andante sostenuto middle section, which shows that Liszt's initial conception was one virtuoso sonata-allegro movement with exposition, development, recapitulation, and coda. The new "comprehensive" sonata form is the result of an insertion of a slow movement (sometimes compared to the Lento sostenuto of Chopin's Fantasy in F minor) between exposition and development and a cyclic recurrence of the slow movement theme between recapitulation and coda in order to achieve unity. Since this afterthought of Liszt does not quite agree with the initial intentions, the result is a somewhat loose rhapsodic structure with interlinked sections held together by a few insertions.

Liszt did not smooth out those "rough edges". He simply used some of the thematic material to compose an entirely new work in similar large-scale form – the Sonata in B minor. Here the form convinces because the thematic ideas have been contrived to match each other, which makes the thematic transformation, already apparent in the Grosses Concert-Solo and many earlier works, more natural. In contrast to the Grosses Concert-Solo, the accompaniment figurations in the sonata are permeated by thematic allusions resulting in a more logically compelling development of ideas.

It is typical for Liszt that he did not destroy the earlier solo work (Grosses Concert-Solo) but rearranged it in the two-piano version Concerto pathétique. Since Liszt had projected a piano concerto version but dropped the plan, the two-piano arrangement can be seen as a sort of compromise. In this version Liszt seems to have been more interested in the concerto-like effects of the two-piano ensemble than in structural innovations, because he left the overall design of the solo version unaltered. The suggestion of a concerto version can be detected in various remarks such as quasi arpa, quasi timpani, etc., and the fact that the first piano part is more virtuosic throughout. Later concerto arrangers, like Eduard Reuss (1885, corrected by Liszt (S.365a)), Richard Burmeister (1898) or Gábor Darvas (1952), have usually incorporated the second piano part into the orchestra part.

Despite the structural relationship between the Concerto pathétique and the Sonata, Liszt always rejected the idea of a preconceived form. In his Faust Symphony, which employs related thematic material, he does not attempt to write another "four-movement-in-one" work.

== Concert piece or concerto? ==
The word concert(o), except for its spelling, is the only consistent part of the various titles of the Concerto pathétique, though its meaning is open to interpretation. The German word Concert (modern spelling Konzert) could mean both concert and concerto, but the titles Grosses Concert-Solo or Grand solo de concert seem just to denote a large-scale concert piece (as opposed to a short salon piece for example), whereas Concerto pathétique calls to mind a concerto. The prefix Concert (Konzert) or the French de concert could also mean a concerto-like and/or one-movement work for solo and orchestra (such as Schumann's Konzertstück and Konzert-Allegro, Chopin's Allegro de concert, or Weber's Konzertstück, one of Liszt's "war horses"). Such a Konzertstück (concertino) form seems to be indicated by the title Morceau de concert [sic] (pour piano sans orchestre).

The existence of sketches (in Liszt's hand) for a piano concerto version of the Grosses Concert-Solo give evidence to the concerto character of the solo version. Liszt was not the only composer to have written a "concerto without orchestra".

The term concerto might also point to certain formal procedures. Liszt's later addition of the Andante sostenuto part to the solo version results in sectional tempo (and mood) changes somewhat related to a baroque concerto. Another heritage from the baroque age is the idea of competing forces (solo against orchestra for example). The two-piano medium is excellently suited for projecting this concert style (also recognized by Stravinsky's Concerto per due pianoforti soli or Busoni's Duettino concertante). In a solo piece the idea of struggling forces would be expressed by different moods (registers, modes, keys, dynamics, tempos, etc.) pitted against each other (the opposing characters in Faust). It cannot be doubted that there exists more than just a technical connotation of the term concerto for Liszt's unlimited imagination.

The adjective grand could mean large-scale and/or indicate a certain grandeur of character, expression, or style. It is commonly used by Romantic composers (Chopin's Grande polonaise brillante). But the German groß does not have that connotation in Grosses Concert-Solo.
