= Symphony No. 2 (Villa-Lobos) =

- Ascensão
- by Heitor Villa-Lobos
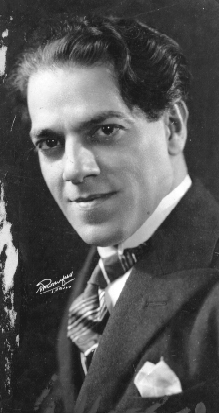
- Heitor Villa-Lobos
- English: Ascension
- Catalogue: W132
- Opus: 160
- Composed: 1917 – 1944: Rio de Janeiro
- Published: 1978: New York
- Publisher: Belwin Mills
- Recorded: 26 November 1944: Los Angeles, Werner Janssen Symphony Orchestra, conducted by Villa-Lobos
- Duration: 50 mins
- Movements: Four

Premiere
- Date: 6 May 1944
- Location: Rio de Janeiro
- Conductor: Heitor Villa-Lobos
- Performers: Orquestra Sinfônica da Rádio Nacional

Symphony No. 2, subtitled Ascensão (Ascension), is a composition by the Brazilian composer Heitor Villa-Lobos. Villa-Lobos composed (or began composing) his Second Symphony in Rio de Janeiro in 1917, but the piece was not completed until late in 1943 or early in 1944.

It was first performed on 6 May 1944 in a radio broadcast by the Orquestra Sinfônica da Rádio Nacional, conducted by the composer. The first North American performance took place a little more than six months later, on 26 November 1944 in Philharmonic Auditorium, Los Angeles, by the Janssen Symphony of Los Angeles, conducted by Villa-Lobos. It is the second in a cycle of five symphonies written in the style of Vincent d'Indy.

The symphony takes approximately 50 minutes to perform. This makes it the second-longest of Villa-Lobos' symphonies, after No. 10.

== Instrumentation ==
The symphony is scored for an orchestra consisting of 2 piccolos, 2 flutes, 2 oboes, cor anglais, 2 clarinets, bass clarinet, 2 bassoons, contrabassoon, 4 horns, 4 trumpets, 4 trombones, tuba, percussion (timpani, tam-tam, bass drum, cymbals, side drum, and tambour de basque), celesta, 2 harps, and strings.

== Analysis ==
The symphony is in four movements:

1. Allegro non troppo
2. Allegretto scherzando
3. Andante moderato
4. Allegro

The principal, first theme of the opening movement returns in all of the subsequent movements as a cyclic theme. It appears twice in the development section of the second movement (b. 93 and 168, both times in the low strings), at the beginning of the development in the third movement (b. 32) in the low woodwinds, and in the fourth movement in the development or episodic section, first in the bass clarinet, then with the addition of the bassoons and contrabassoon.

The third, slow movement is a monothematic sonata-allegro form, with a shift from B minor to D major marking both the exposition and the course of the work as a whole.

The finale is cast in sonata-allegro form, though with unconventional tonal relationships. The two main themes have tonics separated by a tritone, E and B♭ in the exposition, transposed upward by a minor third in the recapitulation to G and D♭. The tonal plan therefore projects a diminished seventh chord, with an upward progression of a semitone at the end to conclude the Allegro on D. Thematically, the movement contains not only its own themes and the main cyclic theme of the symphony, but also recalls motivic material from themes in all the preceding movements.
