= Luise Reuss-Belce =

Austrian opera singer

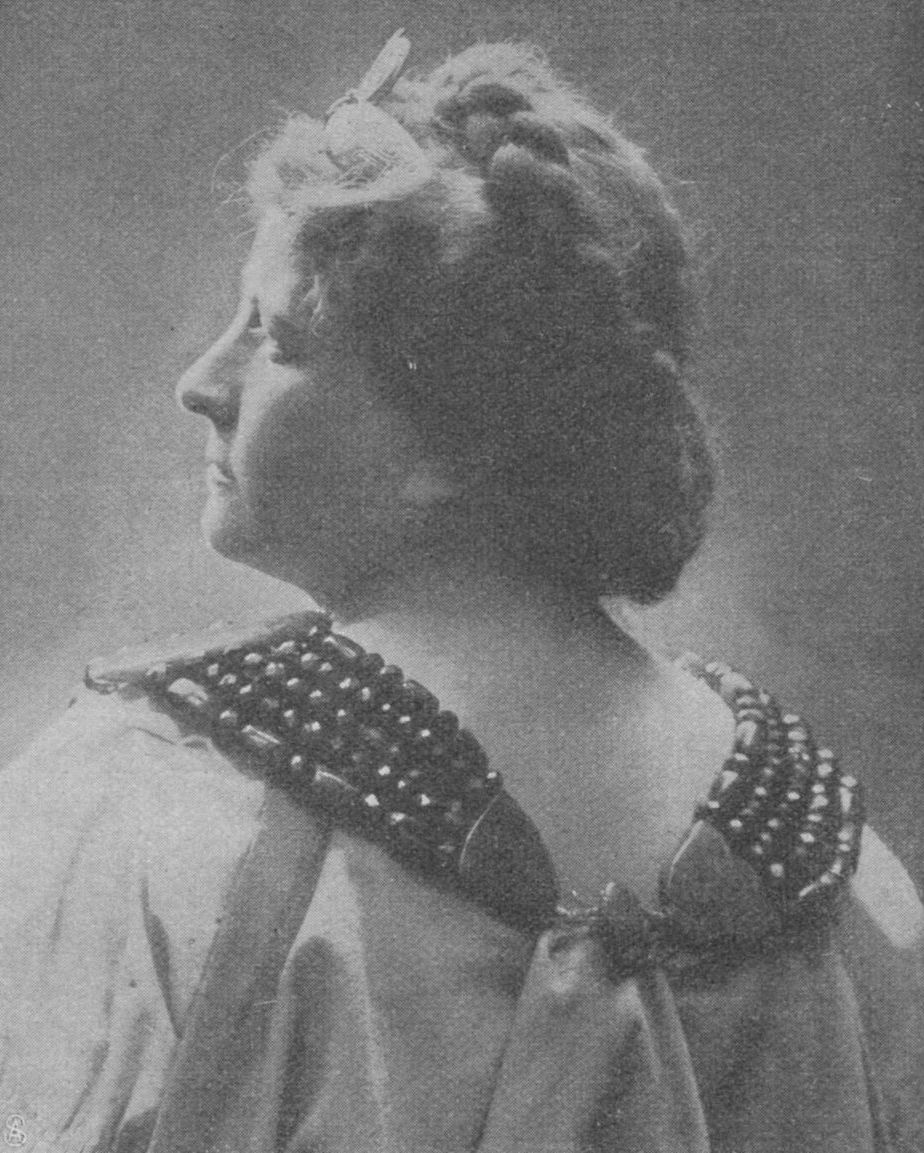

Luise Reuss-Belce (24 October 1862 – 5 March 1945) was an Austrian - German operatic dramatic soprano. In the last years of her life she worked as an opera director and singing teacher.

== Life ==
Born in Vienna, Luise Baumann first appeared under the pseudonym Luise Belce. In 1885 she married the composer and musicologist Eduard Reuss (1851-1911) and from then bore the double name by which she became known. Her daughter Elisabeth Reuss became a concert singer and educator; her son Wilhelm Franz Reuss (1886–1945) became a conductor and composer.

She studied in Vienna with Josef Gänsbacher and in Karlsruhe with Fritz Plank (1848-1900). She made her debut in 1881 at the Großherzogliches Hoftheater [cf. Badisches Staatstheater Karlsruhe] as Elsa in Lohengrin. There she also played other important roles, for example Cassandra in Les Troyens (1890) and the title role in Ingwelde (1894). From 1897 to 1901 she was engaged at the then newly opened Hessisches Staatstheater Wiesbaden. From 1901 to 1903 she was a member of the Metropolitan Opera in New York. From 1901 to 1907 she was a guest at the Hofoper Dresden. In 1884 she made a guest appearance in Munich; 1899 in Amsterdam; 1893 and 1900 at the Covent Garden Opera in London. She also appeared at various other places in Germany.

From 1882 to 1912 Reuss-Belce sang at the Bayreuth Festival where she first appeared in different roles. From 1899 however she sang only the part of Fricka, which was described as her most brilliant role. She proved to be formative for the style of these Wagner-Festspiele. From 1908 to 1933 she was also dramaturgical assistant of the plays.

From 1907 Reuss-Belce performed only in Bayreuth. In 1912 the now widowed Reuss-Belce retired from the stage. She began working as a voice teacher and opera director, in the latter function from 1916 at the Deutsche Oper Berlin. She was also active in Nuremberg after 1913. She ended her career in 1933.

She died in March 1945 in Aichach on the run from the bombing of Dresden. She is said to have been the last singer to perform under Wagner's direction.
