= Weihnachtsbaum (Liszt) =

Suite for piano by Franz Liszt

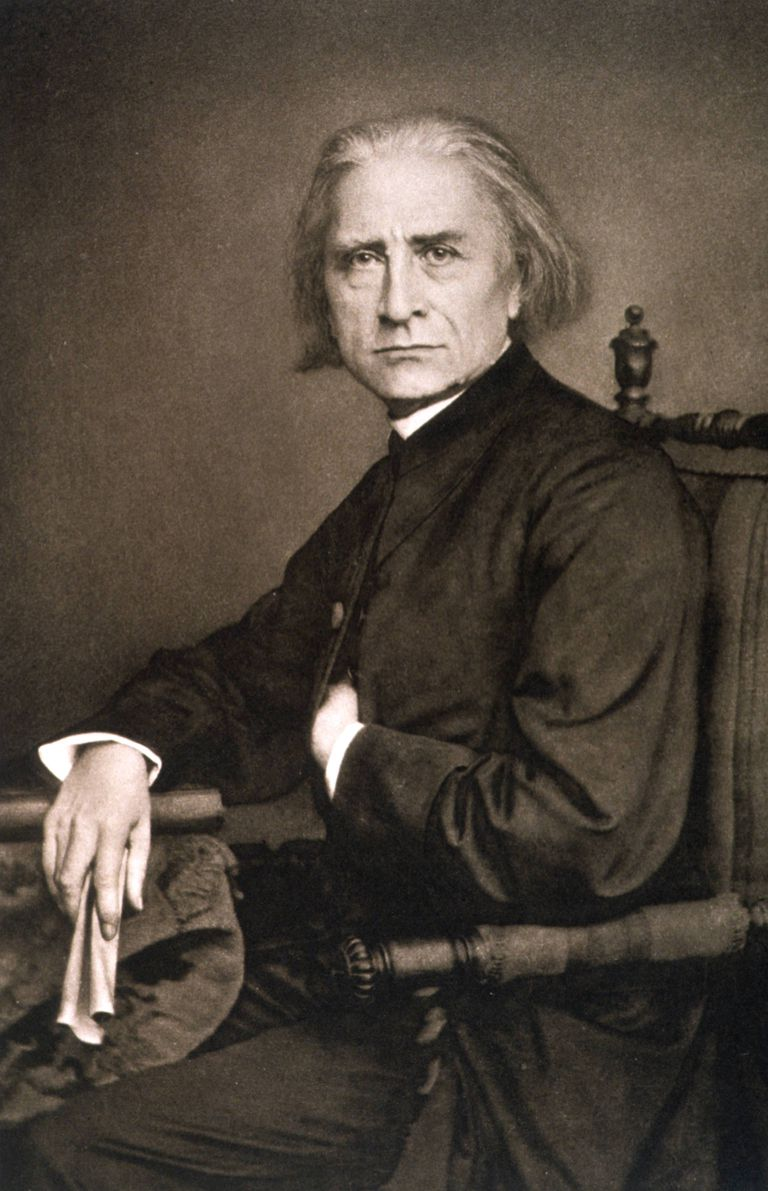
Franz Liszt, photo (mirror-imaged) by Franz Hanfstaengl, June 1870

Weihnachtsbaum (English: Christmas Tree; French: Arbre de Noël) is a suite of 12 pieces written by Franz Liszt in 1873–76, with revisions in 1881. The suite exists in versions for solo piano and piano four-hands. Weihnachtsbaum does not demand great virtuosity, and it has been described as a distant relation of Schumann's Kinderszenen and Debussy's Children's Corner. It occupies an unusual place in Liszt's output, and it may be for these reasons that it has received relatively little attention from performers.

== Background ==
Liszt dedicated Weihnachtsbaum to his first grandchild Daniela von Bülow (1860-1940; daughter of Cosima and Hans von Bülow). Daniela had accompanied her grandfather to Rome due to his frail condition. The first performance was on Christmas Day 1881 in Daniela's Rome hotel room. This was the day on which her mother Cosima always celebrated her birthday, although she was actually born on Christmas Eve.

== Structure ==
A number of the pieces are based on Christmas carols. The individual pieces are:

1. Psallite; Altes Weihnachtslied (Psallite; Old Christmas Song; originally a choral work by Michael Praetorius)
2. O heilige Nacht!; Weihnachtslied nach einer alten Weise (O Holy Night!; Christmas Song in Olden Style)
3. In dulci jubilo: Die Hirten an der Krippe (In dulci jubilo: The Shepherds at the Manger)
4. Adeste fideles: Gleichsam als Marsch der heiligen drei Könige (Adeste Fideles: March of the Three Holy Kings)
5. Scherzoso: Man zündet die Kerzen des Baumes an (Scherzoso: Lighting the Candles on the Tree)
6. Glockenspiel (Carillon)
7. Schlummerlied (Slumber Song)
8. Altes provenzalisches Weihnachtslied (Old Provençal Christmas Song)
9. Abendglocken (Evening Bells)
10. Ehemals (variously trans. as In Days Gone By, Old Times, Long Ago, Formerly)
11. Ungarisch (Hungarian; this is separately dedicated to Liszt's friend Kornél Ábrányi)
12. Polnisch (Polish).

The work is divided into three books of four pieces each. Not all of the pieces have a Christmas connection. In particular, the last three are believed to be autobiographical in nature, depicting Liszt's relationship with Princess Carolyne zu Sayn-Wittgenstein. Ehemals is said to depict their first meeting, and is similar in mood and spirit to the Valses oubliées. Ungarisch and Polnisch are said to represent Liszt and Carolyne individually.

== Versions ==
The first version was for solo piano, written in 1873–74. This was not published, and is catalogued as S. 185a.

In about 1875 Liszt arranged it for piano four hands (S. 612a). This was also not published.

The version for solo piano (or harmonium) was revised 1874–76 (S. 186) and the version for piano four hands was revised 1876-81 (S. 613). These were both published in 1882 by Adolph Fürstner, Berlin.

No. 2, O heilige Nacht!, was revised in 1881 for tenor solo, female chorus and organ or harmonium (S. 49).

The solo piano version of No. 7. Schlummerlied. was revised 1879-81 (S. 186/7a) and this was published by Schirmer, New York, in 1950. The manuscript came into the possession of Liszt's American student Carl Lachmund (1857-1928); it was discovered among a sheaf of assorted papers given to him by Liszt's valet. Lachmund was not aware that it belonged to Weihnachtsbaum specifically; he says in the foreword: "The Roman VII over the title would indicate that the piece might have been intended for some collection". This latest version of Schlummerlied was first performed at the Aeolian Hall, New York, on 12 November 1921, by John Powell.

== Recordings ==
The first recording of Liszt's Weihnachtsbaum was in 1951, by Alfred Brendel. This was also one of Brendel's earliest recordings. Later recordings are by France Clidat, Leslie Howard, Rhondda Gillespie, Roland Pöntinen, Eteri Andjaparidze, Jerome Rose, Pietro Spada and Olivier Vernet. Excerpts have been recorded by Vladimir Horowitz, Ilona Kabos, Stephen Hough and others. The version for piano four hands (S. 613) was recorded by Roberto Szidon and Richard Metzler. Lars David Kellner recorded the first book of 'Weihnachtsbaum' on harmonium.

== Other arrangements ==
In 1952 Anthony Collins arranged four movements from the suite for strings and celesta. Italian composer Giampaolo Testoni has arranged the entire suite for orchestra, as has the British musician Rob Howe.
