= Marie Gabriel Augustin Savard =

French composer and teacher

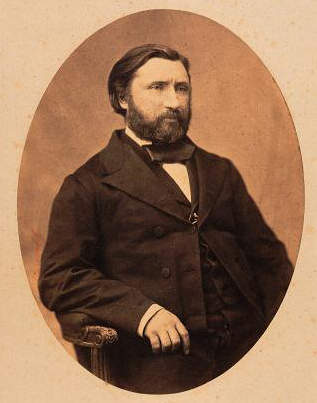
Augustin Savard by Pierre Petit

Marie Gabriel Augustin Savard (21 August 1814 – 7 June 1881) was a French composer and teacher.

Savard was a teacher at the Paris Conservatory in tonic solfa, harmony and figured bass. Among his pupils were Jules Massenet, Cécile Chaminade, Eduard Reuss, and Edward MacDowell. See: List of music students by teacher: R to S#Marie Gabriel Augustin Savard. Massenet describes him fondly in his memoires. His works include the following:

- Kyrie (1860) (Niedermeyer)
- Messe solennelle (1865)

He also published books on music theory and a compilation of plainsong chants. These include:

- Cours complet d'Harmonie théorique et pratique (1853) and
- Principes de la musique et méthode de transposition (1865), Librairie Hachette et cie., Paris

The latter work was approved by L'Académie des beaux-arts of the Institut de France under such notables as Daniel Auber, Ambroise Thomas, Hector Berlioz and Fromental Halévy.

He was the father of Marie Emmanuel Augustin Savard.
