= Eduard Reuss =

German composer and academic (1851–1911)

Eduard Reuss (16 September 1851 – 18 February 1911) was a German composer, pianist, music educator, and writer on music. He is best known for his writings on composer Franz Liszt, including a highly regarded biography Ein Lebensbild (1898). He also authored the book Liszts Lieder (1906) and penned several essays on the life and works of Liszt. As a composer, he mainly produced works for solo piano and also made arrangements of several works by Liszt.

== Life and career ==
Born in New York City to German immigrants to the United States, Reuss lived most of his life in Germany. He began his musical training at the age of 11 in Göttingen where he was a pupil of composer and music critic Eduard Krüger (1807–1885) from 1862 to 1869. He then became a disciple of Franz Liszt, studying with the great composer from 1870 to 1879. He was also a student of Marie Gabriel Augustin Savard in Paris in 1876–1877.

In 1880, Reuss joined the teaching staff at the Karlsruhe Conservatory where he remained until 1896 when he joined the faculty of the Wiesbaden Conservatory. He was appointed director of that institution in 1899 where he remained until 1902. He then traveled to the United States with his wife, the dramatic soprano Luise Reuss-Belce, whom he had married earlier in 1885. The couple toured together through the US with Eduard accompanying his wife on the piano in a series of concerts in 1902–1903.

== Sources ==
- Theodore Baker (1919). Baker's Biographical Dictionary of Musicians. G. Schirmer, Inc. p. 758.
