= Marie Emmanuel Augustin Savard =

French composer (1861–1942)

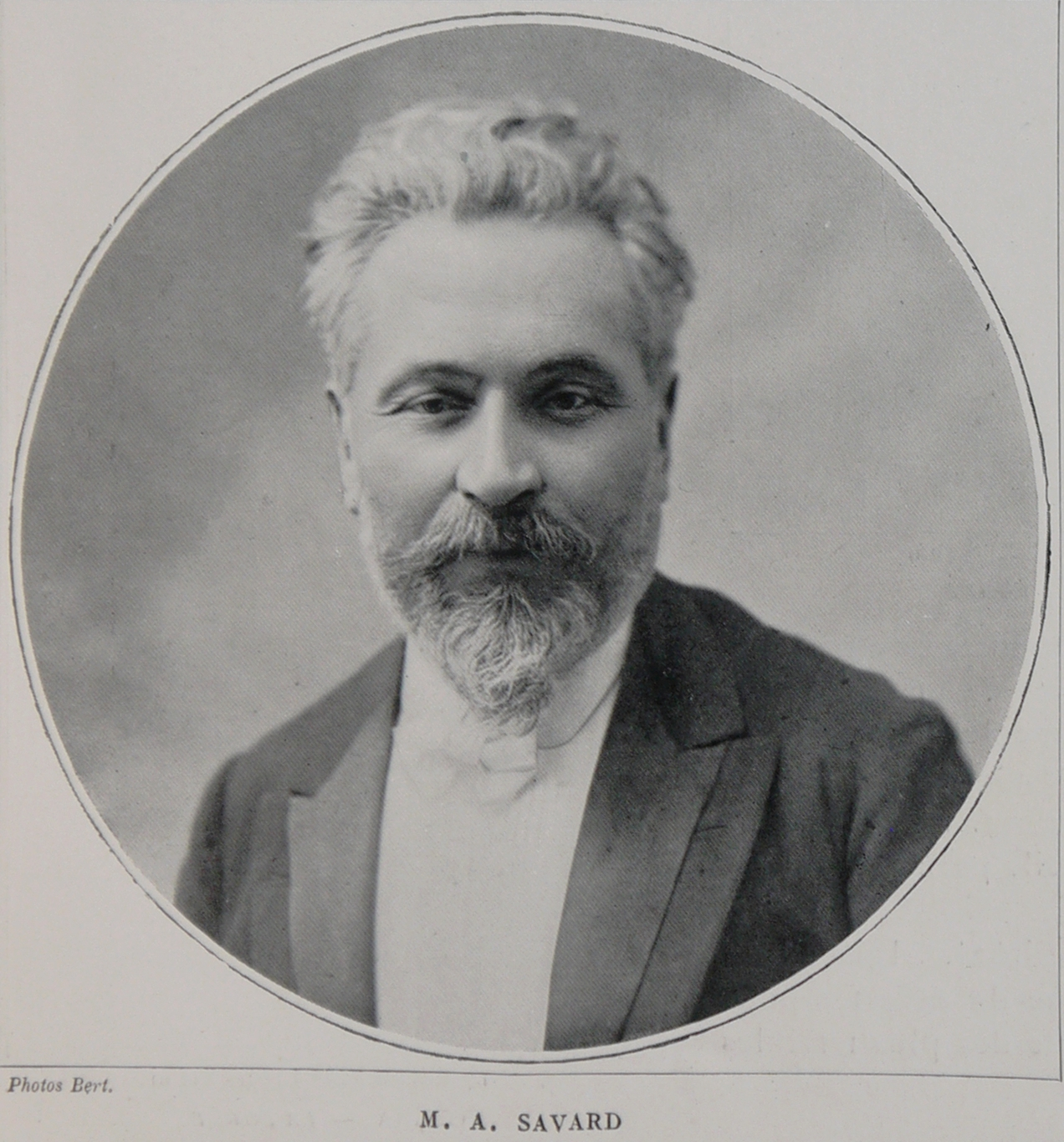

Marie Emmanuel Augustin Savard (15 May 1861, Paris – 6 December 1942, Lyons) was a French composer.

He was the son of Marie Gabriel Augustin Savard. He studied with Jules Massenet at the Conservatoire de Paris and in 1886, he won first prize in the Prix de Rome for an oratorio entitled La Vision de Saül.

An opera, La Forêt (légende musicale en 2 actes), with a libretto by Laurent Tailhade (1854-1919) was published in 1910 (Enoch et cie., Paris). The music uses modal and whole-tone scales, as well as a great deal of chromaticism.

From 1902 until his retirement in 1921, he directed the Lyon Conservatory.
