= Valeriy Sokolov =

Ukrainian violinist

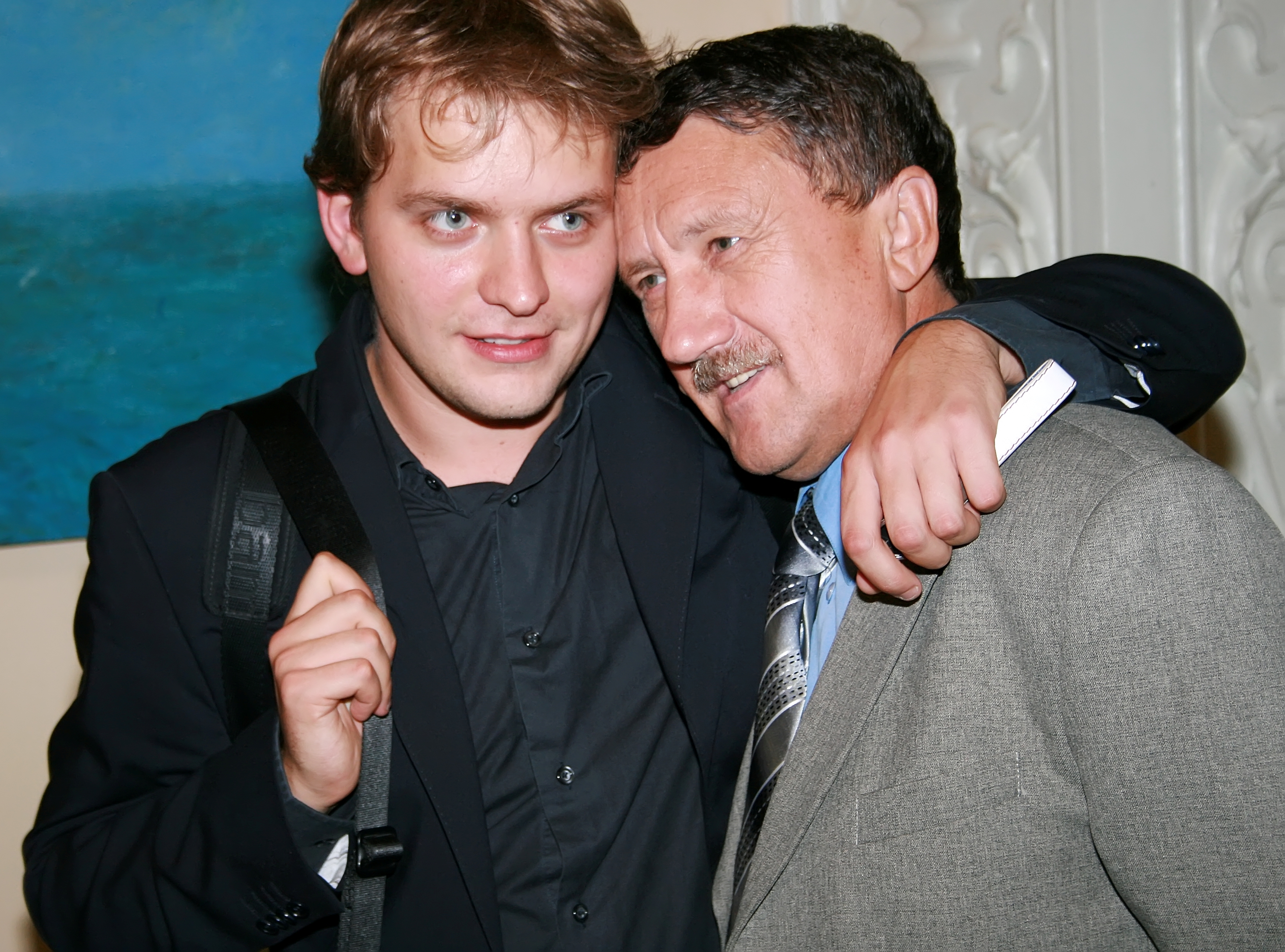
Valeriy Sokolov (left) with Sergey Evdokimov

Valeriy Sokolov (born September 22, 1986) is a Ukrainian violinist.

Sokolov was born in Kharkiv.

He was awarded the Study Grant Prize at the International Pablo Sarasate Competition in Pamplona, Spain in 1999 which provided him with a scholarship to study with Natalia Boyarskaya at the Yehudi Menuhin School, England.

In September 2005, Sokolov took part in the George Enescu Festival and won the Grand Prix with a performance of Beethoven's Violin Concerto; he also won Best Performance for Enescu’s Violin Sonata No. 3 as well as the Enescu Foundation Prize.

In 2006 and 2007, he performed with the Chamber Orchestra of Europe and Douglas Boyd, the Bournemouth Symphony and Yan Pascal Tortelier as well as with Orchester Musikkollegium Winterthur under Howard Griffiths. Elsewhere, he performed with the Bremen Philharmonic and Stefan Blunier, and the Basel Symphony Orchestra with Rumon Gamba. Sokolov made his US orchestral debut in summer 2007, performing at Aspen Music Festival and Grand Teton Music Festival, and, upon special invitation of David Zinman, at the Blossom Festival with the Cleveland Orchestra.

In February 2008, he gave the US premiere of Boris Tishchenko’s Concerto for Piano and Violin at Carnegie Hall, New York and at the Library of Congress, Washington. Sokolov returned to the Aspen festival in August 2008 to perform Bartók's Violin Concerto No 2 with Peter Oundjian.

Upon Lawrence Foster’s personal invitation, Sokolov recorded Enescu's Violin Sonata No 3, complementing Mr. Foster's recording of Enescu's Octet in a transcription for symphony orchestra, released on CD at the beginning of 2009 on the EMI/Virgin label.

In recent seasons he has appeared with the Tonhalle Orchester Zürich, the Chamber Orchestra of Europe, the Orchestre National de Bordeaux-Aquitaine, and made debuts with the Rotterdam Philharmonic Orchestra, Die Deutsche Kammerphilharmonie Bremen, the Orchestre National de France and the Tokyo Symphony Orchestra. Conductors with whom he has worked include David Zinman, Vladimir Ashkenazy, Ivor Bolton and Ludovic Morlot. He has appeared in recital at the Wigmore Hall, the Théâtre du Châtelet and the Festspielhaus Baden-Baden.

In March 2017 he is scheduled to perform the Bartók Violin Concerto No 2 with the NDR Elbphilharmonie Orchestra under Juraj Valčuha.

Sokolov resides in Germany.
