= Litanies (Mozart) =

Four works of church music by Mozart, 1769 to 1776

- Vocal church music by W. A. Mozart
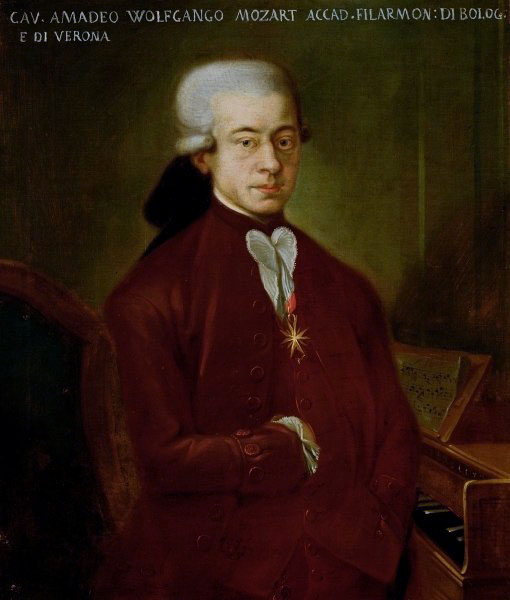
- Mozart, 1777 copy of a painting
- Text: Liturgical
- Language: Latin
- Composed: 1771–1776
- Vocal: SATB choir and soloists
- Instrumental: orchestra; continuo

Wolfgang Amadeus Mozart composed four litanies in his service as a church musician for the Salzburg Cathedral, two of which are settings of the Litaniae Lauretanae, the Litany of the Blessed Virgin Mary. The other two are settings of the Litaniae de venerabili altaris sacramento, venerating the Eucharist. Mozart composed the works for four soloists, choir, instruments, and continuo. The litanies appeared in Bärenreiter's Neue Mozart-Ausgabe (NMA) in 1969.

== History ==
Mozart composed four litanies in his service as a church musician for the Prince-Archbishop of Salzburg. Litanies are prayers repeating acclamations, sometimes in responsory form.

Mozart returned from his first Italian journey, begun in December 1769, to his Salzburg position as a Konzertmeister of the archbishop in March 1771. He composed his first litany, K. 109, dated May 1771, in the spirit of the Italian music he had encountered on his trip. It is a setting of the Marian litany Litaniae Lauretanae (Litany of Loreto, or Litany of the Blessed Virgin Mary). The work requires only a small orchestra of violins and continuo, with optionally trombones playing with the voices, which suggests that it may have been intended for the chapel of Schloss Mirabell. Mozart structured it in five movements, similar to a composition of the text by his father Leopold.

Mozart completed his second litany, K. 125, in March 1772, between his second journey to Italy and his third. It is a sacramental litany, Litaniae de venerabili altaris sacramento (Litanies of the venerated sacrament of the altar), venerating the Eucharist. The work in nine movements is scored for the same vocal forces, but a rich orchestra with woodwinds. The work was again modelled after a composition by Leopold Mozart of the same text. The autograph shows some changes from his hand.

Mozart wrote his third litany, K. 195, another Marian litany, in 1774, between journeys to Vienna and Munich. An extended composition with virtuoso writing for soloists, it is one of the Litaniae solemnes performed at the Salzburg Cathedral.

Mozart composed another sacramental litany, K. 243, in March 1776. Structured in six movements, it shows that Mozart studied the style of his predecessors at the cathedral, namely a double-fugue by Michael Haydn. He wrote music for solo instruments. Each section of invocations is concluded by a repeat of the beginning. This litany is regarded as his "most extensive contribution" to the genre.

Mozart's litanies appeared in Bärenreiter's Neue Mozart-Ausgabe (NMA, New Mozart Edition), a critical edition, in 1969 in series I, part (Abteilung) 2/1: Litanies, edited by Hellmut Federhofer and Renate Federhofer-Königs. Further prints appeared in 1991 and 2005. Carus-Verlag published the litanies beginning in 2001 as part of the Stuttgarter Mozart Ausgaben.

== Litanies ==
Mozart composed the Latin text of the litanies for soloists, choir, instruments and continuo. The following table lists for each the title, number in the latest Köchel catalogue (K.), number in the former catalogue, year of composition, key and number of movements (Mvmts).

| Name | K. | K. (old) | Year | Key | Mvmts |
|---|---|---|---|---|---|
| Litaniae Lauretanae | 109 | 74e | 1771 | B♭ major | 5 |
| Litaniae de venerabili altaris sacramento | 125 | | 1772 | B♭ major | 9 |
| Litaniae Lauretanae | 195 | 186d | 1774 | D major | 5 |
| Litaniae de venerabili altaris sacramento | 243 | | 1776 | E♭ major | 6 |
