= String Quartet No. 2 (Mendelssohn) =

Composition by Felix Mendelssohn

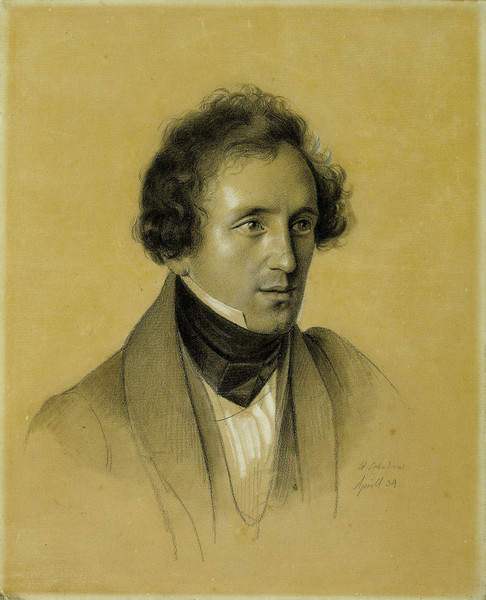
Felix Mendelssohn by Friedrich Wilhelm Schadow, 1834

The String Quartet No. 2 in A minor, Op. 13, was composed by Felix Mendelssohn in 1827. Written when he was 18 years old, it was, despite its official number, Mendelssohn's first mature string quartet.

== Movements ==
III. Intermezzo: Allegretto con moto – Allegro di molto
Played by the Carmel Quartet

This work has four movements:

1. Adagio (A major) – Allegro vivace (A minor, sonata form) (Note: Mendelssohn originally wrote the repeat sign for the exposition, but later the repeat sign was removed in copyist's manuscript.)
2. Adagio non lento (F major)
3. Intermezzo: Allegretto con moto (A minor) – Allegro di molto (Note: Autograph gives poco più mosso, which is replaced first by Più Presto, then Allegro di molto, in copyist's manuscript.) (A major)
4. Presto (Note: Composer used Molto Allegro in autograph, it was replaced by Presto in copyist's manuscript.) (A minor) – Adagio non lento (A major)

A typical performance lasts roughly 28 minutes.

== Composition ==
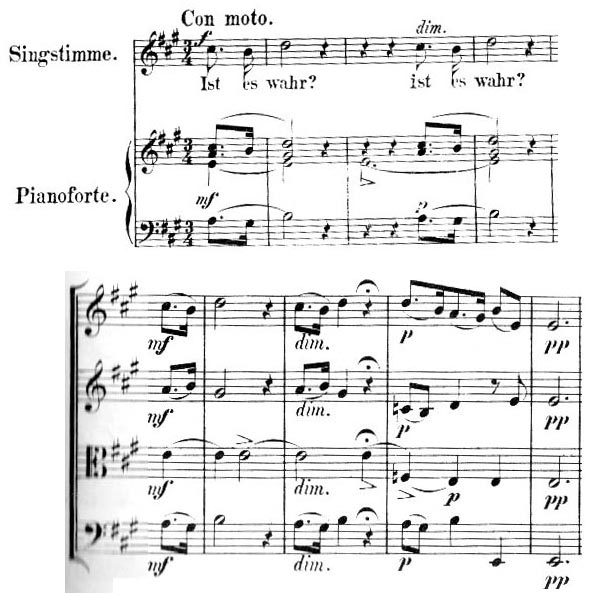
The motif of Mendelssohn's song "Ist es wahr?", and the motif as it appears in the opening Adagio of the quartet.

Though Mendelssohn was still a teenager when he wrote this quartet, he was already an experienced composer of chamber music. He had already written the String Quintet, Op. 18, the Octet for Strings, Op. 20, and three piano quartets, besides several youthful string quartets which remained unpublished. A few months beforehand he had produced his opera Die Hochzeit des Camacho, which was not a success. (His quartet Opus 12, though it bears an earlier opus number, was actually written two years later.)

Mendelssohn wrote the quartet a few months after the death of Ludwig van Beethoven, and the influence of Beethoven's late string quartets (written only shortly before and some of which had not even been published when Mendelssohn started his composition) is evident in this work. Beethoven's late works received a lukewarm reception at best, and many – including Mendelssohn's own father Abraham – agreed with composer Louis Spohr that they were an "indecipherable, uncorrected horror". Mendelssohn, however, was fascinated by them: he studied all the scores he could obtain and included several allusions to Beethoven's quartets in Opus 13. But more than being simply a homage to his great predecessor, Mendelssohn's quartet takes the implications of Beethoven's late quartets – above all their suggestions of cyclic formal organization – and develops them in radically new directions. As Benedict Taylor writes in a very detailed analysis, this quartet "is the most thorough-going essay in cyclic form, both by Mendelssohn and by any composer to that time, until the late works of Franck at the very least".

As a unifying motif, Mendelssohn included a quotation from his song "Ist es wahr?" ('Is it true?', Op. 9, no. 1) – "Is it true that you wait for me in the arbour by the vineyard wall?" – composed a few months earlier. Mendelssohn includes the title of the song in the score of the quartet, recalling the title Beethoven wrote on the last movement of his Op. 135 string quartet "Muss es sein?" (Must it be?). But, unlike the introspective, existential quality of Beethoven's quartet, Mendelssohn's work is passionate and richly romantic. "...This quartet, relying heavily on compositional techniques of late Beethoven, links Classical form to Romantic expression," writes Lucy Miller.

== Analysis ==
The three-note motif from "Ist es wahr?", presented in an opening Adagio in the key of A Major, establishes the cyclic form of the quartet; derivatives of the motif appear in all four of the movements, and the opening theme concludes the quartet. After the Adagio introduction, the quartet breaks into a tumultuous Allegro Vivace in Sonata form in A minor. "You will hear its notes resound in the first and last movements, and sense its feeling in all four" wrote Mendelssohn to a friend. So the quartet, which is mostly in minor keys, and is primarily minor in character, opens and closes in a major key – a rather daring departure from standard quartet-writing practice of the time. Many writers have seen a resemblance to Beethoven's Op. 132 quartet: that quartet, also, has an opening adagio, then a first theme built of running sixteenth notes and a lyrical passage, which is loosely akin to an inversion of Mendelssohn's theme.

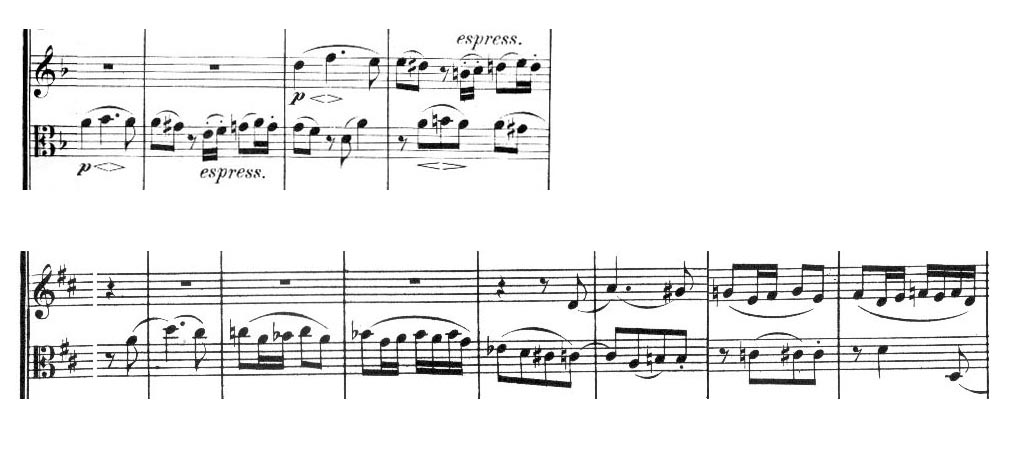
The fugal motifs from the slow movements of Mendelssohn's Opus 13 (top) and Beethoven's Opus 95 (bottom). Second violin and viola parts are shown.

The Adagio movement has a middle slow, fugal section which is modelled after the fugal middle section of the slow movement of Beethoven's Op. 95. The subjects of both fugues are sinuous melodies that slide down chromatically, moving from viola to second violin and then to the other voices. Like the Beethoven model, the fugue goes through a series of increasingly complex variations with cross-rhythms in the different instruments.

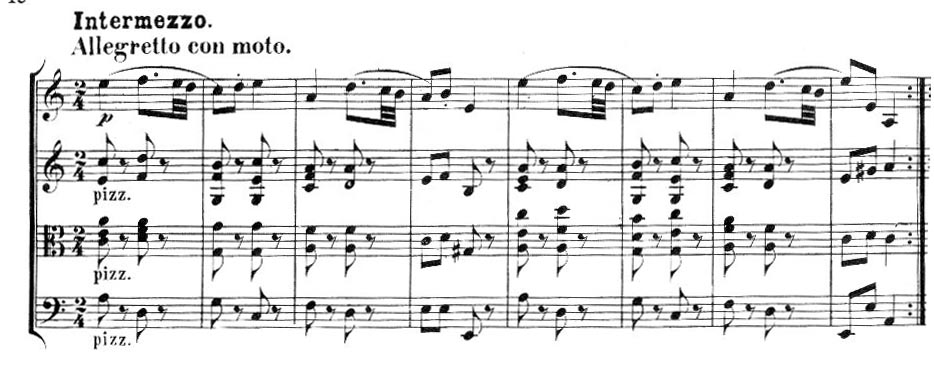
The theme of the Intermezzo movement, with lyrical violin theme and pizzicato accompaniment

The Intermezzo movement opens with a light, gossamer theme which is Mendelssohn's signature style. The lilting theme in the first violin, with pizzicato accompaniment in the other instruments, recalls the A Midsummer Night's Dream Overture and scherzo movements from many of Mendelssohn's chamber works.

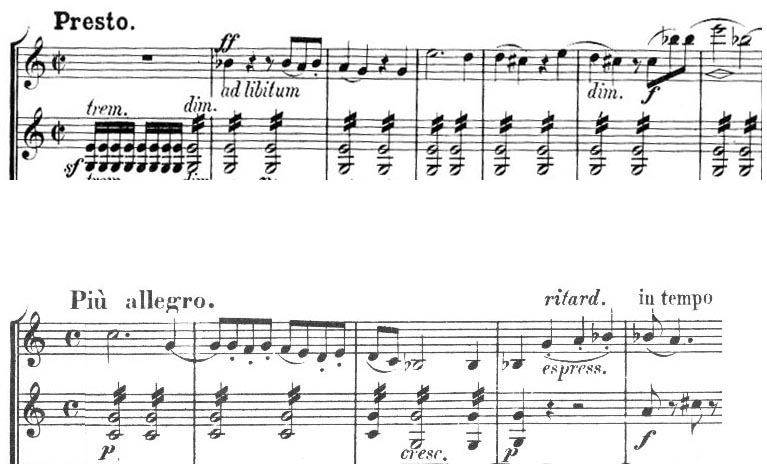
The violin cadenzas, with tremolo accompaniment, that introduce the final movements of the Mendelssohn quartet (top) and the Beethoven Opus 132 (bottom). First and second violin parts shown.

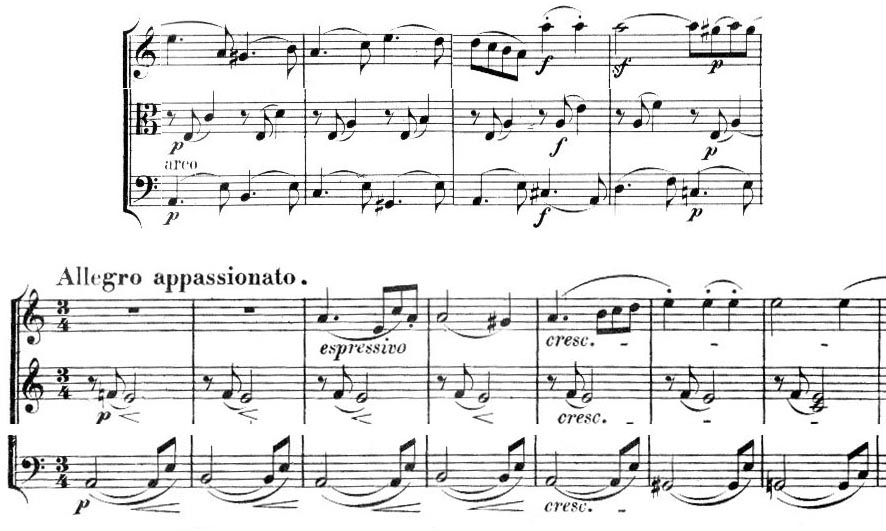
The themes of the finales of the Mendelssohn quartet and Beethoven Opus 132. Note the cello parts and the interlocking inner voices (viola part in the Mendelssohn, second violin in the Beethoven. Fourth part not shown).

The final movement of Beethoven's Op. 132 quartet is a prototype for the opening of Mendelssohn's last movement: it begins with a cadenza interlude in the first violin, leading into a fast, melodic movement with a driving bass line in the cello which is similar to the cello part of Op. 132.
