= Symphony No. 5 (Villa-Lobos) =

- A Paz
- lost choral symphony by Heitor Villa-Lobos
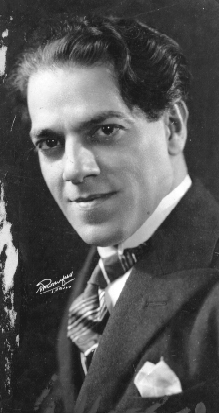
- Heitor Villa-Lobos
- English: Peace
- Catalogue: W170
- Language: Portuguese
- Composed: 1920
- Movements: Four
- Scoring: Orchestra, brass band, SATB chorus

Symphony No. 5, subtitled A Paz (Peace), is a composition by the Brazilian composer Heitor Villa-Lobos, written in 1920. The score has been lost.

== History ==
According to the official account, Villa-Lobos composed his Fifth Symphony in 1920. It is the third of a trilogy of programmatic symphonies written to commemorate World War I, based on arguments by Luís Gastão d'Escragnolle Dória. It is also the last of a cycle of five symphonies in the style of Vincent d'Indy. It was never performed, and the score has been lost.

A programme documenting a performance on 5 March 1961 at Carnegie Hall in New York, by the New York Philharmonic conducted by Eleazar de Carvalho appears to have been a hoax. When asked by the Museu Villa-Lobos for confirmation, the conductor informed them that he had never had a copy of the score, and that concert never took place. Although a memorial concert in Carnegie Hall by members of the New York Philharmonic conducted by Carvalho was announced for that date, the all-Villa-Lobos programme was to include the Madonna Fantasia, the Cello Concerto in A minor, Bachianas Brasileiras No. 5, and Uirapuri [sic]. No mention was made of any symphony.

In any case, Lisa Peppercorn doubts that the work was actually completed in 1920 but only progressed beyond the conception of the idea in 1946. According to her, the Ricordi catalogue of Villa-Lobos's works published on 30 June 1965 lists the symphony under the title Odisséa da Paz, and states it was composed in 1921. David Appleby, on the other hand, gives this as the subtitle of the Seventh Symphony.

== Analysis ==
The symphony has four movements:

1. Allegro
2. Scherzo
3. Moderato
4. Allegro grandioso

In 1928 or 1929, Villa-Lobos explained to music journalist Suzanne Demarquez that the as-yet unperformed Fifth Symphony, like its two predecessors, added a wind band to the orchestra, but also included a mixed chorus singing nonsense syllables borrowed from several languages: Russian, French, Chinese, African, etc. The object of such a text is to explore the influence of phonemes and rhythm on musical effect, as he did again later in the choir parts of the Nonet and Chôros No. 10.
