= Piano Sonata in B minor (Liszt) =

1853 composition by Franz Liszt

Piano Sonata
- by Franz Liszt
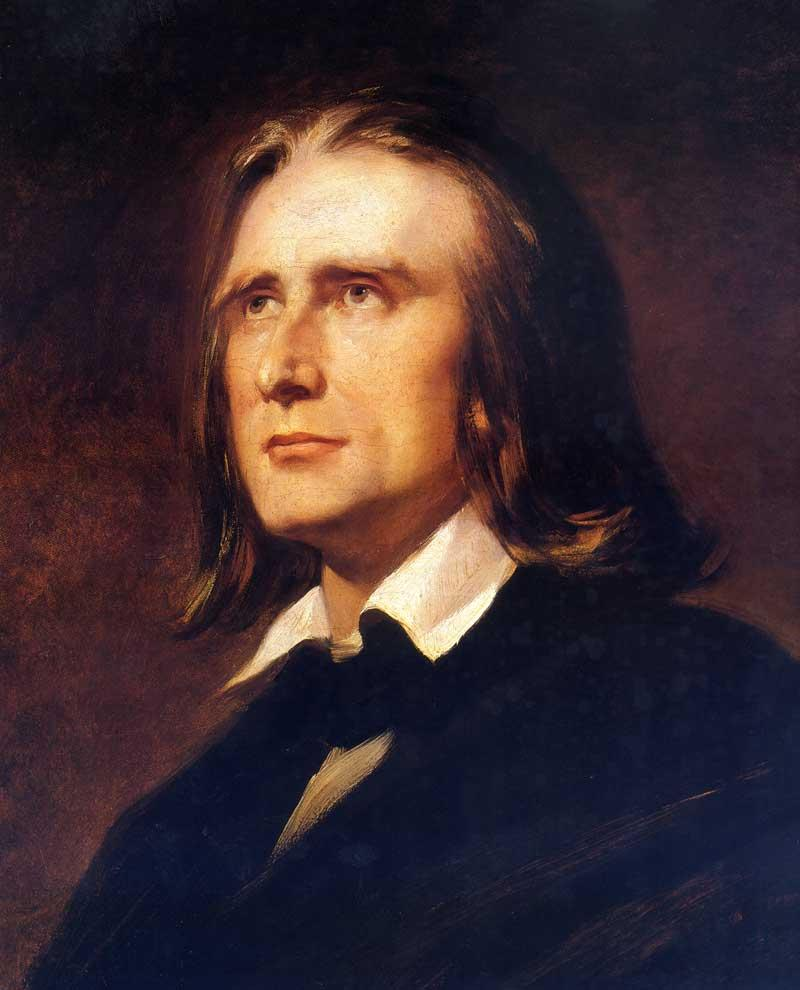
- Portrait of Liszt, 1856
- Key: B minor
- Catalogue: S. 178
- Composed: 1842–53, Weimar
- Dedication: Robert Schumann
- Published: 1854
- Publisher: Breitkopf & Härtel
- Duration: c. 30 minutes
- Movements: 1
- Scoring: Solo piano

Premiere
- Date: 27 January 1857
- Location: Berlin
- Performers: Hans von Bülow

The Piano Sonata in B minor (German: Klaviersonate h-moll), S. 178, is a single-movement piano sonata by Franz Liszt. Liszt completed the work during his time in Weimar, Germany, in 1853, a year before it was published in 1854 and performed in 1857. He dedicated the piece to Robert Schumann in return for Schumann's dedication to Liszt in his Fantasie in C major, Op. 17. A typical performance of this piece lasts around 30 minutes.

== History ==
Liszt noted on the sonata's manuscript that it was completed on 2 February 1853, but he had composed an earlier version by 1849. At this point in his life, Liszt's career as a traveling virtuoso had almost entirely subsided, as Carolyne zu Sayn-Wittgenstein had influenced him to concentrate on composing rather than performing. Liszt settled in Weimar in 1848 where he devoted himself to composition, and to living a comfortable lifestyle, composing, and occasionally performing, entirely by choice rather than necessity.

The sonata was dedicated to Robert Schumann, in return for Schumann's dedication of his Fantasie in C major, Op. 17 (published 1839) to Liszt. A copy of the work arrived at Schumann's house in May 1854, after he had entered Endenich sanatorium. Pianist and composer Clara Schumann did not perform the sonata despite her marriage to Robert Schumann; according to scholar Alan Walker she found it "merely a blind noise".

== Music ==
Sonata in B minor
Performed by Jorge Bolet

No other work of Liszt's has attracted anywhere near the amount of scholarly attention paid to the Sonata in B minor. It has provoked a wide range of divergent theories from those of its admirers who feel compelled to search for hidden meanings. This is because Liszt himself never assigned any sort of programmatic meaning to it, and thus can still be analyzed in purely musical terms. However, many scholars have read meaning into the music, and possibilities include the following:

- it is a musical portrait of the Faust legend, with "Faust", "Gretchen", and "Mephistopheles" themes symbolizing the main characters;
- it is autobiographical; its musical contrasts spring from the conflicts within Liszt's own personality;
- it is about the divine and the diabolical; it is based on the Bible and on John Milton's Paradise Lost.
- it is an allegory set in the Garden of Eden; it deals with the Fall of man and contains "God", "Lucifer", "Serpent", "Adam", and "Eve" themes;
- as stated above, it has no programmatic allusions; it is a piece of "expressive form" with no meaning beyond itself.

The complexity of the sonata means no analytical interpretation has been widely accepted. Some analyses suggest that the sonata has four movements, although there is no gap between them. Superimposed upon the four movements is a large sonata form structure, although the precise beginnings and endings of the traditional development and recapitulation sections have long been a topic of debate. Others claim a three-movement form, an extended one-movement sonata form, and a rotational three-movement work with a double exposition and recapitulation. An average performance of the sonata lasts approximately 30 minutes.

=== Analysis ===
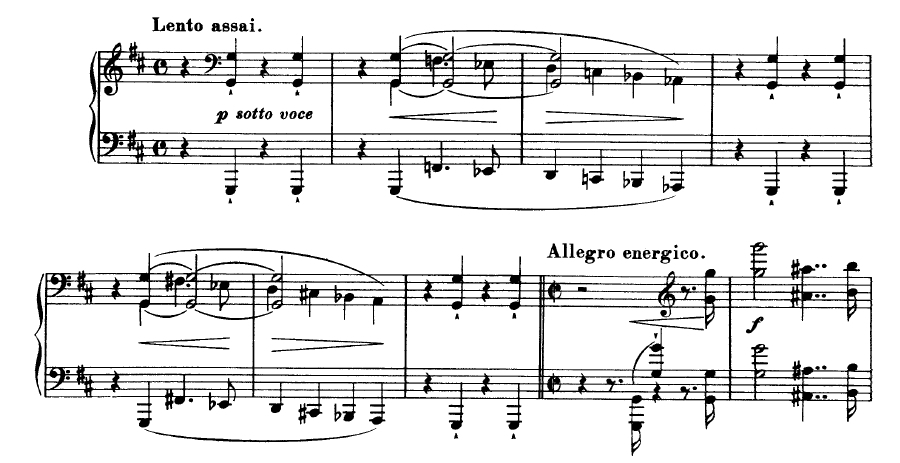
Opening of Liszt's Sonata in B minor, with the first theme marked Lento assai and the second theme marked Allegro energico

While its distinct movements: allegro, adagio, scherzo and finale are combined into one, the entire work is encompassed within an overarching sonata form — exposition, development, and recapitulation. Liszt is said to have composed a sonata within a sonata, which is part of the work's uniqueness, and he was economical with his thematic material. The first page contains three motive ideas that provide the basis for nearly all that follows, with the ideas being transformed throughout.

The marcato motif in the sonata

The first theme is a descending scale marked Lento assai; full of ominous undertow. It reappears at crucial points in the work's structure, especially in the coda. After the first theme, the time signature changes from 4/4 to alla breve, and the second theme marked Allegro energico, consisting of a jagged, forceful motif in octaves, is introduced. This is quickly followed by the third theme, which Liszt characterized as Hammerschlag ('hammer-blow') to describe the single note repetition in the theme. A dialogue ensues, with mounting energy, until reaching the noble Grandioso material in D major. Liszt transforms the "hammer-blow" motif into a grand melodic gesture marked cantando espressivo. The slow movement, an Andante sostenuto in F♯ major, is the centerpiece of the sonata. This fully-fledged movement, in compound ternary form, features, in quick succession, a number of themes heard earlier in the sonata in a tour de force of thematic economy.

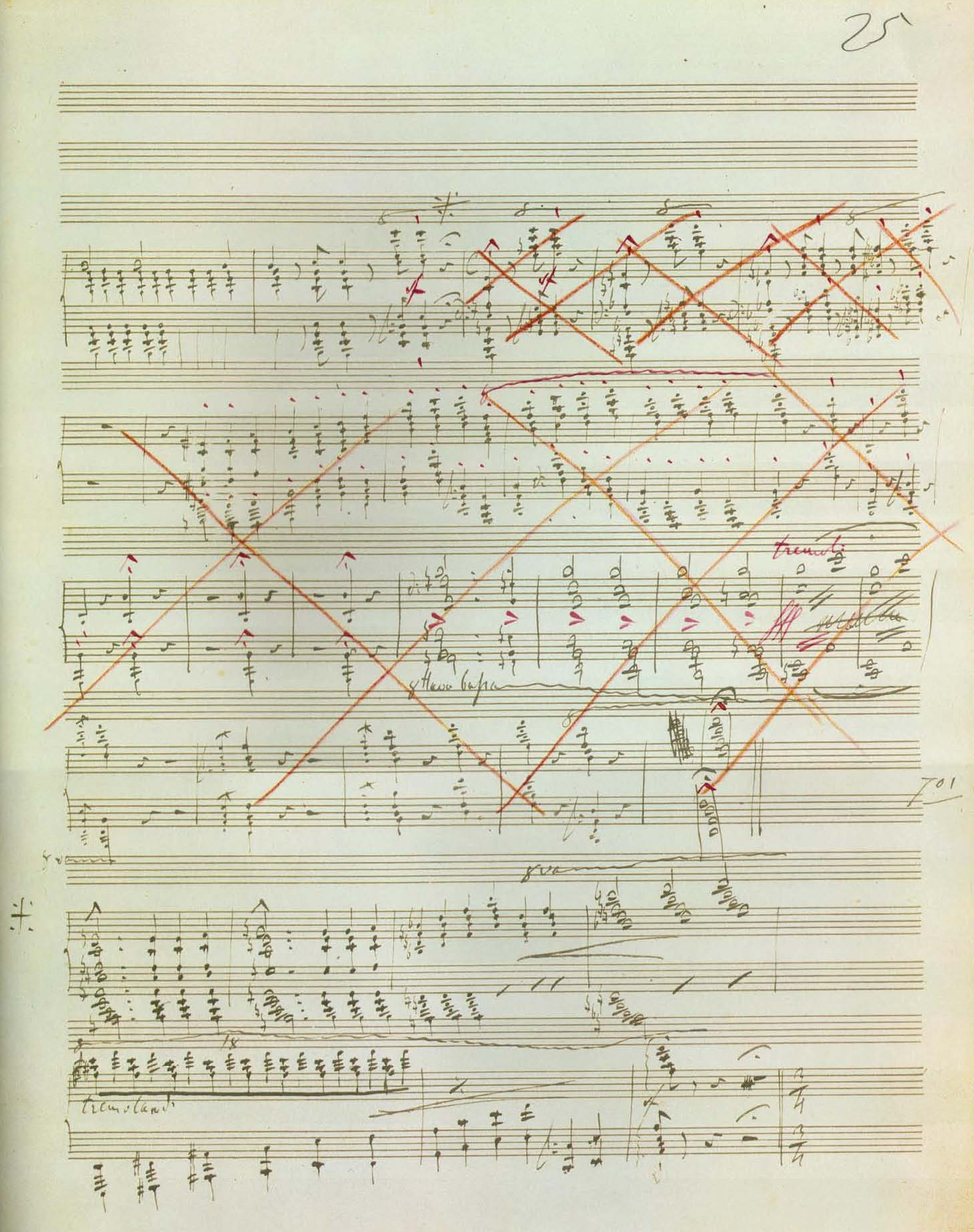
Page 25 of the manuscript. The large section crossed out in red contains the original loud ending.

The recapitulation opens with a fugue in B♭ minor, that can also function as a scherzo. Each of the sections are examples of Classical forms, which means that this piece is one of the first instances of Double-function form, a musical piece which has two classical forms happening at the same time; one containing the other. Already in 1851 Liszt experimented with a non-programmatic "four-movements-in-one" form in an extended work for piano solo called Grosses Concert-Solo. This piece, which in 1865 was published as a two-piano version under the title Concerto pathétique, shows a thematic relationship to both the sonata and the later Faust Symphony. Walker claims the quiet ending of the sonata was an afterthought; the original manuscript contains a crossed-out ending section which would have ended the work in a loud flourish instead.

== Reception ==
The sonata was published by Breitkopf & Härtel in 1854 and first performed on 27 January 1857 in Berlin by Hans von Bülow. It was attacked by Eduard Hanslick who said "anyone who has heard it and finds it beautiful is beyond help". Johannes Brahms reputedly fell asleep when Liszt performed the work in 1853, and it was also criticized by the pianist and composer Anton Rubinstein. However, the sonata drew enthusiasm from Richard Wagner following a private performance of the piece by Karl Klindworth on April 5, 1855. Otto Gumprecht of the German newspaper National-Zeitung referred to it as "an invitation to hissing and stomping". It took a long time for the sonata to become commonplace in concert repertoire because of its technical difficulty and negative initial reception due to its status as "new" music. However by the early stages of the twentieth century, the piece had become established as a pinnacle of Liszt's repertoire and has been a popularly performed and extensively analyzed piece ever since.

=== Arrangements ===
Camille Saint-Saëns, a close friend of Liszt, made a two-piano arrangement of the sonata in 1914, but it was never published in his lifetime because of rights issues. It was first published in 2004 by Édition Durand in Paris, edited by Sabrina Teller Ratner. According to a letter from Saint-Saëns to Jacques Durand, dated 23 August 1914, the two-piano arrangement was something that Liszt had announced but never realized.

Leó Weiner made an orchestral arrangement of the sonata in 1955. The arrangement has not been published and exists only in manuscript form. It was recorded in 2006 by the orchestra of Hochschule für Musik Franz Liszt, Weimar with Nicolás Pasquet conducting, and in 2009 by the North Hungarian Symphony Orchestra under László Kovács for the label Hungaroton.

Heinz Roemheld orchestrated the sonata which is heard on some 1930s films, including The Black Cat (1934), starring Boris Karloff and Bela Lugosi, The Raven (1935), as well as the Flash Gordon serials (1936) (Chapters 6–13), Werewolf of London (1936), and Mars Attacks the World (1938).

There is an orchestrated excerpt version of the sonata in the 1952 film Hans Christian Andersen starring Danny Kaye where the ballet scene for "The Little Mermaid" is danced near the end of the film.

An orchestrated version of the lyrical parts of the sonata appears in the 1960 Hollywood film of Liszt's life called Song Without End.

Frederick Ashton used the sonata for his 1963 ballet Marguerite and Armand, created for Margot Fonteyn and Rudolf Nureyev, based on "The Lady of the Camellias" by Alexandre Dumas, fils. The original performances used an orchestral transcription of the sonata by Humphrey Searle. In 1968 the Royal Ballet commissioned a new arrangement, by Gordon Jacob.

An organ transcription of the sonata was made in 1984 by Bernhard Haas. Other transcriptions for organ includes one by Nathan Laube, which was performed in 2022.

There is also a transcription of the sonata for solo cello made by cellist Johann Sebastian Paetsch in 2013. This has been published by the Hofmeister Musikverlag in Leipzig.

== Recordings ==
The sonata is considered a standard of the piano repertoire. Below is an incomplete list of recordings by various artists.

Year	Pianist	Label	Uninterrupted?	Live recording
1932	Vladimir Horowitz	Sony Classical	Yes	
1950	Arthur Rubinstein	RCA Records	No	
1958	Lazar Berman	Saga Records	Yes	
1960	Leon Fleisher	Epic Records	No	
1965	Emil Gilels	RCA Records	No	
1966	Sviatoslav Richter	Philips Classics	No	X
1970	Claudio Arrau	Philips Classics	No	
1971	André Watts	CBS Records	No	
1972	Martha Argerich	Deutsche Grammophon	No	
1972	Claudio Arrau	Doremi	Yes	X
1974	Lazar Berman	Melodiya	Yes	X
1975	Van Cliburn	RCA Records	Yes	
1984	Jorge Bolet	Decca	No	
1986	André Watts	Hänssler	Yes	X
1987	Louis Lortie	Chandos	Yes	
1989	Vladimir Feltsman	CBS Records	No	
1990	Elisabeth Leonskaja	Warner Classics	Yes	
1990	Maurizio Pollini	Deutsche Grammophon	Yes	
1991	Jenő Jandó	Naxos	Yes	
1991	Krystian Zimerman	Deutsche Grammophon	Yes	
1992	Alfred Brendel	Decca	No	
1992	Ivo Pogorelić	Deutsche Grammophon	Yes	
1993	Emanuel Ax	Sony Classical	No	
1998	Mikhail Pletnev	Deutsche Grammophon	No	
2003	Paul Lewis	Harmonia Mundi	No	
2003	Yundi	Deutsche Grammophon	No	
2004	Arnaldo Cohen	BIS Records	Yes	
2006	David Fray	ATMA Classique	No	
2006	Tamás Vásáry	Hungaroton	No	
2008	Yuja Wang	Deutsche Grammophon	No	X
2009	Yuja Wang	Deutsche Grammophon	No	
2010	İdil Biret	Idil Biret Archive	Yes	
2010	Hélène Grimaud	Deutsche Grammophon	Yes	
2011	Khatia Buniatishvili	Sony Classical	No	
2011	Marc-André Hamelin	Hyperion	No	
2012	Sophia Agranovich	Armonioso	No	
2013	Daniil Trifonov	Deutsche Grammophon	No	X
2016	Nicholas Angelich	Erato	No	
2020	Seong-Jin Cho	Deutsche Grammophon	No	
2021	Benjamin Grosvenor	Decca	No	
2021	Kenneth Hamilton	Prima Facie	Yes	
2022	Enrique Graf		Yes	X
2023	Igor Levit	Sony Classical	No	
2025	Paolo Ceccarini	Halidon	Yes	
2025	Lise de la Salle	Naïve	No	
2026	Dmitry Demyashkin	Line-In Spatial Records	Yes	

== Sources ==
- Brown, David (2003). "The B minor Sonata Revisited: Deciphering Liszt". The Musical Times. 144 (1882): 6–15. doi:10.2307/1004702. JSTOR 1004702.
- Hamilton, Kenneth (August 1996). Liszt: Sonata in B minor (1st ed.). Cambridge University Press. doi:10.1017/cbo9780511620133. ISBN 978-0-521-46963-0.
- Longyear, R. M. (1973). "Liszt's B minor Sonata, Precedents for a structural Analysis". The Music Review. 34 (3): 198–209.
- Newman, William S. (1972). The sonata since Beethoven. A history of the sonata idea (2nd ed.). New York: Norton. ISBN 978-0-393-95290-2.
- Ott, Bertrand (December 1981). "An interpretation of Liszt's Sonata in B minor". Journal of the American Liszt Society. 10: 30–38.
- Pesce, Dolores; Eckhardt, Maria; Mueller, Rena Charnin (24 April 2023). "Liszt, Franz [Ferenc]". Grove Music Online (8th ed.). Oxford University Press. doi:10.1093/gmo/9781561592630.article.48265. ISBN 978-1-56159-263-0. (subscription, Wikilibrary access, or UK public library membership required)
- Raabe, Peter (1931). Franz Liszt: Leben und Schaffen. Vol. 2. pp. 59–62.
- Rosen, Charles (1995). The Romantic Generation. Cambridge, Massachusetts: Harvard University Press. ISBN 978-0-674-77933-4.
- Schmidt-Beste, Thomas (2011). The Sonata. Cambridge Introductions to Music (1 ed.). Cambridge University Press. doi:10.1017/cbo9780511974298. ISBN 978-0-521-75631-0.
- Searle, Humphrey (1985). "Franz Liszt". The New Grove: Early Romantic Masters 1: Chopin, Schumann, Liszt. The Composer Biography Series (1st ed.). New York: Norton. p. 275. ISBN 978-0-393-01691-8.
- Szász, Tibor (1984). "Liszt's Symbols for the Divine and Diabolical: Their Revelation of a Program in the B minor Sonata". Journal of the American Liszt Society. 15: 39–95.
- Walker, Alan (1989). Franz Liszt: The Weimar years, 1848-1861. Ithaca, New York: Cornell University Press. ISBN 978-0801497216.
- Whitelaw, Bryan (October 2016). Franz Liszt's Piano Sonata in B minor: Context, Analysis and Hermeneutics (Master of Philosophy thesis). Belfast: Queen's University Belfast. OCLC 1179460949.
- Winklhofer, Sharon (1980). Liszt's Sonata in B Minor: a study of autograph sources and documents. Studies in musicology. Ann Arbor, Michigan: UMI Research Press. ISBN 978-0-8357-1119-7.
- Young, John Bell (2009). Liszt: a listener's guide to his piano works. Unlocking the Masters. New York: Amadeus Press. ISBN 978-1-57467-170-4. OCLC 244058500.
