= Argument (literature) =

Brief summary in literature

An argument in literature is a brief summary, often in prose, of a poem or section of a poem or other work. It is often appended to the beginning of each chapter, book, or canto. They were common during the Renaissance as a way to orient a reader within a large work.

John Milton included arguments for each of the twelve books of the second edition of Paradise Lost, published in 1674 (the original ten-book edition of 1667 did not include them). They present a concise but often simplified account of what happens in the book, though they seem not to be intended to have interpretive value, and they have been only sporadically referenced by critics. The first begins:

This first Book proposes, first in brief, the whole Subject, Mans disobedience, and the loss thereupon of Paradise wherein he was plac't: Then touches the prime cause of his fall, the Serpent, or rather Satan in the Serpent; who revolting from God, and drawing to his side many Legions of Angels, was by the command of God driven out of Heaven with all his Crew into the great Deep.

The argument could also be in verse, as in Ludovico Ariosto's Orlando Furioso or William Blake's The Marriage of Heaven and Hell. Most arguments included in poems are written by the authors themselves, but in other cases they could be added subsequently by a printer or publisher to an earlier work.

An example of modern literature using this technique is Vikram Seth's A Suitable Boy (1993), where each of the 19 sections are described by a rhyming couplet on the table of contents.
