= Stradella (Franck) =

Opera by César Franck

- Opera by César Franck
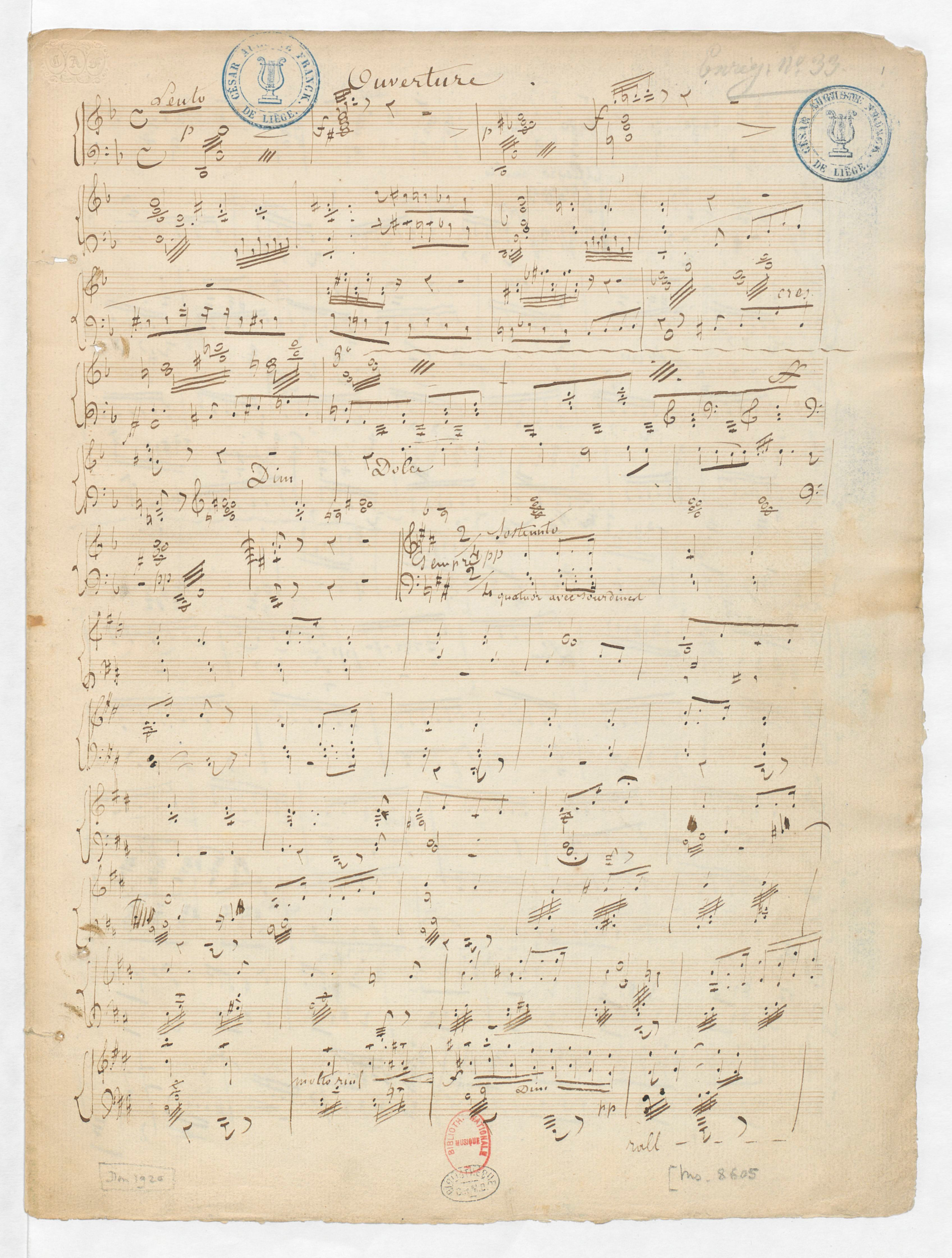
- First page of the manuscript of the opera
- Librettist: Émile Deschamps, Émilien Pacini
- Language: French
- Premiere: Monte Carlo

Stradella, CFF 229, Op.033 is an 1841 opera by César Franck to a libretto by Émile Deschamps and Émilien Pacini. It is the first of Franck's four operas. Written when he was only 19, it was never orchestrated. Its first performance took place in the late 20th century.

== Background ==
In 1830s Europe rediscovered music by Alessandro Stradella, and his life turned to be fascinating enough to become a subject for operatic treatment. Two most important operas about him were Stradella by Louis Niedermeyer (1837) and Alessandro Stradella by Friedrich von Flotow (1844). Both were premiered in Paris in 1837, in space of just one month: Flotow's opera was a one-act comédie en vaudeville (he expanded it into a full-length composition only seven years later) and Niedermeyer's was a five-act traditional grand opéra. The last was revived in a 3-act version in 1840.

The young César Franck chose for his very first try in the opera genre the same libretto as Niedermeyer, that is the one by Émile Deschamps and Émilien Pacini, but he completely omits the last two acts. Stradella was probably composed between 1841 and 1842 and may be the result of Franck's experiences as accompanist to the Italian tenor Mario Bordogni.

The opera was left as a vocal score, preserved in a manuscript at the Bibliothèque nationale de France. It was orchestrated by Luc van Hove and staged for the first time at the Opéra Royal de Wallonie on 19 September 2012. This production was recorded by Dynamic label and issued either on CDs (audio) or on a DVD (video).

== Roles ==
Role	Voice type	Cast for the 2012 DVD recording
Léonor	soprano	Isabelle Kabatu
Beppo		Patrick Mignon
Stradella	tenor	Marc Laho
Pietro	tenor	Xavier Rouillon
Michael	tenor	Giovanni Iovino
Spadoni		Werner Van Mechelen
Duke of Pesaro	bass	Philippe Rouillon
An officer		Roger Joakim

== Synopsis ==
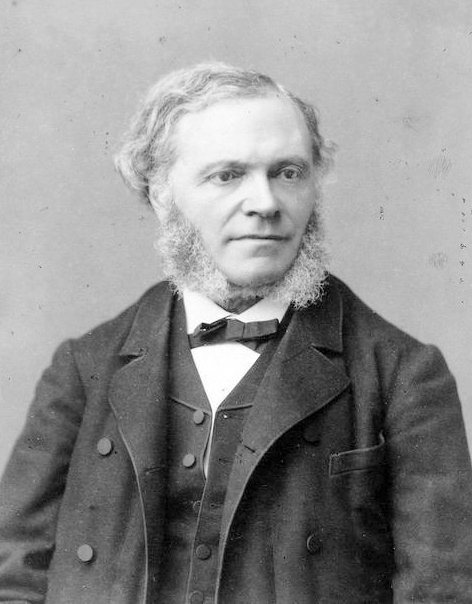
César Franck

Act I. The opera takes place in Venice at the age of Alessandro Stradella. The Duke of Pesaro enters with Spadoni and his men to abduct the beautiful Léonor (scene I). However they are disturbed by the singer Stradella and his pupils who came to sing for Léonor (scene II). Left alone Stradella sings together with his beloved, who stays at her balcony (scene III). After they part, Stradella returns with his henchmen and takes the girl away (scene IV). They are stopped by a patrol, but the Duke comes to save the cause (scene V). The bright carnival comes in, and Spadoni escapes the guards (scene VI).

Act II. Léonor finds herself at the Duke's apartments. She knows no one is going to save her, as she is an orphant (scene I). Spadoni appears with merchants, who bring precious presents from the Duke. She conseals herself (scene II). Called to make soften her heart with his singing, Stradella enters with Beppo and pupils. He tries some usual tunes, but soon finds that the girl in the room is no one else than Léonor (scene III). Stradella's attendants leave, and the lovers sing a desperate duet. In the middle of this a vocalise by Beppo is heard, which gives them an idea about how to escape together (scene IV). Unfortunately the Duke comes into the room. He tells the stunned Léonor about his love, while Stradella tries to keep himself still, singing only a parte. The girl rejects the Duke, and after he begins to threaten her, the singer comes out to tell the truth. Thanks to his pistol, the lovers manage to get out (Scene V).

Act III is set in Rome. The first tableau depicts a dining room in a hotel. After an aria sung by Stradella (scene I), enter two gangsters, Pietro and Michael. Spadoni, who is also here to find the runaways, asks them to kill Stradella. At first they refuse, but the gold makes them more agreeble (scene II). Léonor notices Spadoni as the three leave. This makes her much alarmed (scene III). The second tableau takes place in a church. It is the Holy Week. The people pray, while Stradella speaks with inspiration on sins and atonement. The killers attend the sermon too, and the words of the singer make them to decline the affair (scene IV). Enters the Duke and declares that he has forgiven Léonor and Stradella. The whole congregation praises the Lord (scene V).

== Structure ==
- Overture

Act I
Scene I
- Recitative (Spadoni, Duke) "Nous y voila Monseigneur"
- Choeur de bravi (male chorus, Duke, Spadoni) "Nos bras sont à vous"
Scene II
- Choeur d'élèves (female chorus) "Là du sommeil l'ange"
- Romance (Stradella; Léonor at the end) "Venise est encore au bal"
- [Choeurs d'élèves et de bravi] (mixed chorus) "Là du sommeil l'ange"
Scene III
- Recitative (Léonor, Stradella) "C'est donc vous, Stradella"
- Nocturne (Léonor, Stradella) "A demain les delices supremes"
Scene IV
- Recitative (Spadoni, Duke, Léonor offstage) "Amis, la place est libre!"
Scene V
- Choeur des sbires (male chorus, Officer, Spadoni, Duke) "Marchons serrés et faisons"
Scene VI — Final
- [Choeur] (Spadoni, Les masques [mixed chorus], Les sbires) "Ah parbleu, mes enfants"
Act II
Scene I
- [Introduction]
- Recitative (Léonor) "Ah! Ah quel songe affreux"
- Aria (Léonor) "Quand celui que j'adore"
Scene II
- Recitative (Spadoni) "Signora! Personne"
- Air avec choeur (Spadoni, Les marchandes [female chorus]) "C'est nous qui vendons"
Scene III
- [Scene] (Spadoni, Stradella, Beppo, Les élèves, Léonor offstage) "Ah, voilà ce chanteur"
Scene IV
- Duo (Léonor, Stradella, Beppo offstage) "Quel coup du ciel!"
- [Scene] (Léonor, Stradella, Beppo offstage; Duke at the end)
Scene V
- Recitative (Léonor, Stradella, Duke)
- [Trio and Finale] (Léonor, Stradella, Duke) "J’ai tout quitte"
Act III
Scene I
- [Introduction]
- Recitative (Stradella) "Ô Rome"
- [Air] (Stradella) "A l’heure, où Dieu meme"
Scene II
- Recitative (Spadoni) "J'y suis enfin"
- Trio (Pietro, Michael, Spadoni) "Voyez mes braves gens"
Scene III
- [Recitative and] Air (Léonor) "Spadoni, que vois-je"
Scene IV
- Prière du peuple (Léonor, Beppo, Stradella, Pietro, Michael, Peuple [mixed chorus]; Duke at the end) "O Dieu tout puissant"
Scene V
- [Finale] (all) "Allons, allons, enfants de Rome"

== Recording ==
- Stradella - opera in three acts (1841) Orchestra and Chorus of the Opéra Royal de Wallonie Paolo Arrivabeni rec. L'Opera de Liège, Belgium, 25–27 September 2012 DYNAMIC 2CD or DVD
