= Grande Symphonie funèbre et triomphale =

Symphony by Hector Berlioz

Grande symphonie funèbre et triomphale
- Symphony by Hector Berlioz
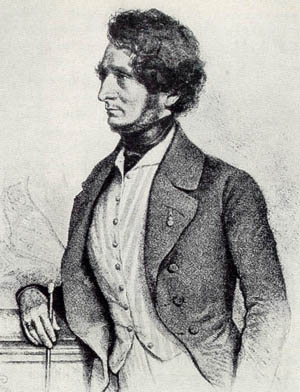
- 1845 engraving of Berlioz
- Catalogue: H. 80
- Opus: 15
- Occasion: 10th anniversary of the 1830 July Revolution
- Movements: three
- Scoring: military band, revised for also strings and chorus

Premiere
- Date: 28 July 1840
- Location: Paris

Grande symphonie funèbre et triomphale (English: Grand Funeral and Triumphal Symphony), Op. 15, is the fourth and last symphony by the French composer Hector Berlioz, first performed on 28 July 1840 in Paris. It is one of the earliest examples of a symphony composed for military band.

== Introduction ==
The French government commissioned the symphony for the celebrations marking the tenth anniversary of the July Revolution which had brought Louis-Philippe I to power, for which it was erecting the July Column in the Place de la Bastille. Berlioz had little sympathy for the régime, but welcomed the opportunity to write the work because the government had offered him 10,000 francs for it.

The Symphonie militaire (later renamed Symphonie funèbre et triomphale), rather than following the model Berlioz had established in Romeo and Juliet, represents a reversion to an earlier pre-Beethovenian style in the tradition of monumental French public ceremonial music. Berlioz claimed to have completed the entire score in just 40 hours, harvesting much of the musical material for this Grande symphonie funèbre et triomphale from unfinished works. The first movement, the "Marche funèbre", was constructed from the Fête musicale funèbre à la mémoire des hommes illustres de la France, a massive, seven-movement ceremonial piece begun in 1835 in the hopes of selling it to the French government. According to Julian Rushton, "Berlioz worked best on large projects; when he could see no future for them he preferred not to compose." He apparently abandoned the Fête musicale funèbre because he couldn't find a sponsor to commission it.

The Funereal and Triumphal Symphony was originally scored for a military band of 200 players marching in the procession accompanying the remains of those who had died fighting in the 1830 revolution on their way to reinterment beneath a memorial column erected on the site of the Bastille. On the day of the parade, little of the 3rd movement could be heard over the cheering crowds on the column when the ceremony was about to end as it was about to be reprised while the 1st and 3rd movements were heard during the procession and the 2nd during the dedication proper; but the work was such a success at the dress rehearsal that it was performed twice more in August and became one of the composer's most popular works during his lifetime.

Berlioz revised the score in January 1842, adding an optional part for strings and a final chorus to a text by Antony Deschamps. Richard Wagner attended a performance of this new version at the Salle Vivienne on 1 February 1842. On 5 February, he told Robert Schumann that he found passages in the last movement of Berlioz's symphony so "magnificent and sublime that they can never be surpassed."

== Composition of the symphony ==
The symphony is in three movements.

1. Marche funèbre (Funeral march). A slow, mournful march in F minor.
2. Oraison funèbre (Funeral oration) in G major
3. Apothéose (Apotheosis). A brilliant triumphal march in B♭ major, with an optional choral finale.

=== Lyrics ===
Berlioz commissioned Antony Deschamps in 1842 to provide lyrics to be sung by choirs at the end of the final (Apothéose) movement of the symphony.

Gloire!
Gloire! Gloire et triomphe!

Gloire!
Gloire et triomphe, à ces Héros!

Gloire!
Gloire et triomphe!
Venez, élus de l'autre vie!

Changez, nobles guerriers, tous vos lauriers,
Pour des palmes immortelles!
Suivez les Séraphins, soldats divins,
Dans les plaines éternelles!
À leurs chœurs infinis, soyez unis!
Anges radieux, harmonieux, brûlants comme eux,
Entrez, sublimes victimes!

Gloire et triomphe, à ces Héros!
Ils sont tombés aux champs de la Patrie!
Gloire et respect à leurs tombeaux!
Venez, élus de l'autre vie!

Gloire!
Gloire et triomphe, à ces Héros!
Gloire!
Et respect!
À leurs ...

Tombeaux!

Translation:

Glory!
Glory! Glory and triumph!

Glory!
Glory and triumph to these Heroes!

Glory!
Glory and triumph!
Come, chosen ones from the other life!

Change, noble warriors, all your laurels,
For immortal palms!
Follow the Seraphim, divine soldiers,
In the eternal plains!
To their infinite choirs, be united!
Radiant, harmonious angels, burning like them,
Enter, sublime victims!

Glory and triumph, to these Heroes!
They have fallen in the fields of the Fatherland!
Glory and respect to their graves!
Come, chosen ones from the other life!

Glory!
Glory and triumph, to these Heroes!
Glory!
And respect!
To their ...

Graves!

== Instrumentation ==
Berlioz scored the symphony for a large military band with optional choir, organ, and strings:

- 4 piccolos, 5 flutes, 5 oboes, 5 E♭ clarinets, 26 B♭clarinets, 2 bass clarinets, 8 bassoons, contrabassoon (optional)
- 12 French horns, 8 trumpets, 4 cornets, 10 trombones, bass trombone (optional), 6 ophicleides (or modern tubas)
- 8 snare drums, timpani (optional), 3 pairs of crash cymbals, bass drum, tam tam (gong), Turkish crescent, 3 tenor drums
- 200 choral singers, organ, and strings (20-20-15-15-10) (all optional)

In addition to the three trombones, a solo tenor trombone appears in the second movement. The choir, if used, only appears in the final movement. The strings, if used, only appear in their entirety in the final movement, with the cellos and basses also appearing in the first movement. An organ is also optional in the last movement.

== Recordings ==
- Hector Berlioz: The Complete Works (27 CD, Warner Classics 0190295614447, 2019, disc 5), Grande symphonie funèbre et triomphale (Op. 15; H 80B), Chorale Populaire de Paris; Musiciens des Gardiens de la Paix; conducted by Désiré Dondeyne (LP, Erato Records) 1959.
- Grande symphonie funèbre et triomphale (Op. 15; H 80B), Requiem : John Alldis Choir, London Symphony Orchestra, conducted by Sir Colin Davis (Philips 416 283-2) 1969 1970.
- Grande symphonie funèbre et triomphale (Op. 15; H 80B), "La Voie Triomphale": Staff Band of the Norwegian Armed Forces, conducted by Ole Kristian Ruud 2012.
- Grande symphonie funèbre et triomphale (Op. 15; H 80B), The Wallace Collection, conducted by John Wallace . CD Nimbus records 1989.
- Grande symphonie funèbre et triomphale (Op. 15; H 80B), Orchestre d'harmonie des gardiens de la paix de la Préfecture de Police de Paris, conducted by Philippe Ferro. CD Calliope 2003.
- Grande symphonie funèbre et triomphale (Op. 15; H 80B), Te Deum, Op. 22, Simon Preston, organ, The BBC National Orchestra of Wales, conducted by Thierry Fisher, Susanna Mälkki. CD BBC Music Magazine 2010.
