= David Giménez Carreras =

Spanish conductor (born 1964)

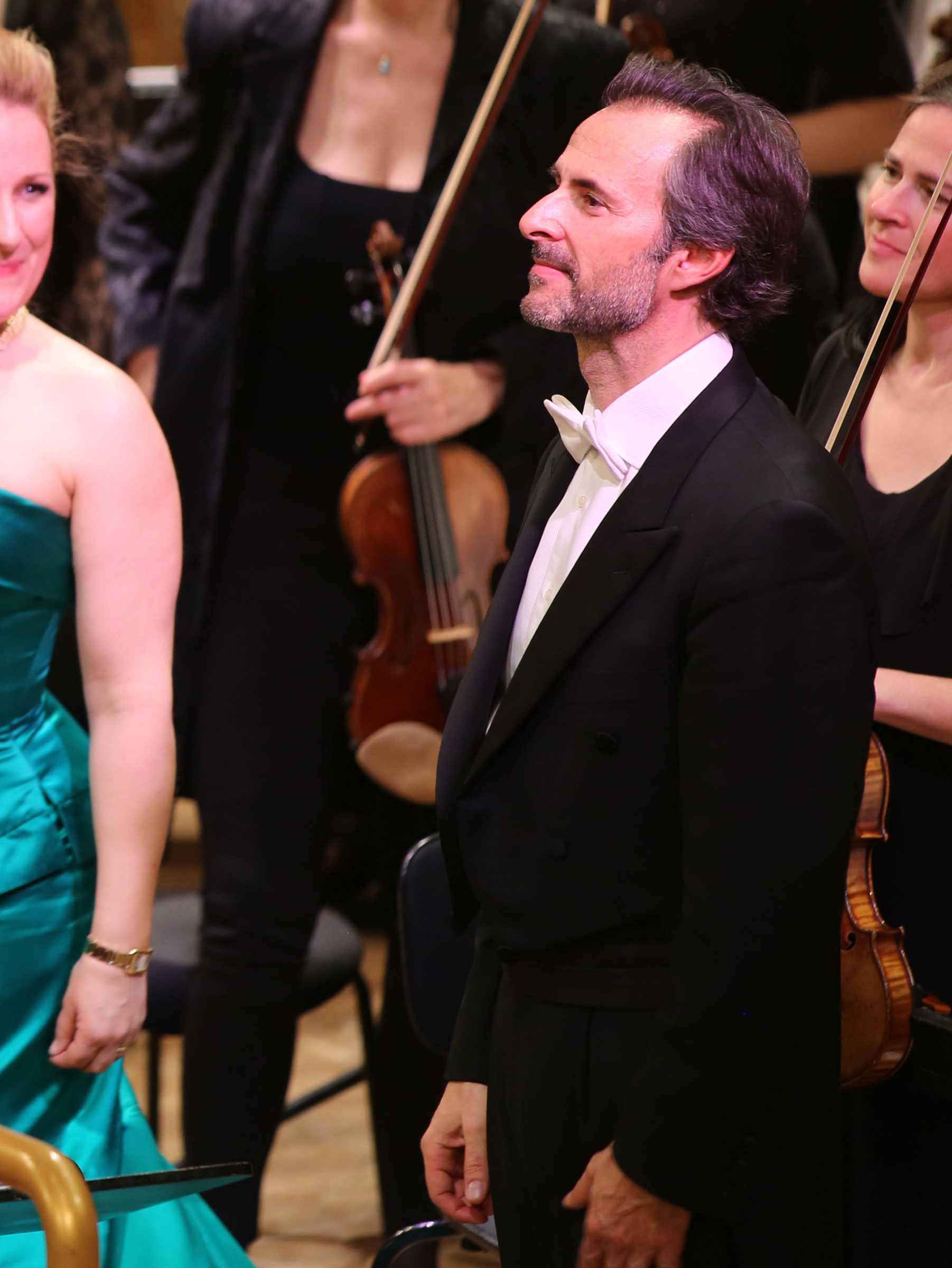

David Giménez Carreras (born in Barcelona in 1964) is a Spanish conductor. He is the Music Director of the Orquestra Simfònica del Vallès, and a principal guest conductor of the George Enescu Philharmonic Orchestra. Giménez Carreras is the nephew of tenor José Carreras and has conducted many of his concerts, including the 1998 outdoor concert in Barcelona attended by 50,000 people to mark the 10th anniversary of the José Carreras International Leukemia Foundation.

== Career ==
Giménez Carreras began his musical training at the Conservatori Superior de Música del Liceu in Barcelona. He then joined the Hochschule für Musik in Vienna, studying with Prof. Karl Osterreicher. He later studied for three years at the Royal Academy of Music in London, with Colin Metters and Sir Colin Davis. He made his professional debut as a conductor in 1994 in a concert given by José Carreras and has gone on to conduct concerts featuring many prominent opera singers including Montserrat Caballé, Agnes Baltsa, Plácido Domingo, Dennis O'Neill, Bryn Terfel, Angela Gheorghiu and Roberto Alagna. His debut at London's Royal Opera House came on 27 December 1999 when he conducted a concert by Alagna and Gheorghiu. He also conducted the couple's joint concert at the Théatre de l´Opéra in Monaco in 1997, and most recently Roberto Alagna's 2008 'Viva Verdi' concerts at the Auditorio Baluarte in Pamplona, the Théâtre des Champs-Elysées in Paris, and the Teatro Real in Madrid.

Giménez Carreras's debut as an opera conductor came in 1995 when he conducted Carmen at the Staatsoper Stuttgart, an opera he was later to conduct at the Hungarian State Opera House in Budapest (1996), the Macerata Opera Festival (2006), and the Festival Jardins del Cap Roig in Calella de Palafrugell (2007). On 4 June 2000 he made his debut at the Gran Teatre del Liceu conducting Ermanno Wolf-Ferrari's Sly in the Liceu's first ever performance of the opera. His other European opera performances have included Fedora, with Agnes Baltsa in the title role and Plácido Domingo and José Carreras alternating in the role of Count Loris Ipanov at Zurich Opera (1998); The Merry Widow (1998), Manon (2004) and Don Pasquale (2006) at the Festival de Ópera de Las Palmas; The Barber of Seville at the Opéra National de Bordeaux (2003); Rigoletto at the Teatro Principal de Mahon (2003); Aida at the Romanian National Opera, Bucharest (1999) and the Deutsche Oper Berlin (1999); Werther at the Festival Internacional de Santander (2004); La forza del destino at the Festival Terre Verdiane in Busseto (2004), and La bohème at the Teatro Real in Madrid (2006).

Further afield, he made his local debut in Israel in 2003, conducting Simon Boccanegra at the Israeli National Opera. He has also conducted in many major concert halls in China, Japan and Australasia, largely in performances by José Carreras, including the tenor's reprisal of the title role in Sly for Washington National Opera's Japan Tour in 2002. Giménez Carreras made his North American debut in 1994, conducting the Colorado Symphony Orchestra. Since then, he has conducted many of José Carreras' US concerts, as well as Montserrat Caballé's 1995 concert at the Ravinia Festival in Illinois. In addition to his concert work in the US, he has conducted Tosca (1999) and Madame Butterfly (2000) for Fort Worth Opera; Faust (2001) for Baltimore Opera; La bohème (2001) and L'elisir d'amore (2002) for Portland Opera; and Rigoletto (2003) for New Orleans Opera.

== Discography ==
- Montserrat Caballé, Montserrat Martí: Two Voices, One Heart, (Gran Teatre de Liceu Symphony Orchestra, David Giménez Carreras conductor), RCA Victor/BMG Classics, 1995.
- José Carreras: My Romance, (Tallis Chamber Choir, The London Musicians Orchestra, David Giménez Carreras conductor), Erato, 1997.
- Wolf-Ferrari: Sly, (José Carreras (tenor), Isabelle Kabatu (soprano), Sherrill Milnes (baritone), Orchestra and Chorus of the Gran Teatre de Liceu, David Giménez Carreras conductor), Koch Schwann, 2001.
- Por amor: Romanzas y dúos de zarzuela (María Gallego (soprano), José Bros (tenor), Orquesta de la Comunidad de Madrid, David Giménez Carreras conductor), Discmedi Blau, 2007.
