= Émilien Pacini =

French librettist (1811-1898)

Émilien Pacini (17 November 1811 in Paris – 23 November 1898 in Neuilly-sur-Seine) was a 19th-century French librettist of Italian origin.

He was the son of composer and music publisher Antonio Pacini and Jacqueline Rosier. His sister Eugénie Jeanne Pacini was the mother of Antony Choudens, composer and music publisher. Émilien Pacini worked in the administration of theaters and occupied the functions of theater censor at the Interior Ministry. A friend of Rossini, he wrote the lyrics of the cantata composed by the latter for the International Exposition (1867) in Paris.

== Works ==
He wrote the following librettos:

- 1837: Stradella, opera, in collaboration with Émile Deschamps, music by Louis Niedermeyer, Opéra Garnier, 3 March
- 1840: Loyse de Montfort, cantata, in collaboration with Émile Deschamps, music by François Bazin, Garnier, 7 October
- 1841: French version of Der Freischütz, music by Carl Maria von Weber, récitatifs by Hector Berlioz, Garnier, 7 June
- 1850: Les Deux princesses, opéra comique, music by Wilfrid d'Indy, January
- 1850: La Rédemption, mystère in 5 parts with prologue and épilogue, with Émile Deschamps, music by Giulio Alary, Théâtre-Italien, 14 April
- 1854: Cordélia, opera, in collaboration with Émile Deschamps, music by Séméladis, Versailles, April
- 1856: French version of Il trovatore, by Giuseppe Verdi (la Monnaie in Brussels, 20 May ; Garnier, 12 January 1857)
- 1859: La Perle de Frascati, opéra comique, music by Amédée de Roubin, Rouen, February
- 1860: Pierre de Médicis, opera, in collaboration with Jules-Henri Vernoy de Saint-Georges, music by Joseph Poniatowski, Salle Le Peletier, 9 March
- 1862: Erostrate, opéra, en collaboration avec Joseph Méry, music by Ernest Reyer (Bade, 21 August ; Garnier, 16 October 1871

== Bibliography ==
- Joël-Marie Fauquet (direction) (préf. Joël-Marie Fauquet), Dictionnaire de la Musique en France au XIXe siècle, Paris, Fayard, 2003, 1405 p. (ISBN 2-213-59316-7), (p.|927)
