= List of compositions by César Franck =

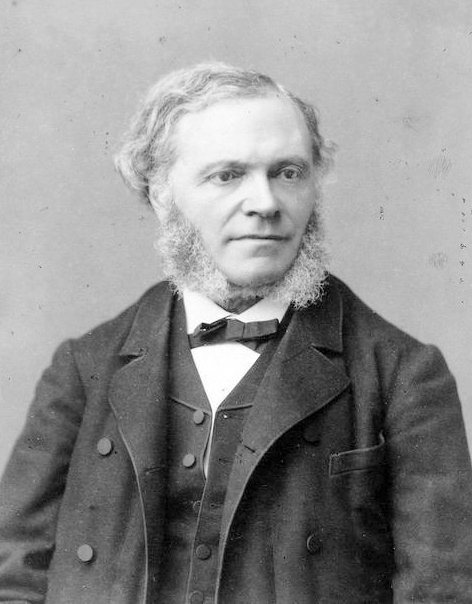
César Franck photographed by Pierre Petit, 1887.

Most of César Franck's works seem to have been published during his lifetime, although only 21 works received a publisher's opus number. The mature published works were catalogued by Wilhelm Mohr in his Franck Werke Verzeichnis (FWV). He divided Franck's compositions into two main groups: instrumental works, M.1-48, and vocal works, M.49-91, arranging them by genre, and by composition date order within each genre.

The CFF catalogue (see § External links) compiled by Joël-Marie Fauquet (published in 1999) details almost every known work by Franck, including many not listed by Mohr. In addition, many dates are listed in Fauquet's catalogue that are incorrect in Mohr's, or missing altogether.

In 2022, a critical 8-volume edition of the complete organ and harmonium works by Franck was published by Lyrebird Music, which follows the CFF catalogue and includes previously unpublished compositions.

== Juvenile works ==
Franck wrote a number of juvenile works between 1834-1837 to which he assigned an opus number; he later disowned these early works, except the Premiere Grande Fantaisie Op. 12 (1836), which he occasionally played in later life. These opus numbers are not to be confused with his mature published works, published with or without an opus number. Franck started the Opus numbering twice (as child prodigy, and again in the early 1840s). Fauquet proposed to write the earlier numbers with a prefixed 0 (e.g., Deuxième grand Concerto is marked Op. 011 instead of Op. 11).

- Op. 02 - Premier Concerto (piano and orchestra, 1834–1835) (Note: The work is lost as he purged it himself.)
- Op. 03 - Grand Rondo (piano, 1834)
- Op. 04 - Variations brillantes un thème original (piano, 1834), CFF 132
- Op. 05 - Variations brillantes sur un air du Pré aux Clercs (Hérold) (piano, 1834)
- Op. 06 - Grand Trio (piano, violin and violoncello, 1834), CFF 108
- Op. 08 - Variations brillantes sur la ronde favorite de Gustave III (par Auber) (piano and orchestra, 1835), CFF 133
- Op. 09 - O salutaris (choir and piano, 1835), CFF 188
- Op. 010 - Première grande Sonate (piano, 1835–1836), CFF 2
- Op. 011 - Deuxième grand Concerto (piano and orchestra, 1836), CFF 135
- Op. 012 - Première grande Fantaisie (piano, 1836)
- Op. 013 - Première grande Symphonie (orchestra, 1836) (Note: The work is probably lost; the symphony was premiered on 16 February 1841 at the Société d’Orléans.)
- Op. 014 - Deuxième grande Fantaisie (piano, 1836), CFF 4
- Op. 015 - Deux mélodies (piano, c. 1837), CFF 5
- Op. 016 – Trio (violin, viola and piano) (Note: The work is lost.)
- Op. 018 - Deuxième Sonate (piano, c. 1837)
- Op. 019 - Troisième grande Fantaisie (piano, c. 1837), CFF 7

== Compositions ==
=== Organ ===
- Grand Chœur (1846), CFF 49
- Pièce en La majeur (1854), CFF 51
- Andantino (1856), FWV 25 / CFF 54a
- Recueil de Noëls (c. 1860), CFF 249
- Six Pièces d'orgue (First edition 1868 / revised edition 1880):
  - Fantaisie, op. 16 (1863), FWV 28 / CFF 53
  - Grande Pièce Symphonique, op. 17 (1863), FWV 29 / CFF 98
  - Prélude, fugue et variation, op. 18 (1864), FWV 30 / CFF 30b
  - Pastorale, op. 19 (1863), FWV 31 / CFF 99
  - Prière, op. 20 (1860), FWV 32 / CFF 100
  - Final, op. 21 (1864), FWV 33 / CFF 101
- Petit Offertoire (ca. 1877), CFF 96b
- Trois Pièces (First edition 1883):
  - Fantaisie (1878), FWV 35 / CFF 102
  - Cantabile (1878), FWV 36 / CFF 103
  - Pièce Héroïque (1878), FWV 37 / CFF 104
- Petit Offertoire (c. 1885), CFF 38
- Trois Chorals (First edition 1892):
  - Choral I (1890), FWV 38 / CFF 105
  - Choral II (1890), FWV 39 / FF 106
  - Choral III (1890), FWV 40 / CFF 107
- Pièces posthumes pour harmonium ou orgue à pédales pour l'office ordinaire (First edition 1905):
  - Offertoire en Mi bémol (1858), FWV 24, 2 / CFF 36b
  - Grand Chœur en Ut (1858), FWV 24, 24 / CFF 56
  - Offertoire pour la Messe de minuit en Ré mineur (1858), FWV 24, 25 / CFF 57
  - Offertoire en Fa mineur (c. 1858), FWV 24, 1 / CFF 55
  - Magnificat en Ré (c. 1858), CFF 58
  - Grand Chœur en Ré (c. 1858), FWV 24, 4 / CFF 59
  - Andantino en Ré (c. 1858), FWV 24, 5 / CFF 60
  - Quasi Marcia en Ré mineur (c. 1858), FWV 24, 6 / CFF 61
  - Allegretto en Ré (c. 1858), FWV 24, 7 / CFF 62
  - Grand Chœur en Ré (c. 1858), CFF 63
  - Amen en Ré (c. 1858), FWV 24, 8 / CFF 64
  - Gloria Patri en Ré (c. 1858), CFF 65
  - Offertoire en La (c. 1858), FWV 24, 9 / CFF 33
  - Quasi lento en La (ca. 1858), FWV 24, 10 / CFF 66
  - Allegretto en Ut mineur (c. 1858), FWV 24, 11 / CFF 67
  - Andantino en Ut (c. 1858), CFF 68
  - Allegretto en Ré mineur (c. 1858), CFF 69
  - Allegretto non troppo en Ré (c. 1858), FWV 24, 12 / CFF 70
  - Magnificat en Mi bémol (c. 1858), CFF 71
  - Magnificat en Mi bémol (c. 1858), CFF 72
  - Grand Chœur en Mi bémol (c. 1858), FWV 24, 13 / CFF 73
  - Moderato con moto en Mi bémol (c. 1858), FWV 24, 14 / CFF 74
  - Andantino en Mi bémol (c. 1858), FWV 24, 15 / CFF 75
  - Allegretto non troppo en Mi bémol (c. 1858), CFF 76
  - Gloria Patri en Mi bémol (c. 1858), CFF 77
  - Gloria Patri en Mi bémol (c. 1858), CFF 78
  - Amen en Mi bémol (c. 1858), CFF 79
  - Gloria Patri en Mi bémol (c. 1858), CFF 80
  - Prélude pour l'Ave Maris Stella en Ré mineur (c. 1858), FWV 24, 16 / CFF 81
  - Prélude pour l'Ave Maris Stella en Ré (c. 1858), FWV 24, 17 / CFF 82
  - Prélude pour l'Ave Maris Stella en Ré mineur (c. 1858), FWV 24, 18 / CFF 83
  - Benedicamus en Do (c. 1858), CFF 84
  - Lento en Ré mineur (c. 1858), FWV 24, 19 / CFF 85
  - Kyrie de la Messe de Noël en Ut mineur (c. 1858), FWV 24, 21 / CFF 87
  - Moderato en Ut mineur (c. 1858), FWV 24, 22 / CFF 88
  - Moderato en Ut mineur (c. 1858), FWV 24, 23 / CFF 89
  - Grand Chœur en Ut mineur (c. 1858), CFF 90
  - Elevation en La (1859), FWV 24, 3 / CFF 93
  - Offertoire en Sol mineur (1859), FWV 24, 26 / CFF 92
  - Sortie en Ré (c. 1859), FWV 24, 27 / CFF 94
  - Trois Antiennes (c. 1859), FWV 27, 1–3 / CFF 91
  - Offertoire en Si (1860), FWV 24, 30 / CFF 95
  - Offertoire en Fa # mineur (1861), FWV 24, 28 / CFF 96a
  - Allegro Moderato en Ré bémol (c. 1863), FWV 24, 29 / CFF 97

=== Harmonium ===
- Cinq Pièces, (ca. 1864), FWV 26, 1–5 / CFF 32:
  - 1. Offertoire
  - 2. Petit Offertoire
  - 3. Verset 1
  - 4. Verset 2
  - 5. Communion
- Quasi Marcia, op. 22 (c. 1865), FWV 34 / CFF 35
- Offertoire sur un noël Breton (c. 1867), CFF 34
- Entrée (c. 1875), CFF 37
- Andante et Prière, (c. 1888), CFF 39bis
- L’Organiste, Recueil de Pièces pour orgue ou harmonium (First edition 1891):
  - Sept Pièces en Ut majeur et Ut mineur (1890), FWV 41, 1–7 / CFF 40
  - Sept Pièces en Ré bémol majeur et Ut # mineur (1890), FWV 41, 8–14 / CFF 41
  - Sept Pièces en Ré majeur et Ré mineur (pour le temps de noėl) (1890), FWV 41, 15–21 / CFF 42
  - Sept Pièces en Mi bémol majeur et Mi bémol mineur (1890), FWV 41, 22–28 / CFF 43
  - Sept Pièces en Mi majeur et Mi mineur (1890), FWV 41, 29–35 / CFF 44
  - Sept Pièces en Fa majeur et Fa mineur (1890), FWV 41, 36–42 / CFF 45
  - Sept Pièces en Fa # majeur et Fa # mineur (1890), FWV 41, 43–59 / CFF 46
  - Sept Pièces en Sol majeur et Sol mineur (1890), FWV 41, 50–56 / CFF 47
  - Sept Pièces en La bémol majeur et La bémol mineur (1890), FWV 41, 57–59 and FWV 42, 1–4 / CFF 48

=== Piano ===
- Eglogue, op. 3 (1842), FWV 11 / CFF 10
- Premier grand caprice, op. 5 (1843), FWV 13 / CFF 11
- Souvenirs d’Aix-la-Chapelle, op. 7 (1843), FWV 14 / CFF 12
- Prélude, Choral et Fugue (1884), FWV 21 / CFF 24
- Prélude, Aria et Final (1886–1887), FWV 23 / CFF 26

=== Chamber Music ===
- Grand trio, op. 6 (violin, cello and piano, 1834), CFF 108
- Trois Trios concertants, op. 1 (violin, cello and piano):
  - Trio (1841), FWV 1 / CFF 111
  - Trio ("Trio de salon", 1841), FWV 2 / CFF 112
  - Trio (1842), FWV 3 / CFF 113
- Trio concertant, op. 2 (violin, cello and piano, 1842), FWV 4 / CFF 114
- Duo, op. 14 (violin and piano, 1844), FWV 6 / CFF 117
- Quintet (Two violins, viola, cello and piano, 1879), FWV 7 / CFF 121
- Sonate (violin or cello and piano, 1886), FWV 8 / CFF 123
- Quatuor à cordes (1889), FWV 9 / CFF 124

=== Orchestra ===
- Ce qu’on entend sur la montagne (1845–1847), CFF 126
- Rédemption (1871–1874), FWV 52 / CFF 184
- Les Éolides (after a poem by Leconte de Lisle, 1876), FWV 43 / CFF 127
- Le chasseur maudit (1882), FWV 44 / CFF 128
- Les Djinns (piano and orchestra, after a poem by Victor Hugo, 1884), FWV 45 / CFF 136
- Variations symphoniques (piano and orchestra, 1885), FWV 46 / CFF 137
- Symphonie en ré mineur (1886–1888), FWV 48 / CFF 130
- Psyché (Soloists, choir and orchestra, 1887–1888), FWV 47 / CFF 129

=== Sacred Vocal Music ===
- Messe solennelle (1858), FWV 59 / CFF 202
- Messe, op. 12 (1860), FWV 61 / CFF 203
- Quare fremuerunt gentes (Offertoire pour la fête de Ste-Clothilde, 1871), FWV 74 / CFF 215
- Psalm 150 (1884), FWV 69 / CFF 221

=== Oratorios ===
- Ruth (biblical oratorio in three parts, 1843–1846), FWV 51 / CFF 179
- Les sept paroles du Christ en croix (1859), CFF 180
- Les Béatitudes (1869–1879), FWV 53 / CFF 185
- Rebecca (Biblical scene, 1881), FWV 54 / CFF 187

=== Operas ===
- Stradella (Opera in three acts, 1841), CFF 229
- Le Valet de ferme (Comic opera in three acts, 1851–1853), CFF 230
- Hulda (Opera in four acts und epilogue, 1882–1885), FWV 49 / CFF 231
- Ghiselle (Lyric drama in four acts, 1888–1890), FWV 50 / CFF 232

=== Songs ===
- L’émir de Bengador (c. 1843), CFF 139
- Le sylphe (1843), CFF 140
- Robin Gray (c. 1843), CFF 141
- L’ange et l’enfant (1846), CFF 142
- Souvenance (1846), CFF 143
- Les trois exilés (1848), CFF 146
- Aimer (1849), CFF 147
- Ninon (1851), CFF 148
- S’il est un charmant gazon (I, c. 1855), CFF 149
- S’il est un charmant gazon (II, 1857), CFF 150
- Passez, passez toujours (c. 1860), CFF 151
- Roses et papillons (c. 1860), CFF 152
- Le mariage des roses (c. 1870), CFF 153
- Paris (Patriotic ode for voice and orchestra, 1870), CFF 158
- Lied (c. 1873), CFF 154
- Le vase brisé (1879), CFF 155
- Nocturne (1885), CFF 156
- Pour les victimes (1887), FWV 86
- Les cloches du soir (1888), CFF 157
- La procession (1888), CFF 160
- Premier sourire de mai (1888), CFF 172
