= Luc Van Hove =

Belgian composer

Luc Van Hove (born 1957, Wilrijk, Belgium) is a Belgian composer of contemporary classical music.

== Biography ==
Luc Van Hove received his musical training at the Royal Conservatoire of Antwerp. He studied composition with Willem Kersters and music analysis with August Verbesselt. Afterwards he pursued advanced studies at the Mozarteum University of Salzburg (orchestral conducting) and at the University of Surrey. He has gained several awards, including the Sabam Prize for Contemporary Music (1993).

He is an honorary professor of composition and music analysis at Luca, School of Arts, campus Lemmensinstituut of Leuven and former professor of composition at the Royal Conservatoire of Antwerp, department of the Artesis Plantijn University College of Antwerp. He is also a former extraordinary professor at the Queen Elisabeth Music Chapel in Waterloo, member of the Royal Flemish Academy of Belgium for Sciences and the Arts (President of the Class of the Arts in 2011), and Commander in the Order of Leopold II.

Luc Van Hove received commissions from and was performed by numerous Belgian orchestras, ensembles and soloists, e.g. the Antwerp Symphony Orchestra, Flemish Radio Orchestra (Brussels Philharmonic Orchestra), Belgian National Orchestra, Beethoven Academie, Belgian cellist Roel Dieltiens, Ensemble Explorations, I Fiamminghi, Cultural Capital of Europe Antwerp 93, November Music, DeSingel in Antwerp, and pianist Levente Kende. His works were performed by international orchestras, ensembles and soloists, amongst which the Rotterdam Philharmonic Orchestra, Brodsky Quartet, Arditti Quartet, Xenakis Ensemble, Asko/ Schönberg Ensemble, Cappella Amsterdam, Cleveland Quartet, and cellist Pieter Wispelwey.

In 2008 his opera La Strada, based on the film by Federico Fellini, received its first performance in the Royal Flemish Opera of Antwerp (Belgium). In 2010 he wrote a symphonic adaptation of Stradella, a youth opera of César Franck. It had its world premiere in 2012, in the Opéra Royal de Wallonie.

== Musical style ==
Luc Van Hove's works include symphonic settings, chamber music, works for solo instruments, and choral works. In general, his oeuvre shows a preference for absolute and instrumental music, and interest in traditional genres such as the sonata, concerto, string quartet, and symphony. Traditional genres and forms are combined with modern techniques, and an interest in quickly evolving, dense textures. Composers such as György Ligeti, Béla Bartók, and Wítold Lutoslawski had a noticeable influence on his musical style. Techniques of variation and thematic development occupy a central role in his music. Typically, whole movements or even entire compositions are constructed out of the constant variation and thematic reworking of one limited pitch collection, which is stated at the beginning of a piece, creating a strong harmonic coherence. According to Van Hove, his "ultimate goal is to create exciting music, by building up logical and coherent networks of basically harmonic relationships, in which every second of the music can either point back or forth to other moments of the piece."

== Works ==
Vocal: Nacht-stilte voor gemengd koor op. 7 (1981); Twee liederen voor bariton en piano op. 8 (1981); Drie liederen voor sopraan en klarinettenkwartet op. 12 (1983); Trois Poèmes de Paul Verlaine voor sopraan, koor en kamerorkest op. 14 (1984); Four Sacred Songs op. 42 voor gemengd koor (2003); Psalm 22 (2-22) voor gemengd koor op. 44 (2004); La Strada: opera in twee bedrijven op. 45 (2007), orchestration of Stradella (2011): youth opera of César Franck; Cantico di Frate sole op. 51 (2014) (chamber choir and cello solo); Cantata opus 54 (2017) (choir and orchestra), Two War Songs op. 55 (2017) (bariton and piano quintet; also bariton and piano)

Orchestral: Largo per orchestra op. 13 (1984); Scherzo op. 16 (1985); Carnaval op het strand op. 17 (1985); Elise’s Dance voor orkest op. 21 (1987); Eerste Symfonie op. 25 (1989); Stacked Time. Concerto voor elektrische gitaar en orkest op. 26 (1990); Triptiek. Concerto voor hobo en orkest op. 29 (1993); Pianoconcerto I op. 32 (1995); Tweede Symfonie op. 34 (1997); Derde Symfonie op. 39 (2001); Diabelli Veränderung op. 43 (2004), La Sfida op. 47 (2010), Pianoconcerto II op. 48 (2010); Symphonic Music I op. 56 (2019) (parts I, II, III of symphony IV); Symphony IV op. 56 (2019)

Ensemble and Chamber Music: Trio op. 1 nr. 1 (1977); Klarinetkwintet op. 1 nr. 2 (1977); Vijf Preludiën op. 2 (1979); Divertimento voor slagwerkorkest op. 5 (1980); Prelude en toccata voor slagwerk en piano op. 6 (1981); Tema con variazioni voor ensemble van 13 instrumenten op. 9 (1981); Kwintet voor houtblazers op. 10 (1982); Sonatine voor piano op. 11 (1982); Three Guildford dances op. 19 (1986); Five inventions voor piano op. 20 (1987); Two pieces for three trumpets op. 22 (1988); Dansen voor vier handen op. 23 (1988); Septet op. 24 (1988); Sonate voor cello en piano op. 27 (1991); Aria voor cello op. 28 (1992); Strijkkwartet op. 30 (1994); Nonet op. 31 (1994); Strings op. 33 (1997) (string orchestra); Le vieux port de Marseille voor klarinet en piano op. 35 (1998); Kammerkonzert voor cello en ensemble op. 36 (1998); Klarinetkwintet op. 37 (1999); Modo perpetuo voor cello op. 38 (2000); Piano Quartet op. 40 (2002); Haydn-Veränderung op. 41 (for string quartet) (2003), Octet op. 46 (2009); Chamber Symphony op. 49 (2012) (for sinfonietta (15 instrumentalists)); Triptiek II voor viool en piano op. 50 (2013); Percussion Trio op. 52 (2015); Piano Trio op. 57 (2020); Triptiek op. 29 bis (2021) (oboe and piano); Tre Pezzi per Archi op. 58 (2021) (string orchestra)

Revisions: Divertimento op. 5 (revised) (2014); Triptiek. Concerto voor hobo en orkest op. 29 (revised) (2014); Pianoconcerto I op. 32 (revised) (2014); Kammerkonzert op. 36 (revised) (2015); Haydn Veränderung op. 41 (for string quartet) (revised) (2021); Triptiek. Concerto voor hobo en orkest op. 29 (revision II) (2022)

The following works have been published by Donemus: opus 50, 51, 52, 54, 55, 56 (both versions), 57, 29 bis, en 58. Soon to be published are Haydn Veränderung op. 41 (for string quartet) (revised) (2021) and Triptiek. Concerto voor hobo en orkest op. 29 (Revision II) (2022). All musical scores can also be borrowed from the library of the Royal Conservatoire of Antwerp.
