= Isabelle Kabatu =

Belgian operatic soprano (born 1970)

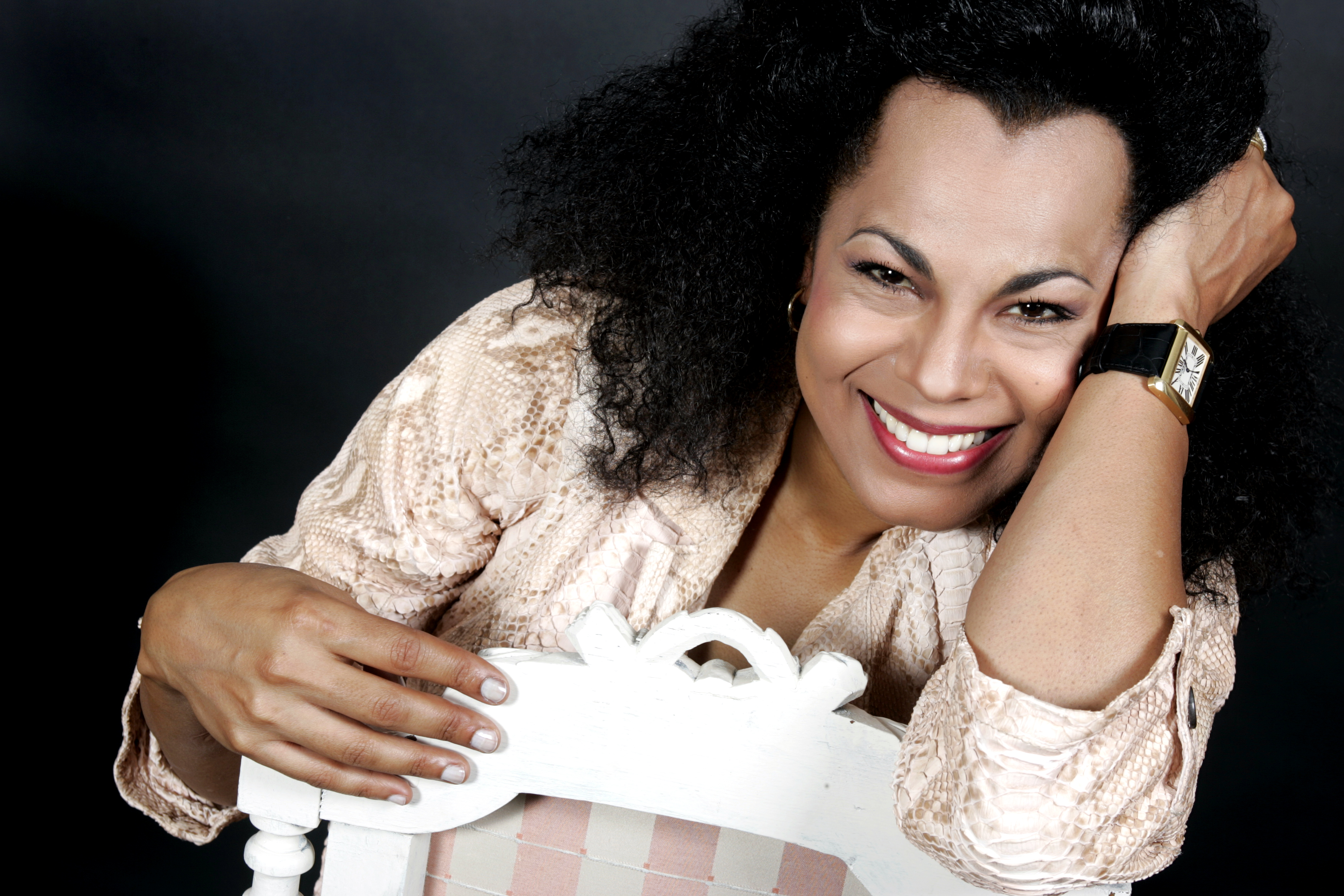
- Born: 1970 (age 54–55); Montignies-sur-Sambre, Belgium
- Education: Royal Conservatory of Mons; Royal Conservatory of Brussels; Conservatory of Nice
- Occupation: Operatic soprano
- Website: www.isabellekabatu.com

Isabelle Kabatu (born 1970) is a Belgian operatic soprano with a father from Belgian Congo and a Belgian mother. She has appeared internationally, with a focus on the Italian repertoire such as Verdi's La traviata and Aida, and Puccini's Manon Lescaut and Tosca. She appeared as Bess in Gershwin's Porgy and Bess beginning at the Houston Grand Opera and touring the world. In 2012, she appeared in the world premiere of Franck's early work Stradella.

== Life ==
Born in Montignies-sur-Sambre, Kabatu studied voice and at the Royal Conservatories of Belgium in Mons, Brussels and Ghent. She improved her skills with Jessye Norman.

She was a laureate of the Queen Elisabeth Competition in May 1992. Kabatu was ranked 12th out of 12 finalists, and two years later, in 1994, she won first prize in the Viotti Competition. That same year, she made her operatic debut in the title role of Verdi's La traviata in Lisbon.

Kabatu furthered her studies at the Conservatory of Nice with Jean-Pierre Blivet in 1995. In 1996, she appeared in a production of the Houston Grand Opera as Bess in a production of Gershwin's Porgy and Bess that toured to La Scala in Milan, the Opéra Bastille in Paris, and the Bunkamura of Tokyo.

At the Glimmerglass Festival in New York, she had a great success in the title role of Puccini's Madama Butterfly. Her roles also include Verdi's Aida, Amelia in Un ballo in maschera and Leonora in La forza del destino, Puccini's Tosca and Manon Lescaut, and Dolly in Ermanno Wolf-Ferrari's Sly, alongside José Carreras in the title role, in a production that was recorded.

In 1999, she married the director and painter Stefano Giuliani in Ixelles and in 2000 founded with him a lyrical workshop, "Da Tempesta Company", to help young artists musicians, singers, scenographers, decorators and visual artists. Since its creation, this workshop has produced about ten operas, often with orchestra.

Kabatu won the Prix des arts de la scène in Hainaut Province, Belgium, in 2003. She sang Aida in Rome in 2005 and there met the tenor Placido Domingo, with whom she often collaborated.

In 2008 she sang Chimène in the new production of Massenet's Le Cid at the Opernhaus Zürich alongside José Cura, supervised by Michel Plasson and Nicolas Joel, and in 2009 she performed the role of Madame Lidoine in Poulenc's Dialogues des Carmélites at the Théâtre du Capitole de Toulouse. In September 2012, she played the role of Léonor in the world premiere of Franck's Stradella at the Opéra Royal de Wallonie in Liège.

== Recordings ==
- Dolly in E. Wolf-Ferrari's Sly ovvero La leggenda del dormiente risvegliato, Munich, Koch International, 2001 (2 CDs, recorded in 2000), alongside José Carreras
- Aida, in Verdi's opera, conductor Fabio Mastrangelo
- Léonor in César Franck's Stradella, conductor Paolo Arrivabeni, direction Jaco Van Dormael, DVD label: Dynamic
- Carmen in Bizet's Carmen, Festival of Avenche
- Venus in Wagner's Tannhäuser conducted by Franz Welser-Möst, Zürich, 2004 (2 DVDs EMI, 180 minutes)
- Bess in Gershwin's Porgy and Bess, Munich, Sony Music Entertainment, 2009 (3 CDs and a leaflet, recorded in Graz, Helmut-List-Halle, Austria), conducted by Nikolaus Harnoncourt
