= Désiré Dondeyne =

- Born: Désiré Louis Corneille Dondeyne; 21 July 1921; Laon, Aisne, France
- Died: 12 February 2015 (aged 93)
- Genre: Classical
- Occupations: Conductor, Composer
- Instrument: Clarinet
- Years active: 1936–1986

Désiré Louis Corneille Dondeyne (21 July 1921 – 12 February 2015) was a French conductor, composer and teacher who was born in Laon in the Aisne département.

He studied music at the conservatory in Lille and beginning in 1936 at the Conservatoire de Paris. Dondeyne earned first prize in clarinet, chamber music, harmony, fugue, counterpoint and composition. From 1939 to 1953 he was the solo clarinet with the Musique de l’air (the French Air Force Band). From 1954-79, he was conductor of La Musique des Gardiens de la Paix (the Paris metropolitan police band).

Dondeyne expanded the works of the wind orchestra by his discoveries, his own compositions and with personal encouragement from other composers. The wind orchestra repertory was enriched with compositions from Jacques Castérède, Louis Durey, Gabriel Fauré, Jacques Ibert, Charles Koechlin, Darius Milhaud, Florent Schmitt, Germaine Tailleferre and Kurt Weill. With the Musique des Gardiens de la Paix he traveled throughout Europe and made over 100 recordings (including the famous Anthology of French Marches, produced by Jean-Marie Le Pen), and won several Grand Prix du Disques.

He was appointed in 1979 to the governing board of the French Ministry of Culture. He was the director of the conservatory of Issy-les-Moulineaux, a small suburb outside of Paris, from 1980 until 1986. Dondeyne also composed and arranged a large number of compositions from instrumental to symphonic.

Recordings with Dondeyne and the Musique des Gardiens de la Paix have been issued in the U.S. on the Calliope, Nonesuch Records and Westminster labels. Included in his recordings are two versions (band, and band with chorus) of Hector Berlioz's Grande symphonie funèbre et triomphale.

== Honours ==
Honours bestowed upon Dondeyne included his having been inducted as an honorary life member of the World Association for Bands and Ensembles (WASBE).

== Death ==
Dondeyne died on 12 February 2015, aged 93.

== Works ==
=== Concert Band Works ===
- 1964 -- Ouverture pour un festival
- 1964 -- Symphonia sacra
  1. Entree et Aspersion
  2. Litanies
  3. La Verité Salutaire
- 1968 -- Ballade pour une fête populaire
- 1968 -- Deux Danses
  1. Sarabande
  2. Pantomime
- 1968 -- Les Nichons: Fantaisie pour deux clarinettes et orchestre d'harmonie
- 1978 -- Nuances Pour Orchestre d'Harmonie - Divertissement sur un Thème de Fugue
  1. Prélude (Anches fluides)
  2. Adagio et Scherzetto (Cuivres doux)
- 1984 -- Petit symphonie landaise
  1. "As-Tu-Pédat"
  2. "Cassecan"
  3. Rondo final ("Lou Patissou" - "La Dacquoise")
- 1987 -- Trois Pièces caracteristiques
  1. Catalane
  2. Sérénade
  3. Valse
- 1992 -- In memoriam Igor Stravinsky
- 1992 -- Coup de vents
- 1994 -- Symphonie des souvenirs
- 1996 -- Caractères
  1. Air Tendre
  2. Air Tranquille
  3. Air Léger
  4. Air Martial
- 2004 -- Sevillana
- Cinq interludes en forme de danse
- Classic suite Fantaisie en 6 numéros pour orchestre d'harmonie
  1. Intrada
  2. Danse
  3. Choral
  4. Rigaudon
  5. Nocturne
  6. Cortège (Final)
- Concertino pour accordion solo et orchestre d'harmonie
- Concerto grosso pour euphonium ou baryton, percussions et harmonie de chambre
- Concerto lyrique pour alto-saxophone et orchestre d'harmonie
  1. Allegro - giocoso
  2. Lent
  3. Allegro - Scherzando
  4. Allegro vivo
- Divertimento pour tuba et orchestre d'harmonie
- Fanfanera pour orchestre d'fanfare
- Fantasie sentimentale
- Fortryssimo
- France en chansons (la) pour chœur et orchestre d'harmonie
- Fugue
- Jeux interdits
- Jubile et Marche
- Le Petit Quinquin
- Litanies pour un samedi saint
- Marche du fête
- Menuet
- Ouverture Ballet
- Ouverture fédérale
- Ouverture circonstancielle
- Pour un Siecle Nouveau...
- Sérénade
- Suite parodique
  1. Ouverture miniature
  2. Badinerie
  3. Charleston
  4. Marche
  5. Fanfare finale
- Symphonie No. 4
- Symphonie "Fidélité"
  1. 1er Mouvement
  2. 2e Mouvement
  3. 3e Mouvement
  4. Finale
- Symphonie des saisons
- Toccafuga - loca - Toccata
- Toccarina
- Variations sur la berceuse "Le Petit Quinquin"
- Variations sur un thème montagnard

=== Chamber works ===
- 3 Esquisses pour 2 cors, 3 trompettes, 3 trombones et tuba
- 3 Pièces N°2 des 9 Grands Duos pour 2 clarinettes
- 12 Déchiffrages für verschiedene Gruppen von Instrumenten
- Cantabile et Caprice pour trombone et piano
- Cérès pour saxophone et piano
- Choral et Variations sur le Nom de Tony Aubin pour quatuor de clarinettes
- Concertino pour clarinette et piano
- Concerto lyrique pour saxophone et piano
- Double-Fugue pour quatuor de clarinettes
- Double Fugue N°3 des 9 Grands Duos pour 2 clarinettes
- Io pour flûte ou hautbois et piano
- Jupiter pour trompette et piano
- Légende N°9 des 9 Grands Duos pour 2 clarinettes
- Lune pour trompette et piano
- Mars pour trompette et piano
- Mercure pour saxophone et piano
- Musique pour Cuivres pour 2 trompettes, tor, trombone, tuba
- Neptune pour clarinette et piano
- Ouverture N°1 des 9 Grands Duos pour 2 clarinettes
- Pallas pour cor et piano
- Pastorale N°4 des 9 Grands Duos pour 2 clarinettes
- Petite Musique de Cuivres No. 1 pour 2 trompettes, cor, trombone, tuba
- Petite Musique de Cuivres No. 2 pour 2 trompettes, cor, trombone, tuba
- Petite Suite Pastorale pour 4 clarinettes en sib et clarinette basse
- Pluton pour saxophone et piano
- Pour Se Distraire pour 4 bassons
- Pour Se Divertir pour 3 bassons
- Prélude pour basson ou violoncelle et piano
- Préludes N°7 des 9 Grands Duos pour 2 clarinettes
- Presto pour 4 clarinettes
- Ritournelle pour clarinette et piano
- Romance pour clarinette et piano
- Saturn pour saxophone et piano
- Soleil pour clarinette et piano
- Sonatina pour clarinette et piano
- Sonatine In C pour saxhorn basse (tuba) et piano
- Style Fugue N°6 des 9 Grands Duos pour 2 clarinettes
- Suite d'Airs Populaires pour hautbois, clarinette et basson
- Suite pour quatuor de Trombones (1949)
- Suite Tocellane pour clarinette et piano
- Symphonie des Clarinettes pour 6 clarinettes
- Terre pour trombone et piano
- Triptyque pour clarinette et piano
- Tryptique pour harpe solo et sextuor (flûte, hautbois, clarinette, cor, basson, contrabasse)
- Trois vocalises pour hautbois et piano
- Tubissimo pour saxhorn basse en sib ou euphonium ou ophicléide en sib et piano
- Uranus pour trombone et piano
- Variations N°8 des 9 Grands Duos pour 2 clarinettes
- Véga pour trombone et piano
- Vénus pour clarinette et piano
- Vesta pour clarinette et piano
- Voyages Imaginaires pour saxophone et piano, ou 2 violons et harpe, ou piano et violoncelle

=== Accordion Work ===
- Suite Brève für Akkordeon solo

=== Pedagogical works ===
- La Pédagogie des Ensembles de Clarinettes
  1. Volume 1: Pour les débutants pour 4 clarinettes
  2. Volume 2: Choral pour 6 clarinettes
  3. Volume 3: Gavotte pour 4 clarinettes
  4. Volume 4: Prélude inaltéré pour 5 clarinettes
  5. Volume 5: Comme une barcarolle pour 4 clarinettes
  6. Volume 6: Petite fugue pour 2 clarinettes
  7. Volume 7: Menuet pour 4 clarinettes
  8. Volume 8: Marche promenade pour 6 clarinettes
  9. Volume 9: Rhapsodie pour 5 clarinettes

== Sources ==
- Rehrig, William F. Heritage Encyclopedia of Band Music. Waterville, Ohio: Integrity Press, 1991 and 1996; ISBN 9780918048080
- Stoneham, Marshall. Wind Ensemble Sourcebook and Biographical Guide. Westport, Conn.: Greenwood Press, 1997; ISBN 9780313298585
