= La Musique des Gardiens de la Paix =

The Band of the Paris Prefecture of Police (La Musique des Gardiens de la Paix) dates its creation from an order of the Prefect of Police (Préfet de Police) Jean Chiappe on March 31, 1929.

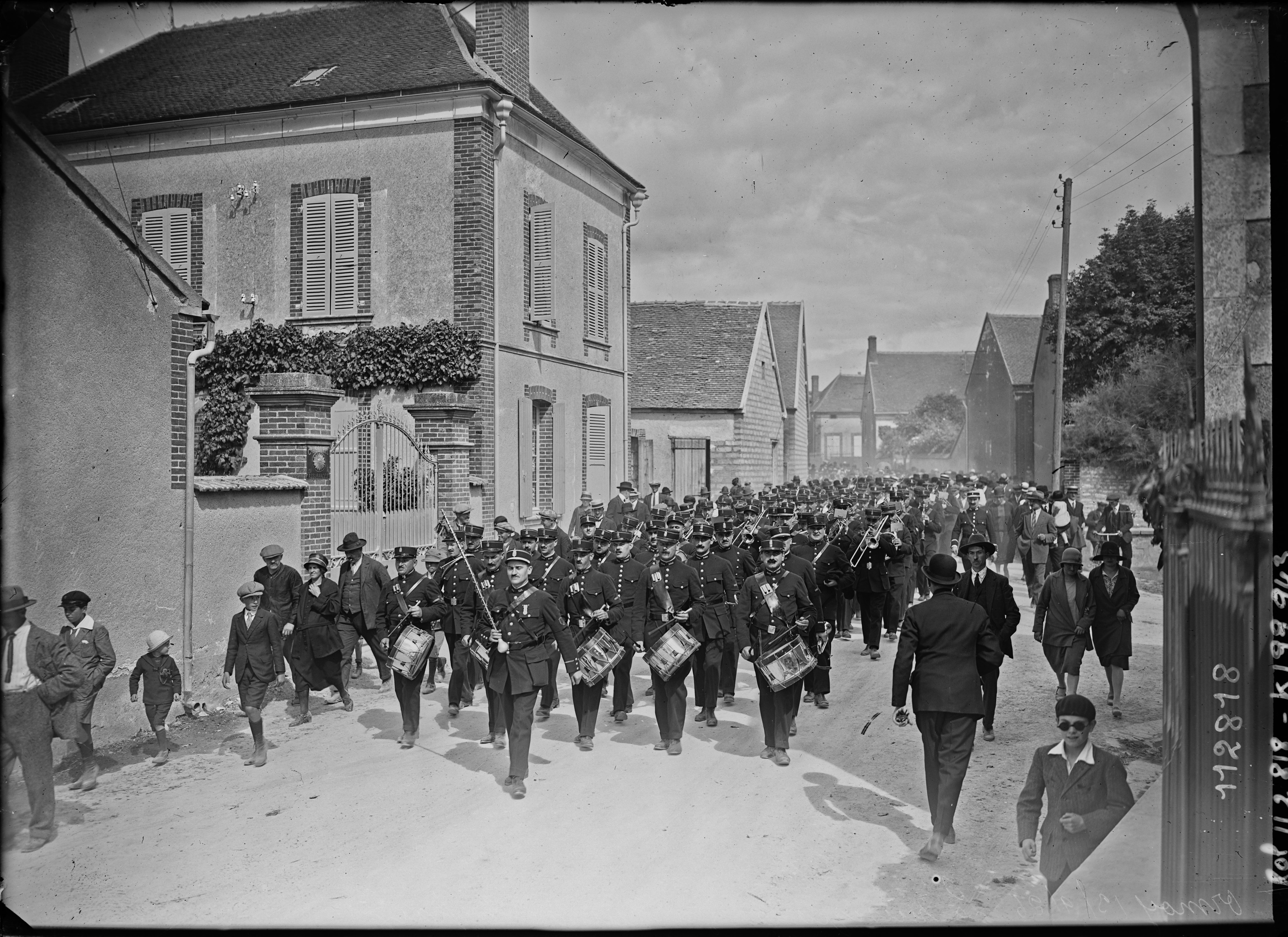
The band at Ormoy in 1926

Earlier origins consist of outdoor groups during the French Revolution and later which performed as "Gardes Françaises" during civic occasions. Composers Charles Simon Catel (1773–1830) and François-Joseph Gossec (1734–1829) are considered the godfathers of the band. The band can also take its origins back to 1800, the beginnings of the Préfecture de Police of Paris. The Code Napoleon of the time called for a drum roll to announce the police commissioner’s warning that weapons might be necessary during disturbances. A predecessor band was the "7th Arrondissement Musical Union" formed in 1919 by a Sergeant Martin. This gathered musicians from two Arrondissements of Paris, the 18th and 19th.

La Musique des Gardiens de la Paix from 1929 was conducted by Jules Bleu and Denis Roussel.

The band was dissolved in 1942 during the occupation. A resistance network organized by the band was headed by Andre Houillier (bass clarinet). Three band members died in the resistance: George Provost (tuba), Philippe Chevrier (tuba) and Philippe Sitterlin (bugle). After the liberation of Paris, La Musique des Gardiens de la Paix performed the formerly banned national anthem La Marseillaise at the main courtyard of the prefecture of police on August 24, 1944.

Conductors from 1945-1999 have included Felix Coulibeuf, Désiré Dondeyne, Claude Pichaureau, François Boulanger, Louis Tillet, and Philippe Ferro.

The 122 musicians, as of 2015, offer over 100 concerts annually in the Paris area and abroad. Members are recruited from the national academies, and must be both musicians and policemen. The conductor since July 2014 is Gildas Harnois.

The band has released a large repertoire of music from three centuries on the Calliope, Club Français du Disque, Erato, Music Guild, Nonesuch, Teldec, and Westminster labels. Recordings have received prizes from the Académie Charles Cros and Académie du disque français.
