= Prélude, Aria et Final (Franck) =

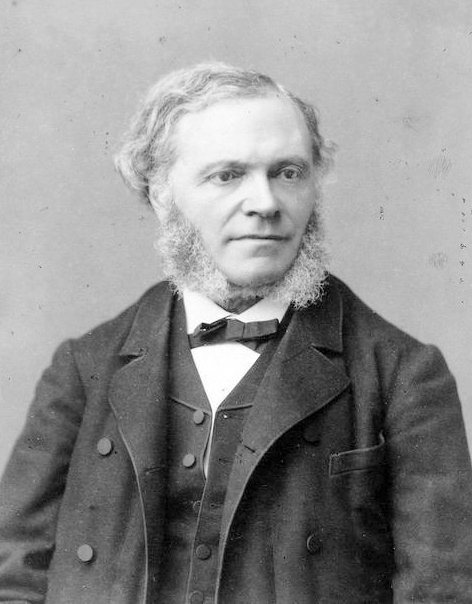
César Franck, photographed by Pierre Petit, 1887

Prélude, Aria et Final, Op. 23 is a work written in 1886–87 by the Belgian composer César Franck for solo piano.

== Structure ==
As the name implies, it comprises three movements: a prelude, an aria, and a final.

=== I. Prélude ===
With the tempo indication as Allegro moderato e maetoso, 4/4 (common) time, it begins with a half march-like character, with tension slowly building up and the flow of the music increasing. It is the only movement in this composition with a loud ending.

=== II. Aria ===
The mood of this slow movement is fantasy-like, gradually turning into a chorale with tension building up and the increasing music flowing progressing much like the first movement.

=== III. Final ===
The third movement begin with a fiery Allegro molto ed agitato in p with frequent and abrupt dynamic changes throughout most of the movement such as from pp to ff in measure 3. The flow of music is constant and restless but unlike the previous movements, the flow of music decreases in the bottom half near the ending. The restless character finally becomes gentle, fading away into a last tonic chord in ppp.
