= Arthur Schopenhauer's aesthetics =

- Schopenhauer claimed that art provides knowledge of eternal Platonic Ideas and also results in temporary relief from the pressures of willing.

Philosophical Context
- Tradition: German idealism
- Main interests: Aesthetics, Music

Key Concepts
- Notable ideas: Will as suffering; Hierarchy of the Arts; Music as direct Will
- Influences: Kant, Plato, Upanishads

Arthur Schopenhauer's aesthetics result from his philosophical doctrine of the primacy of the metaphysical Will as the Kantian thing-in-itself, the ground of life and all being. In his chief work, The World as Will and Representation, Schopenhauer thought that if consciousness or attention is fully engrossed, absorbed, or occupied with the world as painless representations or images, then there is no consciousness of the world as painful willing. Aesthetic contemplation of a work of art provides just such a state—a temporary liberation from the suffering that results from enslavement to the will [need, craving, urge, striving] by becoming a will-less spectator of "the world as representation" [mental image or idea]. Art, according to Schopenhauer, also provides essential knowledge of the world's objects in a way that is more profound than science or everyday experience.

Schopenhauer's aesthetic theory is introduced in Book 3 of The World as Will and Representation, Vol. 1, and developed in essays in the second volume. He provides an explanation of the beautiful (German: Schönheit) and the sublime (Das Erhabene), a hierarchy among the arts (from architecture, landscape gardening, sculpture and painting, poetry, etc. all the way to music, the pinnacle of the arts since it is a direct expression of the will), and the nature of artistic genius.

Schopenhauer's aesthetic philosophy influenced artists and thinkers including composers Richard Wagner and Arnold Schoenberg, philosopher Friedrich Nietzsche, and writers associated with the Symbolist movement (Charles Baudelaire, Paul Verlaine, Stéphane Mallarmé, etc.)

== An extension of his philosophy ==
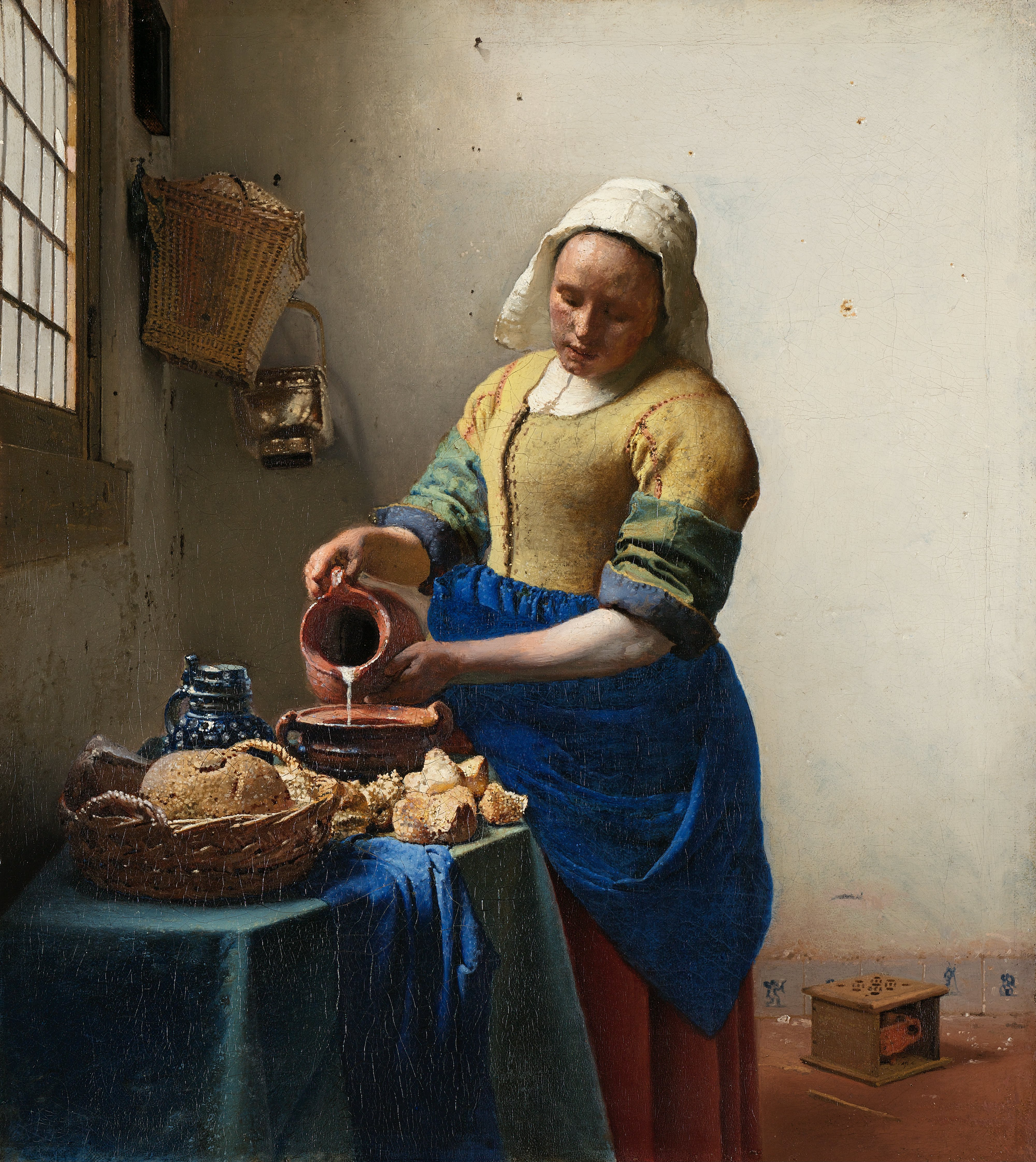
In his main work, Schopenhauer praised the Dutch Golden Age artists, who "directed such purely objective perception to the most insignificant objects, and set up a lasting monument of their objectivity and spiritual peace in paintings of still life. The aesthetic beholder does not contemplate this without emotion."

For Schopenhauer, the Will is an aimless desire to perpetuate itself, the basis of life. Desire engendered by the Will is the source of all the sorrow in the world; each satisfied desire leaves us either with boredom, or with some new desire to take its place. A world in thrall to Will is necessarily a world of suffering. Since the Will is the source of life, and our very bodies are stamped with its image and designed to serve its purpose, the human intellect is, in Schopenhauer's simile, like a lame man who can see, but who rides on the shoulders of a blind giant.

Schopenhauer's aesthetics is an attempt to break out of the pessimism that naturally comes from this world view. Schopenhauer believed that what distinguished aesthetic experiences from other experiences is that contemplation of the object of aesthetic appreciation temporarily allowed the subject a respite from the strife of desire, and allowed the subject to enter a realm of purely mental enjoyment, the world purely as representation or mental image. The more a person's mind is concerned with the world as representation, the less it feels the suffering of the world as will. Schopenhauer analysed art from its effects, both on the personality of the artist, and the personality of the viewer.

He believed that what gives arts such as literature and sculpture their value was the extent to which they incorporated pure perceptions. But, being concerned with human forms (at least in Schopenhauer's day) and human emotions, these art forms were inferior to music, which being a direct manifestation of will, was to Schopenhauer's mind the highest form of art. Schopenhauer's philosophy of music was influential in the works of Richard Wagner. Wagner was an enthusiastic reader of Schopenhauer, and recommended the reading of Schopenhauer to his friends. His published works on music theory changed over time, and became more aligned with Schopenhauer's thought, over the course of his life. Schopenhauer had stated that music was more important than libretto in opera. Music is, according to Schopenhauer, an immediate expression of will, the basic reality of the experienced world. Libretto is merely a linguistic representation of transient phenomena. Wagner emphasized music over libretto in his later works after reading Schopenhauer's aesthetic doctrine.

== The Schopenhauerian artistic genius ==
Schopenhauer believed that while all people were in thrall to the Will, the quality and intensity of their subjection differed:

Only through the pure contemplation . . . which becomes absorbed entirely in the object, are the Ideas comprehended; and the nature of genius consists precisely in the preëminent ability for such contemplation. . . . (T)his demands a complete forgetting of our own person.

The aesthetic experience temporarily emancipates the subject from the Will's domination and raises them to a level of pure perception. "On the occurrence of an aesthetic appreciation, the will thereby vanishes entirely from consciousness." Genuine art cannot be created by anyone who merely follows standard artistic rules. A genius is required, that is, a person who creates original art without concern for rules. The personality of the artist was also supposed to be less subject to Will than most: such a person was a Schopenhauerian genius, a person whose exceptional predominance of intellect over Will made them relatively aloof from earthly cares and concerns. The poet living in a garret, the absent-minded professor, Vincent van Gogh struggling with madness, are all (at least in the popular mind) examples of Schopenhauer's geniuses: so fixed on their art that they neglect the "business of life" that in Schopenhauer's mind meant only the domination of the evil and painful Will. For Schopenhauer, the relative lack of competence of the artist and the thinker for practical pursuits was no mere stereotype: it was cause and effect.

== Influence ==
In proposing that art could offer deliverance from the Will, Schopenhauer elevated art from mere artisanry or decoration, and held that art potentially offered temporary deliverance from the aimless strife of the Will in nature. In effect, Schopenhauer turned art into a substitute religion by offering a doctrine of salvation through aesthetic experiences. Artists were not merely skilled hands; they were priests or prophets of this doctrine. This teaching goes far to explain Schopenhauer's appeal to members of the creative communities over the second half of the nineteenth century. His doctrine of aesthetics justified artistic work as a matter of highest importance in human society.

Schopenhauer's aesthetics remain influential today, and are perhaps the most lasting part of his philosophy. Their appeal to later generations of Romantics, and to all schools of bohemianism, is demonstrated. Wagner sent Schopenhauer a note expressing deep gratitude for Schopenhauer's discussion of music. Schopenhauer's philosophy in general left a deep impression on a number of important writers, especially Thomas Hardy, Marcel Proust, Stéphane Mallarmé, Thomas Mann, Ivan Turgenev and Samuel Beckett.

Schopenhauer's aesthetics were directly responsible for the rise of the Symbolists and their allied movements, and to the general development of the concept of art for art's sake. It deeply influenced the aesthetics of Friedrich Nietzsche, although he ultimately rejected Schopenhauer's conception of Will as evil; Nietzsche's famous opposition of the Apollonian and Dionysian is a translation of Schopenhauer's opposition of intellect against will in terms of Greek mythology. When the Marxist critique of capitalism was stirred into the aesthetic stew, Schopenhauer's essentially ascetic view of the purpose of art laid the foundation for the opposition of kitsch versus the avant-garde which is found in such critics as Clement Greenberg. Contemporary beliefs that artistic creation should not be swayed by financial gains or the demands of patrons or customers, and the belief that the greatest artists are those who create new and entirely unprecedented forms of expression, rather than those who develop already existing forms, all owe a great deal to the influence of Schopenhauer.

Santayana praised Schopenhauer's doctrine that tragedy benefited audiences because it helped them to deny the will–to–live and to turn away from life. "He [Schopenhauer] thought tragedy beautiful because it detached us from a troubled world and did not think a troubled world good, as those unspeakable optimists did, because it made such a fine tragedy. It is pleasant to find that among all these philosophers one at least was a gentleman."

== Quotations ==
"...things are certainly beautiful to behold, but to be them is something quite different." (The World as Will and Representation, Vol. II, Ch. XLVI)

"...aesthetic pleasure in the beautiful consists, to a large extent, in the fact that, when we enter the state of pure contemplation, we are raised for the moment above all willing, above all desires and cares; we are, so to speak, rid of ourselves." (The World as Will and Representation, Vol. I, § 68)

"Perhaps the reason why common objects in still life seem so transfigured and generally everything painted appears in a supernatural light is that we then no longer look at things in the flux of time and in the connection of cause and effect .... On the contrary, we are snatched out of that eternal flux of all things and removed into a dead and silent eternity. In its individuality the thing itself was determined by time and by the [causal] conditions of the understanding; here we see this connection abolished and only the Platonic Idea is left." (Manuscript Remains, Vol. I, § 80)

== See also ==
- Die Meistersinger von Nürnberg
- Symbolism

== Bibliography ==
- Schopenhauer, Arthur, Parerga and Paralipomena, vol. 2, Oxford University Press ISBN 0-19-924221-6
- Schopenhauer, Arthur, The World as Will and Representation, Volume I, Third Book, Dover 1969, ISBN 0-486-21761-2
- Schopenhauer, Arthur, The World as Will and Representation, Volume II, Supplements to the Third Book, Dover 1969, ISBN 0-486-21762-0
- Neill, Alex and Janaway, Christopher, Better Consciousness: Schopenhauer's Philosophy of Value, Blackwell, 2009
