= Giulio Alary =

Italian composer (1814–1891)

Giulio Alary (sometimes Alari) (1814–1891) was an Italian composer. Born in Mantua, he was a student at the Milan Conservatory before relocating to Paris, where he died, in 1891. He wrote three operas, as well as some orchestral and chamber music, arias, and melodies. He also served as a conductor and singing teacher.

An excerpt from Le tre nozze, a polka with variations, is said to have been a particular favorite of Henriette Sontag.

== Operas ==
- 1840 – Rosmunda
- 1851 – Le tre nozze
- 1861 – La voix humaine
