= Antony Deschamps =

Writer and poet from France (1800–1869)

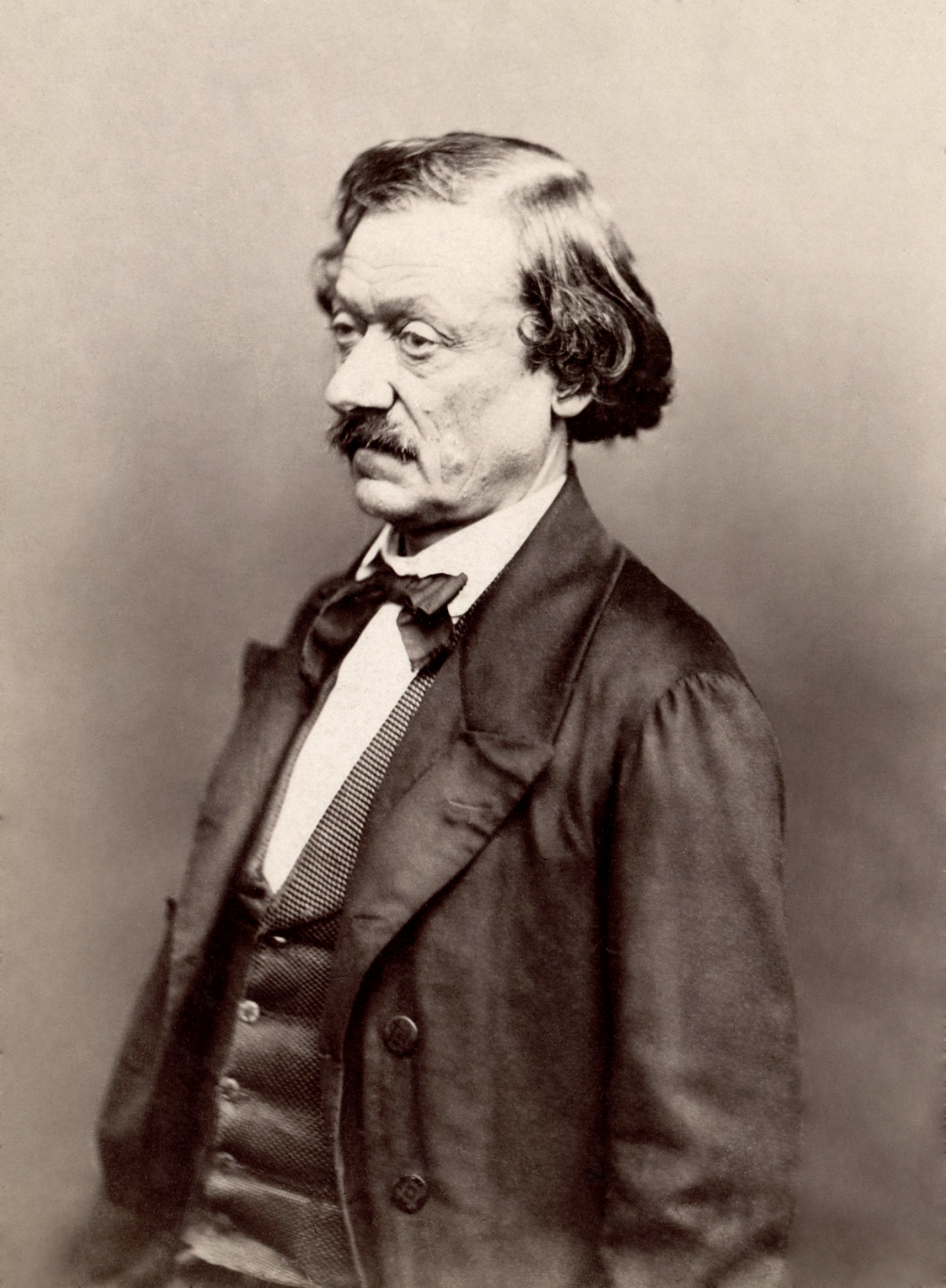
- Born: 12 March 1800; Paris
- Died: 28 October 1869 (aged 69); Passy
- Occupation: Poet

Antoine-François-Marie Deschamps Saint Amand, known as Antony Deschamps and Antoni Deschamps (12 March 1800 – 28 October 1869) was a French poet.

Antony Deschamps was born in Paris, and was the brother of one of the first representatives of the Romantic movement, Émile Deschamps, on whom he had some literary influence. He himself wrote some poems, especially political satires, published in 1831. His partial verse translation of the Divine Comedy of Dante, published in 1829, earned him some fame.

His poems Dernières Paroles and Résignation were republished with his brother’s in 1841. He also worked with his friend Hector Berlioz, and died the same year as him.

== Works ==
- La Divine Comédie de Dante Alighieri, translated into French verse
- Trois satires politiques, preceded by a prologue, 1831
- Dernières paroles, poems, 1835
- Résignation, poems, 1839
- Poésies de Émile et Antoni Deschamps, 1841
- La Jeune Italie, 1844
