= Émile Deschamps =

French poet (1791–1871)

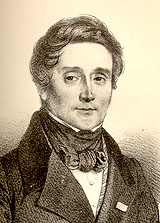
- Born: 20 February 1791; Bourges, Kingdom of France
- Died: 23 April 1871 (aged 80); Versailles, France
- Occupation: Poet

Signature
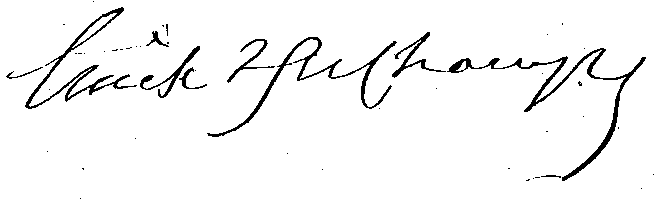

Émile de Saint-Amand Deschamps (French: [emil də sɛ̃t‿amɑ̃ deʃɑ̃]; 20 February 1791 – 23 April 1871) was a French poet. He was born at Bourges. The son of a civil servant, he adopted his father's career, but as early as 1812 he distinguished himself by an ode, La Paix conquise, which won the praise of Napoleon. In 1818 he collaborated with Henri de Latouche in two verse comedies, Selmours de Florian and Le Tour de faveur.

Deschamps and his brother Antoine François Marie were among the most enthusiastic disciples of the Victor Hugo, and Deschamps was one of the chiefs of the Romantic school. To further the cause of romanticism he founded with Victor Hugo La Muse Française (1824), a journal to which he contributed verses and stories signed "Le Jeune Moraliste." Four years afterward he collected and published Etudes française et étrangères (1828), consisting of poems and translations. He published La paix conquise (1812), an ode which won the praise of Napoleon; Contes physiologiques (1854); and Réalités fantastiques (1854). His Œuvres Complètes were published in six volumes (1872–74).

He wrote the text for the choral symphony Roméo et Juliette composed by Hector Berlioz in 1839. He also collaborated with Giacomo Meyerbeer and Eugène Scribe on the libretti of Les Huguenots (1836) and Le prophète (1849).

== See also ==
- Synchronicity
