= Opéra Royal de Wallonie =

Opera house in Liège, Belgium

- The Opéra royal de Wallonie in Liège
- Interactive map of Opéra Royal de Wallonie
- Former names: Théâtre royal de Liège
- Address: Place de l'Opéra
- Location: B-4000 Liège, Belgium
- Coordinates: 50°38′36″N 5°34′13″E
- Capacity: 1,044
- Type: Opera house

Construction
- Opened: 4 November 1820
- Renovated: 2009–2012
- Architects: Auguste Duckers, Julien-Étienne Rémont

Website
- Official website

The Opéra Royal de Wallonie (French pronunciation: [ɔpeʁa ʁwajal də walɔni], lit. 'Royal Opera of Wallonia') is an opera house located on the Place de l'Opéra, in Liège, Belgium. Together with La Monnaie and the Vlaamse Opera, the Opéra royal, as it is colloquially known, is one of the three major opera houses in Belgium. From the beginning, the institution occupied the Théâtre royal in Liège, a building loaned by the city (inaugurated on 4 November 1820).

== History ==
=== Early history ===
In 1816, King William I of the Netherlands transferred the land and materials of the former Dominican convent to the city of Liège, on condition that a theatre be built there.

The first stone was laid on 1 July 1818 by Mademoiselle Mars. Built according to the plan of the architect Auguste Dukers, the theatre in the neoclassical style has a massive parallelepipedic shape. Its main façade is decorated with a marble colonnade (Note: This colonnade comes from the former Chartreuse de Liège.) limited by a balustrade and overlooking the arcades on the ground floor. The Théâtre royal de Liège was inaugurated on 4 November 1820.

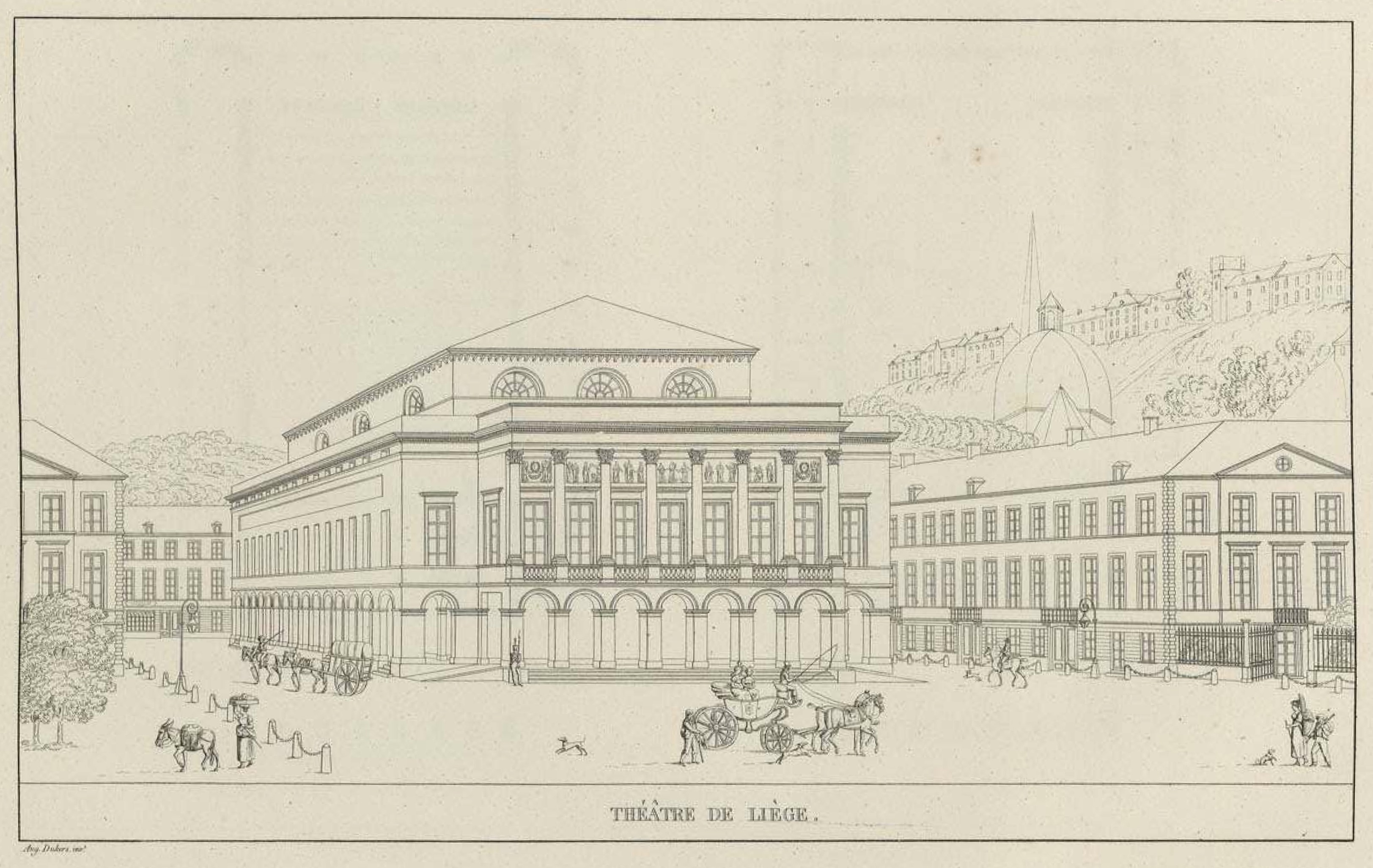
The Théâtre royal de Liège in 1827

The city became the owner in 1854. The statue in front of the building represents the Liège composer André Grétry and is the work of the sculptor Guillaume Geefs. The musician's heart was placed in the base of the statue in 1842. In 1861, the architect Julien-Étienne Rémont profoundly transformed the room and the building, which was several metres long at the back and sides. The new Second Empire style hall could then accommodate more than 1,500 spectators.

The First World War was a difficult period for the opera: in August 1914, the building was requisitioned by the German army to serve as a stable and dormitory, and it was not until October 1919 that it reopened. The Exposition internationale de Liège, in 1930, was the occasion for the definitive installation of a vast pediment with a set of allegorical figures, sculpted on the façade by Oscar Berchmans. In the same year, the city proceeded to remove the façades, which lost their white plaster. The building was spared during the Second World War.

In 1967, the troupe of the Opéra royal de Wallonie was created, on the basis of the former opera company of the Théâtre royal de Liège and that of Verviers. It is constituted as a non-profit association, initially comprising the cities of Liège and Verviers. The Ministry of National Education and French Culture of the time was financially involved shortly afterwards. During the communitarisation, the Opéra royal de Wallonie became part of the French Community of Belgium, which compensated for the impecuniosity of the city in 1990, and has since been its main source of funding. A few years later, the City, Liège Province and the Walloon Region gradually took over its financing.

The building was classified as a monument by Wallonia by decree of 18 March 1999.

=== Renovation ===
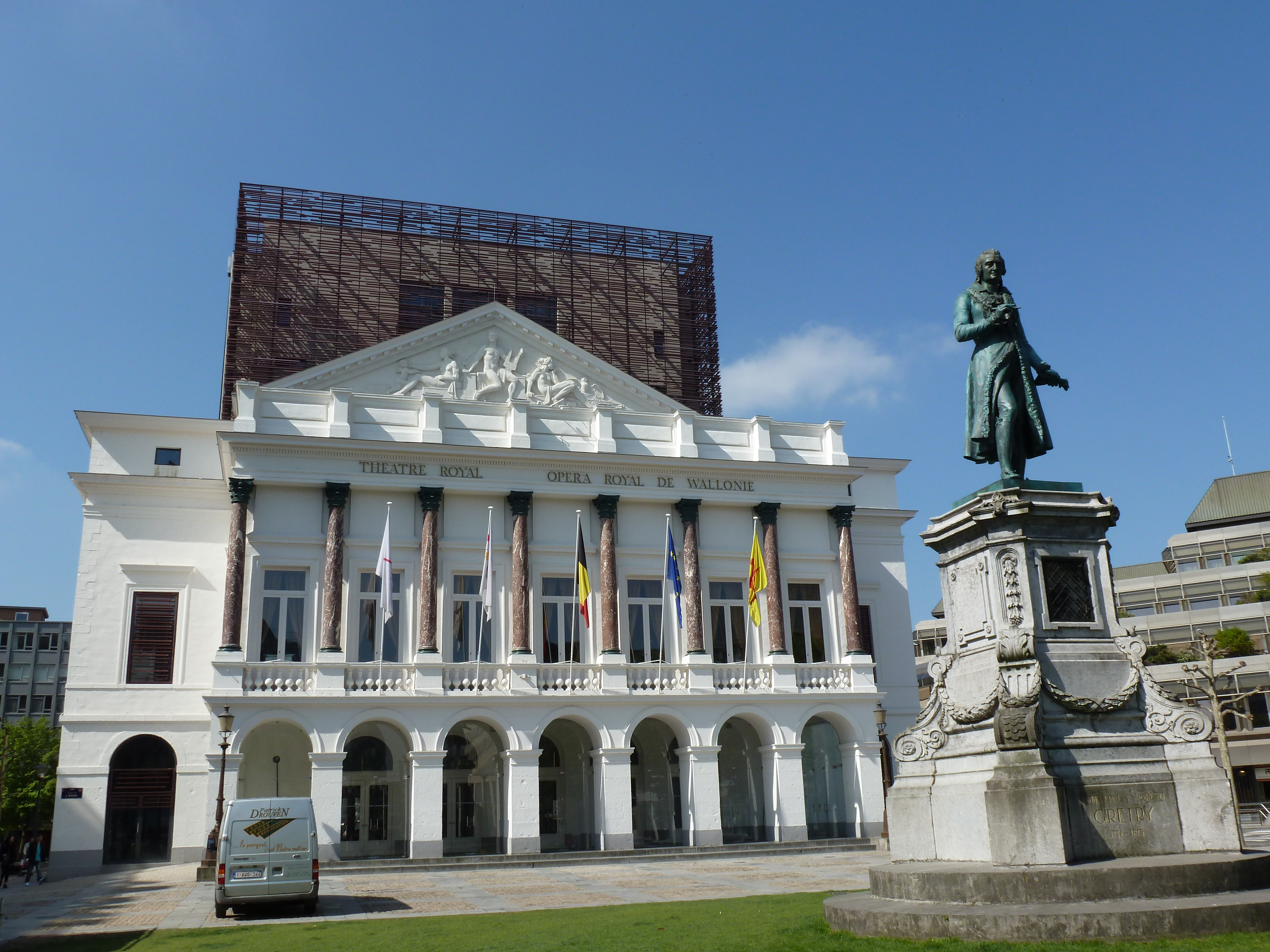
The Opéra royal de Wallonie in 2013, after renovation

The building underwent a major renovation from March 2009 to September 2012, both exterior and interior. The historic parts have been restored to their original state (large foyer, main staircase and hall). Its showroom (capacity 1,041 seats), Italian-style and its stage machinery make it one of the most modern theatres in the world. (Note: According to Stefano Mazzonis, Opera Director, the Opera has "one of the most efficient stages in the world, enough to produce the greatest shows and we must remain at this level" Cf.Joël Matriche (15 September 2012). "Un des meilleurs plateaux au monde". Le Soir (in French).)

The building was also expanded. An ultramodern structure has been installed in height in order to increase the height of the stage cage, and is equipped with a so-called multi-purpose room (Raymond Rossius Room) that can accommodate smaller shows, rehearsals or symposiums, conferences, and workshops. The renovation plans were prepared as a collaboration among three architectural firms, A2RC, Aa Architectes associés and Origin Architecture et Engineering.

From November 2009 until the end of the construction period, performances were held at the "Palais Opéra": a tent temporarily erected on the Bavarian Hospital space.

The renovated Opéra Royal de Wallonia was inaugurated on 19 September 2012, with a performance of César Franck's Stradella (1841), staged here for the first time, in a production by Jaco Van Dormael, in the presence of the Belgian heir couple, Philippe and Mathilde.

== Structure ==
=== Management ===
In 2006, the French Community's subsidy to the Opera was €12,672,000, (Note: Amount to which must be added a subsidy of €174,000, serving as repayment of the loan contracted by the institution.) of which nearly two thirds are paid in salaries, since it employs more than three hundred people. (Note: Some 210 people work at the Opera to which must be added temporary contracts, generally artists hired in connection with a particular production :"Tous les visages de l'Opéra". L'Avenir. 18 September 2012.)

The capacity of the hall is 1,044 seats.

The troupe of the Opéra royal de Wallonie has had as successive directors:

- 1967–1992: Raymond Rossius (1926–2005)
- 1992–1996: Paul Danblon (born 1931)
- 1996–2007: Jean-Louis Grinda (born 1960)
- 2007–2021: Stefano Mazzonis di Pralafera (1948–2021)

From 2007 until 2021, the Director General of the company was Stefano Mazzonis di Pralafera. He was also the artistic director. Previous music directors of the company have included Paolo Arrivabeni (2008–2017) and Speranza Scappucci (2017–2022), the first female music director and principal conductor in the history of the company. She stood down as music director at the close of the 2021–22 season. In January 2022, the company announced the appointment of Giampaolo Bisanti as its next music director, effective with the 2022–2023 season. In August 2025, the company announced the extension of Bisanti's contract as music director through June 2031.

The Opéra royal de Wallonie is a member of the Réseau européen pour la sensibilisation à l'opéra et à la danse (RESEO) and Opera Europa.

=== Orchestra and choir of the Opéra royal de Wallonie ===
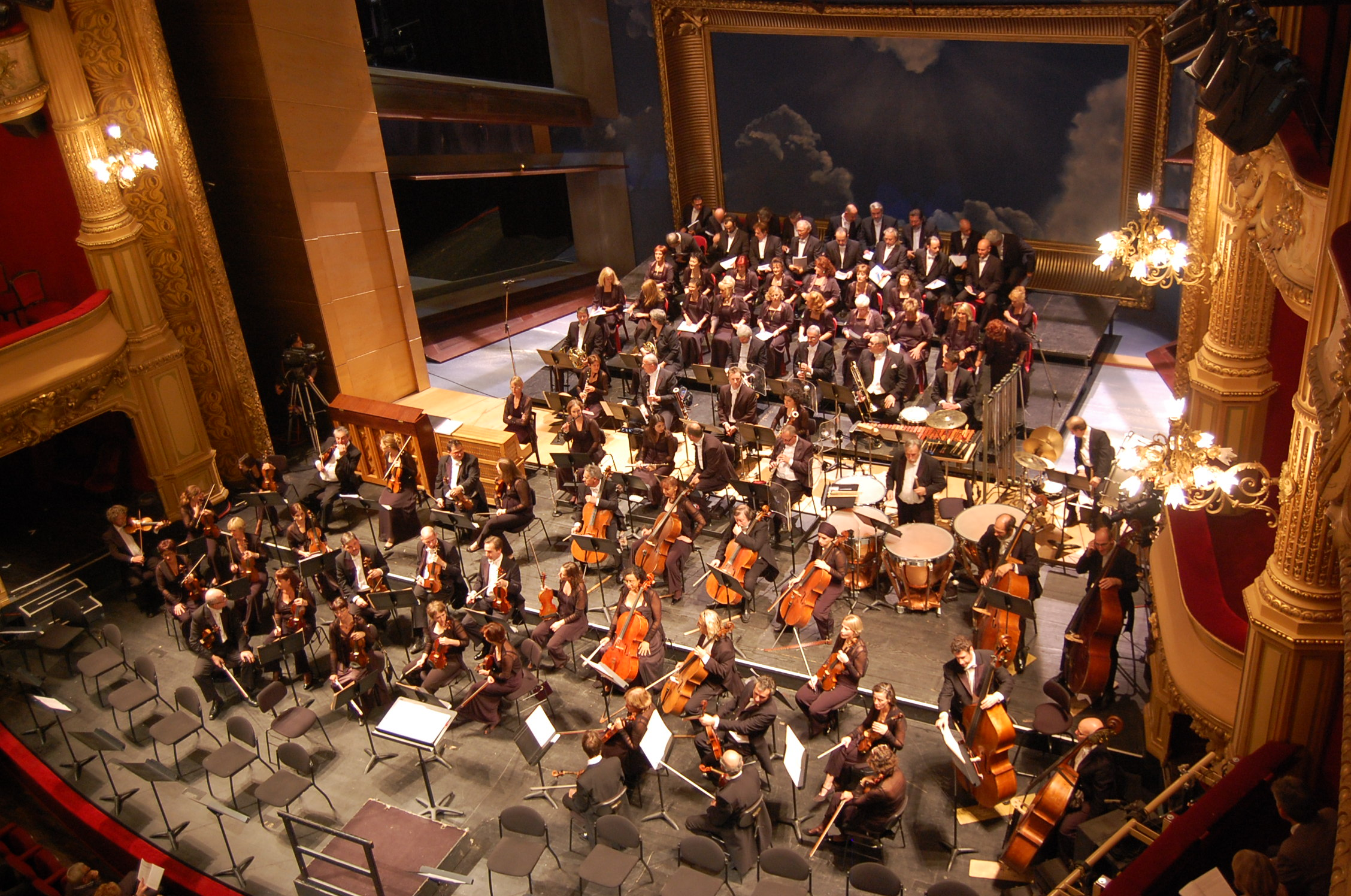
The orchestra and choir

In addition to its in-house performances, the orchestra and the choir also perform abroad, such as at the Balbeeck International Festival and the Santander Festival.

=== Ballet of the Opéra royal de Wallonie ===
Founded at the same time as the opera company, the ballet of the Opéra royal de Wallonie was created in 1967. Essentially interpreting the entertainment in the classical lyrical repertoire, the ballet is gradually moving towards greater autonomy and a neoclassical style. Drastic budgetary restrictions forced the Board of Directors to dissolve the ballet in 1997.

The ballet has had André Leclair, Gigi Caciuleanu and Jacques Dombrowski as its members. Among the danseurs étoiles, are Ambra Vallo, nowadays Principal at the Royal Ballet.

=== Workshops ===
Since its creation in 1967, one of the major strengths of the Opéra royal de Wallonie has been to operate as an independent entity. This is why, in the 1970s, the company set up its own set and costume making workshops. The buildings that house the various trades were, at that time, located in various parts of the city.

During the 1996–97 season, when the colossal sets and costumes for La traviata were created, new needs became apparent, to address the lack of space and functionality of the then-existing facilities. Thus, the Opéra royal de Wallonie decided to centralise its production departments in a single site, at Ans, in June 2002. This new architectural complex covers an area of 2,660 m^{2} (28,600 sq ft) and then groups the workshops into a single place: decoration (carpentry, ironwork, painting and accessories), costumes, (sewing, shoe, costume decoration) and make-up-wig-making

=== Studio Marcel Désiron ===
Until 2003, the orchestra rehearsed in the basement of the Royal Theatre.

In 2002, the transfer of the set design workshops to their new installations in Ans freed the buildings from the rue des Tawes in Liège. The former set assembly hall presented a new opportunity in terms of volume and asymmetry (non-parallel walls, multi-paned roof).

An acoustic study was commissioned and demonstrated the feasibility of the project. After a rehearsal of the orchestra organised to "test" the hall, the Royal Walloon Opera decided to build a 240 m^{2} (2,600 sq ft) rehearsal room, 8 m (26 ft) high. The objective was to carry out the work so that the musicians could rehearse in 2003.

Since the 2003–04 season, all orchestra rehearsals have been held in this space, which can accommodate nearly 120 musicians. If this place is primarily reserved for music, it can also be transformed into a stage production studio, if necessary.

== Anecdotes ==
- In 2013, the theatre hosted the shooting of the film A Promise by Patrice Leconte.

== Notes and references ==
=== Bibliography ===
- Dejarnac, Patrick (1995). Ballet masques. Liège: Chauveheid.
- Marchesani, Frédéric (2012). Le Théâtre de Liège. Du Théâtre royal à l'opéra royal de Wallonie. Namur: Institut du patrimoine wallon. p. 304. ISBN 978-2-87522-086-8.
- Martiny, Jules (1887). Histoire du Théâtre de Liège, depuis son origine jusqu'à nos jours. Liège: Vaillant-Carmanne.
- Vendrix, Philippe (1995). La Genèse d'un opéra. Le Théâtre de Liège en 1820. Liège: Société liégeoise de Musicologie.
