= Lucien Garban =

French composer, music arranger and editor

Lucien Garban (1877–1959) was a French composer, music arranger and editor who wrote transcriptions still performed in the modern repertoire. The Bibliothèque nationale de France lists about twenty original works by Garban and a large number of transcriptions by other composers. Many of his works were published under the pen name Roger Branga. He was a member of Société des Apaches.

Garban's transcriptions of music for piano solo or piano four hands included Maurice Ravel's string quartet, Introduction and Allegro, Rapsodie espagnole, Valses nobles et sentimentales, Ma mère l'Oye, Trio for piano, violin and cello, Kaddisch from Deux mélodies hébraïques, Le tombeau de Couperin, Berceuse sur le nom de Gabriel Fauré, and Boléro. He also transcribed a few scenes from the opera L'enfant et les sortilèges for piano or piano four hands. The four hand piano duet version of La valse frequently is performed.

Other Garban transcriptions include L'apprenti sorcier by Paul Dukas and Saint-Saëns's Le carnaval des animaux for solo piano.

Garban studied under Gabriel Fauré at the Conservatoire de Paris. He served as musical director of the publishing house Durand until 1959.

Around 1900, Garban along with Maurice Ravel and a number of young artists, poets, critics, and musicians joined together in an informal group; they came to be known as Les Apaches ("The Hooligans"), a name coined by Ricardo Viñes to represent their status as "artistic outcasts".

== Notable recordings ==
- The duo Sergio Tempo - Karin Lechner, for example, recorded his version of Ravel's Daphnis et Chloé, suite No. 2 transcribed for two pianos in 2007.
- Leon Fleisher recorded Garban's La valse piano transcription as a duet with his wife – pianist Katherine Jacobson – on the 2015 album Four Hands
