= Laurence Morton =

Laurence Hamilton Morton (October 16, 1924 – February 24, 2002) was a pianist and teacher, and chair of the Bob Jones University (Greenville, South Carolina) piano department for over 40 years. Among his former students some are notable conductors, concert pianists, composers, recording artists, deans, professors, ministers, church musicians and missionaries.

Morton remained an active performer well into his later years. Morton was known for his expertise in performing the piano music of Brazilian composer Heitor Villa-Lobos, often performing The Baby's Family. He also promoted the American publication of piano music by Polish composer, Andrzej Dutkiewicz.

While a student at the Toronto Conservatory of Music, Morton studied briefly with Alberto Guerrero, who also taught Glenn Gould. Morton taught briefly at Texas Christian University before coming to Bob Jones University where spent the rest of his life.

Morton also taught summer sessions at the Interlochen Center for the Arts.

Morton was married to Anne McKenzie, and they had a daughter, Barbara; all three became professional musicians.

A "Laurence Hamilton Morton Memorial Piano Scholarship" was established by the Greenville Music Teachers Association in his memory.

== Notable students ==
- Bradlee Hedrick, concert pianist.
- Jonathan William Moyer, organist/director of music at The Church of the Covenant, Cleveland, Ohio.
- Joy Puckett Schreier, concert pianist.
- LaShannon Hyder, concert pianist.
- Sigrid Luther – Music Teachers National Association, Board of Directors.
- Matthew Edwards, concert pianist; Director of Keyboard Studies, Missouri Western State University.
- Matthew Odell, concert pianist, faculty, The Juilliard School.

== Publications ==
- "Villa-Lobos: Brazilian Pioneer," Clavier 16, January 1977
