= Malcolm Troup =

Canadian pianist (1930–2021)

Malcolm Troup (22 February 1930 – 8 December 2021) was a Canadian classical pianist, musicologist, academic administrator and teacher, who spent much of his career in London.

== Early life and education ==
Troup was born on 22 February 1930 in Toronto to Wendela (née Seymour Conway), a musician, and William Troup, a stockbroker who had farmed cattle in Scotland. He received his earliest piano lessons from his mother. He studied with Alberto Guerrero and Norman Wilks at the Toronto Conservatory; Glenn Gould was a fellow pupil and the two became friends. Troup moved to Europe, studying first with Sidney Harrison at the Guildhall School of Music in London (1950–52) and then with Walter Gieseking in Saarbrücken (1954–56), receiving financial support from the Imperial Order Daughters of the Empire.

He gained a DPhil from the University of York in 1968, with a thesis entitled "Messiaen and the Modern Mind"; his supervisor was the composer and musicologist, Wilfrid Mellers.

== Career as a pianist ==
Troup first appeared with the CBC Toronto Orchestra, playing the Piano Concerto in D minor by Anton Rubinstein, at the age of 17. In 1953, he appeared at the Royal Festival Hall in London, and later accompanied Margaret Rutherford on a tour of Scandinavia. In 1956 he made an extensive tour of Canada, and during the late 1950s and 1960s he often toured in Canada, South America and Europe, including many concerts in Eastern Europe and the Soviet Union.

Despite the demands of his academic career (see below), he did not give up performing and touring, and continued to expand his repertoire into his seventies. He toured Australia in 1988. After his retirement from academia in 1993, he continued to give concerts, including a recital for the 50th anniversary of Martinů's death in 2009. His best-known recording is of Messiaen's Vingt Regards sur l'enfant-Jésus (1986).

== Academic career and societies ==
Troup served as music director of the Guildhall School of Music and Drama in London (1970–75). In 1975, he co-founded the music department at London's City University, where he remained until his retirement in 1993. He was elevated to a chair in 1981. At City, he started courses in electronic music and audio engineering, founded a pioneering lectureship in Jewish music, and gave honorary doctorates to the popular musicians David Bowie and Peter Gabriel. Troup was an early influence on the New Complexity composer Chris Dench. As a musicologist, Troup studied Liszt, Debussy and Messiaen.

In 1993, Troup co-founded the Beethoven Piano Society of Europe with Carola Grindea, and served as its chair (1993–2014). He also held positions in other British and European music societies, including master of the Worshipful Company of Musicians (1999–2000), chair of the Ernest Bloch Society, and vice-president of the European Piano Teachers' Association and editor of its journal.

== Awards and honours ==
He was awarded the Harriet Cohen Commonwealth Medal (1955) and the Liszt Medal of the American Liszt Society (1998). He received an honorary professorship at the University of Chile (1967) and an honorary LL.D. degree from Memorial University (1985).

== Personal life ==
In 1962, Troup married Carmen Lamarca Subercasaux (died 2011), from Chile, in Rome, and they settled in the London suburb of Islington. They had one daughter.

He served as a governor (1979–2010) and vice president (from 2010) of The Music Therapy Charity. In his final months he lived in Newbury, Berkshire, where he participated in a video illustrating the use of music therapy, in which he is shown responding to his own recording of Messiaen's Vingt Regards sur l'Enfant-Jésus.

Troup died on 8 December 2021, in Reading, Berkshire, at the age of 91.
