= Ricardo Araújo =

Ricardo Araújo may refer to:

- Ricardo Araujo (musician) (born 1978), Colombian musician
- Ricardo Araújo (footballer, born 1998), Portuguese footballer who plays as a defender
- Ricardo Araujo (politician) (born 1977), Mayor of Guimarães
