= William Aide =

Canadian pianist (born 1938)

William Aide CM
- Born: March 27, 1938 (age 88); Timmins, Ontario, Canada
- Occupation: Pianist
- Notable work: He has played with conductors Sir Andrew Davis, Arthur Fiedler and Walter Susskind.

William John Aide CM (born 27 March 1938) is a Canadian pianist. He is a pupil of Alberto Guerrero. He has played with conductors Sir Andrew Davis, Arthur Fiedler and Walter Susskind. He has accompanied Lois Marshall. Glenn Gould called him one of "the most inventive and imaginative pianistic talents of our time."

== Books ==
- Starting from Porcupine (1996) (autobiography)
- Sea Voyage with Pigs (2002) (poetry)
- Letters to a Musical Friend (2007) (poetry)
