= List of compositions by Glenn Gould =

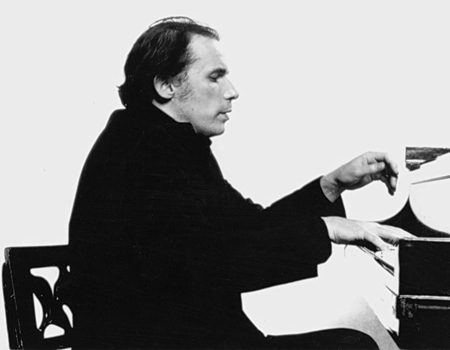
Glenn Gould

This is a chronological list of compositions by Glenn Gould.

== Completed original works ==
- A Merry Thought, for piano (1941; earliest surviving work)
- Our Gifts, for voice & piano (1943)
- Rondo in D major, piano (1948)
- Suite for Twelfth Night, for piano (1949; MS lost):

1. Nocturne
2. Whimsical Nonsense
3. Elizabethan Gaiety
4. Regal Atmosphere

- Sonata for Piano (1948–50)
- 5 Short Piano Pieces (c. 1949–50)
- Sonata for Bassoon and Piano (1950)
- Prelude, Cantilena and Gigue, for clarinet & bassoon (1951)
- 2 Piano Pieces (1951)
- Three Fugues on One Subject, No. 2 (1952)
- String Quartet in F minor, Op. 1 (1953–55)
- So You Want to Write a Fugue?, for 4 solo voices & piano or string quartet (1957–58)
- Lieberson Madrigal, for 4 solo voices (1964)
- From Chilkoot's Icy Glacier, for 4 solo voices (1967)

== Unfinished, lost, and projected works ==
- Variations in G minor, piano (1949)
- 2 Pieces for organ (1950)
- String Trio (1950)
- [The Metamorphosis], opera based on the short story by Franz Kafka (c. 1956)
- Sonata for Clarinet and Piano (late 1950s)
- The Farmer and the Farmer's Wife, madrigal, based on poem from the novel Sarah Binks by Paul Heibert
- [Portrait of John Donne], song cycle for mezzo-soprano and piano, based on John Donne's Holy Sonnets (1959–64)
- A Letter from Stalingrad, concert aria (early 1960s)
- Dr. Strauss Writes an Opera, opera based on the life of Richard Strauss (early to mid-1960s)
- Sonata in E-flat major, for wind ensemble and strings (c. 1964)

== Arrangements and cadenzas ==
- Beethoven, Piano Concerto No. 1, cadenzas to first and third movements (1954–56)
- Handel, Prelude from Harpsichord Suite No. 1, arrangement of (1972)
- Wagner, three transcriptions for piano (1972–73):
  1. Siegfried Idyll
  2. Prelude to Act I of Die Meistersinger von Nürnberg
  3. Dawn and Siegfried's Rhine Journey from Götterdämmerung
- Ravel, La valse, arrangement of the composer's piano transcription (1975)
- Strauss, Oboe Concerto, arrangement for oboe and piano (1982)

== Recordings ==
- String Quartet in F minor, Op. 1. The Symphonia Quartet (Kurt Loebel & Elmer Setzer - violins; Tom Brennand - viola; Thomas Liberti - cello). Columbia Records ML 5578 (1960) / Sony 88697147582 (2007).
- Lieberson Madrigal; String Quartet in F minor, Op. 1; Two Pieces for Piano; Sonata for Bassoon and Piano; Piano Sonata (unfinished); "So You Want to Write a Fugue?". Claron McFadden - soprano; Marie-Thérèse Keller - mezzo-soprano; Jean-Paul Fouchécourt - tenor; Harry van der Kamp - bass; Bruno Monsaingeon & Gilles Apap - violins; Gérard Caussé - viola; Alain Meunier - cello; Catherine Marchese - bassoon; Emile Naoumoff - piano; Nicolas Rivenq - conductor. Sony SK 47 184 (1992).
- Suite for Twelfth Night. Performed by the composer with his own spoken introduction. Private recording (February 1949).

== Sources ==
- Bazzana, Kevin. 2005. Wondrous Strange: The Life And Art Of Glenn Gould, pp. 50, 135–142, 275–284. Oxford University Press, ISBN 9780195182460.
- Bazzana, Kevin; Payzant, Geoffrey; Beckwith, John. "Glenn Gould - The Canadian Encyclopedia". The Historica Foundation. Archived from the original on 11 July 2017.
- National Library of Canada (1992). Descriptive catalogue of the Glenn Gould papers (2 vols.). ISBN 0-660-57327-X.
