= Ricardo Araujo (musician) =

Colombian musician (born 1978)

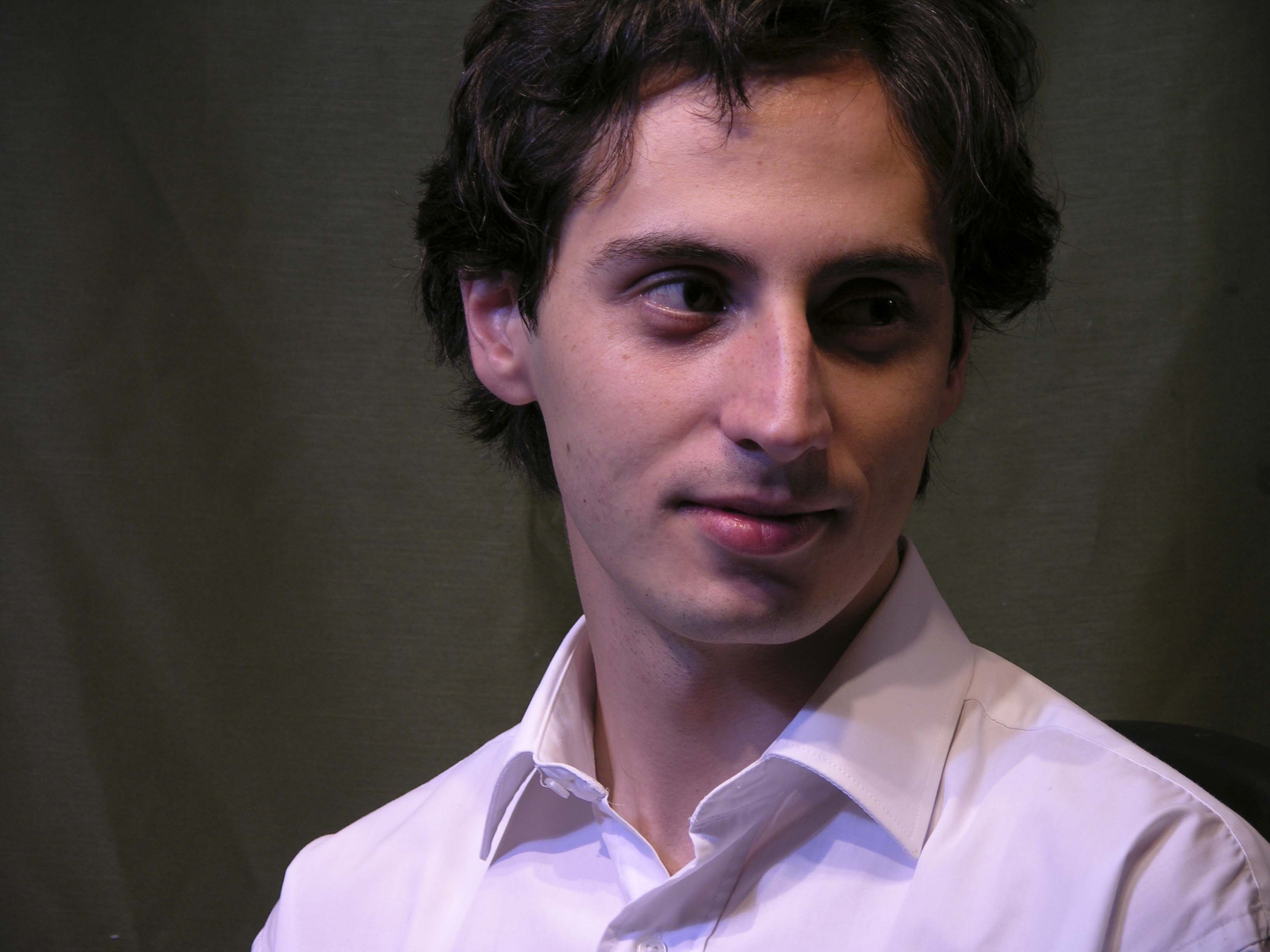
- Born: July 20, 1978 (age 48)
- Occupations: Pianist, composer, conductor

Ricardo Araujo (born July 20, 1978) is a Colombian pianist, composer and conductor. Araujo was born in 1978 in Bogotá, Colombia.

== Early life ==
Araujo evolved in the abstract universe of painting and music. He began his musical studies in 1989 with pianist Lile Tiempo and in 1990, as Marie-Louise Toupouzien's student. Araujo was awarded by the Belgium Superior Jury. At age 12, he gave his first piano recital in Brussels, playing compositions from Bach and Mozart. Seven months later, he made his debut with Brussels' Royal Conservatoire chamber orchestra when Martha Argerich noticed him.

In 1991, back in Colombia, he simultaneously went on with his pianist, music director and composer training. He quickly became Dimitr Manolov's assistant, then second music director of the Colombia Symphony Orchestra. Before leaving Colombia in February 1998 to settle in Paris, Araujo chose to dedicate himself exclusively to music writing and orchestras' direction.

== Career ==
Since 1993, Araujo has given many concerts in Latin America as well as in Europe.

=== Conductor ===
As a conductor, he was in charge of creating several works during the 1997 Bogotá Contemporary Music Festival. He then has directed Mozart concertos from his piano with Rome's Santa Cecilia Orchestra.

Araujo has worked with keys figures such as Michel Merlet, Vladimir Ashkenazy, Marek Janowski, Henri Dutilleux and Mstislav Rostropovitch. He has performed in Royal Conservatory of Brussels, Caracas Teatro Teresa Carreno, Konzerthaus, Vienna, among others. He has directed Colombia Symphony Orchestra since 1996, and since 1998, Paris Opera Orchestra, Stuttgart Radio-Sinfonieorchester, Bayerische Staatsphilarmonie and many more. In 2003, he became William Christie's assistant during the Paris National Opera creation of J.P. Rameau's Boréades and then, Armin Jordan's with a new interpretation of Mozart Così fan tutte. The very same year, he has been invited to play two recitals in Colombia. Both have been unanimously greeted by the national press. Since February 2004, he has been a regular guest at Paris Cercle de l'Union Interallié.

In March 2005, he was named as musical director of Cartagena de Indias New Opera and Festival, and has been in charge of musical programming.

=== Composer ===
As a composer, some of his works came into being during events such as Colombia Contemporary music festival in Bogota, or Gerberoy festival in France. Some of the interpreters were Eduardo Herrera, Oscar Hernandez, Dimitr Manolov, and Anne-Julie Kerkhello.

In 2001, he worked for the IRCAM, when he composed two works of electronic music which would be rearranged for orchestra symphonies.

In 2007, willing to gather Latin American young talents, he founded, with the help of Latin American diplomatic missions, the New Latin American Philharmonic Orchestra and became its musical director. Under his influence, the Orchestra aims to promote his continent symphonic repertoire.
