= Statue of Glenn Gould =

Sculpture in Toronto, Ontario, Canada

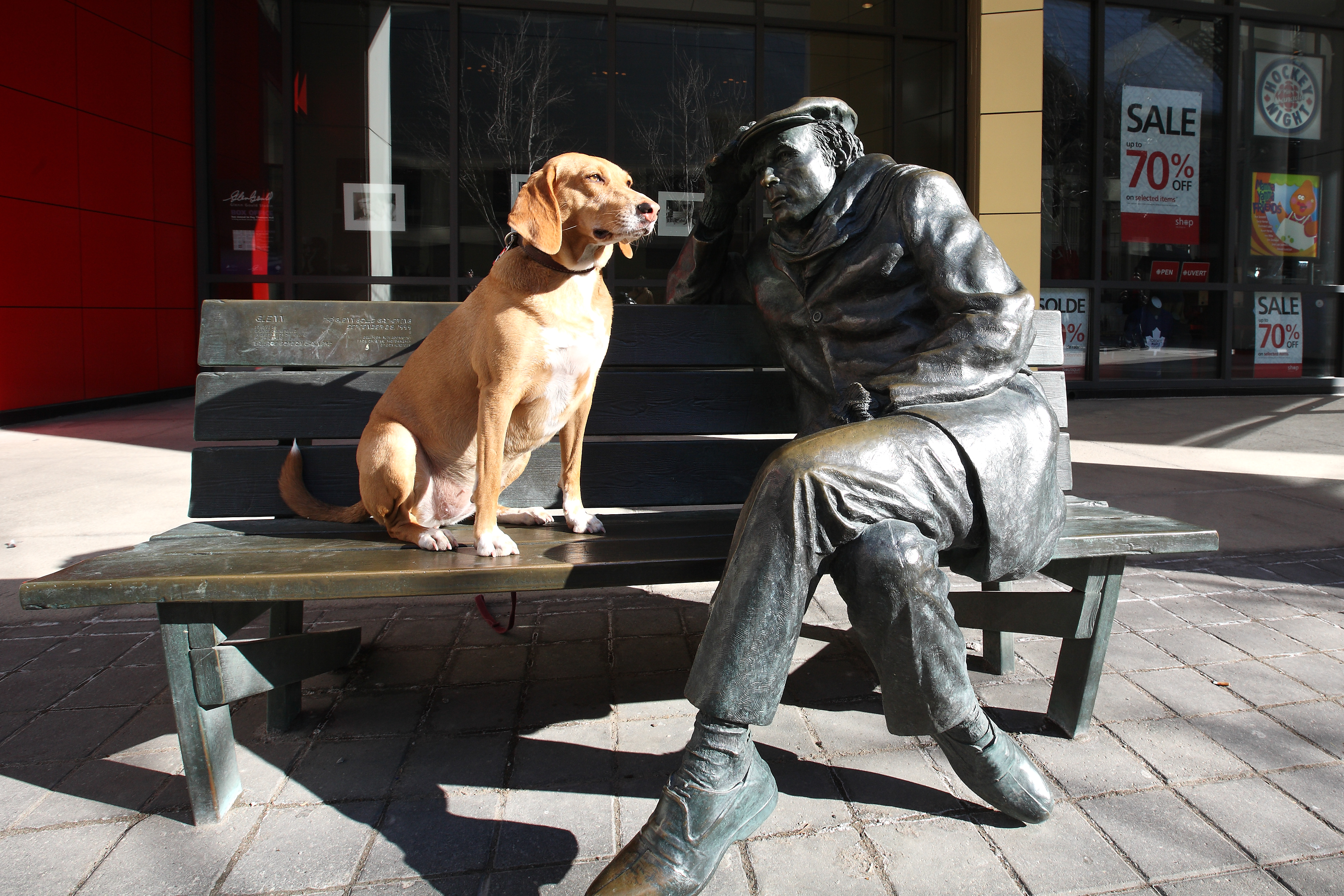
- The statue in 2009
- Subject: Glenn Gould
- Location: Toronto, Ontario, Canada; 43°38′39.6″N 79°23′16″W

A statue of Canadian classical pianist Glenn Gould by Ruth Abernethy is installed outside CBC's offices in downtown Toronto, in Ontario, Canada. The bronze sculpture was unveiled in 1999.
