= Matthew Odell =

American pianist

- Born: New Hampshire United States
- Genres: Contemporary, Classical
- Occupation: Pianist
- Instrument: Piano
- Years active: 1989 - present

Matthew Odell is an American pianist. He has performed as both a solo and collaborative pianist, performing at a variety of locations throughout the United States including New York's Carnegie Hall and the Kennedy Center in Washington, DC, Paris, Nice, Moscow, St. Petersburg, Helsinki, Taipei, and Kyoto.

== Background ==
The New Hampshire-born pianist Matthew Odell began his studies at the age of 10 and has since won acclaim for performances of a wide range of repertoire as a solo recitalist, soloist with orchestra, and chamber musician. Recent concerts have including such diverse projects as Messiaen’s Des canyons aux étoiles. . . with Maestro David Robertson and the Juilliard Orchestra for the reopening of Alice Tully Hall, a performance in the New York Philharmonic’s Stravinsky Festival, and solo recitals of Messiaen’s Vingt Regards sur l’Enfant-Jésus. He also performed contemporary works for piano and orchestra with the AXIOM Ensemble and completed a six-concert tour of Taiwan with the Hampton Trio.

In addition to performances in Weill Recital Hall and Zankel Hall at Carnegie Hall, Alice Tully Hall at the Lincoln Center, and the 92nd Street Y, all in New York, Odell has appeared at the Kennedy Center in Washington, D.C., in Boston, Chicago, Paris, Moscow, St. Petersburg, Taipei, Taiwan, and Helsinki, Finland. He has also performed at the Aspen Music Festival in Aspen, Colorado, the European American Musical Alliance in Paris, New York’s Focus! Festival, the La Gesse Festival in Toulouse, France, Nuits musicales and Concerts du cloître in Nice, France, and the Rohm International Music Festival in Kyoto, Japan.

An advocate of modern music, Odell has premièred works written for him. He has performed contemporary repertoire with the New Juilliard Ensemble, the AXIOM Ensemble, and the American Art Song Festival, a group he founded in 2004. In addition, he has also worked with composers, including Pierre Boulez, John Corigliano, Mark Adamo, Michel Merlet, and Robert Aldridge. Odell's work with the music of Olivier Messiaen has been seen in performances of his Couleurs de la cité céleste with the Peabody Camerata, Des canyons aux étoiles and Sept Haïkaï with the AXIOM ensemble. He has also performed the Quartet for the End of Time in Alice Tully Hall, songs and other chamber works, and an ongoing project of Messiaen’s complete works for solo piano. Recitals include a program of the music of Messiaen and his students and a tribute to Messiaen’s wife, Yvonne Loriod.

Odell is a founding member of the Hampton Trio, a group which presents outstanding pieces from the established repertoire alongside new works written for them. Odell's special love of the art song repertoire has led to countless recitals with singers from around the world. He currently serves on the coaching faculty of the Académie internationale d’été de Nice in France and has appeared at Carnegie Hall in the Marilyn Horne Foundations’s festival The Song Continues.

Odell currently teaches at The Juilliard School in New York and often gives master classes, lectures, and workshops at universities and professional conferences throughout the U.S and Europe. In 2010 he graduated with a doctoral degree from The Juilliard School, studying with Margo Garrett, Jonathan Feldman, and Brian Zeger. Additionally, he studied with Marian Hahn at the Peabody Conservatory of Music, graduating Pi Kappa Lambda with both a master of music degree and a graduate performance diploma in piano performance. He also worked with Karl-Heinz Kämmerling at the Mozarteum in Salzburg, Austria, with Ann Schein at the Aspen Music School, with Laurence Morton at Bob Jones University, and in master classes with Leon Fleisher, Ian Hobson, Richard Goode, Peter Hill, Martin Isepp, and the Tokyo String Quartet.

== Current work ==
Matthew Odell teaches at The Juilliard School and the Académie internationale d’été in Nice, France. In addition, he gives masterclasses and lectures at colleges, schools, and professional conferences in the United States and Europe. He is involved in a long-term project to perform the complete piano music of Olivier Messiaen, including specific recitals of the music of Messiaen and his students and a recital of music premièred and championed by Messiaen's wife, Yvonne Loriod. In celebration of the 150th anniversary of the birth of Claude Debussy in 2012, Odell performed several programs of his songs in a series at the Lincoln Center in New York entitled Forgotten Melodies: The Songs of Claude Debussy. He is commissioning several composers to write new pieces for him.

== Awards ==
Odell has been awarded the following:

- Presser Award
- Sarah Stuhlman Zierler Award
- Two Peabody Career Development Grants
- Lucrezia Bori Grant,
- Virginia Allison Accompanying Award
- Fellowships and grants from the New Hampshire State Council on the Arts

== Recordings ==
- Connections: The Music of Olivier Messiaen and his Students (Albany, 2019)
- Sonatas for Flute and Piano by Gary Schocker with flutist Leslie Neighbor Stroud (Centaur, 2019)

== Sound Clips ==
- Elliott Carter "Caténaires"
- Toru Taketmitsu "Rain Tree Sketch II-In Memoriam Olivier Messiaen"
- Olivier Messiaen "Regard de l'Esprit de joie"
