= La valse =

Orchestral composition by Maurice Ravel

- Waltz by Maurice Ravel
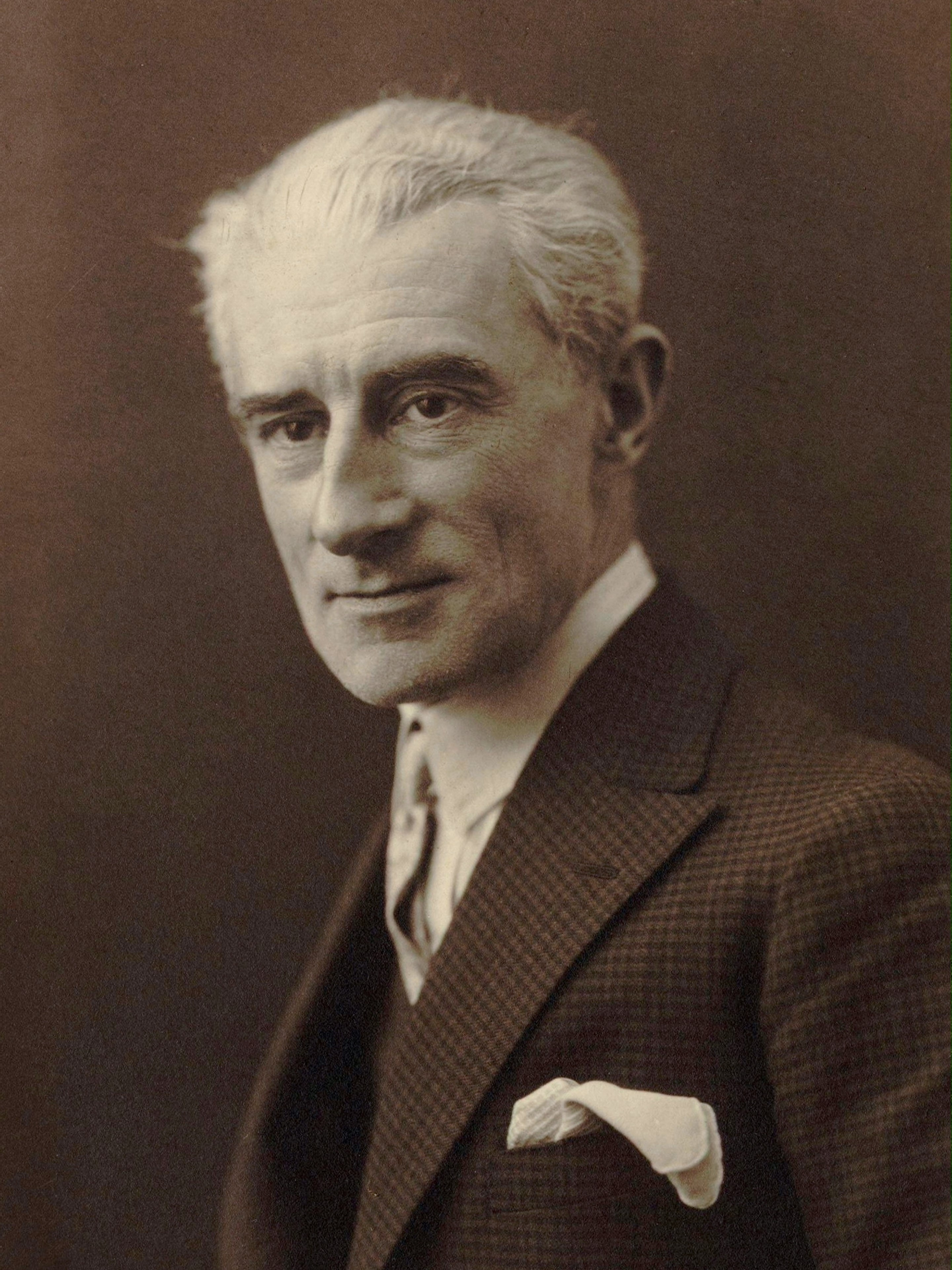
- Maurice Ravel
- Composed: 1919-1920
- Performed: 12 December 1920
- Duration: 12 minutes

La valse (The Waltz), poème chorégraphique pour orchestre (a choreographic poem for orchestra), is a work written by Maurice Ravel between February 1919 and 1920; it was first performed on 12 December 1920 in Paris. It was conceived as a ballet but is now more often heard as a concert work.

The work has been described as a tribute to the waltz; the composer George Benjamin, in his analysis of La valse, summarized the ethos of the work: "Whether or not it was intended as a metaphor for the predicament of European civilization in the aftermath of the Great War, its one-movement design plots the birth, decay and destruction of a musical genre: the waltz." But Ravel denied that La valse is a reflection of post-World War I Europe, saying, "While some discover an attempt at parody, indeed caricature, others categorically see a tragic allusion in it—the end of the Second Empire, the situation in Vienna after the war, etc... This dance may seem tragic, like any other emotion... pushed to the extreme. But one should only see in it what the music expresses: an ascending progression of sonority, to which the stage comes along to add light and movement." Ravel also said in 1922, "It doesn't have anything to do with the present situation in Vienna, and it also doesn't have any symbolic meaning in that regard. In the course of La Valse, I did not envisage a dance of death or a struggle between life and death. (The year of the choreographic setting, 1855, repudiates such an assumption.)"

In his tribute to Ravel after his death in 1937, Paul Landormy called La valse "the most unexpected of the compositions of Ravel, revealing to us heretofore unexpected depths of Romanticism, power, vigor, and rapture in this musician whose expression is usually limited to the manifestations of an essentially classical genius."

== Creation and meaning ==
The idea of La valse began first with the title "Vienne", then Wien (French and German for "Vienna", respectively) as early as 1906, when Ravel intended to orchestrate a piece in tribute to the waltz form and to Johann Strauss II. An earlier influence was the waltz (Fête polonaise) from Emmanuel Chabrier's opera Le roi malgré lui. In Ravel's output, a precursor to La valse is his 1911 Valses nobles et sentimentales, which contains a motif that Ravel reused in the later work. After his service in the French Army, Ravel returned to his original idea of the symphonic poem Wien. He described his attraction to waltz rhythm as follows, to Jean Marnold, while writing La valse:

You know my intense attraction to these wonderful rhythms and that I value the joie de vivre expressed in the dance much more deeply than Franckist puritanism.

Ravel completely reworked his idea of Wien into what became La valse, which was to have been written under commission from Serge Diaghilev as a ballet, but he never produced the ballet. After hearing a two-piano reduction performed by Ravel and Marcelle Meyer, Diaghilev called it a "masterpiece" but "not a ballet. It's a portrait of ballet". Hurt by the comment, Ravel ended the relationship. La valse became a popular concert work and when the two men met again in 1925, Ravel refused to shake Diaghilev's hand. Diaghilev challenged Ravel to a duel, but friends persuaded him to recant. They never met again. The ballet was premiered in Antwerp in 1926 by the Royal Flemish Opera Ballet and was produced by the Ballets Ida Rubinstein in 1928 and 1931, with choreography by Bronislava Nijinska. The music was also used for ballets of the same title, one in 1951 by George Balanchine, who had made dances for Diaghilev, and one by Frederick Ashton in 1958, at the premiere of which Francis Poulenc complimented Ashton on what he considered the first successful interpretation of Ravel's intentions for the music.

Ravel described La valse with the following preface to the score:

Through whirling clouds, waltzing couples may be faintly distinguished. The clouds gradually scatter: one sees at letter A an immense hall peopled with a whirling crowd. The scene is gradually illuminated. The light of the chandeliers bursts forth at the fortissimo letter B. Set in an imperial court, about 1855.

== Description ==
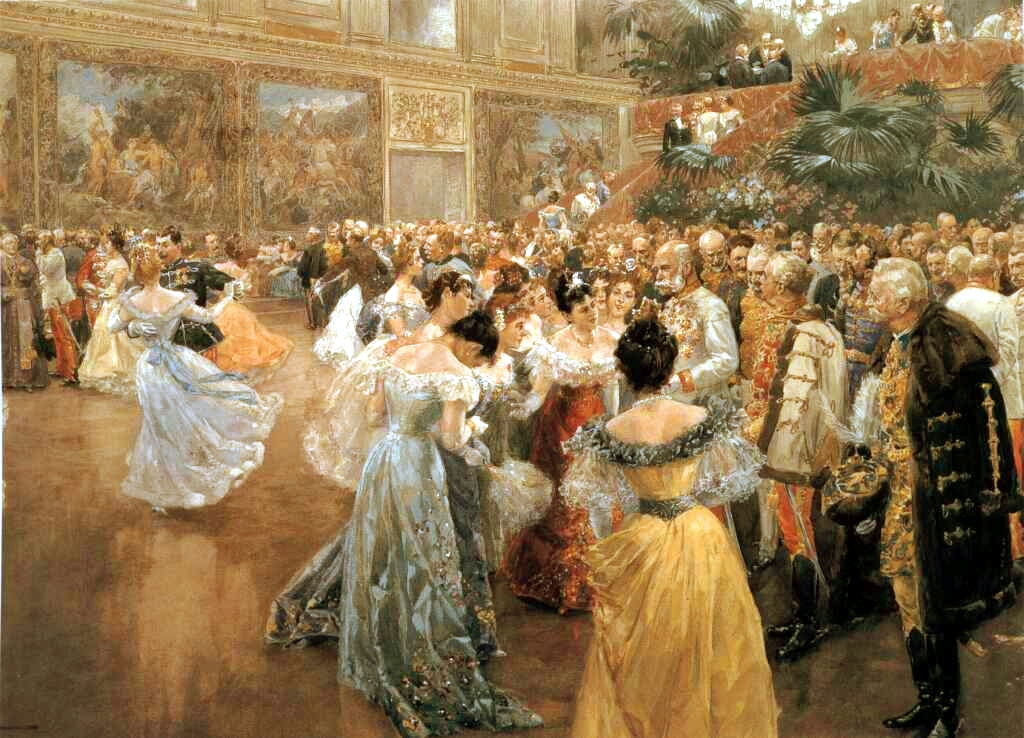
"Court ball in Vienna" by Wilhelm Gause (1900)

The beginning starts quietly (the mist), with the rumbling of the double basses with the celli and harps subsequently joining. Silently and gradually, instruments play fragmented melodies, gradually building into a subdued tune on bassoons and violas. Eventually, the harps signal the beginning culmination of instruments into the graceful melody. Led by the violins, the orchestra erupts into the work's principal waltz theme.

A series of waltzes follows, each with its own character, alternating loud and soft sequences:

- The variations by oboe, violins and flutes, mild, slightly timid but nevertheless sweet and elegant.
- The eruption of the heavy brass and timpani begins the next ebullient and pompous melody. The tune is sung by the violins as cymbals crash and the brass blare unashamedly.
- Afterwards, the violins lead a tender tune, accompanied by luxuriant humming in the cellos and clarinets. It disappears and once again returns to the sweet variations and extravagant brass.
- Enter a rather restless episode with dramatic violins, accompanied with precocious (yet seemingly wayward) woodwinds. Castanets and pizzicato add to the character of a rather erratic piece. It ends meekly and clumsily in the bassoons.
- The piece relapses into previous melodies, before a poignant and sweet tune begins in the violins. Glissando is a characteristic feature. The gentle violins are accompanied by ornate, chromatic swayings in the cellos and glissando in the harps. The tune is once again repeated by the woodwinds. As it ends, it begins to unleash some kind of climax, when it is suddenly cut off by a sweet flute.
- The flute plays a rather playful, repetitious melody, accompanied by the glockenspiel and triangle. In between, the violins seem to yearn, whilst the harps play and (bizarrely) the horns trill. Once more, as it nears its conclusion, it tries to build up into a climax, but descends once more into the 'mist' of the beginning.

So begins the piece's second half. Every melody from the first section is re-introduced, although differently, in the second section. Ravel has altered each waltz theme piece with unexpected modulations and instrumentation (for example, where flutes would normally play, they are replaced by trumpets).

Once more, Ravel breaks the momentum. A macabre sequence begins, gradually building into a disconcerting repetition. The orchestra reaches a danse macabre coda, and the work ends with an emphatic figure in duple subdivision that is a distinct departure from the waltz rhythm.

The work is scored for 3 flutes (3rd doubling piccolo), 3 oboes (3rd doubling English horn), 2 clarinets in A, bass clarinet in A, 2 bassoons, contrabassoon, 4 horns in F, 3 trumpets in C, 3 trombones, tuba, timpani, bass drum, snare drum, cymbals, triangle, tambourine, tam-tam, crotales, glockenspiel, castanets, 2 harps and strings.

== Transcriptions ==
Ravel himself gave two transcriptions for piano. One is for two pianos, which was first publicly performed by Ravel and Alfredo Casella. The other is a solo piano version. It is infrequently performed due to its difficulty.

Lucien Garban produced a transcription for piano four hands in 1920. He had transcribed Ravel's Le tombeau de Couperin in 1919 in similar fashion. Glenn Gould, who rarely played Ravel's music, made his own arrangement of it in 1975. In 2008 Andrey Kasparov produced a treatment of La valse for piano four hands with Ravel's original scoring more effectively distributed between the performers. Sean Chen recorded his own arrangement on the Steinway & Sons label in 2014.

In 2005, Don Patterson transcribed La valse for symphonic wind ensemble for the United States Marine Band. The arrangement is recorded on the album Symphonic Dances, conducted by Michael J. Colburn.

In 2020, in honor of the 100th anniversary of La valse's première, Belgian composer Tim Mulleman transcribed it for string nonet (4 vn, 2 va, 2 vc, 1 cb) for Philippe Graffin and Friends. A filmed performance was made possible by Lars Konings.

The Linos Piano Trio included a transcription of La valse for piano trio on its 2021 album Stolen Music.

In 2025, to commemorate the 150th anniversary of Ravel's birth, flutist and composer Nikka Gershman premiered her transcription of La valse, heard on flute for the first time, at Lincoln Center's Paul Hall.

== Bibliography ==
- Orenstein, Arbie; Ravel: Man and Musician (New York: Columbia University Press, 1968)
- Mawer, Deborah: "The Ballets of Maurice Ravel: Creation and Interpretation" (Aldershot: Ashgate, 2006)
