= Finger tapping (piano) =

Pianistic technique

Finger tapping is a piano technique developed by Alberto Guerrero for his pupil Glenn Gould. According to Guerrero, the idea for the technique came from a circus show with an extremely flexible young boy.

== Technique ==
Finger-tapping consists of placing one hand with the finger pads on the keyboard, with the PIP joint as the highest point, and then using the other hand to tap on the DIP joint or the fingertips, then releasing the fingers, allowing them to return quickly to the surface.

The technique is intended to make the hand learn how to minimize the effort on keys, allowing for faster play.
