= Valses nobles et sentimentales (Ravel) =

Waltz suite by Maurice Ravel

- Waltzes by Maurice Ravel
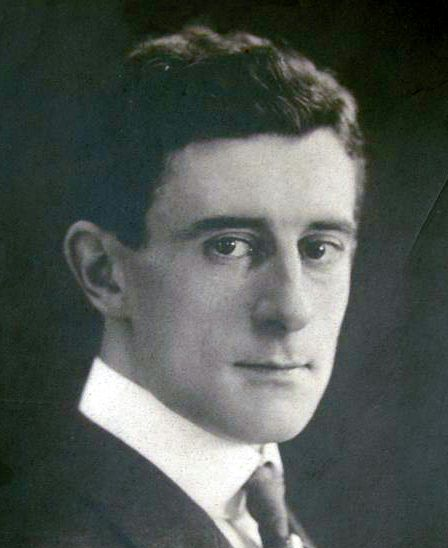
- Ravel in 1913
- Published: 1911
- Movements: eight
- Scoring: piano (also: orchestra)

The Valses nobles et sentimentales ("Noble and Sentimental Waltzes") are a suite of waltzes composed by Maurice Ravel. Its title was chosen in homage to Franz Schubert, who had released two collections of waltzes in 1823 titled Valses nobles and Valses sentimentales. The original piano version was published in 1911; an orchestration by the composer was published the following year.

The set is epigraphed by a quotation from Ravel's friend, the Symbolist poet Henri de Régnier: "…le plaisir délicieux et toujours nouveau d'une occupation inutile" ('the delicious and forever-new pleasure of a useless occupation'), derived from his 1904 book Les recontres de Monsieur de Bréot.

The suite contains an eclectic blend of Impressionist and Modernist music, which is especially evident in the orchestrated version.

== Composition and background ==
Ravel was intrigued by the waltz genre. By 1906, he had started composing what later would become La valse, in which he tried to epitomise all the genre encompassed. In 1911, prior to the 1920 publication of La valse, he published the piano version of his suite of eight Valses nobles et sentimentales. The work was premièred on 9 May 1911 by its dedicatee Louis Aubert at a recital of new works whose composers were not identified. This recital was sponsored by the Société musicale indépendante, to promote the works of more adventurous composers, without "burdening" critics with the attached labels of authorship. The idea was proposed by composer Charles Koechlin. This was in theory supposed to encourage the critics to evaluate what they actually heard rather than simply judging the piece by the name of the composer. The collection of pieces was not well received. When the votes were tallied, the nominated composers included Erik Satie, Charles Koechlin, Vincent d'Indy and even Zoltán Kodály, but "a minute majority," Ravel recalled, "ascribed the paternity of the Valses to me." The rest of the concert included works by Antoine Mariotte, Léo Sachs, Désiré-Émile Inghelbrecht, Henri Büsser, Édouard Mignan, Hector Fraggi, Lucien Wurmser and François Couperin.

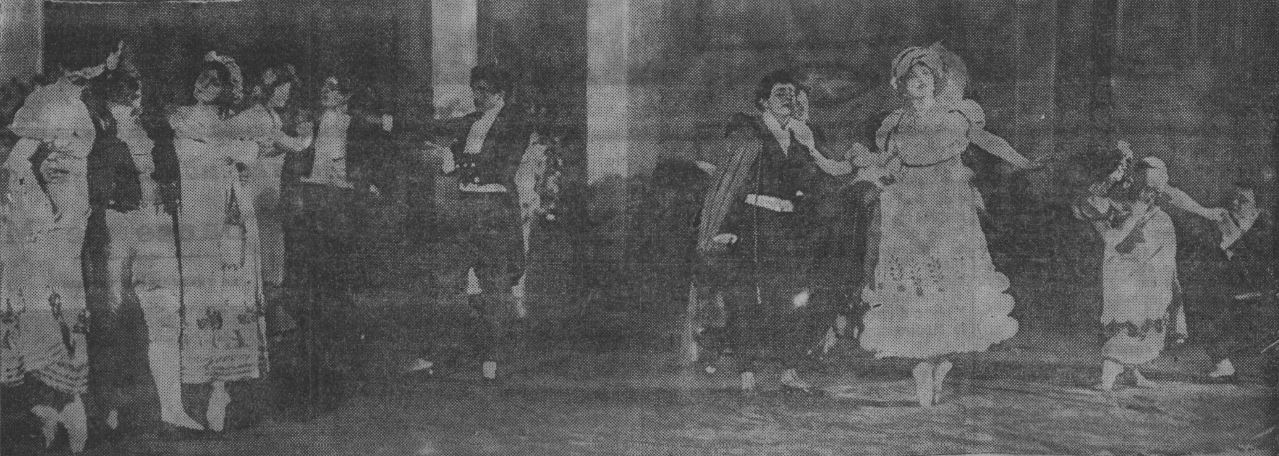
Trouhanowa and Bekefi in Adélaïde, 1912

The following year an orchestration of the Valses was published. This work indicated that the composer wanted to create a 'clearer' orchestral sound than had been the case for the preceding Ma mère l'Oye.

The British premiere was on 25 September 1913 at the Promenade Concerts, under the baton of Henry Wood.

The orchestrated ballet version of the Valses nobles et sentimentales was named Adélaïde, ou le langage des fleurs (Adelaide: or, The Language of Flowers). There is a striking resemblance between this story and the plot of Giuseppe Verdi's La traviata based on the novel and play La Dame aux Camélias by Alexandre Dumas fils.

== Structure ==
That Ravel wanted to identify with Franz Schubert is clear. As he said himself, "The title sufficiently indicates my intention to compose a succession of waltzes, after Schubert's example." However, unlike Schubert (who actually wrote separately-grouped noble and sentimental waltzes that, while originally published separately, are frequently published together), Ravel did not differentiate the noble waltzes from the sentimental ones. Other than the name and the waltz form, there is little similarity between Ravel's and Schubert's works.

A typical performance of all eight waltzes takes 15 minutes. They are marked:

1. Modéré – très franc
2. Assez lent – avec une expression intense
3. Modéré
4. Assez animé
5. Presque lent – dans un sentiment intime
6. Vif
7. Moins vif
8. Épilogue: lent

The orchestration of the piece is written for an orchestra consisting of two flutes, two oboes, cor anglais, two clarinets (in B♭ and A), two bassoons, four horns (in F), two trumpets, three trombones, tuba, timpani, tambourine, cymbals, snare drum, glockenspiel, triangle, bass drum, celesta, two harps, and strings.
