= Kevin Bazzana =

Canadian music historian and biographer

Kevin John Bazzana
- Born: July 27, 1963 (age 63); Kelowna, British Columbia, Canada
- Occupation: Musical historian
- Writing career
- Genre: Non-fiction
- Subject: Biography

Kevin John Bazzana (born 1963) is a Canadian music historian and biographer, best known for his works on the Canadian pianist Glenn Gould. Bazzana is a graduate of the University of Victoria in British Columbia, Canada, and the University of California at Berkeley. He lives in Brentwood Bay, British Columbia.

== Literary career ==
Kevin Bazzana has written two books about Gould, Glenn Gould: The Performer in the Work (1997) and Wondrous Strange: The Life and Art of Glenn Gould (2003). The former's content came from Bazzana's doctoral dissertation on Gould, completed under the supervision of Richard Taruskin. Wondrous Strange was nominated for the 2004 Edna Staebler Award for Creative Non-Fiction. Bazzana also wrote a book about Hungarian pianist Ervin Nyiregyházi, Lost Genius: The Story of a Forgotten Musical Maverick (2007). Lost Genius was a nominee for the 2008 Charles Taylor Prize.

Bazzana also wrote the liner notes for the 2007 Zenph Studios Re-Performance CD Bach: The Goldberg Variations on Sony BMG.
