= Ma mère l'Oye =

Musical suite by Maurice Ravel

- by Maurice Ravel
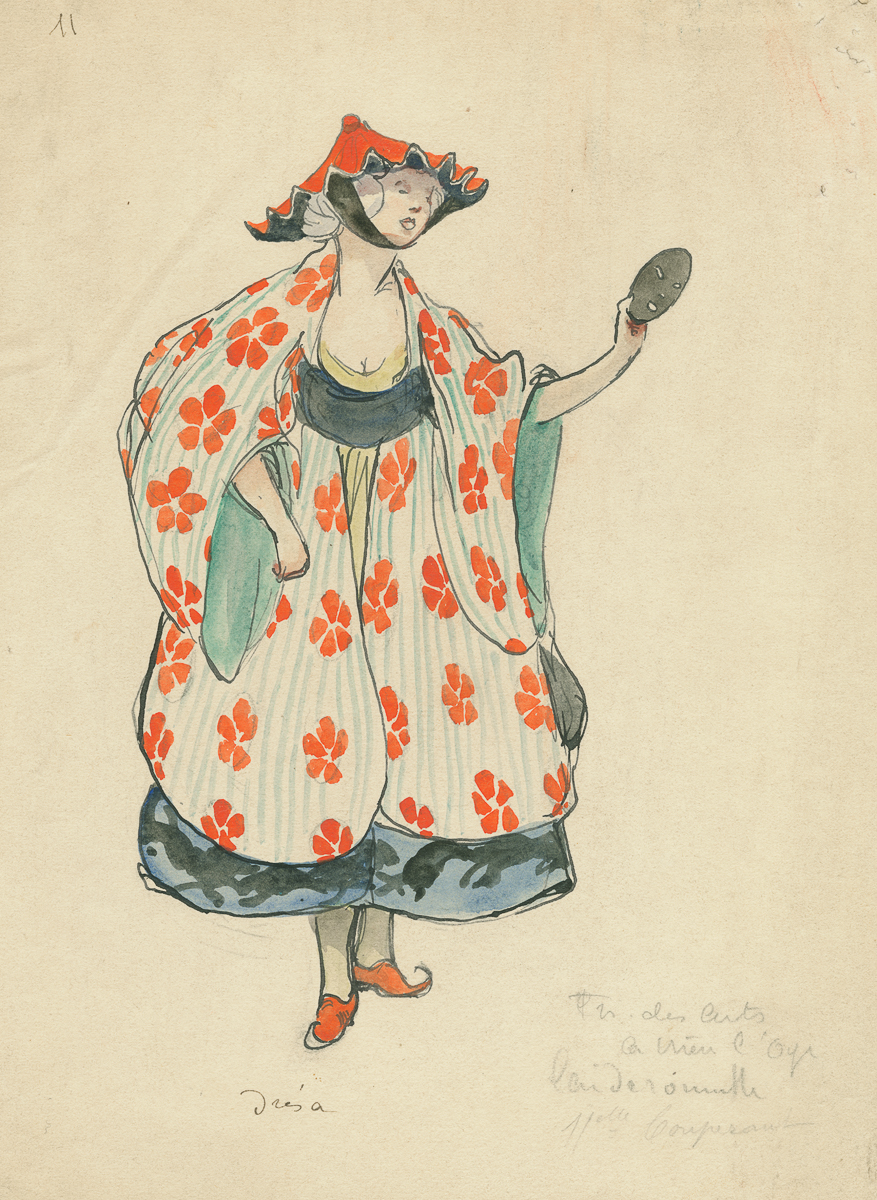
- Costume sketches for the ballet (Saglio, 1912)
- Dedication: Ida and Cipa Godebski
- Performed: 20 April 1910 (piano version) 29 January 1912 (ballet)
- Published: Éditions Durand, 1910
- Movements: five

Ma mère l'Oye (English: Mother Goose) is a suite by Maurice Ravel (1875-1937), based on Charles Perrault's tales Sleeping Beauty and Tom Thumb, which are drawn from Mother Goose Tales (1697), as well as on Madame Leprince de Beaumont's Beauty and the Beast (1757), and Madame d'Aulnoy's The Green Serpent (1697). There are three main versions of this suite: the first—the work's original form—which was written for piano four-hands; the second, following in the tradition of Ravel's orchestrations, is a score for symphony orchestra (1911); and the last—a more expanded version—is an adaptation for ballet, with choreography by Jane Hugard (1912).

== Piano versions ==
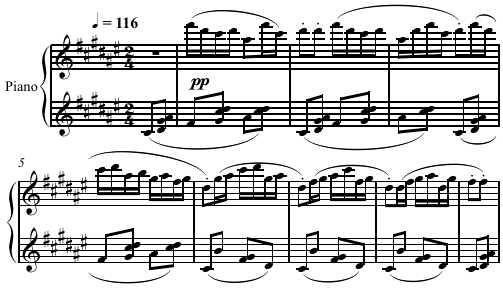
The opening of the third piece, Laideronnette, impératrice des pagodes (Little Ugly Girl, Empress of the Pagodas). These measures exhibit quartal harmony. The top line uses the pentatonic scale.

Ravel originally wrote Ma mère l'Oye as a piano duet for the children of his friends Ida and Cipa Godebski, Mimie and Jean, ages 6 and 7. Ravel dedicated this work for four hands to the children (just as he had dedicated an earlier work, Sonatine, to their parents). Jeanne Leleu (age 11) and Geneviève Durony (age 14 (10 by another source)) premiered the work at the first concert of the Société musicale indépendante on 20 April 1910.

Ma mère l'Oye bears witness to the composer's fondness—he remained a bachelor and childless—for "childlike" themes, a predilection also found later in L'enfant et les sortilèges (1925).

Ravel's friend Jacques Charlot transcribed the piece for solo piano the same year as it was published (1910); the first movement of Ravel's Le tombeau de Couperin was dedicated to Charlot's memory after his death in World War I.

Both piano versions bear the subtitle "cinq pièces enfantines" (five children's pieces). The five pieces are:

Pavane de la Belle au bois dormant (1:38)
Piano duet performed in 1992 by le Duo Campion/Vachon

1. Pavane de la Belle au bois dormant: Lent (Pavane of Sleeping Beauty)
2. Petit Poucet: Très modéré (Little Tom Thumb / Hop-o'-My-Thumb)
3. Laideronnette, impératrice des pagodes: Mouvement de marche (Little Ugly Girl, Empress of the Pagodas)
4. Les entretiens de la belle et de la bête: Mouvement de valse très modéré (Conversation of Beauty and the Beast)
5. Le jardin féerique: Lent et grave (The Fairy Garden)

Sleeping Beauty and Little Tom Thumb are based on the tales of Charles Perrault, while Little Ugly Girl, Empress of the Pagodas is inspired by a tale (The Green Serpent) by Perrault's "rival" Madame d'Aulnoy. Beauty and the Beast is based upon the version by Jeanne-Marie Le Prince de Beaumont. The origin of The Fairy Garden is not entirely known, although the ballet version interprets this as Sleeping Beauty being awakened in the garden by her prince.

On several of the scores, Ravel included quotes to indicate the characters and plot points he is trying to invoke. For example, for the second piece, he wrote:

Il croyait trouver aisément son chemin par le moyen de son pain qu'il avait semé partout où il avait passé; mais il fut bien surpris lorsqu'il ne put retrouver une seule miette: les oiseaux étaient venus qui avaient tout mangé.

He believed he'd easily find his way because of the bread that he'd strewn all along his path; but he was very surprised to find not a single crumb: the birds had come and eaten everything.

— Charles Perrault

== Orchestrated and ballet versions ==
In 1911, Ravel orchestrated the five-piece suite. This form is the most frequently heard today. The British premiere of Ma mère l'Oye occurred in this version on 27 August 1912 at the Promenade Concerts under the baton of Henry Wood.

Unlike Daphnis et Chloé, another Ravel composition, the composer utilized a reduced symphonic orchestra: the woodwind and horn sections are doubled, yet there are no trumpets, trombones, or tubas. Ma mère l'Oye has an almost chamber-like character, highlighting solo passages and subtle blends of timbre, evoking a distinctive and enchanting atmosphere of fairy tales and childhood.

At the behest of patron Jacques Rouché for his Théâtre des Arts, the work was subsequently transformed into a ballet, structured as five scenes in one act with a concluding apotheosis. Ravel added a prelude, a scene ("Spinning-Wheel Dance and Scene"), and four interludes; he also altered the order of the movements to perfect the dramatic progression. This adaptation—whose fantastical atmosphere lends itself ideally to the work's overall thematic content—ranks among Ravel's finest achievements in the choreographic genre. Its premiere, originally scheduled for the 25th (and later the 27th) of January, took place on 29 January 1912 under the musical direction of Gabriel Grovlez, with choreography by Jane Hugard and sets and costumes by Jacques Drésa (executed by Georges Mouveau).

The eleven numbers are:

1. Prélude – Très lent
2. Premier tableau – Danse du rouet et scène (Spinning wheel dance and scene)
3. Deuxième tableau – Pavane de la belle au bois dormant (Sleeping Beauty pavane)
4. Interlude
5. Troisième tableau – Les entretiens de la belle et de la bête (Dialogues of the Beauty and the Beast)
6. Interlude
7. Quatrième tableau – Petit Poucet (Hop-o'-My-Thumb)
8. Interlude
9. Cinquième tableau – Laideronnette, impératrice des Pagodes (Empress of the Pagodas)
10. Interlude
11. Sixième tableau – Le jardin féerique (The Fairy Garden)

Ravel did not arrange these new orchestral movements for piano four-hands, but this was instead done by Lucien Garban in 1919 (Prélude et Danse du rouet et scène).

=== Instrumentation ===
Ma mère l'Oye is scored for an orchestra with the following instruments:

Woodwinds
2 flutes (2nd doubling piccolo)
2 oboes (2nd doubling cor anglais)
2 clarinets in B♭ and A
2 bassoons (2nd doubling contrabassoon)

Brass
2 horns in F

Percussion
timpani

bass drum
cymbals
triangle
tamtam
xylophone
(snare drum in the ballet)

Keyboards
celesta
jeu de timbre

Strings

harp

violins I, II
violas
cellos
double basses

== In popular culture ==
- On his 1974 album, So What, American guitarist Joe Walsh recorded the first piano movement, which he simply titled "Pavanne", on the synthesizer.
- On his 1980 album, Bolero (also titled The Ravel Album), Japanese synthesizer artist Isao Tomita recorded the five movements of the piano version.
- In the 1984 TV short Jean Shepherd on Route 1... and Other Major Thoroughfares, an orchestral version of Le jardin féerique plays in the background while Shepherd narrates a segment about U.S. Route 22.
- The 1993 album Audrey Hepburn's Enchanted Tales includes selections from the suite.
- In the 2004 Japanese visual novel Clannad, and in the 2007 anime adaptation of the same name, the characters choose "Ma mére l'oye" (more specifically a section of "Petit Poucet: Très modéré") as the background music and theme for their school play.
- The 2017 film Call Me by Your Name makes extensive use of a section of Le jardin féerique,
- In the 2021 film The Worst Person in the World, a section of Les entretiens de la belle et de la bete plays while Julie freezes time to meet with Eivind at a cafe.
- The Korean Drama "Sky Castle" (2018-2019) employs Bolero and The Fairy Garden throughout the 20 episode saga.
- In Rick Owens' Fall/Winter 2024 women's show "Porterville", a looping synthesizer cover of the first movement was used throughout.
