= Gordana Lazarevich =

- Born: February 28, 1939 (age 87); Belgrade, Kingdom of Yugoslavia
- Occupations: Musicologist, professor, pianist

Gordana Lazarevich (born February 28, 1939) is a Canadian pianist, musicologist and former department head at the University of Victoria.

== Background and education ==
Gordana Lazarevich was born in 1939, in Belgrade, Serbia. She immigrated to Canada in 1957. Lazarevich obtained her masters diploma from Juilliard in 1964 and her doctorate from Columbia University in 1970.

== Career ==
Lazarevich became director of the School of Music at the University of Victoria in 1986. Prior to that, she was director of graduate studies in music at the same university. She has written about various musicians and musical genres, specializing in 18th century and 19th century music. In 1970, Columbia University published her dissertation "The Role of the Neapolitan Intermezzo in the Evolution of Eighteenth-century Musical Style". A book on Frances James and Murray Adaskin was published in 1988. She also edited "L'Artigiano Gentiluomo : Recent researches in the music of the Classical Era". Lazarevich contributed to magazines such as Current Musicology, The Musical Quarterly and Analecta Musicologica, as well as The New Grove Dictionary.

As a pianist, Lazarevich performed with the Toronto Symphony Orchestra and also appeared on CBC Radio and Television. Her other recitals were at venues like the Canadian National Exhibition and the Toronto Art Gallery.

== Awards ==
In 1959, Lazarevich won the CBC Trans-Canada Talent Festival in the piano category.
