= Alberto Guerrero =

Chilean composer & pianist (1886–1959)

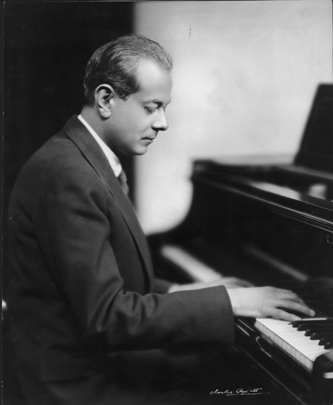
- Alberto Guerrero in 1930s

Background information
- Born: Antonio Alberto García Guerrero; February 6, 1886; La Serena, Chile
- Died: November 7, 1959 (aged 73) Toronto, Ontario, Canada

Antonio Alberto García Guerrero (February 6, 1886 – November 7, 1959) was a Chilean composer, pianist, and teacher. While he is most famously remembered as the mentor of Canadian pianist Glenn Gould, Guerrero influenced several generations of musicians through his many years of teaching at the Toronto Conservatory of Music.

== Biography ==
Born in La Serena, Chile, Guerrero first studied piano with his mother and older brother Daniel; he was otherwise self-taught. After the family moved to Santiago in the early 1890s, he became part of a group of artists and intellectuals who called themselves Los Diez. A resourceful composer and talented concert pianist, Guerrero had a reform-minded influence on Chilean musical life. His brother Eduardo became a music critic, and Alberto contributed articles and reviews to the newspaper El diario ilustrado. He published a treatise in 1915 entitled La armonia moderna (now lost).

Guerrero introduced Chilean audiences to the modern music of his day, including works by Debussy, Ravel, Cyril Scott, Scriabin, and Schoenberg. He founded and conducted Santiago's first symphony orchestra and was active in founding the Sociedad Bach in 1917.

In 1918, during a honeymoon trip to New York City, Guerrero came in contact with members of the Hambourg family, who invited him to teach at the recently established Hambourg Conservatory in Toronto. Guerrero accepted this position and emigrated to Canada with his wife and daughter the following year.

In Toronto, Guerrero performed for a few years with the Hambourg Trio (having replaced pianist Mark Hambourg). While he shifted his focus to piano technique and pedagogy, he expanded his performing repertory to include works from Purcell through Les Six. As one of Canada's most active pianists, he played regular radio recitals (a highly innovative move at the time) beginning in the mid-1920s and through to the early 1950s. He also initiated a subscription series of solo recitals from 1932 to 1937. Each season had four or five recitals, and often covered neglected works by Bach, Alessandro Scarlatti, Haydn, Mozart, 18th-century Spanish composers, 20th-century French composers, and Stravinsky. Bach pieces included the complete inventions and sinfonias, as well as the Goldberg Variations, all of which were later popularized by his pupil Glenn Gould. Guerrero performed in various chamber ensembles with musicians including Frank Blachford (violin), Leo Smith (cello), Harold Sumberg (violin), and Cornelius Ysselstyn (cello). For over a decade, he was also a member of the Five Piano Ensemble.

In 1922, Guerrero left the Hambourg Conservatory and joined the Toronto Conservatory of Music (Royal Conservatory of Music), where he remained until his death in Toronto in 1959, having established himself as one of Canada's preeminent music teachers.

Guerrero was known to be quiet and focused. His near self-effacement gave rise to some of the most prominent Canadian musicians of the late 20th century. He had a decisive technical and aesthetic influence on Glenn Gould, whom he mentored for 10 years, even though Gould later claimed to be self-taught. Guerrero was also known for his keen intellect and eloquence vis-à-vis painting, poetry, and philosophy (Comte, Husserl, Sartre). "He was one of the few musicians from whom a student would get a vista of ideas beyond music", recalls composer R. Murray Schafer, who composed In Memoriam Alberto Guerrero a few months after his teacher's death.

== Compositions ==
Guerrero had been known as a versatile composer in Santiago. In addition to a number of chamber works and piano solos, he wrote music for 4 or 5 operettas and zarzuelas (now lost) which were produced in Chile between 1908 and 1915. However, after moving to Canada, Guerrero focused more on teaching, though a couple of piano works (Tango and Southern Seas) were published in 1937. He also collaborated with his second wife Myrtle Rose Guerrero to co-author The New Approach to the Piano (2 vols., 1935–36).

== Students ==
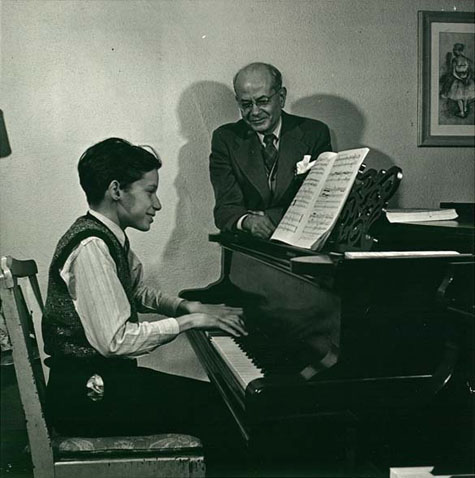
Alberto Guerrero (standing) with his student Glenn Gould, Toronto c. 1947

As a prominent member of the music circles in Santiago and later at the Toronto Conservatory of Music, Guerrero influenced generations of students who would go on to shape the musical life of Chile, Canada, and beyond. What follows is an incomplete list:

- William Aide
- John Beckwith
- Joan Bell
- Helmut Blume
- Gayle Sharlene Brown
- Gwendoly Duchemin
- Ray Dudley
- Jeanette Fujarczuk
- Dorothy Sandler Glick
- Glenn Gould
- Myrtle Rose Guerrero (2nd wife)
- Stuart Hamilton
- Paul Helmer
- Ruth Watson Henderson
- Horace Lapp
- Edward Laufer
- Gordana Lazarevich
- Pierrette LePage
- Jean Lyons
- Edward Magee
- Ursula Malkin
- Bruce Mather
- Grace Irene Hunt McDonald
- John McIntyre
- Gordon McLean
- Gerald Moore
- Oscar Morawetz
- Laurence Morton
- Arthur Ozolins
- Patricio Pizarro
- George Ross
- R. Murray Schafer
- Oleg Telizyn
- Malcolm Troup
- Neil Van Allen
- Domingo Santa Cruz Wilson

== Recordings ==
- Glenn Gould: His First Recordings (1947–1952). Video Artists International 1198 (2001).

== Bibliography ==
- Beckwith, John (2006). In Search of Alberto Guerrero. Wilfrid Laurier University Press. ISBN 0-88920-496-9. The only book-length biography of Guerrero.
- Aide, William (1998). Starting from Porcupine. Oberon Press. ISBN 0-7780-1047-3.

Archive collection

An archive collection of Guerrero's manuscripts and papers is located at the University of Toronto Music Library.
