= Michel Merlet =

French composer and pedagogue (1939–2026)

Michel Merlet (26 May 1939 – 3 May 2026) was a French composer and pedagogue.

== Life and career ==
Michel Merlet was born in Saint-Brieuc, France in 1939. Merlet studied music at the Conservatoire de Paris, where his teacher was Tony Aubin. There he won prizes for harpsichord, chamber music, counterpoint, fugue, musical composition and musical analysis (in Olivier Messiaen's class). From 1978, he taught fugue there, succeeding Yvonne Desportes at this post. He won the Grand Prix de Rome in 1966.

In 1979, he was in charge of teaching music writing at the International Japanese Summer Academy, and from 1985, he taught writing, orchestration, analysis and composition in China at the Shanghai Conservatory and the Beijing Conservatory. He was a professor of composition at the École Normale de Musique de Paris and at the Schola Cantorum de Paris. In 1995, invited to Greece, he taught composition and orchestration at the Athens Conservatoire. In 2001, the "European American Musical Alliance" commissioned him to conduct masterclasses for students at several universities in the United States, including the Juilliard School.

His music was championed by the French pianist Jean-Claude Pennetier.

Merlet was a member of the juries of numerous international competitions, including the Long-Thibaud-Crespin Competition.

Merlet died in Soisy-sous-Montmorency on 3 May 2026, at the age of 86.

== Selected works ==
- Prélude for piano, 1961
- Gravitations for voice and piano, 1962
- Suite for oboe, clarinet and bassoon, 1962
- Sonate for violin and piano, 1963
- Trio à cordes (theme and variations), 1963
- Diptyque, for clarinet and piano, 1963
- Sonatine for piano, 1966
- Huit études for string quartet, 1965
- Triptyque symphonique, 1965
- En tous sens for flute and piano, 1966
- Stabile for clarinet and piano, 1967
- Musique for two pianos, 1967
- Monde s'ouvre for trumpet and piano, 1967
- Sonatine en trois mouvements for flute and piano, 1968
- Hommage à Manuel De Falla for harpsichord, 1969
- Divertimento da camera for String Orchestra, 1970
- Ils étaient trois petits enfants for vocal quartet, flute, two clarinets and bassoon, 1970
- Chacone for flute and piano, 1970
- Passacaille for harp, 1971
- Images pour les contes du Chat Perché for concert accordion, 1972
- Jeu de cartes for piano, 1973
- Musique de scène for cello, 1974
- Trio for piano, flute and cello, 1974
- Moirures, symphonic poem for orchestra, 1976
- Discours sur la méthode for piano for four hands, 1977
- Tétrassonances for oboe and piano, 1977
- Psalmos for String Orchestra, 1978
- Une soirée à Nohant for cello and piano, 1979
- Concert in quatro for violin and string orchestra, 1979
- Une soirée à Nohant for cello and string orchestra, 1979
- Vingt-quatre préludes for piano, 1981
- Variations for saxophone quartet, 1981
- Mini-suite for piano, 1982
- Quatuor à cordes, 1983–85
- Concerto for piano and String Orchestra, 1984
- Passacaille et fugue for piano, 1986
- Ostinato for viola and piano, 1986
- Cinq motets a cappella, 1987
- Prélude-Interlude-Postlude for cello and piano, 1988
- Concerto for two pianos and orchestra, 1989–92
- Suite for String Trio, 1990
- Étude miroir for harp sextet, 1994
- Roque de sol-ut-ré for flute, 1995
- Six études for violin, 1997–99
- Six études symphoniques for piano, 2000
- Pièce for balalaika and piano, 2001

== Awards and honors ==
- 1er Grand Prix International de la Guilde du disque (1965)
- Grand Prix de Rome (1966)
- Prix National Pineau-Chaillou (1966)
- Prix Jacques-Durand, awarded by the Institut de France (1974)
- Prix Chartier, awarded by the Institut de France (1976)
- Prix Stéphane-Chapelier, awarded by the SACEM (1977)
- Prix International de Naples (1987)
- Merlet was a Chevalier of the Ordre des Arts et des Lettres.

== Recordings ==
- Le Trio, opus 24, la sonate pour piano et violon et Une soirée à Nohant ont été enregistrés par Pascal Devoyon, Jean-Jacques Kantorow and Philippe Muller during the 1980s. (Cybelia, CY 713, réédition Integral Classic)
- Éric Heidsieck a enregistré les 24 Préludes pour piano
- Matthew Odell a enregistré Passacaille et fugue, Op. 36 et Jeu de quartes pour piano (Albany, 2019)

== Sources ==
- Hinson, Maurice; Roberts, Wesley (2013). Guide to the Pianist's Repertoire (4th ed.). Bloomington: Indiana University Press. ISBN 978-0-253-01023-0.
