= So You Want to Write a Fugue? =

Composition by Glenn Gould

"So You Want to Write a Fugue?" is a satirical composition for four voices and string quartet or four voices and piano accompaniment. It was composed by the Canadian pianist Glenn Gould and was a final piece for the television show The Anatomy of Fugue, which was broadcast on March 4, 1963 by the Canadian Broadcasting Corporation.

== Context ==
The work is the result of Gould’s intense study of the compositions of Johann Sebastian Bach, in particular Bach's late work The Art of Fugue, excerpts of which Gould had recorded in 1962. Structurally the piece is modeled on just such a Bach Fugue. The text, however, was written on the subject "So you want to write a fugue?" Both the text and the music are parodies of the rules and compositional techniques of the genre, as well as the relationship between intellectual methods and artistic intuition in the creative process (e.g., "Just forget the rules, and write one"). Lyrically, the 5-minute piece concludes tongue-in-cheek with the decision to "write a fugue right now!" The piece contains numerous quotes from various works of classical music, including the famous sequence of notes B-A-C-H, the Second Brandenburg Concerto by J. S. Bach, Beethoven's Sixth Symphony, and Richard Wagner's Die Meistersinger von Nürnberg (altered from major mode to minor).

== Text ==
"So you want to write a fugue?
You've got the urge to write a fugue
You've got the nerve to write a fugue
So go ahead and write a fugue that we can sing
Pay no heed to what we've told you
Give no mind to what we've told you
Just forget all that we've told you
And the theory that you've read
For the only way to write one
Is just to plunge right in and write one
So just forget the rules and write one
Have a try, yes, try to write a fugue
So just ignore the rules and try
And the fun of it will get you
And the joy of it will fetch you
It's a pleasure that is bound to satisfy
So why not have a try?
You'll decide that John Sebastian
Must have been a very personable guy
But never be clever for the sake of being clever
For a canon in inversion is a dangerous diversion
And a bit of augmentation is a serious temptation
While a stretto diminution is an obvious solution
Never be clever for the sake of being clever
For the sake of showing off
It's rather awesome, isn't it?
And when you've finished writing it
I think you'll find a great joy in it (hope so)
Well, nothing ventured, nothing gained, they say
But still it is rather hard to start
Well, let us try
Right now? (yes, why not)
We're going to write a fugue
We're going to write a good one
We're going to write a fugue right now!

== Publications ==
- Glenn Gould: So You Want to Write a Fugue? New York: Schirmer, 1964.

== Discography ==
- The Glenn Gould Edition: Gould, Schostakowitsch, Poulenc, Scl (Sony BMG), 1997.
- The Glenn Gould Silver Jubilee Album, Scl (Sony BMG), 1998.

== Literature ==
- Glenn Gould (1986), So you want to write a fugue? (In: Von Bach bis Boulez. Schriften zur Musik I) (in German), München: Piper, ISBN 3-492-03008-4
