= Glenn Gould =

Canadian pianist (1932–1982)

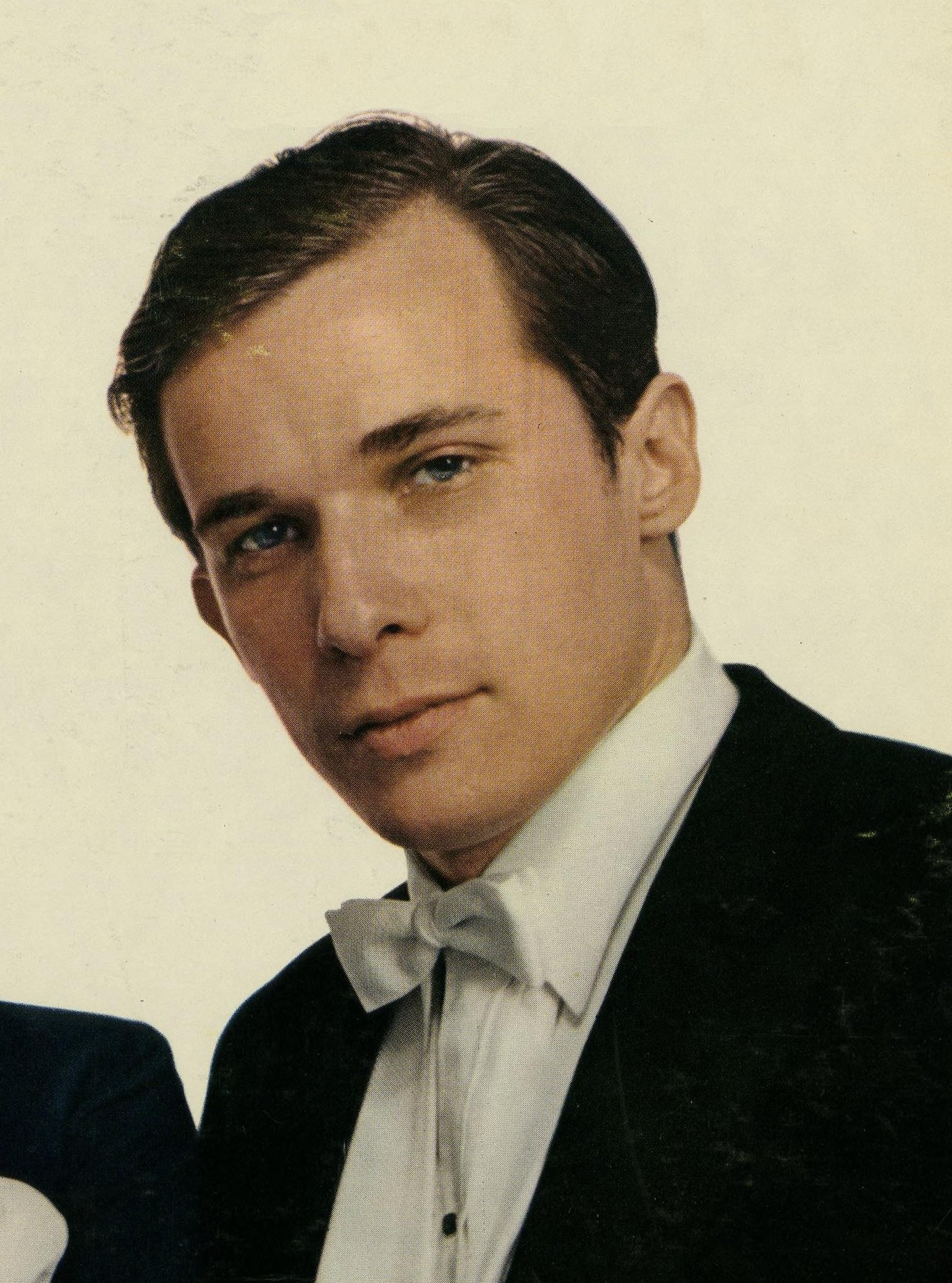
- Gould c. 1961
- Born: Glenn Herbert Gold; 25 September 1932; Toronto, Ontario, Canada
- Died: 4 October 1982 (aged 50); Toronto, Ontario, Canada
- Burial place: Mount Pleasant Cemetery, Toronto
- Education: Royal Conservatory of Music
- Occupation: Pianist
- Awards: Companion of the Order of Canada (declined by Gould); Grammy Lifetime Achievement Award (2013); Grammy Awards: 1973, 1982, 1983; Juno Awards: 1979, 1983, 1984; Canadian Music Hall of Fame; National Historic Person
- Musical career
- Genres: Western classical music, electronic music
- Instruments: Piano; organ; tape
- Years active: 1945–1982
- Labels: Columbia Masterworks; CBC Records
- Website: glenngould.com

Glenn Herbert Gould (Note: Bazzana (2003, p. 27) states, "Gould's first name is frequently misspelled as 'Glen' in documents (including official ones) dating back to the beginning of his life, and Gould himself used both spellings interchangeably throughout his life." Bazzana (2003, p. 24) further investigated the name-change records in Ontario's Office of the Registrar General and found only a record of his father Bert's name-change to Gould in 1979 (to be able to legally marry with that name); he concludes that the family's name-change was informal and "Gould was still legally 'Glenn Herbert Gold' when he died.") (/ɡuːld/; né Gold; (Note: According to Bazzana (2003, p. 24), "[Gould's] birth certificate gave his name as 'Gold, Glenn Herbert.' The family name had always been Gold [...] All of the documents through 1938 that survive among Gould's papers give his surname as 'Gold,' but beginning at least as early as June 1939, the family name was almost always printed 'Gould' in newspapers, programs, and other sources; the last confirmed publication of 'Gold' is in the program for a church supper and concert on 27 October 1940. The whole family adopted the new surname.") 25 September 1932 – 4 October 1982) was a Canadian pianist and broadcaster. Regarded as one of the greatest pianists of the 20th century, he was renowned as an interpreter of the keyboard works of Johann Sebastian Bach. His playing was distinguished by remarkable technical proficiency and a capacity to articulate the contrapuntal texture of Bach's music.

Gould rejected most of the Romantic piano literature—Chopin, Schumann, Liszt, Rachmaninoff, and others—in favour of Bach and Beethoven mainly, along with some late-Romantic and modernist composers. Gould also recorded pre-Baroque composers such as Jan Pieterszoon Sweelinck, William Byrd, and Orlando Gibbons; Classical composers such as Haydn, Mozart, and Brahms; and 20th-century composers including Paul Hindemith, Arnold Schoenberg, Alexander Scriabin, and Richard Strauss. He championed Gibbons, whom he called his favorite composer.

Gould was also a writer and broadcaster, and dabbled in composition and conducting. He produced television programmes about classical music, in which he spoke, performed, and interacted with interviewers in a scripted manner. He made three musique concrète radio documentaries, the Solitude Trilogy, about isolated areas of Canada. He was a prolific contributor to music journals, in which he discussed music theory. Gould was known for his eccentricities, ranging from his unorthodox musical interpretations and mannerisms at the keyboard to aspects of his lifestyle and behaviour. He disliked public performance, and stopped giving concerts at age 31 to concentrate on studio recording and media. His recording of the Prelude and Fugue in C major (BWV 870) from The Well Tempered Clavier, Book 2 is on the Voyager Golden Record, a sample of the sights and sounds of Earth sent into space with the Voyager probes. He is the subject of Thirty Two Short Films About Glenn Gould (1993) and Genius Within: The Inner Life of Glenn Gould (2009).

== Life ==
=== Early life ===
Glenn Gould was born at home at 32 Southwood Drive in The Beaches, Toronto, on 25 September 1932, the only child of Russell Herbert Gold and Florence Emma Gold (née Greig, a distant relative of the Norwegian composer and pianist Edvard Grieg), Presbyterians of Scottish, English, German, and Norwegian ancestry. The family's surname was informally changed to Gould around 1939 to avoid being mistaken for Jewish, given the prevailing antisemitism of prewar Toronto. (Note: Full circumstances of the name-change can be found in Bazzana (2003, pp. 24–26).) Gould had no Jewish ancestry, (Note: According to Bazzana (2003, p. 27), "At least as far back as the mid-eighteenth century, there were no Jews in this particular Gold lineage.") though he sometimes joked about it, saying, "When people ask me if I'm Jewish, I always tell them that I was Jewish during the war."

Gould's interest in music and his talent as a pianist were evident very early. Both parents were musical; his mother taught him the piano and encouraged his musical development from infancy. Hoping he would become a successful musician, she exposed him to music during her pregnancy. As a baby, he reportedly hummed instead of crying and wiggled his fingers as if playing a keyboard instrument. This led his doctor to predict he would be "either a physician or a pianist". He learned to read music before he could read words, and it was observed that he had perfect pitch at age three. When presented with a piano, the young Gould was reported to strike single notes and listen to their long decay, a practice his father Bert noted was different from typical children. Gould's interest in the piano was concomitant with an interest in composition. He played his pieces for family, friends, and sometimes large gatherings—including, in 1938, a performance at the Emmanuel Presbyterian Church (a few blocks from the Gould family home) of one of his compositions.

Gould first heard a live musical performance, by the pianist Josef Hofmann, at age six. This profoundly affected him. He later described the experience:

It was Hofmann. It was, I think, his last performance in Toronto, and it was a staggering impression. The only thing I can really remember is that, when I was being brought home in a car, I was in that wonderful state of half-awakeness in which you hear all sorts of incredible sounds going through your mind. They were all orchestral sounds, but I was playing them all, and suddenly I was Hofmann. I was enchanted.

At age 10, he began attending the Toronto Conservatory of Music in Toronto (known since 1947 as The Royal Conservatory of Music). He studied music theory with Leo Smith, organ with Frederick C. Silvester, and piano with Alberto Guerrero. Around the same time, he injured his back as a result of a fall from a boat ramp on the shore of Lake Simcoe. (Note: Friedrich (1990, p. 27) dates this incident on the basis of a discussion with Gould's father, who is cited by Friedrich as stating that it occurred "when the boy was about ten".) This incident is apocryphally related to the adjustable-height chair his father made shortly thereafter. Gould's mother would urge the young Gould to sit up straight at the keyboard. He used this chair for the rest of his life, taking it with him almost everywhere. The chair was designed so that Gould could sit very low and allowed him to pull down on the keys rather than striking them from above, a central technical idea of Guerrero's.

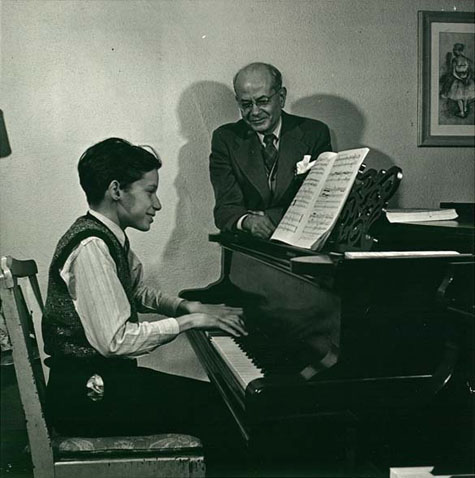
Gould with his teacher, Alberto Guerrero, at the Royal Conservatory of Music in Toronto, in 1945. Guerrero demonstrated his technical idea that Gould should "pull down" at the keys instead of striking them from above.

Gould developed a technique that enabled him to choose a very fast tempo while retaining the "separateness" and clarity of each note. His extremely low position at the instrument permitted him more control over the keyboard. Gould showed considerable technical skill in performing and recording a wide repertoire including virtuosic and romantic works, such as his own arrangement of Ravel's La valse and Liszt's transcriptions of Beethoven's Fifth and Sixth Symphonies. Gould worked from a young age with Guerrero on a technique known as finger-tapping: a method of training the fingers to act more independently from the arm.

Gould passed his final Conservatory examination in piano at age 12, achieving the highest marks of any candidate, and thus attaining professional standing as a pianist. One year later he passed the written theory exams, qualifying for an Associate of the Toronto Conservatory of Music (ATCM) diploma. (Note: ATCM is Associate, Toronto Conservatory of Music. The Conservatory received its royal charter in 1947 and became The Royal Conservatory of Music.)

Gould's childhood neighbour and lifelong best friend was Robert Fulford, who became a prominent journalist and essayist. In 1952, Fulford and Gould founded New Music Associates, which produced and promoted Gould's first three public performances, including Gould's debut performance of J. S. Bach's Goldberg Variations.

=== Piano ===
Gould was a child prodigy and was described in adulthood as a musical phenomenon. (Note: During Gould's 1957 concert performances in Moscow, Vladimir Ashkenazy labelled him a phenomenon (Till & Tovell 1985).) He claimed to have almost never practised on the piano itself, preferring to study repertoire by reading, (Note: In their documentary film Glenn Gould: A Portrait (Till & Tovell 1985), Glenn Gould's father recalled that Glenn "would not come out [of his bedroom] until he memorized the whole music" [regarding one of Beethoven's piano concertos].) another technique he had learned from Guerrero. He may have spoken ironically about his practising though, as there is evidence that on occasion he did practise quite hard, sometimes using his own drills and techniques. (Note: In outtakes of the Goldberg Variations, Gould describes his practising technique by composing a drill on Variation 11, remarking that he is "still sloppy" and with his usual humour that "a little practising is in order." He is also heard practising other parts of the Goldbergs.) He seemed able to practise mentally, once preparing for a recording of Brahms's piano works without playing them until a few weeks before the sessions. Gould could play a vast repertoire of piano music, as well as a wide range of orchestral and operatic transcriptions, from memory. He could "memorize at sight" and once challenged a friend to name any piece of music that he could not "instantly play from memory".

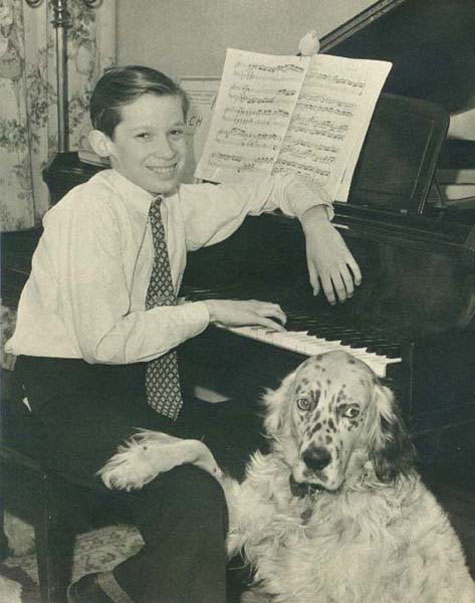
Gould in February 1946 with his dog, Nicky, and his parakeet, Mozart

The piano, Gould said, "is not an instrument for which I have any great love as such ... [but] I have played it all my life, and it is the best vehicle I have to express my ideas." In the case of Bach, Gould noted, "[I] fixed the action in some of the instruments I play on—and the piano I use for all recordings is now so fixed—so that it is a shallower and more responsive action than the standard. It tends to have a mechanism which is rather like an automobile without power steering: you are in control and not it; it doesn't drive you, you drive it. This is the secret of doing Bach on the piano at all. You must have that immediacy of response, that control over fine definitions of things."

As a teenager, Gould was significantly influenced by Artur Schnabel, (Note: Gould: "The piano was a means to an end for him, and the end was to approach Beethoven." See Tovell (1959) 07:40 minutes in.) Rosalyn Tureck's recordings of Bach (which he called "upright, with a sense of repose and positiveness"), and the conductor Leopold Stokowski. He recalled, "It was playing of such uprightness, to put it into the moral sphere." Gould was known for his vivid imagination. Listeners regarded his interpretations as ranging from brilliantly creative to outright eccentric. His pianism had great clarity and erudition, particularly in contrapuntal passages, and extraordinary control. Gould believed the piano to be "a contrapuntal instrument" and his whole approach to music was centered in the Baroque. Much of the homophony that followed he felt belongs to a less serious and less spiritual period of art.

Gould had a pronounced aversion to what he termed "hedonistic" approaches to piano repertoire, performance, and music generally. For him, "hedonism" in this sense denoted a superficial theatricality, something to which he felt Mozart, for example, became increasingly susceptible later in his career. He associated this drift toward hedonism with the emergence of a cult of showmanship and gratuitous virtuosity on the concert platform in the 19th century and later. The institution of the public concert, he felt, degenerated into the "blood sport" with which he struggled, and which he ultimately rejected.

=== Performances and recordings ===
On 5 June 1938, at age five, Gould played in public for the first time, joining his family on stage to play piano at a church service at the Business Men's Bible Class in Uxbridge, Ontario, in front of a congregation of about 2,000. In 1945, at 13, he made his first appearance with an orchestra in a performance of the first movement of Beethoven's 4th Piano Concerto with the Toronto Symphony. His first solo concert followed in 1947, and his first recital on radio was with the CBC in 1950. This was the beginning of Gould's long association with radio and recording. He founded the Festival Trio chamber group in 1953 and appeared at the inaugural Stratford Festival with cellist Isaac Mamott and violinist Albert Pratz.

External images
- Glenn Gould performing at the piano in Toronto, Canada, in 1956
- Glenn Gould, c. 1960s, with Leonard Bernstein and Igor Stravinsky in rehearsal with the New York Philharmonic

Gould made his American debut on 2 January 1955, in Washington, D.C. at The Phillips Collection. The music critic Paul Hume wrote in The Washington Post: "January 2 is early for predictions, but it is unlikely that the year 1955 will bring us a finer piano recital than that played yesterday afternoon in the Phillips Gallery. We shall be lucky if it brings us others of equal beauty and significance." A performance at The Town Hall in New York City followed on 11 January. Gould's reputation quickly grew.

Also in 1955, Gould recorded Bach's Goldberg Variations. The recording built Gould's reputation both in North America and internationally and led to concert tours of Europe and the Soviet Union.

In 1957, he undertook a tour of the Soviet Union, becoming the first North American to play there since World War II. His concerts featured Bach, Beethoven, and the serial music of Schoenberg and Berg, which had been suppressed in the Soviet Union during the era of Socialist Realism.

Gould performed Beethoven's Piano Concerto No. 3 with Herbert von Karajan conducting the Berlin Philharmonic Orchestra in Berlin on 26 May 1957. Gould debuted in Boston in 1958, playing for the Peabody Mason Concert Series. On 31 January 1960, Gould first appeared on American television on CBS's Ford Presents series, performing Bach's Keyboard Concerto No. 1 in D minor (BWV 1052) with Leonard Bernstein conducting the New York Philharmonic.

On 7 August 1960, Gould and cellist Leonard Rose performed Beethoven's Cello and Piano Sonata No. 3 Op. 69 at the Stratford Festival in Stratford, Ontario, Canada. On the same program, Gould and Rose were joined by violinist Oscar Shumsky for a performance of Beethoven's Ghost Trio.

On 8 November 1960, Gould performed Beethoven's Emperor Concerto with the Buffalo Philharmonic Orchestra conducted by Josef Krips.

In March 1961, Gould performed and recorded Beethoven's Piano Concerto No. 4 with Bernstein and the New York Philharmonic Orchestra.

On 1 and 4 March 1966, at Manhattan Center, in New York, Gould recorded Beethoven's Piano Concerto No. 5 with Leopold Stokowski conducting the American Symphony Orchestra.

In 1962, Gould performed the Brahms Piano Concerto No. 1 in D minor with the New York Philharmonic conducted by Bernstein. Despite the controversy surrounding Bernstein's remarks before the performance, Gould regarded it as a major success.

Although Gould's live performances were outstandingly successful, he came to believe that the institution of the public concert was an anachronism and a "force of evil", leading to his early retirement from concert performance. He argued that public performance devolved into a sort of competition, with a non-empathetic audience mostly attendant to the possibility of the performer erring or failing critical expectation, and that such performances produced unexceptional interpretations because of the limitations of live music. He set forth this doctrine, half in jest, in "GPAADAK", the Gould Plan for the Abolition of Applause and Demonstrations of All Kinds. On 10 April 1964, he gave his last concert performance, at Los Angeles's Wilshire Ebell Theater. Among the pieces he performed were Beethoven's Piano Sonata No. 30, selections from Bach's The Art of Fugue, and Hindemith's Piano Sonata No. 3. (Note: Friedrich first states that Gould performed the Beethoven Piano Sonata No. 30 (Opus 109) Friedrich (1990, p. 108) but later states that he performed the Beethoven Piano Sonata No. 31 (Opus 110) Friedrich (1990, p. 354). Bazzana (2003, p. 229) cites Beethoven Piano Sonata No. 30 (Opus 109).) Gould performed fewer than 200 concerts, of which fewer than 40 were outside Canada. For a pianist such as Van Cliburn, 200 concerts would have amounted to about two years' touring.

One of Gould's reasons for abandoning live performance was his aesthetic preference for the recording studio, where, in his words, he developed a "love affair with the microphone". (Note: Originally published in Piano Quarterly in 1974. Reprinted and quoted in Kingwell (2009, p. 159) and Kieser (1993). See Album details at world catalogue.) There, he could control every aspect of the final musical product by selecting parts of various takes. He felt that he could realize a musical score more fully this way. Gould felt strongly that there was little point in re-recording centuries-old pieces if the performer had no new perspective to bring. For the rest of his life, he eschewed live performance, focusing instead on recording, writing, and broadcasting.

=== Eccentricities ===
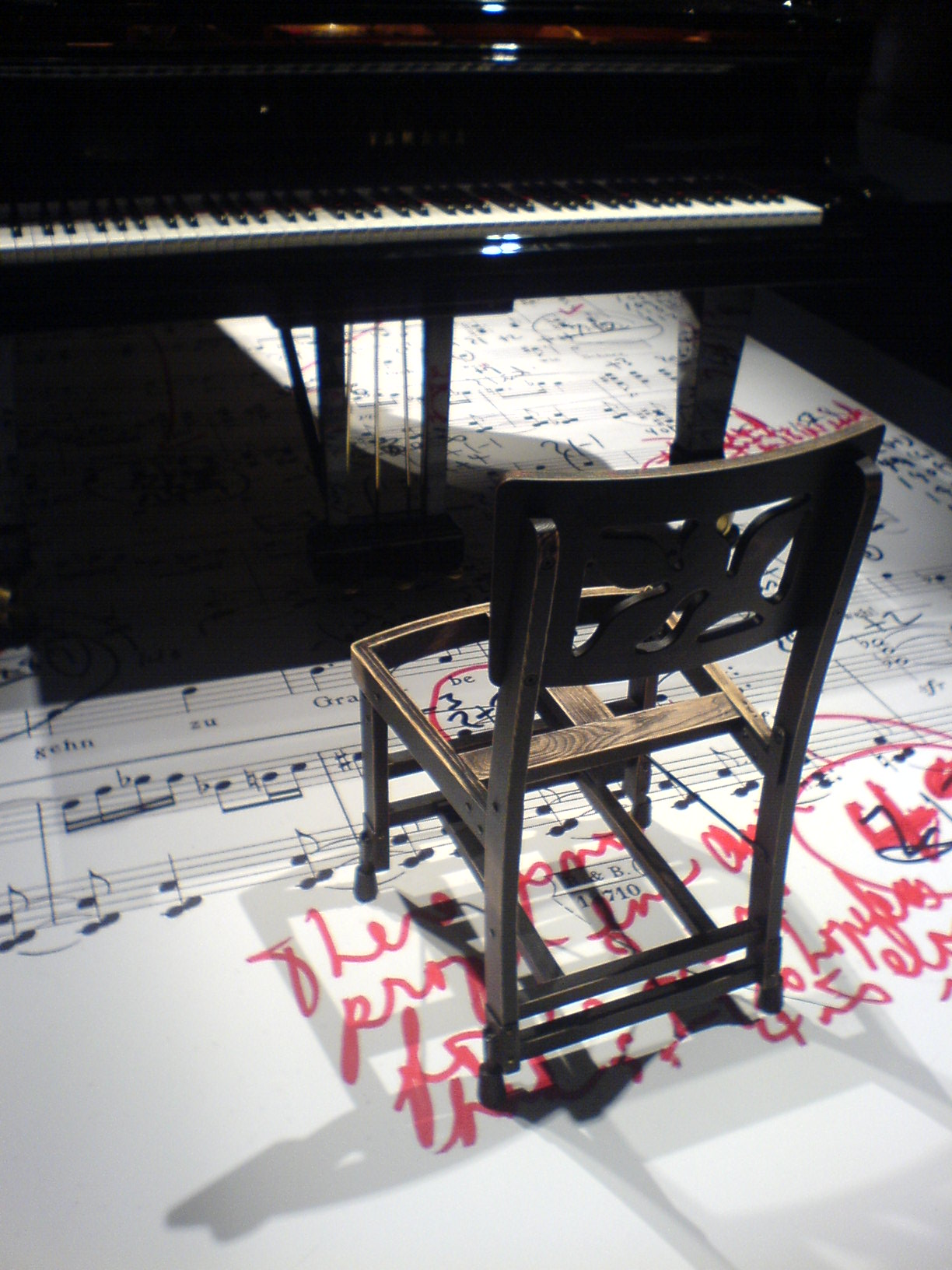
Replica of Gould's piano chair

Gould was widely known for his unusual habits. He often hummed or sang while he played, and his audio engineers were not always able to exclude his voice from recordings. Gould claimed that his singing was unconscious and increased in proportion to his inability to produce his intended interpretation on a given piano. It is likely that the habit originated in his having been taught by his mother to "sing everything that he played", as his biographer Kevin Bazzana wrote. This became "an unbreakable (and notorious) habit". Some of Gould's recordings were severely criticised because of this background "vocalising". For example, a reviewer of his 1981 rerecording of The Goldberg Variations wrote that many listeners would "find the groans and croons intolerable". Gould was known for his peculiar, even theatrical, gesticulations while playing. Another oddity was his insistence on absolute control over every aspect of his environment. The temperature of the recording studio had to be precisely regulated; he invariably insisted that it be extremely warm. According to another of Gould's biographers, Otto Friedrich, the air-conditioning engineer had to work just as hard as the recording engineers.

The piano had to be set at a certain height and would be raised on wooden blocks if necessary. A rug would sometimes be required for his feet. He had to sit exactly 14 inches (360 mm) above the floor, and would play concerts only with the chair his father had made. He continued to use the chair even when its seat was completely worn, and became so closely identified with it that it is displayed in a glass case at Library and Archives Canada.

Conductors had mixed responses to Gould and his playing habits. George Szell, who led Gould in 1957 with the Cleveland Orchestra, remarked to his assistant, "That nut's a genius." Leonard Bernstein said, "There is nobody quite like him, and I just love playing with him." Bernstein created a stir at the concert of April 6, 1962, when, just before the New York Philharmonic was to perform the Brahms Piano Concerto No. 1 in D minor with Gould, he informed the audience that he was assuming no responsibility for what they were about to hear. He asked the audience: "In a concerto, who is the boss – the soloist or the conductor?" to which the audience laughed. "The answer is, of course, sometimes the one and sometimes the other, depending on the people involved." Specifically, Bernstein was referring to their rehearsals, with Gould's insistence that the entire first movement be played at half the indicated tempo. The speech was interpreted by Harold C. Schonberg, music critic for The New York Times, as an abdication of responsibility and an attack on Gould. Plans for a studio recording of the performance came to nothing. The live radio broadcast was subsequently released on CD, Bernstein's disclaimer included.

Gould was averse to cold and wore heavy clothing (including gloves) even in warm places. He was once arrested, possibly being mistaken for a vagrant, while sitting on a park bench in Sarasota, Florida, dressed in his standard all-climate attire of coat, hat and mittens. He also disliked social functions. He hated being touched, and in later life limited personal contact, relying on the telephone and letters for communication. On a visit to Steinway Hall in New York City in 1959, William Hupfer, the chief piano technician, greeted Gould with a slap on the back. Gould was shocked by this, and complained of aching, lack of coordination, and fatigue because of it. He went on to explore the possibility of litigation against Steinway & Sons if his apparent injuries were permanent. He was known for cancelling performances at the last minute, which is why Bernstein's aforementioned public disclaimer opened with, "Don't be frightened, Mr. Gould is here ... [he] will appear in a moment."

In his liner notes and broadcasts, Gould created more than two dozen alter egos for satirical, humorous, and didactic purposes, permitting him to write hostile reviews or incomprehensible commentaries on his own performances. Probably the best-known are the German musicologist Karlheinz Klopweisser, the English conductor Sir Nigel Twitt-Thornwaite, and the American critic Theodore Slutz. These facets of Gould, whether interpreted as neurosis or "play", have provided ample material for psychobiography.

Gould was a teetotaller and did not smoke. He did not cook; instead he often ate at restaurants and relied on room service. He ate one meal a day, supplemented by arrowroot biscuits and coffee. In his later years he claimed to be vegetarian, though this is not certain. (Note: In a letter to cellist Virginia Katims in 1973, Gould said he had been vegetarian for about ten years (Glenn Gould: Selected Letters, John P. L. Roberts, Ghyslaine Guertin, 1992), but in his private notepads he wrote down some lists of foods he may have eaten, including chicken, Dover sole, roast beef and veal (Bazzana 2003, p. 325). Fran's Restaurant in Toronto was a regular haunt; a CBC profile noted that "sometime between two and three every morning, Gould would go to Fran's, a 24-hour diner a block away from his Toronto apartment, sit in the same booth, and order the same meal of scrambled eggs.)

In 1979 Gould narrated and appeared in a humorous episode of the CBC Television series Cities in which he takes the audience on a sampling tour of Toronto, including a number of places he had never been to before.

=== Personal life ===
External audio
- Gould performing J. S. Bach's Italian Concerto in F major, BWV 971 and various Bach Preludes and Fugues
- Gould performing J. S. Bach's The Art of Fugue, BWV 1080, on organ and piano

Gould lived a private life. The documentarian Bruno Monsaingeon said of him: "No supreme pianist has ever given of his heart and mind so overwhelmingly while showing himself so sparingly." He never married, and biographers have spent considerable time on his sexuality. Bazzana writes, "it is tempting to assume that Gould was asexual, an image that certainly fits his aesthetic and the persona he sought to convey, and one can read the whole Gould literature and be convinced that he died a virgin"—but he also mentions that evidence points to "a number of relationships with women that may or may not have been platonic and ultimately became complicated and were ended".

One piece of evidence arrived in 2007. When Gould was in Los Angeles in 1956, he met Cornelia Foss, an art instructor, and her husband Lukas, a composer and conductor. After several years, she and Gould became lovers. In 1967, she left her husband for Gould, taking her two children with her to Toronto. She purchased a house near Gould's apartment. In 2007, Foss confirmed that she and Gould had had a love affair for several years. According to her, "There were a lot of misconceptions about Glenn, and it was partly because he was so very private. But I assure you, he was an extremely heterosexual man. Our relationship was, among other things, quite sexual." Their affair lasted until 1972, when she returned to her husband. As early as two weeks after leaving her husband, Foss noticed disturbing signs in Gould, alluding to unusual behaviour that was more than "just neurotic". Specifically, he believed that "someone was spying on him", according to Foss's son.

=== Health and death ===
Though an admitted hypochondriac, (Note: Bazzana (2003, pp. 352–368) In a section, quotes Gould: "They say I'm a hypochondriac, and, of course, I am.") Gould had many pains and ailments, but his autopsy revealed few underlying problems in areas that often troubled him. (Note: Ostwald (1997, p. 329) specifies "No physical abnormalities were found in the kidneys, prostate, bones, joints, muscles, or other parts of the body that Glenn so often had complained about.") He worried about everything from high blood pressure (which in his later years he recorded in diary form) to the safety of his hands. (Gould rarely shook people's hands, and habitually wore gloves.) (Note: This is discussed and can be seen in the 1959 National Film Board of Canada documentary film On and Off the Record (Koenig & Kroitor 1959a) and (Koenig & Kroitor 1959b).) (Note: The claim that Gould "never shook hands" is exaggerated. Friedrich (1990, p. 267) quotes Timothy Findley: "Everybody said you never touched his hands, you never try to shake hands with him, but the first thing he did to me was to offer to shake hands. He offered me his hand in a very definite way, none of this tentative, 'don't-touch-me' stuff.") The spine injury he experienced as a child led physicians to prescribe, usually independently, an assortment of analgesics, anxiolytics, and other drugs. Bazzana has speculated that Gould's increasing use of a variety of prescription medications over his career may have had a deleterious effect on his health. It had reached the stage, Bazzana writes, that "he was taking pills to counteract the side effects of other pills, creating a cycle of dependency". In 1956, Gould told photojournalist Jock Carroll about "my hysteria about eating. It's getting worse all the time." In his biography, psychiatrist Peter F. Ostwald noted Gould's increasing neurosis about food in the mid-1950s, something Gould had spoken to him about. Ostwald later discussed the possibility that Gould had developed a "psychogenic eating disorder" around this time. In 1956, Gould was also taking Thorazine, an anti-psychotic medication, and reserpine, another anti-psychotic, which can also be used to lower blood pressure. Cornelia Foss has said that Gould took many antidepressants, which she blamed for his deteriorating mental state.

Whether Gould's behaviour fell within the autism spectrum has been debated. The diagnosis was first suggested by psychiatrist Peter Ostwald, a friend of Gould's, in the 1997 book Glenn Gould: The Ecstasy and Tragedy of Genius. There has also been speculation that he may have had bipolar disorder, because he sometimes went several days without sleep, had extreme increases in energy, drove recklessly, and in later life endured severe depressive episodes.

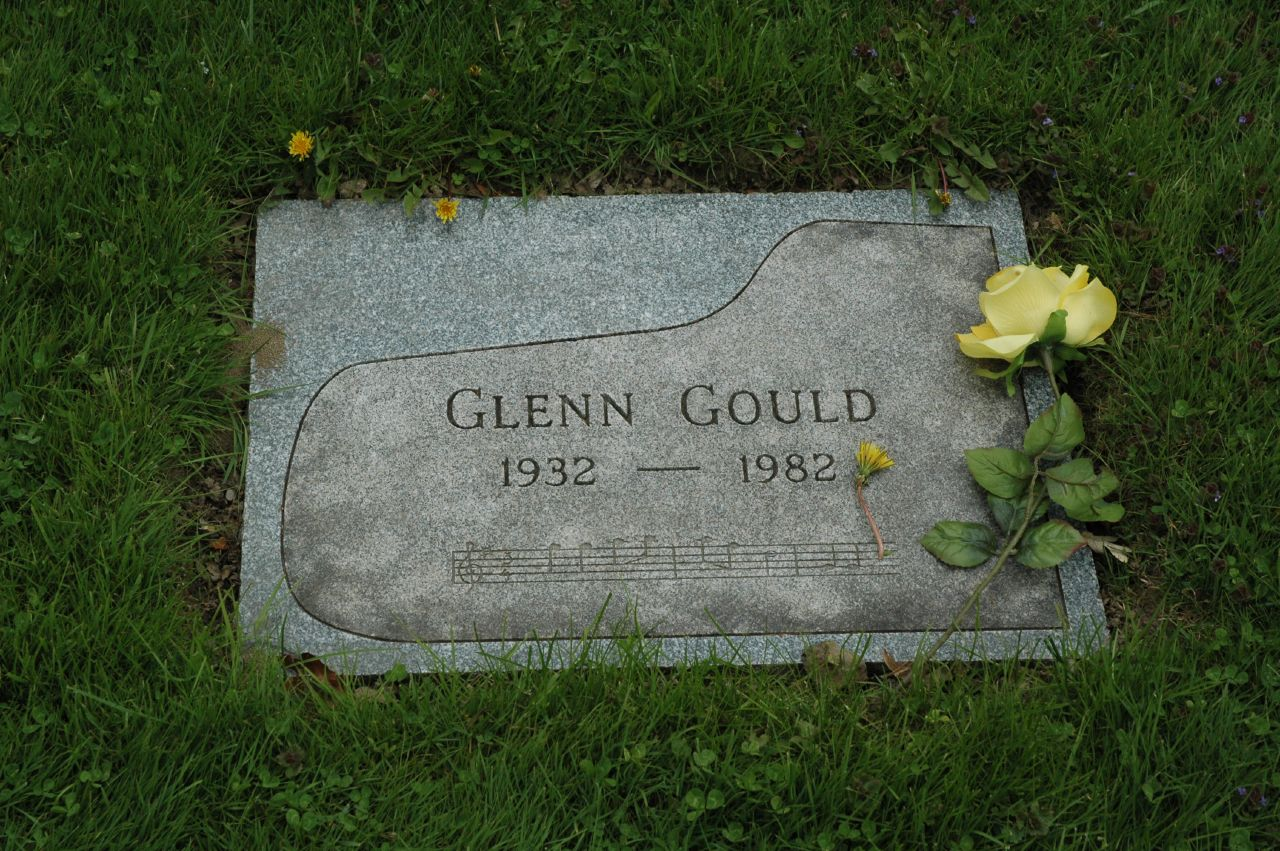
Gould's grave marker, with incipit of Bach's Goldberg Variations

On 27 September 1982, two days after his 50th birthday, after experiencing a severe headache, Gould had a stroke that paralyzed the left side of his body. He was admitted to Toronto General Hospital and his condition rapidly deteriorated. By 4 October, there was evidence of brain damage, and Gould's father decided that his son should be taken off life support. Gould's public funeral was held in St. Paul's Anglican Church on 15 October with singing by Lois Marshall and Maureen Forrester. The service was attended by over 3,000 people and was broadcast on the Canadian Broadcasting Corporation. He is buried next to his parents in Toronto's Mount Pleasant Cemetery (section 38, lot 1050). The first few bars of the Goldberg Variations are carved on his grave marker. An animal lover, Gould left half his estate to the Toronto Humane Society; the other half went to the Salvation Army.

In 2000, a movement disorder neurologist suggested in a paper that Gould had dystonia, "a problem little understood in his time."

== Perspectives ==
=== Writings ===
External audio
- Glenn Gould performs Bach's: Prelude & Fugue No. 1–24, BWV 846–869; Prelude & Fugue No. 1–24, BWV 870–893; English Suite No. 1–6, BWV 806–811; French Suite No. 1–6, BWV 812–817; Goldberg Variations No. 1–30, BWV 988; Partita No. 1–6, BWV 825–830; and various Inventions, Sinfonias & Contrapunctus
- Glenn Gould and the Columbia Symphony Orchestra with Vladimir Golschmann circa 1967 in Bach's Keyboard Concertos: No. 3 in D major, BWV 1054; No. 5 in F minor, BWV 1056; No. 7 in G minor, BWV 1058

Gould periodically told interviewers he would have been a writer if he had not been a pianist. He expounded his criticism and philosophy of music and art in lectures, convocation speeches, periodicals, and CBC radio and television documentaries. Gould participated in many interviews, and had a predilection for scripting them to the extent that they may be seen to be as written work as much as off-the-cuff discussions. Gould's writing style was highly articulate, but sometimes florid, indulgent, and rhetorical. This is especially evident in his (frequent) attempts at humour and irony. (Note: These include his famous "self-interview", his book review of a biography written about him (in which he refers to himself in the third person)—not to mention the various appearances of his "alter egos" in print, radio, or TV, including an "extended and rather strained radio joke show", ("Critics Callout Corner" on the Silver Jubilee Album, 1980) which Kingwell (2009, p. 180) comments: "The humour is punishing... There can be no excuse for it, and the one clear lesson of the recording is that it could exist only because of the stature of its creator. Gould in effect called in twenty-five years of chits from Columbia when he got them to release this embarrassing piece of twaddle.") Bazzana writes that although some of Gould's "conversational dazzle" found its way into his prolific written output, his writing was "at best uneven [and] at worst awful". While offering "brilliant insights" and "provocative theses", Gould's writing is often marred by "long, tortuous sentences" and a "false formality", Bazzana writes.

In his writing, Gould praised certain composers and rejected what he deemed banal in music composition and its consumption by the public, and also gave analyses of the music of Richard Strauss, Alban Berg and Anton Webern. Despite a certain affection for Dixieland jazz, Gould was mostly averse to popular music. He enjoyed a jazz concert with his friends as a youth, mentioned jazz in his writings, and once criticized the Beatles for "bad voice leading" (Note: These comments can be found in essays in Gould (1987).)—while praising Petula Clark and Barbra Streisand. Gould and jazz pianist Bill Evans were mutual admirers, and Evans made his record Conversations with Myself using Gould's Steinway model CD 318 piano.

=== On art ===
Gould's perspective on art is often summed up by this 1962 quotation: "The justification of art is the internal combustion it ignites in the hearts of men and not its shallow, externalized, public manifestations. The purpose of art is not the release of a momentary ejection of adrenaline but is, rather, the gradual, lifelong construction of a state of wonder and serenity."

Gould repeatedly called himself "the last puritan", a reference to the philosopher George Santayana's 1935 novel of the same name. But he was progressive in many ways, promulgating the atonal composers of the early 20th century, and anticipating, through his deep involvement in the recording process, the vast changes technology had on the production and distribution of music. Mark Kingwell summarizes the paradox, never resolved by Gould nor his biographers, this way:

He was progressive and anti-progressive at once, and likewise at once both a critic of the Zeitgeist and its most interesting expression. He was, in effect, stranded on a beachhead of his own thinking between past and future. That he was not able, by himself, to fashion a bridge between them is neither surprising, nor, in the end, disappointing. We should see this failure, rather, as an aspect of his genius. He both was and was not a man of his time.

=== Technology ===
The issue of "authenticity" in relation to an approach like Gould's has been greatly debated (although less so by the end of the 20th century): is a recording less authentic or "direct" for having been highly refined by technical means in the studio? Gould likened his process to that of a film director—one knows that a two-hour film was not made in two hours—and implicitly asked why the recording of music should be different. He went so far as to conduct an experiment with musicians, sound engineers, and laypeople in which they were to listen to a recording and determine where the splices occurred. Each group chose different points, but none was wholly successful. While the test was hardly scientific, Gould remarked, "The tape does lie, and nearly always gets away with it".

In the lecture and essay "Forgery and Imitation in the Creative Process", one of his most significant texts, Gould makes explicit his views on authenticity and creativity. He asks why the epoch in which a work is received influences its reception as "art", postulating a sonata of his own composition that sounds so like one of Haydn's that it is received as such. If, instead, the sonata had been attributed to an earlier or later composer, it becomes more or less interesting as a piece of music. Yet it is not the work that has changed but its relation within the accepted narrative of music history. Similarly, Gould notes the "pathetic duplicity" in the reception of high-quality forgeries by Han van Meegeren of new paintings attributed to the Dutch master Johannes Vermeer, before and after the forgery was known.

Gould preferred an ahistorical, or at least pre-Renaissance, view of art, minimizing the identity of the artist and the attendant historical context in evaluating the artwork: "What gives us the right to assume that in the work of art we must receive a direct communication with the historical attitudes of another period? ... moreover, what makes us assume that the situation of the man who wrote it accurately or faithfully reflects the situation of his time? ... What if the composer, as historian, is faulty?"

== Recordings ==
External audio
- Gould performing Beethoven's Piano Concerto No. 4, with Leonard Bernstein and the New York Philharmonic in 1961
- Gould performing Beethoven's Piano Concerto No. 2
- Gould performing music by Orlando Gibbons and William Byrd in 1993

=== Studio ===
In creating music, Gould much preferred the control and intimacy provided by the recording studio. He disliked the concert hall, which he compared to a competitive sporting arena. He gave his final public performance in 1964, and thereafter devoted his career to the studio, recording albums and several radio documentaries. He was attracted to the technical aspects of recording, and considered the manipulation of tape to be another part of the creative process. Although Gould's recording studio producers have testified that "he needed splicing less than most performers", Gould used the process to give himself total artistic control over the recording process. He recounted his recording of the A minor fugue from Book I of The Well-Tempered Clavier and how it was spliced together from two takes, with the fugue's expositions from one take and its episodes from another.

Gould's first commercial recording (of Berg's Piano sonata, Op. 1) came in 1953 on the short-lived Canadian Hallmark label. He soon signed with Columbia Records' classical music division and, in 1955, recorded Bach: The Goldberg Variations, his breakthrough work. Although there was some controversy at Columbia about the appropriateness of this "debut" piece, the record received extraordinary praise and was among the best-selling classical music albums of its era. Gould became closely associated with the piece, playing it in full or in part at many recitals. A new recording of the Goldberg Variations, in 1981, was among his last albums; the piece was one of a few he recorded twice in the studio. The 1981 release was one of CBS Masterworks' first digital recordings. The 1955 interpretation is highly energetic and often frenetic; the later is slower and more deliberate—Gould wanted to treat the aria and its 30 variations as a cohesive whole. (Note: There are two other Gould recordings of the Goldberg Variations. One is a live recording from 1954 CBC Records (PSCD 2007); the other is live recorded in Moscow on 7 May 1957, and in Salzburg on 25 August 1959 (Sony SRCR 9500). It is part of The Glenn Gould edition and has been re-released on CD on Sony Classical Records (SMK 52685).)

Gould said Bach was "first and last an architect, a constructor of sound, and what makes him so inestimably valuable to us is that he was beyond a doubt the greatest architect of sound who ever lived". He recorded most of Bach's other keyboard works, including both books of The Well-Tempered Clavier and the partitas, French Suites, English Suites, inventions and sinfonias, keyboard concertos, and a number of toccatas (which interested him least, being less polyphonic). For his only recording at the organ, he recorded some of The Art of Fugue, which was also released posthumously on piano.

As for Beethoven, Gould preferred the composer's early and late periods. He recorded all five of the piano concertos, collaborating with Vladimir Golschmann and the Columbia Symphony Orchestra (members of the New York Philharmonic) on No. 1, with Leonard Bernstein and the Columbia Symphony Orchestra (members of the New York Philharmonic) on Nos. 2 and 3, with Bernstein and the New York Philharmonic Orchestra on No. 4, and with Leopold Stokowski and the American Symphony Orchestra on No. 5. He also recorded 22 of the piano sonatas, and numerous bagatelles and variations. Gould was the first pianist to record any of Liszt's piano transcriptions of Beethoven's symphonies (beginning with the Fifth Symphony, in 1967, with the Sixth released in 1969).

Gould also recorded works by Brahms, Mozart, and many other prominent piano composers, though he was outspoken in his criticism of the Romantic era as a whole. He was extremely critical of Chopin. When asked whether he found himself wanting to play Chopin, he replied: "No, I don't. I play it in a weak moment—maybe once a year or twice a year for myself. But it doesn't convince me." But in 1970, he played Chopin's B minor sonata for the CBC and said he liked some of the miniatures and "sort of liked the first movement of the B minor".

Although he recorded all of Mozart's sonatas and admitted enjoying the "actual playing" of them, Gould said he disliked Mozart's later works. He was fond of a number of lesser-known composers such as Orlando Gibbons, whose Anthems he had heard as a teenager, and whose music he felt a "spiritual attachment" to. He recorded a number of Gibbons's keyboard works, and called him his favourite composer, despite his better-known admiration for Bach. (Note: Gould discusses this in Bruno Monsaingeon's 1974 film series Chemins de la Musique (Ways of the Music). His 24 part series features Gould in four of those parts: La Retraite (The Retreat), L'Alchimiste (The Alchemist), 1974, Partita No. 6 (Bach's Partita No 6). Archived 11 June 2013 at the Wayback Machine The four parts on Gould were re-released in 2002 on DVD as Gould: the alchemist (Monsaingeon 2002).) He made recordings of piano music by Jean Sibelius (the Sonatines and Kyllikki), Georges Bizet (the Variations Chromatiques de Concert and the Premier nocturne), Richard Strauss (the Piano Sonata, the Five Pieces, and Enoch Arden with Claude Rains), and Hindemith (the three piano sonatas and the sonatas for brass and piano). He also made recordings of Schoenberg's complete piano works. In early September 1982, Gould made his final recording: Strauss's Piano Sonata in B minor.

=== Collaborations ===
External videos
- Glenn Gould performing on YouTube Bach's Brandenburg Concerto No. 5 on a "harpsipiano" with Julius Baker and Oscar Shumsky for CBC Television in 1962
- Glenn Gould performing Beethoven's Piano Sonata No. 17, Op. 31, No. 2 ("Tempest") in 1960
- Glenn Gould performing Beethoven's Variations and Fugue for Piano in E-flat major, Op. 35 (Eroica Variations) in 1960

The success of Gould's collaborations was to a degree dependent upon his collaborators' receptiveness to his sometimes unconventional readings of the music. The musicologist Michael Stegemann considered Gould's television collaboration with American violinist Yehudi Menuhin in 1965, in which they played works by Bach, Beethoven and Schoenberg, a success because "Menuhin was ready to embrace the new perspectives opened up by an unorthodox view". But Stegemann deemed the 1966 collaboration with soprano Elisabeth Schwarzkopf, recording Strauss's Ophelia Lieder, an "outright fiasco". Schwarzkopf believed in "total fidelity" to the score, and objected to the temperature:

The studio was incredibly overheated, which may be good for a pianist but not for a singer: a dry throat is the end as far as singing is concerned. But we persevered nonetheless. It wasn't easy for me. Gould began by improvising something Straussian—we thought he was simply warming up, but no, he continued to play like that throughout the actual recordings, as though Strauss's notes were just a pretext that allowed him to improvise freely.

Gould recorded Schoenberg, Hindemith, and Ernst Krenek with numerous vocalists, including Donald Gramm and Ellen Faull. He also recorded Bach's six sonatas for violin and harpsichord (BWV 1014–1019) with Jaime Laredo, and the three sonatas for viola da gamba and keyboard with Leonard Rose. Claude Rains narrated their recording of Strauss's melodrama Enoch Arden. Gould also collaborated with members of the New York Philharmonic, the flutist Julius Baker and the violinist Rafael Druian, in a recording of Bach's Brandenburg Concerto No. 4, and with Leopold Stokowski and the American Symphony Orchestra in a performance of Beethoven's Piano Concerto No. 5 in 1966.

Gould collaborated extensively with Vladimir Golschmann and the Columbia Symphony Orchestra for the Columbia Masterworks label in his recording of Beethoven's Piano Concerto No. 1 in 1958 and several works by Bach in the 1960s, including the Keyboard Concerto No. 3 (BWV 1054), the Keyboard Concerto No. 5 (BWV 1056) and the Keyboard Concerto No. 7 (BWV 1058) in 1967 and the Keyboard Concerto No. 2 in E major (BWV 1053) and the Keyboard Concerto No. 4 in A major (BWV 1055) in 1969.

=== Documentaries ===
Gould made numerous television and radio programs for CBC Television and CBC Radio. Notable productions include his musique concrète Solitude Trilogy, consisting of The Idea of North, a meditation on Northern Canada and its people; The Latecomers, about Newfoundland; and The Quiet in the Land, about Mennonites in Manitoba. All three use a radiophonic electronic-music technique that Gould called "contrapuntal radio", in which several people are heard speaking at once—much like the voices in a fugue—manipulated through overdubbing and editing. His experience of driving across northern Ontario while listening to Top 40 radio in 1967 inspired one of his most unusual radio pieces, The Search for Petula Clark, a dissertation on Clark's recordings.

Also among Gould's CBC programs was an educational lecture on the music of Bach, "Glenn Gould On Bach", which featured a collaborative performance with Julius Baker and Oscar Shumsky of Brandenburg Concerto No. 5. His other radio documentaries include Casals: A Portrait for Radio, Stokowski: A Portrait for Radio and Schoenberg: The Man Who Changed Music. None of the recordings of Gould's electronic compositions were acquired by Sony when it bought the rights of his recordings of Western classical music.

== Transcriptions, compositions, and conducting ==
External audio
- Glenn Gould collaborating with Vladimir Golschmann and the Columbia Symphony Orchestra in Beethoven's Piano Concerto No. 1 in C major, Op. 15 in 1958
- Glenn Gould and Vladimir Golschmann with the Columbia Symphony Orchestra in J. S. Bach's: Keyboard Concerto No. 2 in E major, BWV 1053 and Keyboard Concerto No. 4 in A major, BWV 1055 in 1969
- Glenn Gould's String Quartet in F minor, Op. 1, performed by the Symphonia Quartet in 1960

Gould was also a prolific transcriber of orchestral repertoire for piano. He transcribed his own Wagner and Ravel recordings, as well as Strauss's operas and Schubert's and Bruckner's symphonies, which he played privately for pleasure. (Note: The Schubert can be seen briefly in the film Hereafter (Monsaingeon 2006). The transcription of Bruckner's 8th symphony Gould alludes to in an article (Gould 1987) where he deprecates its "sheer ledger-line unplayability"; the Strauss opera playing can be seen in one of the Humphrey Burton conversations and is referred to by almost everyone who saw him play in private.)

Gould dabbled in composition, with few finished works. As a teenager, he wrote chamber music and piano works in the style of the Second Viennese School. Significant works include a string quartet, which he finished in his 20s (published 1956, recorded 1960), and his cadenzas to Beethoven's Piano Concerto No. 1. Later works include the Lieberson Madrigal (soprano, alto, tenor, bass [SATB] and piano), and "So You Want to Write a Fugue?" (SATB with piano or string-quartet accompaniment). His String Quartet (Op. 1) received a mixed reaction: The Christian Science Monitor and Saturday Review were quite laudatory, the Montreal Star less so. There is little critical commentary on Gould's compositions because there are few of them; he never succeeded beyond Opus 1, and left a number of works unfinished. He attributed his failure as a composer to his lack of a "personal voice". Most of his work is published by Schott Music. The recording Glenn Gould: The Composer contains his original works.

Towards the end of his life, Gould began conducting. He had earlier directed Bach's Brandenburg Concerto No. 5 and the cantata Widerstehe doch der Sünde from the harpsipiano (a piano with metal hammers to simulate a harpsichord's sound), and Gustav Mahler's Symphony No. 2 (the Urlicht section) in the 1960s. His first known public appearance conducting occurred in 1939 when he was six, while appearing as a pianist in a concert for the Business Men's Bible Class in Uxbridge. By 1957 he emerged as the conductor for the CBC Television program Chrysler Festival, in which he collaborated with Maureen Forrester. In the same year he also joined forces with the CBC Vancouver Orchestra as a conductor in a radio broadcast of Mozart's Symphony No. 1 and Schubert's Symphony No. 4 ("Tragic").

In 1958, Gould wrote to Golschmann of his "temporary retirement" from conducting, apparently as a result of the unanticipated muscular strain it created. Gould found himself "practically crippled" after his conducting appearances and unable to perform properly at the piano. Yet even at the age of 26, Gould continued to contemplate retiring as a piano soloist and devoting himself entirely to conducting. Immediately before his death, he was finalizing plans to appear as a conductor of Beethoven's Piano Concerto No. 2 in 1982 and in recordings of Mendelssohn's Hebrides Overture and Beethoven's Coriolan Overture in 1983. His last recording as a conductor was of Wagner's Siegfried Idyll in its original chamber-music scoring. He intended to spend his later years conducting, writing about music, and composing while pursuing an idyllic "neoThoreauvian way of life" in the countryside.

== Legacy and honours ==
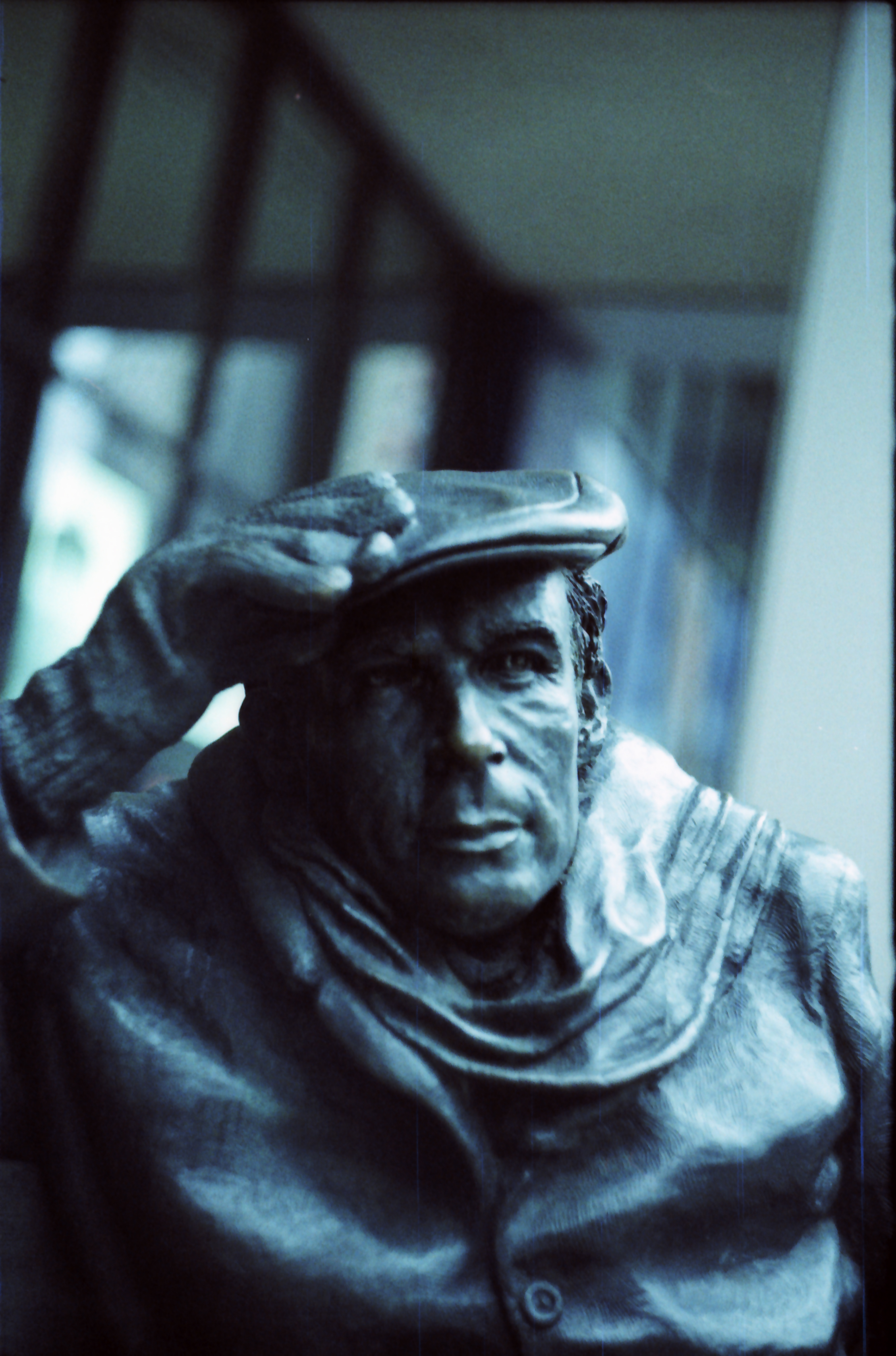
Park bench sculpture of Gould located outside the Canadian Broadcasting Centre

Gould is one of the most acclaimed musicians of the 20th century. His unique pianistic method, insight into the architecture of compositions, and relatively free interpretation of scores created performances and recordings that were revelatory to many listeners and highly objectionable to others. Philosopher Mark Kingwell wrote, "his influence is made inescapable. No performer after him can avoid the example he sets ... Now, everyone must perform through him: he can be emulated or rejected, but he cannot be ignored." Among the pianists who acknowledged Gould's influence are András Schiff, Zoltán Kocsis, Ivo Pogorelić, and Peter Serkin. Artists influenced by Gould include painter George Condo.

One of Gould's performances of the Prelude and Fugue in C major from Book II of The Well-Tempered Clavier was chosen for inclusion on the NASA Voyager Golden Record by a committee headed by Carl Sagan. The record was placed on the spacecraft Voyager 1 and Voyager 2. On 25 August 2012, Voyager 1 became the first to cross the heliopause and enter the interstellar medium.

Gould is a popular subject of biography and critical analysis. Philosophers such as Kingwell and Giorgio Agamben have interpreted his life and ideas. References to Gould and his work are plentiful in poetry, fiction, and the visual arts. François Girard's Genie Award-winning 1993 film Thirty Two Short Films About Glenn Gould includes interviews with people who knew him, dramatizations of scenes from his life, and fanciful segments including an animation set to music. Thomas Bernhard's 1983 novel The Loser purports to be an extended first-person essay about Gould and his lifelong friendship with two fellow students from the Mozarteum school in Salzburg, both of whom have abandoned their careers as concert pianists due to the intimidating example of Gould's genius. The 2009 documentary film Genius Within: The Inner Life of Glenn Gould, by Peter Raymont and Michèle Hozer, also examines Gould's private and creative life, including his relationship with Foss.

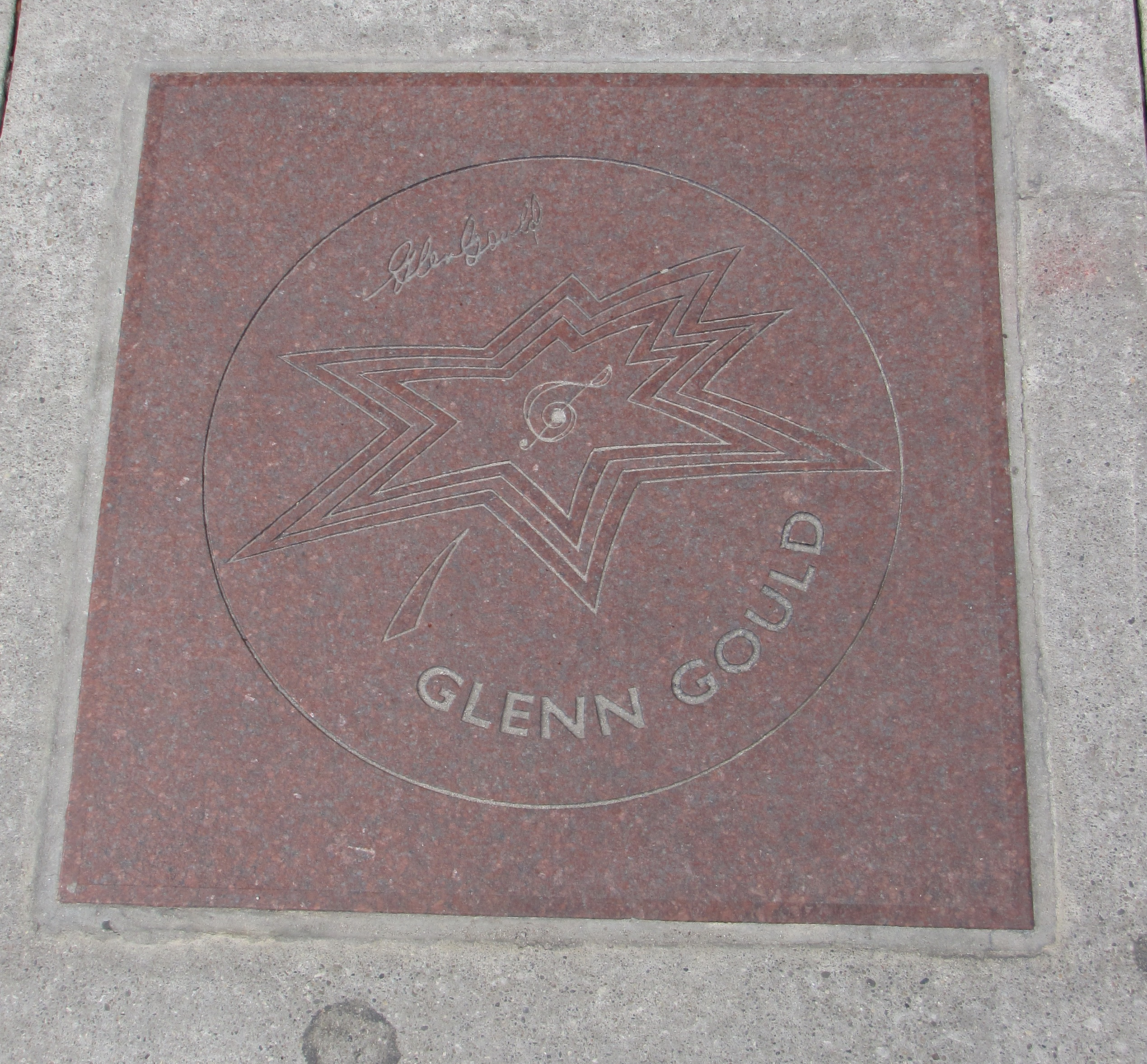
Gould's star on Canada's Walk of Fame

Gould left an extensive body of work beyond the keyboard. After retiring from concertising, he was increasingly interested in other media, including audio and film documentary and writing, through which he mused on aesthetics, composition, music history, and the effect of the electronic age on media consumption. (Gould grew up in Toronto at the same time that Canadian theorists Marshall McLuhan, Northrop Frye, and Harold Innis were making their mark on communications studies.) Anthologies of Gould's writing and letters have been published, and Library and Archives Canada holds a significant portion of his papers.

In 1983, Gould was posthumously inducted into the Canadian Music Hall of Fame. He was inducted into Canada's Walk of Fame in Toronto in 1998, and designated a National Historic Person in 2012. Both his childhood home and his longtime apartment on Saint Clair Avenue West bear Heritage Toronto plaques honouring his life, and a federal plaque was erected next to a sculpture of him in downtown Toronto. The Glenn Gould Studio at the Canadian Broadcasting Centre in Toronto was named after him. To commemorate what would have been Gould's 75th birthday, the Canadian Museum of Civilization held an exhibition, Glenn Gould: The Sounds of Genius, in 2007. The multimedia exhibit was held in conjunction with Library and Archives Canada.

=== Glenn Gould Foundation ===
The Glenn Gould Foundation was established in Toronto in 1983 to honour Gould and keep alive his memory and life's work. The foundation's mission "is to extend awareness of the legacy of Glenn Gould as an extraordinary musician, communicator, and Canadian, and to advance his visionary and innovative ideas into the future", and its prime activity is the triennial awarding of the Glenn Gould Prize to "an individual who has earned international recognition as the result of a highly exceptional contribution to music and its communication, through the use of any communications technologies." The prize consists of CA$100,000 and the responsibility of awarding the CA$15,000 Glenn Gould Protégé Prize to a young musician of the winner's choice.

=== Glenn Gould School ===
The Royal Conservatory of Music Professional School in Toronto adopted the name The Glenn Gould School in 1997 after its most famous alumnus.

== Awards ==
Gould received many honours both during his lifetime and posthumously. He was awarded the 1969 Molson Prize, then worth C$15,000. In 1970, the Canadian government offered him the Companion of the Order of Canada, but he declined, believing himself too young.

=== Juno Awards ===
The Juno Awards are presented annually by the Canadian Academy of Recording Arts and Sciences. Gould won three, accepting one in person.

Year	Award	Nominated work	Result
1979	Best Classical Album of the Year	Hindemith: Das Marienleben (with Roxolana Roslak)	Won
1981	Best Classical Album of the Year	Bach Toccatas, Vol. 2	Nominated
1982	Best Classical Album of the Year	Bach: Preludes. Fughettas & Fugues	Nominated
1983	Best Classical Album of the Year	Haydn: The Six Last Sonatas	Nominated
1983	Best Classical Album of the Year	Bach: The Goldberg Variations	Won
1984	Best Classical Album of the Year	Brahms: Ballades Op. 10, Rhapsodies Op. 79	Won

=== Grammy Awards ===
The Grammys are awarded annually by the National Academy of Recording Arts and Sciences. Gould won four and, as with the Junos, accepted one in person. In 1983 he was inducted posthumously into the Grammy Hall of Fame for his 1955 recording of the Goldberg Variations.

Year	Award	Nominated work	Result
1973	Best Album Notes – Classical	Hindemith: Sonatas for Piano (Complete)	Won
1982	Best Classical Album	Bach: The Goldberg Variations (with producer Samuel H. Carter)	Won
1982	Best Instrumental Soloist Performance (without orchestra)	Bach: The Goldberg Variations	Won
1983	Best Classical Performance – Instrumental Soloist or Soloists (without orchestra)	Beethoven: Piano Sonatas Nos. 12 & 13	Won
2013	Grammy Lifetime Achievement Award		Won

== See also ==
- Gould Estate v Stoddart Publishing Co Ltd
- List of Canadian composers
