= Éditions Durand =

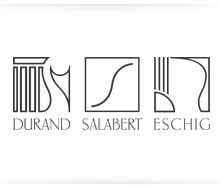
- Parent company: Universal Music Publishing Group
- Founded: 1869; 157 years ago
- Founder: Auguste Durand and Louis Schönewerk
- Country of origin: France
- Publication types: Sheet music
- Official website: www.durand-salabert-eschig.com

Éditions Durand (French pronunciation: [edisjɔ̃ dyʁɑ̃]) are a music publishing company of French origin, among the most important in the field of classical music, which includes three previously independent publishers:

- Éditions Durand — the oldest of the three companies — established in 1869 by Auguste Durand and Louis Schönewerk.
- Éditions Salabert established in 1878 by Édouard Salabert and run from 1901 by his son, Francis Salabert
- Éditions Eschig established in 1907 by Max Eschig.

== History ==
The Éditions Durand, a family business from 1869 to 1982, had as successive directors from its foundation on December 30, 1869, to 2000:

- Auguste Durand (1830–1909) from 1869 to his death in 1909, with the German Louis Schönewerk (1814-18???) as a partner from 1869 to 1891, during which period the company was called Éditions Durand-Schönewerk & Cie, before changing its corporate name on 19 November 1891 to Éditions A. Durand & Fils, when Auguste's son Jacques, became associated with the company
- Jacques Durand (1865–1928) son of the former, from 1909 to his death in 1928, the firm now being called, from 23 December 1909, Éditions Durand & Cie, Jacques Durand being associated with his cousin Gaston Choisnel (1857–1921) then, from April 1921, with another cousin, René Dommange
- René Dommange (1888–1977) cousin of the former, from 1928 to his death in 1977
- Guy Kaufmann (1923–2010), nephew of the former, from 1977 to 1982
- Jean-Manuel Mobillion de Scarano, known as Jean-Manuel de Scarano, from 1982 to 2000.

The historic headquarters of Éditions Durand was located at 4 Place de la Madeleine in the 8th arrondissement of Paris. Since 1980, it has moved several times: first, to 21 rue Vernet in the 8th arrondissement as of June 1, 1980, then 215 Rue du Faubourg-Saint-Honoré in the 8th arrondissement, and then 4-6 Place de la Bourse in the 2nd arrondissement of Paris. In addition, the firm had a warehouse at 1 avenue de la Marne in Asnières-sur-Seine, where the archives of the publishing house were kept.

During its history, Éditions Durand acquired various publishers, including:

- Éditions Flaxland in 1869, founded around 1860 by the Strasbourg native Gustave Flaxland (1847–1895) and whose headquarters were located at 4 Place de la Madeleine in the 8th arrondissement, which became the first headquarters of Éditions Durand; the catalogue was composed of more than 1,400 titles and included lieder by Robert Schumann and Tannhaüser by Richard Wagner
- Éditions Eschig in 1987
- Éditions Amphion in 1987
- Éditions Le Rideau Rouge beginning of the 1990s

In 1987, the company acquired the publishers Max Eschig and Amphion. In the early 1990s, it acquired the classical music catalogue of Rideau Rouge. In 2000, the company was bought by BMG and merged with Salabert to be known as Durand-Salabert-Eschig, and since 2007 the company is a part of Universal Music Publishing Group.

== Publications ==
=== Composers ===
The catalogue of Éditions Durand includes works of the composers Louis Aubert, Alfred Bachelet, Ermend Bonnal, Henri Büsser, André Caplet, Claude Debussy, Claude Delvincourt, Paul Dukas, Maurice Duruflé, Gabriel Fauré, Pierre-Octave Ferroud, Jacques Ibert, Vincent d'Indy, André Jolivet, Victorin de Joncières, Édouard Lalo, Jules Massenet, Olivier Messiaen, Darius Milhaud, Francis Poulenc, Maurice Ravel, Jean Roger-Ducasse, Joseph-Guy Ropartz, Albert Roussel, Camille Saint-Saëns, Gustave Samazeuilh, Florent Schmitt, Pierre Vellones, Charles-Marie Widor.

Since the 1980s, Gilbert Amy, Nicolas Bacri, Claude Ballif, Édith Canat de Chizy, Renaud Gagneux, Philippe Hersant, François-Bernard Mâche, Philippe Manoury, Yan Maresz, Laurent Petitgirard have been among the composers included in the catalogue.

In addition to the publication of contemporary composers, Éditions Durand undertook an edition of the complete works of Jean-Philippe Rameau under the initial direction of Camille Saint-Saëns (edition interrupted in 1918).

In 1914, Éditions Durand launched the important collection "Édition classique Durand & Fils", with editions of 19th century works by famous composers: piano sonatas and sonatas for violin and piano by Beethoven revised by Paul Dukas, piano works by Frederic Chopin revised by Claude Debussy, violin sonatas by Haydn revised by Florent Schmitt, piano works by Felix Mendelssohn revised by Maurice Ravel, chamber music by Felix Mendelssohn revised by Albert Roussel, piano works by Robert Schumann revised by Gabriel Fauré.

=== Other publications ===
In addition to music publishing, the firm published a collection of theoretical works, written by Jacques Durand and others: (Éléments d’harmonie), Ernest Guiraud (Traité pratique d'instrumentation), Vincent d'Indy (Cours de composition musicale) written in collaboration with Auguste Sérieyx, and Léon Roques' (Principes théoriques et pratiques de la transposition).

Éditions Durand also published, under the title "Littérature musicale", a collection of monographs on composers (Louis Aubert by Louis Vuillemin, Claude Debussy by Daniel Chennevière, Paul Dukas by Gustave Samazeuilh, Gabriel Fauré by Louis Vuillemin, Vincent d'Indy by Louis Borgex, Maurice Ravel by Roland-Manuel, Roger-Ducasse by Laurent Ceillier, Albert Roussel by Louis Vuillemin, Camille Saint-Saëns by Jean Bonnerot, etc.) or about particular compositions (for example Ascanio, Fervaal and Tannhäuser), and also the memoirs of publisher Jacques Durand.

== Concerts ==
In addition, under the direction of Jacques Durand, Éditions Durand organized on several occasions chamber music concerts, and sometimes even orchestral music concerts, to promote the authors in its catalogue : in 1910, 1911, 1912 and 1913. and, later, 1927.

== Bibliography (chronological order) ==
- Jacques Durand, Quelques souvenirs d’un éditeur de musique, Paris, Durand, 1924, 136 p.
- Jacques Durand, Quelques souvenirs d’un éditeur de musique. 2nd series (1910-1924), Paris, Durand, 1926, 162 p.
- Jacques Durand, Lettres de Claude Debussy à son éditeur, Paris, Durand, 1927, 191 p.
- Robert Bernard, Jacques Durand (1865-1928), Genève, Édition de la Revue mensuelle, 1929, 100 p.
- René Dommange and Lola Dommange, 1869-1969 : Livre du centenaire des Éditions Durand & Cie, Paris, Durand, 1969. 83 p.
- Anik Devriès-Lesure and François Lesure, Dictionnaire des éditeurs de musique français, volume II: De 1820 à 1914, Geneva, Minkoff, 1988.
- Jacques Depaulis, Lettres de Roger-Ducasse à son éditeur Jacques Durand, Revue de la Société liégeoise de Musicologie, 8, 1997, p. 5-126.
- Alain Surrans, L'édition musicale en France, Paris, Association française d'action artistique (AFAA), 1998.
- Robert S. Nichols, Nigel Simeone and Jeremy Drake, "Durand", The New Grove Dictionary of Music and Musicians, London, Macmillan, 2001, vol. 7, p. 736-737.
- Robert S. Nichols and Jeremy Drake, "Salabert", The New Grove Dictionary of Music and Musicians, London, Macmillan, 2001.
- Robert S. Nichols and Jeremy Drake, "Eschig, Max[imilian]", The New Grove Dictionary of Music and Musicians, London, Macmillan, 2001.
- Christian Voisin and François Doury, Le manoir de Bel-Ebat et la musique française autour de Claude Debussy, foreword by Michel Denis, Héricy, Editions du Puits Fleuri, 2002, 228 p.
- Marc Vignal (under the direction of), Dictionnaire de la musique, Paris, Larousse, 2005 (new edition). (notices on Éditions Durand, p. 322; Éditions Eschig, p. 350; Éditions Salabert, p. 876)
