= Jacques Charlot =

French composer (1885–1915)

Jacques Louis Albert Charlot (English: /ʃɑːrˈloʊ/ shar-LOH, French: [ʒak ʃaʁlo]; 13 September 1885 – 3 March 1915) was a French composer. He was killed in action, mort pour la France during World War I.

Charlot was born on 13 September 1885 in the 17th arrondissement of Paris.

A nephew of the music publisher Jacques Durand, he published with the firm Éditions Durand numerous compositions for piano as well as many transcriptions of the works of others, most notably Claude Debussy and Maurice Ravel. He wrote reductions for single piano two hands of Ravel's Ma mère l'Oye; of the 3rd movement, Habanera, of his Rapsodie espagnole; and of the 1st piece of his Sites auriculaires for two pianos. He reduced for piano Debussy's Première rhapsodie and the Petite pièce. Of Debussy's other work, he transcribed for piano four hands "Golliwogg's Cake Walk" from Children's Corner, Hommage à Haydn and four Préludes.

Prelude of Le Tombeau de Couperin

Mobilized during World War I, he served as a lieutenant in the 170th infantry regiment and was killed at the front at the Col de la Chapelotte on 3 March 1915. Ravel dedicated the prelude of his suite Le Tombeau de Couperin to him, Debussy the 2nd movement of his En blanc et noir.

== Bibliography ==
- Marnat, Marcel (1986). Maurice Ravel (in French). Paris: Fayard. ISBN 2-213-01685-2..
- Lesure, François (2003). Claude Debussy (in French). Paris: Fayard. ISBN 2-213-61619-1..
