= Jacques Durand (publisher) =

French music publisher and composer

- Born: Marie-Jacques Massacrié-Durand; 22 February 1865; Paris, France
- Died: 22 August 1928 (aged 63)
- Other name: J. Samm
- Education: Conservatoire de Paris
- Occupations: Music publisher; Composer
- Organizations: Éditions Durand

Marie-Jacques Massacrié-Durand (22 February 1865 – 22 August 1928) was a French music publisher and composer, sometimes under the pseudonym J. Samm. The family's publishing house, Éditions Durand, published works by many of Durand's contemporaries, including Claude Debussy, Paul Dukas, Gabriel Fauré, Jacques Ibert, Darius Milhaud, Maurice Ravel and Camille Saint-Saëns.

== Life ==
Born in Paris, Durand was a fellow student of Paul Dukas and Claude Debussy at the Conservatoire de Paris, where his only reward was an honourable mention (2^{e} accessit) in harmony in 1884.

Jacques Durand was first associated with his father Auguste Durand in 1886 as director of the music publishing house Durand-Schönewerk & Cie at 4, Place de la Madeleine in Paris. On 19 November 1891, the company changed its name to Éditions A. Durand & Fils. In 1909, after his father's death, he took over the management of the publishing house. On 23 November of that year, the company changed its name again to Éditions Durand & Cie. From then on, Durand was associated with his cousin Gaston Choisnel (1857–1921) and then, from April 1921, with another cousin, René Dommange.

Among the main composers published under the direction of Jacques Durand were many of his contemporaries such as Louis Aubert, André Caplet, Debussy, Dukas, Gabriel Fauré, Jacques Ibert, Vincent d'Indy, Darius Milhaud, Maurice Ravel, Albert Roussel, Camille Saint-Saëns, and Florent Schmitt.

In 1914, under his direction, Éditions Durand launched the important collection Édition classique Durand & Fils, with the French editions of 19th century works by renowned composers: piano sonatas and sonatas for violin and piano of Beethoven by Dukas, piano works of Frédéric Chopin by Debussy, violin sonatas of Haydn by Schmitt, piano works of Felix Mendelssohn by Ravel, chamber music of Mendelssohn by Roussel, and piano works of Robert Schumann by Fauré.

Durand led an initiative to organise chamber music concerts, and sometimes even orchestral music concerts, to promote the authors of his publishing house's catalogue: in 1910, 1911, 1912 and 1913 and later in 1927 : the first of the "Concerts Durand" took place on March 15, 1910. One of the critics was disappointed because she had been led to believe she would hear music by new composers, and got Camille Saint-Saëns, Vincent d'Indy, Jean Roger-Ducasse instead, with one work by young Louis Aubert. The orchestra was conducted by Rhené-Baton. The first "Séance de Musique moderne" in 1911 was reviewed by Jacques Ibert, the players included Ricardo Viñes (Gaspard de la Nuit), Alfred Cortot and Jacques Thibaud (Sonate for piano and violin by Gustave Samazeuilh), as well as a Trio by Edouard Lalo and a quartet by Saint-Saëns played by the Hayot String Quartet (active in France in 1895-1905). This quartet included Maurice Hayot (first violin, 1862-1945, a teacher at the École normale de musique de Paris), Lucien André (who replaced Firmin Touche, second violin, Jean-Claude Touche's father), Joseph Salmon (cello) and Frédéric Denayer (1878-1946, viola, one of Théophile Laforge's pupils who got First prize in 1897, and also played in Armand Parent's Quatuor Parent and became alto solo of the Amsterdam Concertgebouw Orchestra. The Hayot quartet was photographed.

In 1924, Durand made a major donation of Claude Debussy's musical manuscripts to the library of the Conservatoire de Paris. Durand was also a patron of musicians; in 1927, he made a donation of 100,000 francs to the Académie des beaux-arts to establish a biennial musical composition prize for a symphonic or chamber music work. His untimely death in 1928 prevented him from seeing the realisation of this gift.

Durand was the owner of the manor house of Bel Ébat in Avon, the former hunting lodge of King Henry IV of France, not far from Fontainebleau.

In 1889, he married Augustine Marcotte, daughter of his adoptive mother. They had no children.

On 22 August 1928, Durand died of a stroke at the age of 63. Notified by his widow, Ravel, then in the middle of the orchestration of the Boléro, came from Montfort l'Amaury the next day to Avon, and returned for the funeral celebrated in private: "Yes, I went to Avon on Thursday [23 August 1928]. The other week, a telegram from Ms. Durand told me that poor Jacques had a stroke and died within a few hours. I went back there on Saturday [25 August 1928]." "For the funeral, very simple, no church. Few people: only relatives and friends. So much more moving than the great ceremony in Paris that one might have feared." The press confirmed Maurice Ravel's testimony: "The funeral of Mr. Jacques Durand, the well-known music publisher, was celebrated in the strictest privacy on the 26th of this year in Avon (Seine-et-Marne). No announcement has been sent."

== Publications ==
- Éléments d'harmonie à l'usage de débutants, suivis d'exemples explicatifs tirés d'œuvres anciennes et modernes (in French). Paris: Durand. 1919. p. 39.
- Cours professionnel à l'usage des employés du commerce de musique. I : Édition musicale historique et technique. II : Abrégé de l'histoire de la musique (in French). Paris: Durand. 1923. p. 32.
- Quelques souvenirs d'un éditeur de musique (in French). Paris: Durand. 1924. p. 136. (First volume of memories from the director of the Éditions Durand from 1909 to 1928)
- Quelques souvenirs d'un éditeur de musique, 2^{e} série (1910–1924) (in French). Paris: Durand. 1926. p. 191. (Second volume of the memories of the director of Éditions Durand from 1909 to 1928)
- Lettres de Claude Debussy à son éditeur (in French). Paris: Durand. 1927. p. 191.

== Awards and honours ==
- 1900: Chevalier de la Légion d'honneur.
- 1913: Officier de la Légion d'honneur.
- 1924: Silver medal from the Ministry of Labour (for services rendered to the mutual insurance institution).

== Laureates of the Jacques Durand Prize of the Académie des Beaux-Arts ==
- 1930: Maurice Le Boucher and Robert Dussaut.
- 1932: Louis Aubert and Gustave Samazeuilh.
- 1934: Guy Ropartz and Joseph-Ermend Bonnal.
- 1936: Dominique-Charles Planchet.
- 1938: Claude Delvincourt.
- 1940: Pierre Kunc.
- 1942: Gabriel Grovlez.
- 1946: Paul Le Flem.
- 1948: Simone Plé-Caussade.
