= Piano Quintet No. 2 (Fauré) =

Piano quintet by Gabriel Fauré

Fauré in 1922, the year after the premiere of the quintet

Gabriel Fauré's Piano Quintet No. 2 in C minor, Op. 115, is the second of his two works in the genre and his last four-movement chamber work. Dedicated to Paul Dukas, the quintet was given its premiere in Paris at a concert of the Société nationale de musique on 21 May 1921. It was an immediate success and has always been more popular than the First Quintet, completed sixteen years earlier.

== Background ==
Fauré began working on his Second Piano Quintet in 1919 at Annecy-le-Vieux in Savoy, during his summer holiday from his duties as Director of the Paris Conservatoire. He was 74, increasingly deaf, and nearing the end of his time as director. From Annecy he wrote to his wife, who remained in Paris, "as yet there are only sketches, so for the moment I'm not speaking of it to anyone". Fauré was a slow, painstaking composer and the quintet took months of work, although by comparison with the first quintet – on which he worked intermittently for 18 years – it was completed relatively quickly. The middle movements were finished first, during a long summer holiday at Annecy in 1920. His reluctant retirement from the Conservatoire at the end of September 1920 left him more time for composition, which he found a great benefit in completing the quintet. The finished manuscript is dated March 1921, although the Fauré scholar Robert Orledge suggests that it was probably completed in Nice the previous month.

The work was premiered at a concert of the Société nationale de musique in the concert hall of the Conservatoire on 21 May 1921 by what Orledge calls "a distinguished group of devoted Faureans". The players were Robert Lortat (piano), André Tourret and Victor Gentil (violins), Maurice Vieux (viola) and Gérard Hekking (cello).

== Structure ==
The work is scored for piano and standard string quartet. The playing time is generally between 30 and 35 minutes.

There are four movements:

1. Allegro moderato
2. Allegro vivo
3. Andante moderato
4. Allegro molto

=== I. Allegro moderato ===
As in the first quintet, the opening is characterised by piano arpeggios, but now in the bass register: as the Fauré scholar Roger Nichols puts it, "no longer ethereal, but earthy and urgent". Over the arpeggios the strings enter one by one, as in the first quintet, led here by the viola with the principal theme of the first movement. The first violin then introduces a more rhythmically marked figure. The two themes are interwoven, with shifts of key. The development section is not severely polyphonic like its predecessor in the first quintet, but calm and flowing. The opening theme makes an emphatic reappearance in its original key, and is further developed, with a passage in octaves for the first violin. After a last appearance of the second theme the movement ends with a coda in C major.

=== II. Allegro vivo ===
The Allegro vivo second movement is a scherzo, the first of the four movements to be written. It opens with rapid scale figuration in the piano, later joined by the strings. A more lyrical theme in an arching shape follows for the strings, and the movement concludes with the two themes combined. Nichols comments that this movement is one of Faure's "most astonishing inventions, pushing tonality as far as he would ever take it and (as any pianist will testify) subverting habitual finger patterns".

=== III. Andante moderato ===
The analyst Michael Struck-Schloen describes the slow movement as "a grand two-part song with a coda [which] builds a bridge between Beethoven's late string quartets and Wagner's Tristan in its string introduction". After the expressive first theme, the piano enters and introduces a second theme, with the strings accompanied by off-beat piano chords. The strings return to the first theme in the development section and the second theme returns. The movement concludes in its original G major, after what Nichols calls "playful … intimations of a final cadence some twenty-five bars before it finally arrives".

=== IV. Allegro molto ===
As in the first movement, the viola introduces the first theme, an arching melody against syncopated octaves on the piano that has something in common with the opening theme of the first movement. A second theme is given to piano and viola, and after the return of the first theme, a third emerges. The three elements interplay, rondo-style, and then combine before a C major coda.

== Critical reception ==
The work was a success from its premiere onwards. The music critic of Le Figaro wrote of "l'énorme succès" and the loud cheers of the audience:

This new work, of an enchanting freshness of ideas, produced an unparalleled effect. ... The andante is of a sculptural beauty and the scherzo of incomparable and constant youthfulness. Of all the chamber music of our brilliant colleague and friend, this 2nd Quintet will certainly remain as one of the most sublime.

The critic Émile Vuillermoz described the quintet as "a work of incomparable nobility". and said that the score profoundly honoured French art and gave young artists hope for the future. Another leading critic, Louis Vuillemin, called it a masterpiece and wrote of "A deep and magnificent serenity of a great poet, wise and lyrical. ... There is not in this second quintet the slightest trace of externality, the slightest sound effect, the slightest concession, even unconscious, to fashions and ways. There is nothing but pure music, stripped of artifice". In 1924 Aaron Copland wrote:

I suppose, if one were forced to name Faure's chef d'œuvre, those who know his work best would agree on the second Piano Quintet (1921). (Note: Copland wrote this before Fauré's final work, the String Quartet, was premiered and published.) In it is embodied a pure well of spirituality, a humanizing force such as is found in only the greatest masters. … The entire composition is extremely classic, that is to say, it is as far removed as possible from the romantic temperament. In profundity it recalls Bach, in grace, Mozart.

In 1922 Durand et fils published the score and also a reduction for piano duet. The published score is dedicated to Fauré's friend and Parisian near neighbour, the composer Paul Dukas.

== Recordings ==
The following recordings, listed in WorldCat (February 2021), are shown in order of length of total playing time.

| | 1st mvt | 2nd mvt | 3rd mvt | 4th mvt | Total | Ref |
|---|---|---|---|---|---|---|
| Gaby Casadesus and the Guilet Quartet | 11:06 | 3:55 | 9:09 | 5:50 | 30:00 | |
| Jean Hubeau and the Via Nova Quartet | 10:38 | 3:54 | 10:55 | 5:56 | 31:23 | |
| Domus and Anthony Marwood | 10:03 | 4:04 | 10:57 | 6:06 | 31:30 | |
| Peter Orth and the Auryn Quartet | 10:52 | 3:58 | 11:05 | 5:50 | 31:45 | |
| Schubert Ensemble of London | 10:04 | 4:11 | 11:13 | 6:07 | 31:57 | |
| Cristina Ortiz and the Fine Arts Quartet | 10:59 | 4:30 | 10:16 | 6:24 | 32:17 | |
| Pascal Rogé and the Ysaÿe Quartet | 11:10 | 4:05 | 11:36 | 6:03 | 32:54 | |
| Quintetto Fauré di Roma | 11:10 | 4:24 | 11:25 | 6:12 | 33:11 | |
| Jean-Philippe Collard and the Parrenin Quartet | 11:34 | 4:19 | 11:51 | 6:38 | 34:22 | |
| Éric Le Sage and the Ébène Quartet | 11:29 | 4:03 | 12:38 | 6:10 | 34:20 | |
| Germaine Thyssens-Valentin and the Quatuor de l'ORTF | 11:35 | 3:58 | 12:57 | 6:19 | 34:39 | |

== Notes, references and sources ==
=== Sources ===
- Anderson, Keith (2009). Notes to Naxos CD 8.570938. Hong Kong: Naxos. OCLC 432311393.
- Johnson, Graham (2009). Gabriel Fauré: The Songs and Their Poets. Farnham, Kent, and Burlington, Vt: Ashgate. ISBN 978-0-7546-5960-0.
- Jones, J. Barrie (1989). Gabriel Fauré: A Life in Letters. London: B T Batsford. ISBN 978-0-7134-5468-0.
- Nectoux, Jean-Michel (1991). Gabriel Fauré: A Musical Life. Cambridge: Cambridge University Press. ISBN 978-0-521-23524-2.
- Nichols, Roger (2010). Notes to Chandos CD 10576. Colchester: Chandos Records. OCLC 1135154119.
- Orledge, Robert (1979). Gabriel Fauré. London: Eulenberg. ISBN 978-0-903873-40-6.
- Struck-Schloen, Michael (1997). Notes to CPO CD 999 357-2. Georgsmarienhütte: CPO. OCLC 255775505.
