= O Holy Night =

Christmas song

Cantique de Noël O Holy Night
- by Adolphe Adam
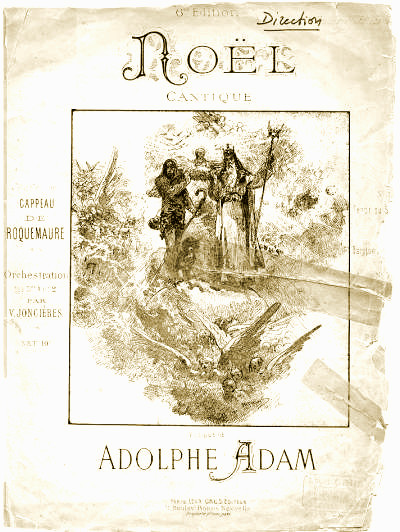
- Front cover of the 6th edition of "Cantique de Noël", 1852
- Native name: Minuit, chrétiens
- Genre: Classical; Christmas
- Text: Placide Cappeau
- Language: French; English
- Composed: 1847

Recording
- Performed by the United States Air Force Heritage of America Band: file; help

"O Holy Night" (original title: Cantique de Noël) is a sacred song associated with the celebration of the birth of Jesus Christ. Its text is based on the 1847 French poem Minuit, chrétiens by Placide Cappeau, which was set to music by composer Adolphe Adam. The widely known English version was written by John Sullivan Dwight, who introduced notable changes to the meaning of the original French lyrics.

The carol has become a standard part of Christmas repertoire and has been recorded by numerous artists.

== Origin and composition ==
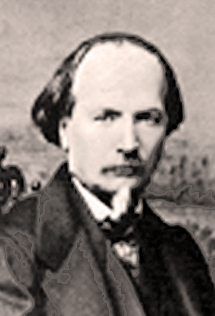
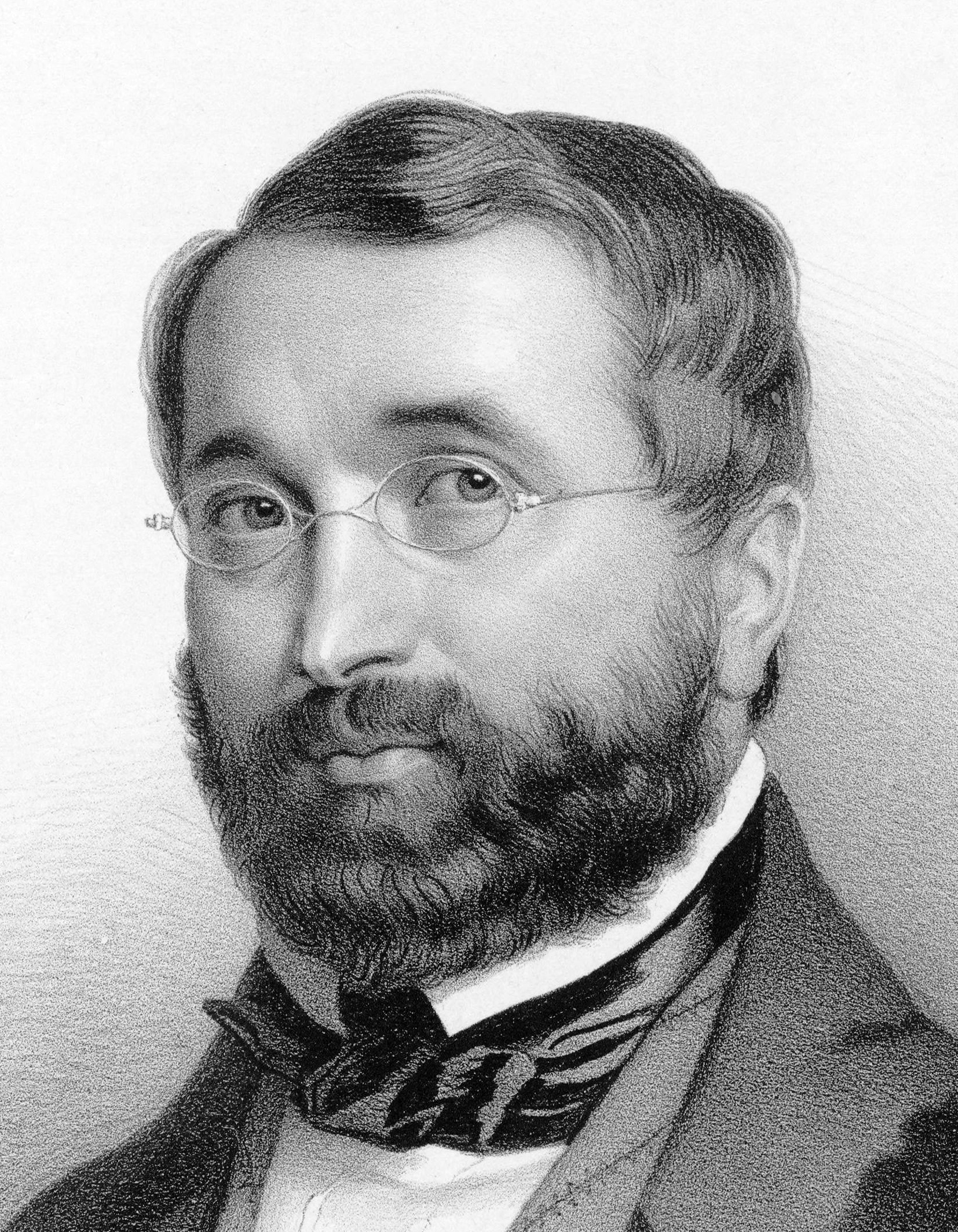
Placide Cappeau (left), lyricist, and Adolphe Adam (right), composer of "Minuit, chrétiens"

"O Holy Night" originates from Placide Cappeau's 1847 poem Minuit, chrétiens. After stained glass in the parish church of Roquemaure was restored, the local priest Maurice Gilles asked Cappeau to write a new text for the upcoming Christmas Midnight Mass. Cappeau, who had connections to singer Emily Laurey, was introduced to composer Adolphe Adam, then known for works such as Giselle.

Cappeau wrote the poem on 3 December 1847 during a stagecoach journey from Mâcon to Dijon. His understanding of Christian theology came from Jesuit teachers at the Collège de France. The poem draws on themes from the Nativity of Jesus and reflects Cappeau's social and abolitionist views. Its opening line, later the subject of debate, reads: "Midnight, Christians! It is the solemn hour when the Man-God descended unto us, to erase original sin, and to stop the wrath of his Father."

Adam completed the musical setting within days. Cappeau referred to the finished work as "Cantique de Noël".

The most familiar English adaptation was written in 1855 by American critic and minister John Sullivan Dwight. Influenced by Ralph Waldo Emerson, Dwight altered the French text more extensively than required for a direct translation. For example, "O hear the angel voices [...] O night divine" replaced "Await your deliverance [...] Behold the Redeemer". Another English version, "O Night Divine", was produced in the late 19th century by American musician Hart Pease Danks, and both adaptations circulated widely.

=== Lyrics ===
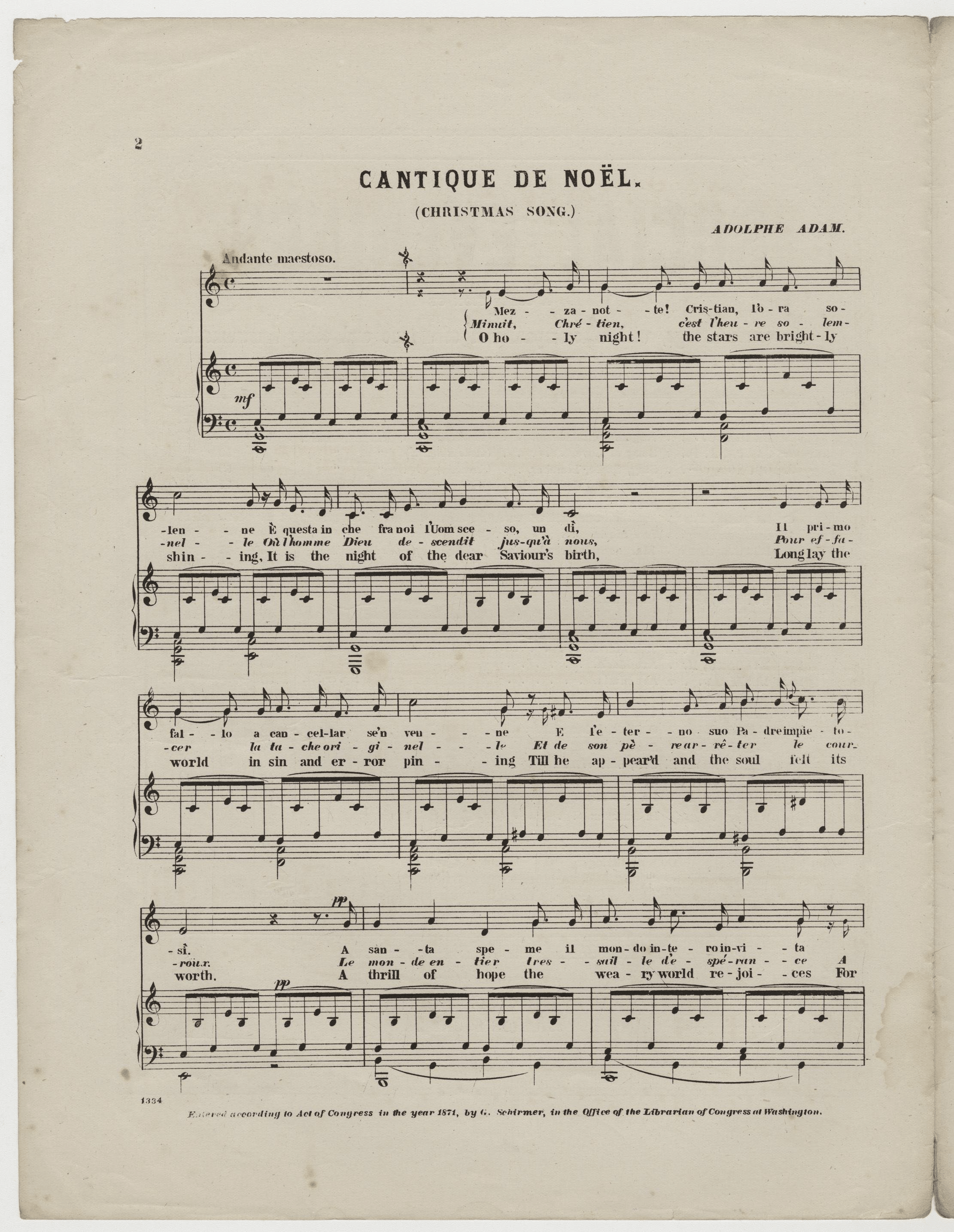
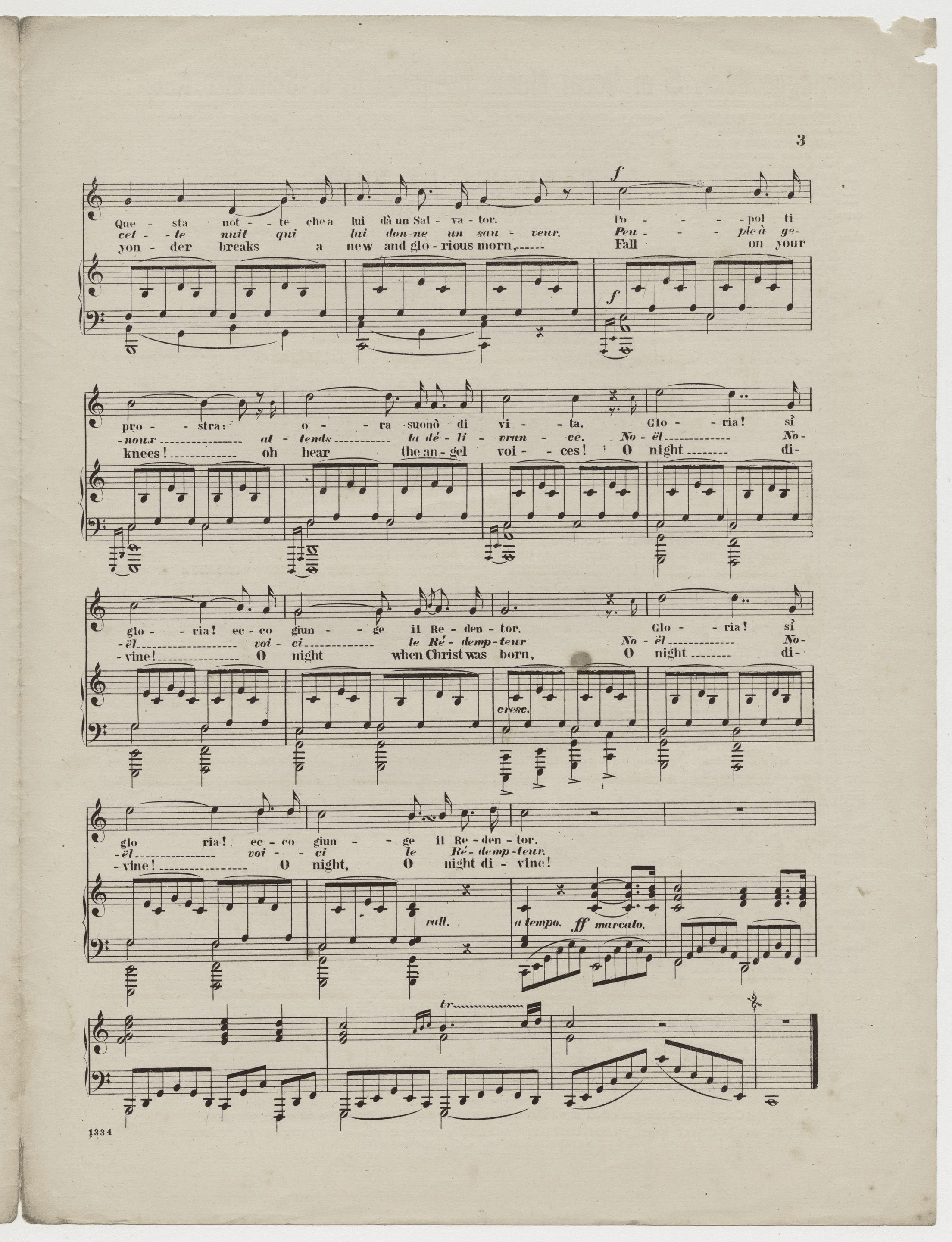
Sheet music for "Cantique de Noël" as it appears in the Social Evenings collection by G. Schirmer Inc., 1871. The lyrics display both the original French by Placide Cappeau and the English text by John Sullivan Dwight.

"Cantique de Noël" (Placide Cappeau, 1847)

Minuit ! Chrétiens, c'est l'heure solennelle
Où l'homme Dieu descendit jusqu'à nous,
Pour effacer la tache originelle
Et de son père arrêter le courroux:
Le monde entier tressaille d'espérance
A cette nuit qui lui donne un sauveur
Peuple à genoux, attends ta délivrance
Noël ! Noël ! Voici le Rédempteur !
Noël ! Noël ! Voici le Rédempteur !

De notre foi que la lumière ardente
Nous guide tous au berceau de l'enfant
Comme autrefois, une étoile brillante
Y conduisit les chefs de l'Orient
Le Roi des Rois naît dans une humble crèche,
Puissants du jour fiers de votre grandeur,
A votre orgueil c'est de là qu'un Dieu prêche,
Courbez vos fronts devant le Rédempteur !
Courbez vos fronts devant le Rédempteur !

Le Rédempteur a brisé toute entrave,
La terre est libre et le ciel est ouvert
Il voit un frère où n'était qu'un esclave
L'amour unit ceux qu'enchaînait le fer,
Qui lui dira notre reconnaissance?
C'est pour nous tous qu'il naît, qu'il souffre et meurt:
Peuple, debout ! chante ta délivrance,
Noël ! Noël! chantons le Rédempteur !
Noël ! Noël! chantons le Rédempteur !

"O Holy Night" (English version – not a translation – by John Sullivan Dwight, 1855)

O holy night, the stars are brightly shining;
It is the night of the dear Saviour's birth.
Long lay the world in sin and error pining,
Till He appeared and the soul felt its worth.
A thrill of hope, the weary world rejoices,
For yonder breaks a new and glorious morn!
Fall on your knees! O hear the angel voices!
O night divine, O night when Christ was born!
O night divine! O night, O night divine!

Led by the light of faith serenely beaming,
With glowing hearts by His cradle we stand.
So led by light of a star sweetly gleaming,
Here came the wise men from the orient land.
The King of kings lay thus in lowly manger,
In all our trials born to be our friend.
He knows our need, to our weakness no stranger.
Behold your King, before Him lowly bend!
Behold your King, your King, before Him lowly bend!

Truly He taught us to love one another;
His law is love and His gospel is peace.
Chains shall He break, for the slave is our brother;
And in His name all oppression shall cease.
Sweet hymns of joy in grateful chorus raise we;
Let all within us praise His holy name.
Christ is the Lord! Then ever, ever praise we!
His power and glory evermore proclaim!
His power and glory evermore proclaim!

== History ==
"Cantique de Noël" was first performed at Midnight Mass in 1847 in Roquemaure. According to Christmas carol historian William Studwell, the piece was translated into numerous languages and widely adapted "within a generation or so". One of the earliest known publications was an organ arrangement issued around 1855. By 1864 the song had become popular throughout France; the Catholic music journal Revue de Musique Sacrée noted that it "has been performed at many churches during Midnight Masses" and "is sung in the streets, at social gatherings, and at bars with live entertainment."

As originally conceived, the lyrics cast the Jews in a negative light in contrast to the Christians. Indeed, the initial stanza was: "Où dans l'heureux Bethléem, vint au jour, Le messager de la bonne nouvelle Qui fit, des lois de sang, la loi d'amour". ("Where in blessed Bethlehem was born The messenger of the good news Who turned laws of blood into law of love.") This was replaced by: "Où l'homme Dieu descendit jusqu'à nous Pour effacer la faute originelle Et de son Père apaiser le courroux". ("Where the God-man descended to us To erase original sin And appease His Father's wrath.") The change was described as a "happy correction." The original version can be found in *Le château de Roquemaure* under the title "Cantique à l'orgue de Roquemaure."

Following the revolution of 1848, the French poet Alphonse de Lamartine praised "Cantique de Noël" as "a religious Marseillaise", a comparison that caused unease among some observers. According to America magazine, several church leaders criticised the song for what they viewed as its militant tone and questionable theology. They objected in particular to the line "Et de son Père arrêter le courroux" ("to cease the wrath of his Father"), believing it portrayed God as angry and vengeful in contrast to Jesus. As a result, the song was excluded from Catholic hymnals.

Much of the criticism, however, focused on the song's creators. Catholic music critics attacked Cappeau for his political views and personal reputation, and his later break with Christianity drew further disapproval. Adam was also targeted when false rumours circulated that he was Jewish. A notable example occurred in 1930, when composer Vincent d'Indy published an article incorrectly listing Adam among Jewish composers and claiming they were motivated solely by financial gain, in contrast to the article's subject, Richard Wagner.

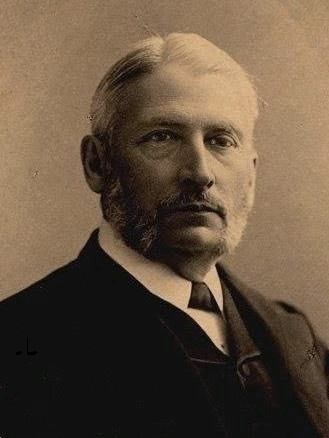
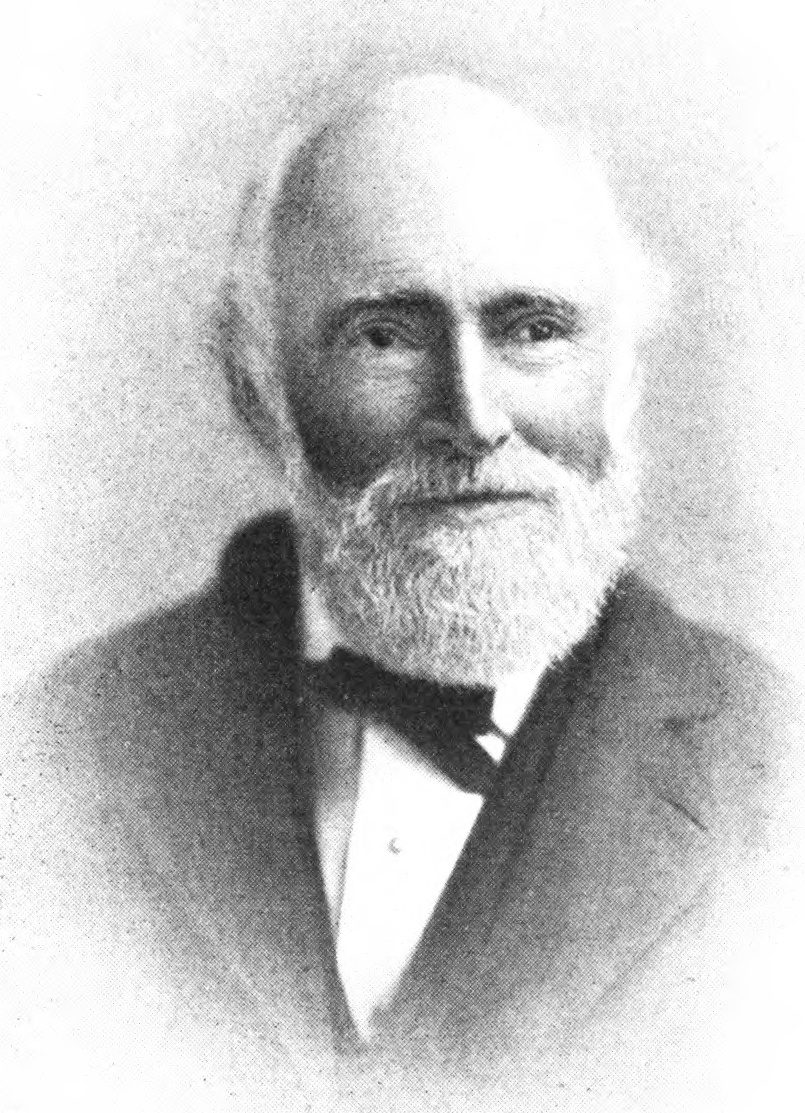
Ernest Gagnon (left) and John Sullivan Dwight (right) helped popularize "O Holy Night" in North America.

In 1864 Revue de Musique Sacrée described "Cantique de Noël" as "debased and degenerated", recommending that it "go its own way, far from houses of religion, which can do very well without it". Despite this, the song's international popularity continued to grow. The Canadian composer and folklorist Ernest Gagnon first heard it at a Midnight Mass at the Church of Saint-Roch and introduced it to Canada in 1858, beginning with a performance in Quebec by the eldest daughter of René-Édouard Caron. Although some ecclesiastical concerns arose there as well, the song became widely embraced, and performances by soloists at Midnight Mass became a tradition.

On 22 September 1936, archbishop Joseph-Guillaume-Laurent Forbes banned "O Holy Night" from churches in the Roman Catholic Archdiocese of Ottawa, along with various other songs, wedding marches, the Canadian national anthem, and many settings of Ave Maria by composers including Franz Schubert, Charles Gounod, Pietro Mascagni, and Jules Massenet. Forbes' secretary stated that the ban aimed to promote the exclusive use of Gregorian chant and Gregorian music.

In the United States, John Sullivan Dwight encountered "O Holy Night" while reviewing music for his publication Dwight's Journal of Music. As an abolitionist, he admired the song's emphasis on human equality, quoting lines such as: "Truly He taught us to love one another; His law is love, and His gospel is peace. Chains shall He break, for the slave is our brother, and in His name all oppression shall cease!" These themes resonated during the American Civil War, and Dwight's publication helped the song gain significant popularity in the North.

Although not formally documented, the first song broadcast over radio is often attributed to inventor Reginald Fessenden's 1906 violin performance of "O Holy Night".

In France, criticism of the song persisted after World War II. Composer Auguste Sérieyx condemned those who performed it on organ or in choirs, as well as the priests who "tolerate or encourage them". By 1956 the song had been "expunged from many dioceses due to the emphatic aspect of its lyrics as much as the music itself, and the contrast they provide with the holiday liturgy", according to the Paris publication Le Dictionnaire du Foyer Catholique.

Since its creation, the song has been associated with various accounts of symbolic or spiritual use. One legend claims that French troops sang it on Christmas Eve in 1870 during the Franco-Prussian War, prompting a temporary ceasefire during trench warfare. In 2004 a Catholic priest reportedly sang the song to a dying American Marine in Fallujah, Iraq.

== Modern usage ==
William Studwell wrote in The Christmas Carol Reader that "O Holy Night" is "the most popular carol in France and belongs in the upper echelon of carols on an international basis". In both French and Canadian traditions, the carol is typically performed as a solo at Midnight Mass. Its demanding high register has become part of its identity, with audiences anticipating whether the singer will reach the climactic notes accurately.

In the late 20th and early 21st centuries, the carol became a staple of Christmas recordings across a wide range of genres. It appears on numerous holiday albums, with notable renditions by Michael Crawford, Mariah Carey, NSYNC, Trans-Siberian Orchestra, Weezer, Josh Groban, Celine Dion, Ella Fitzgerald, Carrie Underwood, and Andrea Bocelli. A 2010 survey by Zogby International ranked "O Holy Night" as the most popular Christmas song in the United States, ahead of "White Christmas" and "The Christmas Song".

=== On record charts ===
The carol has been recorded by many pop, classical, and religious artists, and several versions have appeared on music charts:

- 1994: Mariah Carey's version, from her album Merry Christmas, reached number 70 on the US Billboard Holiday 100 chart. It was re-released as a single in 1996 and 2000, and a live re-recording appears on her 2010 album Merry Christmas II You. In 2023 it was certified platinum by the RIAA.
- 1996: John Berry reached number 55 on the Billboard Hot Country Songs chart.
- 1996: Trans-Siberian Orchestra recorded a medley with "O Come, All Ye Faithful" for Christmas Eve and Other Stories. In 2021 it peaked at number three on the Hard Rock Digital Song Sales chart, and in 2023 it reached number two on Christian Digital Song Sales, number 11 on Rock Digital Song Sales, and number 23 on the Holiday Digital Song Sales chart.
- 1997: Martina McBride reached number 74 on the Hot Country Songs chart, later reappearing at number 67 (1998), number 49 (1999), number 57 (2000), and number 41 (2001).
- 1998: Celine Dion reached number 44 on the Billboard Holiday chart. In 2014, Nielsen SoundScan reported US sales of 240,000 copies.
- 2002: Josh Groban reached number one on the Billboard Adult Contemporary chart.
- 2006: Josh Gracin reached number 59 on the Hot Country Songs chart.
- 2010: The Glee cast reached number one on the US Billboard Holiday Digital Song Sales chart.
- 2012: Ladywell Primary School in Motherwell released a digital version on 21 November 2012, donating 90% of proceeds to the Meningitis Research Foundation in memory of a student who died of meningococcal septicaemia. It reached number 39 on the UK singles chart.
- 2017: Lauren Daigle reached number 14 on the US Billboard Christian adult contemporary chart, number 33 on Hot Christian Songs, and number 33 on Christian Airplay.

=== Charts ===
==== Mariah Carey version ====
Chart performance
| Chart (1994–2023) | Peak position |
|---|---|
| France (SNEP) | 42 |
| Iceland (Íslenski Listinn Topp 40) | 19 |
| Italy (FIMI) | 28 |
| Netherlands (Single Tip) | 9 |
| South Korea International (Circle) | 84 |
| US Holiday 100 (Billboard) | 70 |

==== John Berry version ====
Chart performance
| Chart (1996) | Peak position |
|---|---|
| US Hot Country Songs (Billboard) | 55 |

==== Martina McBride version ====
Chart performance
| Chart (1997–2001) | Peak position |
|---|---|
| US Hot Country Songs (Billboard) | 41 |

==== Celine Dion version ====
Chart performance
| Chart (2013–2025) | Peak position |
|---|---|
| Australia (ARIA) | 57 |
| Canada Digital Song Sales (Billboard) | 36 |
| Global 200 (Billboard) | 84 |
| Ireland (IRMA) | 46 |
| Lithuania (AGATA) | 73 |
| UK Singles (Official Charts) | 62 |
| US Holiday 100 (Billboard) | 44 |

==== Josh Groban version ====
Chart performance
| Chart (2002–2011) | Peak position |
|---|---|
| US Adult Contemporary (Billboard) | 1 |
| US Holiday 100 (Billboard) | 26 |

==== Josh Gracin version ====
Chart performance
| Chart (2006) | Peak position |
|---|---|
| US Hot Country Songs (Billboard) | 59 |

==== Glee cast version ====
Chart performance
| Chart (2010–2011) | Peak position |
|---|---|
| US Holiday Digital Songs (Billboard) | 1 |

==== Ladywell Primary School version ====
Chart performance
| Chart (2012) | Peak position |
|---|---|
| UK Singles (Official Charts) | 39 |

==== Lauren Daigle version ====
Chart performance
| Chart (2017–2018) | Peak position |
|---|---|
| US Hot Christian Songs (Billboard) | 33 |
| US Christian AC (Billboard) | 14 |
| US Christian Airplay (Billboard) | 33 |

==== Trans-Siberian Orchestra version ====
Chart performance
| Chart (2010–2023) | Peak position |
|---|---|
| US Christian Digital Song Sales (Billboard) | 2 |
| US Rock Digital Song Sales (Billboard) | 11 |
| US Hard Rock Digital Song Sales (Billboard) | 3 |
| US Holiday Digital Song Sales (Billboard) | 23 |

==== Ravyn Lenae version ====
Chart performance
| Chart (2025) | Peak position |
|---|---|
| Portugal (AFP) | 183 |
| UK Singles (Official Charts) | 99 |

=== Certifications ===
==== Mariah Carey version ====
Certifications
| Region | Certification | Certified units/sales |
|---|---|---|
| Canada (Music Canada) | Platinum | 80,000^{‡} |
| Denmark (IFPI Danmark) | Gold | 45,000^{‡} |
| Italy (FIMI) | Gold | 35,000^{‡} |
| New Zealand (RMNZ) | Gold | 15,000^{‡} |
| United States (RIAA) | Platinum | 1,000,000^{‡} |
^{‡} Sales+streaming figures based on certification alone.

==== Celine Dion version ====
Certifications
| Region | Certification | Certified units/sales |
|---|---|---|
| Canada (Music Canada) | Platinum | 80,000^{‡} |
^{‡} Sales+streaming figures based on certification alone.

== See also ==
- List of Christmas carols
