= En blanc et noir =

Composition for two pianos by Claude Debussy

- Suite for two pianos by Claude Debussy
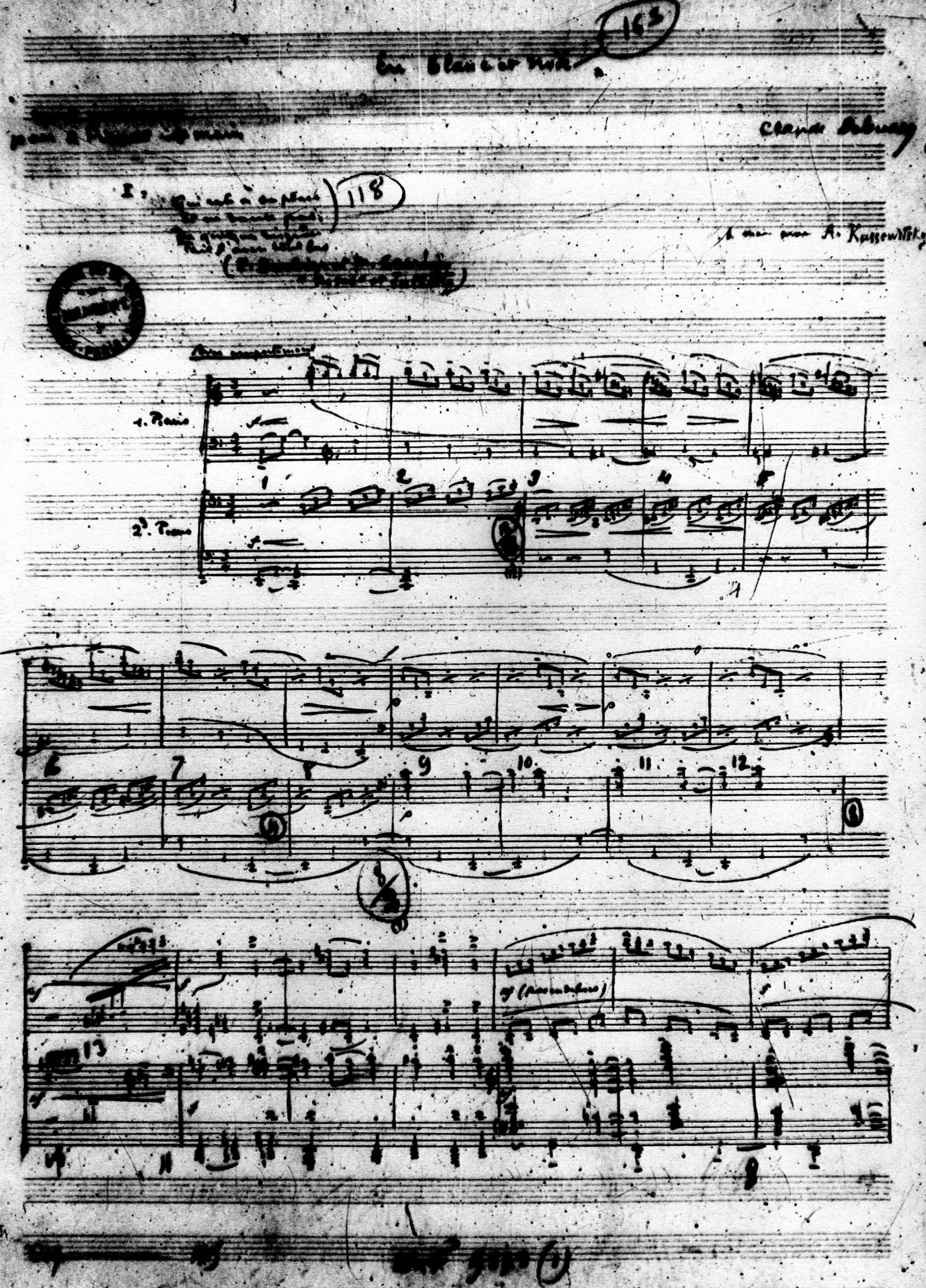
- Manuscript of the beginning
- English: In White and Black
- Other name: Caprices en blanc et noir
- Catalogue: L. 134; CD. 142
- Composed: 1915
- Dedication: Serge Koussevitzky; Jacques Charlot; Igor Stravinsky
- Movements: 3

Premiere
- Date: 21 December 1916
- Location: Paris
- Performers: Claude Debussy; Roger-Ducasse

En blanc et noir (French: [ɑ̃ blɑ̃ e nwaʁ]; English: "In White and Black"), L. 134, CD. 142, is a suite in three movements for two pianos by Claude Debussy, written in June 1915. He composed the work on the Normandy coast, suffering from cancer and concerned about the prospects of France in the Great War. The work is full of personal literary and musical allusions. Each movement comes with a literary motto. In the second movement, Debussy quoted Luther's hymn "Ein feste Burg ist unser Gott" as a symbol of militant Lutheran Germany. The three movements were dedicated respectively to three people: Serge Koussevitzky, Jacques Charlot (an associate of Debussy's publisher who was killed in the war), and Igor Stravinsky.

== History ==
Debussy composed En blanc et noir at his vacation residence on the Normandy coast between 4 and 20 June 1915. He was suffering from cancer. France had been at war since 3 August 1914, and emotions were heated against everything German. The work is a late fruit of his experience as a pianist and composer, and it contains many personal allusions which have not been completely deciphered. In the second movement, he quoted Martin Luther's hymn "Ein feste Burg ist unser Gott", known in English as "A Mighty Fortress Is Our God", as a reference to Lutheran Germany. Around the same time, during a late flourish in his prolific output, he composed his Cello Sonata, Sonata for flute, viola and harp, and the piano Études, to which En blanc et noir is often compared.

In a letter dated 22 July 1915, Debussy wrote to his publisher Jacques Durand, shortly before offering him the composition, that he thought that the "Austro-Boches" were on their last legs (Note: "Meiner Ansicht nach pfeifen die 'Austro-Boches' auf dem letzten Loch.") and that the French soul would always remain clear and heroic. (Note: "Die französische Seele wird stets klar und heroisch bleiben.") By saying "Austro-Boches", Debussy mentioned Austrians and Germans together, influenced by a tendency among French intellectuals to boycott artists and art, literature and music from all German-speaking countries and focus on French traditions.

The original title of the composition was Caprices en blanc et noir, and it was first performed under this title on 21 January 1916 at a private charity concert (to benefit struggling musicians) in the Paris salon of the Princesse de Polignac by Walter Morse Rummel and Thérèse Chaigneau (sister of Suzanne Chaigneau). The first public performance took place on 9 March 1916 in the Casino St-Pierre in Geneva by Marie Panthès and Alexandre Mottu. The composer and Jean Roger-Ducasse performed the work for the first time under its shortened title on 21 December 1916 at another charity benefit (for prisoners of war) in the Paris home of Madame Georges Guiard.

The title En blanc et noir refers not only to the piano keys, but also had another meaning, as Debussy explained in a letter to Robert Gode: "These pieces need to draw their colour, their emotion, simply from the piano, like the 'greys' of Velázquez, if you understand me." Diego Velázquez, the 17th-century Spanish painter, achieved nuances of grey by shading black and white. Debussy used a similar technique with orchestral "colours", in this case represented on two pianos. It has also been proposed that the title was inspired by lines 15–16 of François Villon's poem "Le Débat du cueur et du corps de Villon" ("The dispute of the heart and body of François Villon"): "Rien ne congnois. Si fais : mouches en laict : L’ung est blanc, l’autre est noir, c’est la distance"/"Fly in the milk: the milk was white; the black fly stains it".

Conservative romantic Camille Saint-Saëns, complaining about the style of the music, condemned the work, saying "We must at all costs bar the door of the Institut [de France] against a man capable of such atrocities; they should be put next to the cubist pictures."

== Music ==
En blanc et noir consists of three movements, each preceded by a literary quotation.

=== I. Avec emportement ===
The first movement is marked Avec emportement. An energetic waltz, it is in C major and 3/4 time, . = 66.

The movement is dedicated to Serge Koussevitzky, a musician friend from allied Russia. Debussy prefaced the movement by an excerpt from Barbier and Carré's libretto for Gounod's Roméo et Juliette. The motto translates to "He who stays in his place and does not dance quietly admits to a disgrace." Debussy may have found himself a disgrace as he could not participate in the "dance" of fighting for France due to his illness.

=== II. Lent. Sombre ===
The second movement is marked Lent. Sombre. It is in F major and 6/8 time, . = 42.

The movement is prefaced by a passage from Villon's Ballade contre les ennemis de la France. Debussy had set some of the ballads by the 15th-century poet to music. The quotation is chosen from a ballad "against France's enemies". The movement is dedicated to the memory of Jacques Charlot, a business associate of Debussy's publisher Durand who had been killed in the war. It has been called a political comment of unexpected intensity. (Note: "Politischer Kommentar von unerwarteter Intensität.") The German hymn "Ein feste Burg" by Martin Luther is quoted in the foreground, with a focus on its military aspect, while the French Marseillaise appears almost hidden.

=== III. Scherzando ===
The third movement is marked Scherzando. The playful scherzo is in D minor and 2/4 time, = 72.

Dedicated to Igor Stravinsky, another musician from Russia, the movement is prefaced by a quote from another 15th-century poet, Charles of Orléans: "Yver, vous n'estes qu'un vilain" (Winter, you are nothing but a villain). Debussy had earlier set the poem containing the line for choir a cappella, an "outburst against a hostile force".

== Performances and recordings ==
Pianists Richard Goode and Jonathan Biss played En blanc et noir as the final work in a recital at Queen Elizabeth Hall in London on 31 May 2008, which also included Schubert's Allegro in A minor, Debussy's arrangement of Schumann's Canons for pedal-piano, Beethoven's transcription of the Große Fuge and Stravinsky's Agon.

On a 2008 recording, Vladimir Ashkenazy and his son Vovka played En blanc et noir together with other works by Debussy and Ravel, including Ravel's Rapsodie espagnole and La Valse. A review described their playing as swirling but clear in the first movement, painting "a bleak and devastated landscape" in the second, and in the third with "an understatement which is breathtaking".

A 2015 recording by the Duo Tal & Groethuysen combines the work with another work written in response to the World War, Reynaldo Hahn's Le ruban dénoué, composed at the front near Verdun, where the volunteer soldier experienced anxiety, fascination and deadly boredom. (Note: "Angst, Faszination und tödliche Langeweile.") A cycle of twelve waltzes recalls the 19th-century balls in nostalgic reminiscence.

== Evaluation ==
En blanc et noir has been regarded as a subtle comment on the historical condition through literary and musical allusion, under the sparkling surface of brilliant pianistic artistry, (Note: "Unter der schillernden Oberfläche raffinierter Klavierkunst.") making it a key work of 1915.
