= Studwell =

Studwell is a given name and a surname.

Notable people with the given name include:

- Studwell Bennett (1796–1868), English cricketer

Notable people with the surname include:

- Scott Studwell (born 1954), American football player
- William Studwell (1936–2010), American librarian
