= Robert Lortat =

French pianist (1885–1938)

Robert Lortat (12 September 1885 – 5 May 1938) was a French pianist, well known in his native Paris and in other musical centres including London. He was closely associated with the works of Frédéric Chopin and Gabriel Fauré. Ill health caused by German gas during the First World War restricted his post-war career and led to his early death at the age of 52.

== Life and career ==
Lortat was born in the 17th arrondissement of Paris on 12 September 1885. He studied at the Paris Conservatoire under Louis Diémer, whose other students included Alfred Cortot, Robert Casadesus and Alfredo Casella. At the age of fifteen he won the conservatoire's first prize and in 1909 he was awarded the Diémer Prize by a jury comprising Camille Saint-Saëns, Jules Massenet, Emil von Sauer, Moriz Rosenthal, Moritz Moszkowski and Enrique Granados. He made his professional debut the following year in Paris, after which he toured Germany. He was one of the few pianists to perform cycles of Chopin's solo piano music, received with enthusiasm in Paris and later in London.

Lortat was closely associated with the works of Gabriel Fauré, who dedicated the 12th piano nocturne to him. Fauré wrote, "Robert Lortat is not only a very brilliant virtuoso amongst those at present in the public eye, he is an excellent musician, who loves music and makes others love it". In the first half of 1914 Lortat gave four lecture-recitals on Faure's music at the Université des Annales in Paris, and later repeated them in London, as well as performing the composer's complete piano works there as part of a "Fauré Festival" in which other performers included Leonora Speyer, Frank Bridge, Ivor James and the composer.

During the First World War Lortat served in the French army. He survived an attack of poison gas, but his health was permanently damaged. During the 1920s, because of the continued ill health caused by the gas, he gave fewer concerts, and concentrated on teaching and recording. His recordings were all of works by Chopin. Like his teacher, Diémer, he was interested in music of earlier eras, and played the harpsichord in baroque music.

In concerts in the 1920s Lortat performed with the violinist Jacques Thibaud and was soloist in concertos from time to time. He was the pianist at the premiere of Fauré's Second Piano Quintet in May 1921. The critic Louis Vuillemin described him as "one of the most accomplished virtuosos of this period [with] unparalleled insights into Gabriel Fauré's piano works".

Lortat died in Paris on 5 May 1938; his early death at the age of fifty-two was a direct result of the gas inhalation.

== References and sources ==
=== Sources ===
- Jones, J. Barrie (1989). Gabriel Fauré: A Life in Letters. London: B T Batsford. ISBN 978-0-7134-5468-0.
