= Thérèse Dussaut =

French pianist and music educator

Thérèse Dussaut (born 20 September 1939) is a French pianist and music educator.

== Life ==
Born in Versailles, the daughter of composers Robert Dussaut and Hélène Covatti, Thérèse Dussaut studied piano in France with Marguerite Long and Pierre Sancan and in Germany with the Russian pianist Vladimir Horbowski. She won prizes at the Conservatoire de Paris and the State University of Music and Performing Arts Stuttgart. In 1957 she won first prize at the ARD International Music Competition in piano.

After graduation, she began an international career as a concert pianist. Her repertoire includes works by contemporary composers such as Charles Chaynes's Piano Concerto and Léon Mouravieff's Strophe, Antistrophe and Epode.

From 1987 to 1995 she was artistic director of the Cévennes Festival, which she founded. Between 1988 and 2000 she ran a summer university. She has given master classes in the USA, Russia, Germany and Ukraine and teaches a master class for piano at the Toulouse Conservatory. Among her students are the pianists Patrick Lechner, Elif Sahin-Nesweda, Nina Prešiček, Peter Schedding, Felix Romankiewicz, Asli Kilic, Sora Dietzinger and Mayumi Asano. Dussaut also served as a juror at the International Tchaikovsky Competition and the Horowitz Competition.
