= Júlia d'Almendra =

Portuguese musicologist and pedagogue (1904–1992)

- Born: 3 October 1904; Vila Flor, Portugal
- Died: 22 September 1992 (aged 87); Lisbon
- Occupation(s): Musicologist and teacher
- Known for: Promotion of the Gregorian chant
- Awards: Ordre des Palmes académiques (France); Pro Ecclesia et Pontifice (Vatican); Order of Public Instruction (Portugal)

Júlia d'Almendra (1904 – 1992) was a Portuguese musicologist, pedagogue, organist and violinist. In particular, she made a significant contribution to the dissemination of Gregorian chant in Portugal, being responsible for founding the first higher education school of sacred music.

== Early life ==
D'Almendra was born on 3 October 1904 in the village of Samões in the municipality of Vila Flor in the north of Portugal. She studied at the National Conservatory of Lisbon, where she completed a higher-level violin course. She appeared in several concerts, including one at the Teatro Nacional de São Carlos when she was just eleven. However, she abandoned her violin career in the 1930s, when she began to study medieval and Renaissance music.

== First Contact with Gregorian chant ==
In the early 1940s, the French musicologist Solange Corbin was in Portugal, where she began research in church and convent archives on the oldest documentary sources of Gregorian music. D'Almendra had the opportunity to study with this French musicologist after attending a lecture she gave at the French Institute, which profoundly influenced her. She continued her studies with Fathers Inácio Aldasoro and Pascal Piriou, professors at the Olivais Seminary in Lisbon.

== Studies in Paris ==
In 1946, she left Portugal for Paris, on a French government scholarship, remaining there until 1950. She studied at the Sorbonne University and at the Gregorian Institute of Paris. In 1948, she presented her undergraduate thesis, Les modes grégoriens dans l'ouvre de Claude Debussy (Gregorian modes in the work of Claude Debussy), which was considered by international critics as an important contribution to the knowledge of the French composer's work. At the Institute she earned the title of "Master of the Chapel".

== Dissemination of Gregorian chant in Portugal ==
D'Almendra returned to Portugal in 1950 and, in April, organized the First Gregorian and Liturgical Week in Fátima, which was attended by 150 students. At the same time, she also organized Gregorian Days in all the country's dioceses. In 1951, she founded the League of Friends of Gregorian chant, and in March 1953, under the sponsorship of the Portuguese Institute for High Culture, she founded the Centre for Gregorian Studies, the first higher education school of sacred music in Portugal. She was a member of the teaching staff and, with the nationalization of that school in 1976 (at her request), served on the installation committee of the Gregorian Institute of Lisbon, until her retirement due to her advanced age. Although she could no longer teach at the school she had founded, she continued her research activities until her death. In addition to her work on Gregorian chants, D'Almendra was noted for promoting the organ as an artistic instrument, bringing to Portugal notable musicologists and organists such as Jean Guillou, Jacques Chailley, Gaston Litaize and Édouard Souberbielle, who both performed and trained the new generation of Portuguese organists.

In addition to teaching, in 1956 D'Almendra created the magazine Gregorian Chant, a quarterly publication on the subject, which she edited for three decades. She also published numerous articles in national and international magazines and newspapers and gave lectures in Portugal, France, and Brazil.

== Recognition ==
In 1958, D'Almendra was made a Knight of the French Ordre des Palmes académiques for her musicological research on Debussy and Gabriel Fauré. She was awarded the Pro Ecclesia et Pontifice medal by the Vatican on the 25th Anniversary of the Gregorian Weeks. In Portugal, in September 1984, she was awarded the rank of Commander of the Order of Public Instruction.

== Death ==
D'Almendra died in Lisbon on 22 September 1992. Posthumously, she was honoured in 1992 by the Portuguese Association of Friends of the Church Organ.
