= Auguste Durand =

French music publisher, organist, and composer

Marie-Auguste Massacrié-Durand (French pronunciation: [maʁi oɡyst masakʁije dyʁɑ̃]; 18 July 1830 – 31 May 1909) was a French music publisher, organist, and composer.

== Biography ==
Durand was born in Paris and studied at the Paris Conservatoire with François Benoist. He started as an organist in 1849 in Saint-Ambroise, then at St. Genevieve, St. Roch and St. Vincent de Paul (1862–74). He also worked as a music educator. Composer Gustave Gagnon studied harmony with him.

== A. Durand & fils ==
Together with Louis Schoenewerk and other sponsors, Durand founded the company Durand-Schoenewerk & Cie. in December 1869 and acquired the important catalogue of the Paris music publisher Gustave Flaxland (1821–1895), which had grown from approximately 1,200 titles in 1847 to 1,400 titles in 1869. This included the French rights to the early Wagner operas. Following a dispute, the company dissolved on 18 March 1885 and was sold at auction in May 1896. Auguste Durand and Louis Schoenewerk bought the firm in its entirety, and they reconstituted the company with Durand's son Jacques (1865–1928).

In November 1891, Jacques replaced Schoenewerk and the name changed to A. Durand & fils. Jacques assumed control of the company in 1909 when his father died, and brought in his cousin Gaston Choisnel (d. 1921) as a partner.

Durand became an expert in the publication of works by French composers including Victorin de Joncières, Edouard Lalo, Jules Massenet, Claude Debussy, Camille Saint-Saëns, Maurice Ravel, Albert Roussel and Paul Dukas. The company also published the French editions of Tannhäuser, The Flying Dutchman and Lohengrin by Richard Wagner and many editions of old masters including, in particular, a complete critical edition of Rameau edited under the initial direction of Saint-Saëns.

Between 1910 and 1913, Auguste and, after his death, his son Jacques organised concerts to raise awareness of new music. In 1914, Jacques published under the title Édition classique Durand & fils important nineteenth-century works for piano including the music of Chopin edited by Debussy, of Mendelssohn by Ravel and of Schumann by Gabriel Fauré.

In 1947, the company was reorganised as a Société à responsabilité limitée. In 1982, the house of Durand created a new catalogue of contemporary music. In 1987, the company acquired the publishers Max Eschig and Amphion. In the early 1990s, it acquired the classical music catalogue of Rideau Rouge. In 2000, the company was bought by BMG and merged with Salabert to be known as Durand-Salabert-Eschig, and since 2007 the company is a part of Universal Music Publishing Group.

== Works ==
- First Waltz in E-flat Major, Opus 83, No.1
- Cours professionnel à l'usage des employés de commerce de musique (two volumes, 1923),
- Quelques souvenirs d'un éditeur de musique (two volumes, 1924–5),
- Lettres de Claude Debussy à son éditeur (Paris, 1927).

== Bibliography ==
- 1869–1969: Livre du Centenaire des Éditions Durand & Cie. (Paris, 1969).
- Anik Devriès & François Lesure: Dictionnaire des éditeurs de musique français, vol. 2: De 1820 à 1914 (Geneva: Minkoff, 1988), p. 151–3.
- Marc Honegger (ed.): Dictionnaire de la musique publié (Paris: Bordas, 1993), ISBN 2-04-019973-X.
- Théodore Baker & Nicolas Sloninsky (eds.): Dictionnaire bibliographique des musiciens (Paris: Robert Laffont, 1995), ISBN 2-221-06510-7.
- Joël-Marie Fauquet (ed.): Dictionnaire de la musique en France au XIXe siècle (Paris: Fayard, 2003), ISBN 2-213-59316-7.
