= Placide Cappeau =

French poet

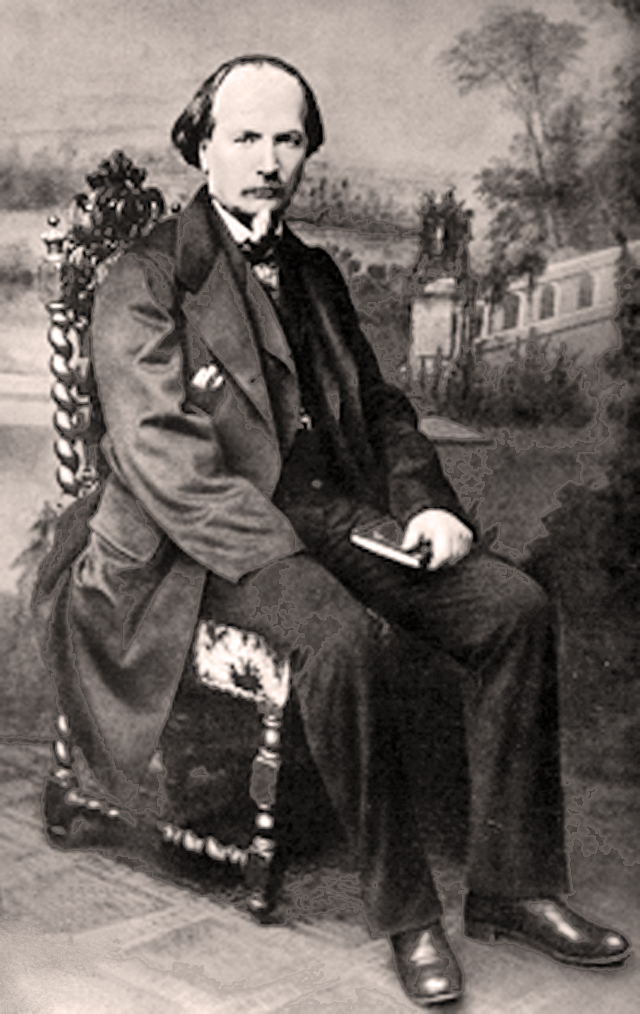
- Born: Placide Cappeau; 25 October 1808
- Died: 8 August 1877 (aged 68)

Placide Cappeau (25 October 1808 – 8 August 1877) was a French poet and the author of the poem "Minuit, chrétiens" (1847), set to music by Adolphe Adam and known in English as "O Holy Night" or "Cantique de Noël".

== Biography ==
He was born on 25 October 1808 in Roquemaure, Gard. He was the son of Mathieu Cappeau, a cooper, and Agathe Louise (née Martinet). He was expected to follow his father in the family business (vinification and cooperage), but after an accident, he turned to the life of an academic. While he was at play as an eight-year-old, his friend Brignon was handling a gun and shot Cappeau in the hand. Cappeau's hand was amputated. With the financial support of Brignon's father, who supplied half the tuition, Cappeau attended a town school and then the Collège Royal d'Avignon. There he was awarded the first prize in drawing in 1825.

After studying in Nîmes, where he received a baccalauréat littéraire (A level in literature), he studied law in Paris and was awarded a license to practice law in 1831. Following in his father's footsteps, he became a merchant of wines and spirits.

Cappeau was known locally as a poet. On a business trip to Paris in December 1847, at the request of his local priest, he composed his Christmas-themed text and, as his local priest had requested, presented it to Adam to set it to music, the request based on their shared acquaintance with a singer, a certain Madame Laurey, who was then living near Roquemaure where her husband, a civil engineer, was supervising the construction of a bridge. He later said he wrote the poem "Minuit, chrétiens" in a stagecoach en route to Paris, between Mâcon and Dijon. Alphonse de Lamartine dubbed the resulting carol "la Marseillaise religieuse" (The religious Marseillaise).

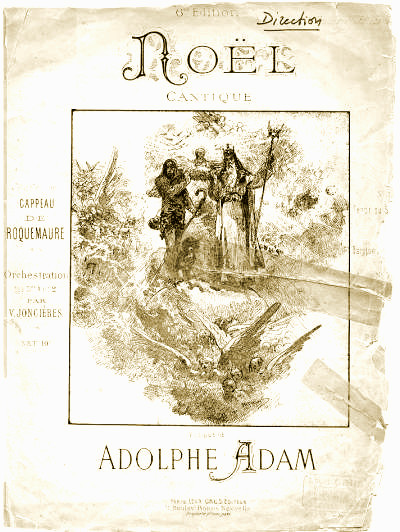

Cappeau's other works include the 4000-line philosophical poem Le château de Roquemaure (1876), Le roi de la fève, La poésie, Le papillon and La rose. He wrote in Provençal as well as in French.

He was a friend of some of the great writers of the Félibrige, including Frédéric Mistral, Joseph Roumanille, and Alphonse Daudet. He knew Alphonse de Lamartine as well.

Late in life he apostatized and adopted views as a non-Christian that were at odds with his fame as the author of a Christmas text.

Cappeau opposed slavery and inequality in all forms and was sympathetic to socialism.

He died on 8 August 1877 in Roquemaure at the age of 68. He was buried in his family's crypt in Roquemaure cemetery.

== Bibliography ==
- Durieu (abbé René), L'auteur du "Minuit chrétiens", Placide Cappeau, Nîmes, Lacour, 1996.
