= Vila Flor =

- Municipality
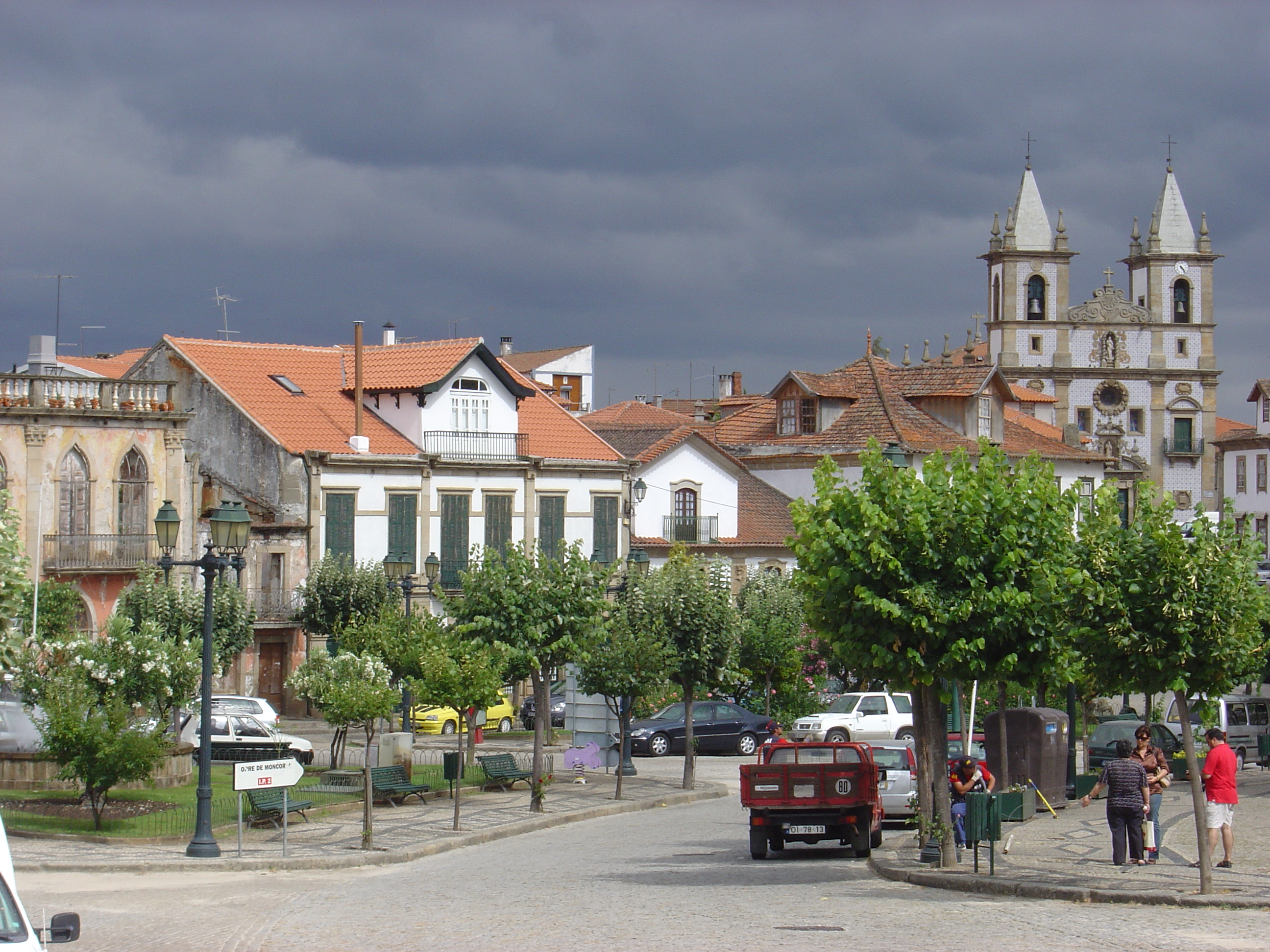
- The central square of Vila Flor

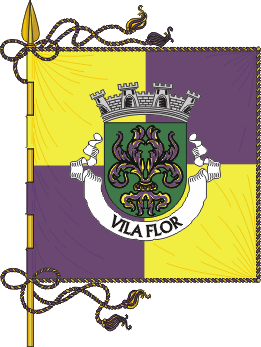
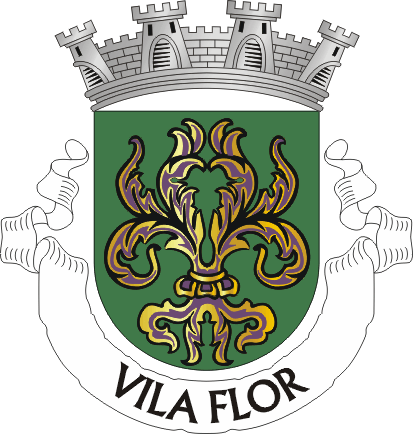
- Flag Coat of arms
- Interactive map of Vila Flor
- Coordinates: 41°18′33″N 7°9′14″W
- Country: Portugal
- Region: Norte
- Intermunic. comm.: Terras de Trás-os-Montes
- District: Bragança
- Parishes: 14

Government
  - President: Artur Guilherme Gonçalves Vaz Pimentel (PS)

Area
  - Total: 265.81 km^{2} (102.63 sq mi)

Population (2011)
  - Total: 6,697
  - Density: 25.19/km^{2} (65.25/sq mi)
- Time zone: UTC+00:00 (WET)
  - Summer (DST): UTC+01:00 (WEST)
- Postal code: 5360
- Area code: 278
- Website: http://www.cm-vilaflor.pt

Vila Flor (Portuguese pronunciation: [ˈvilɐ ˈfloɾ]) is a municipality in Portugal. Locally referred to as the Portuguese Capital of Olive Oil, Vila Flor is located in the Terra Quente Transmontana, in the southern part of the district of Bragança. The population in 2011 was 6,697, in an area of 265.81 square kilometres (102.63 mi^{2}).

== History ==
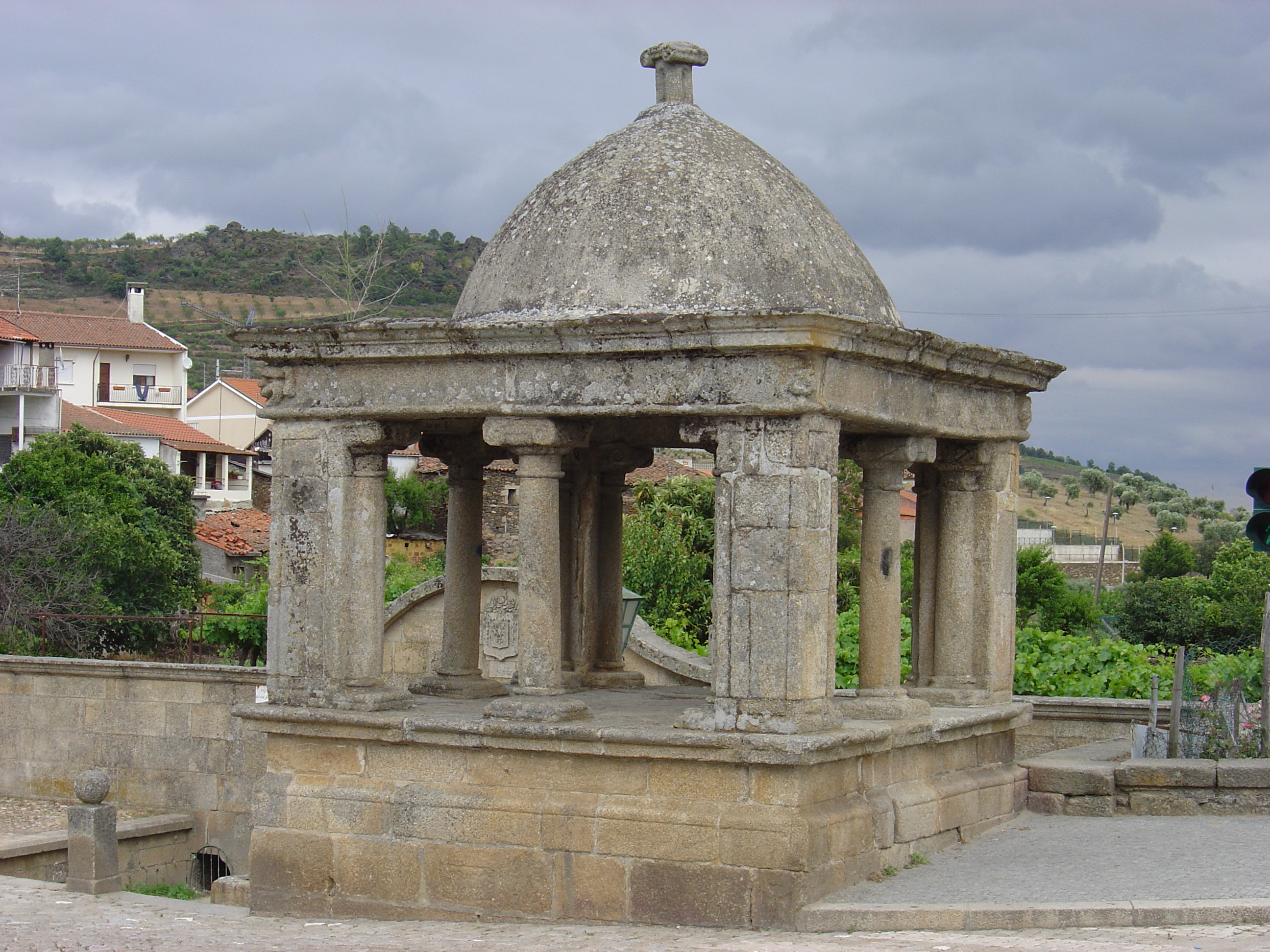
The Roman fountain isolating human settlement to that period

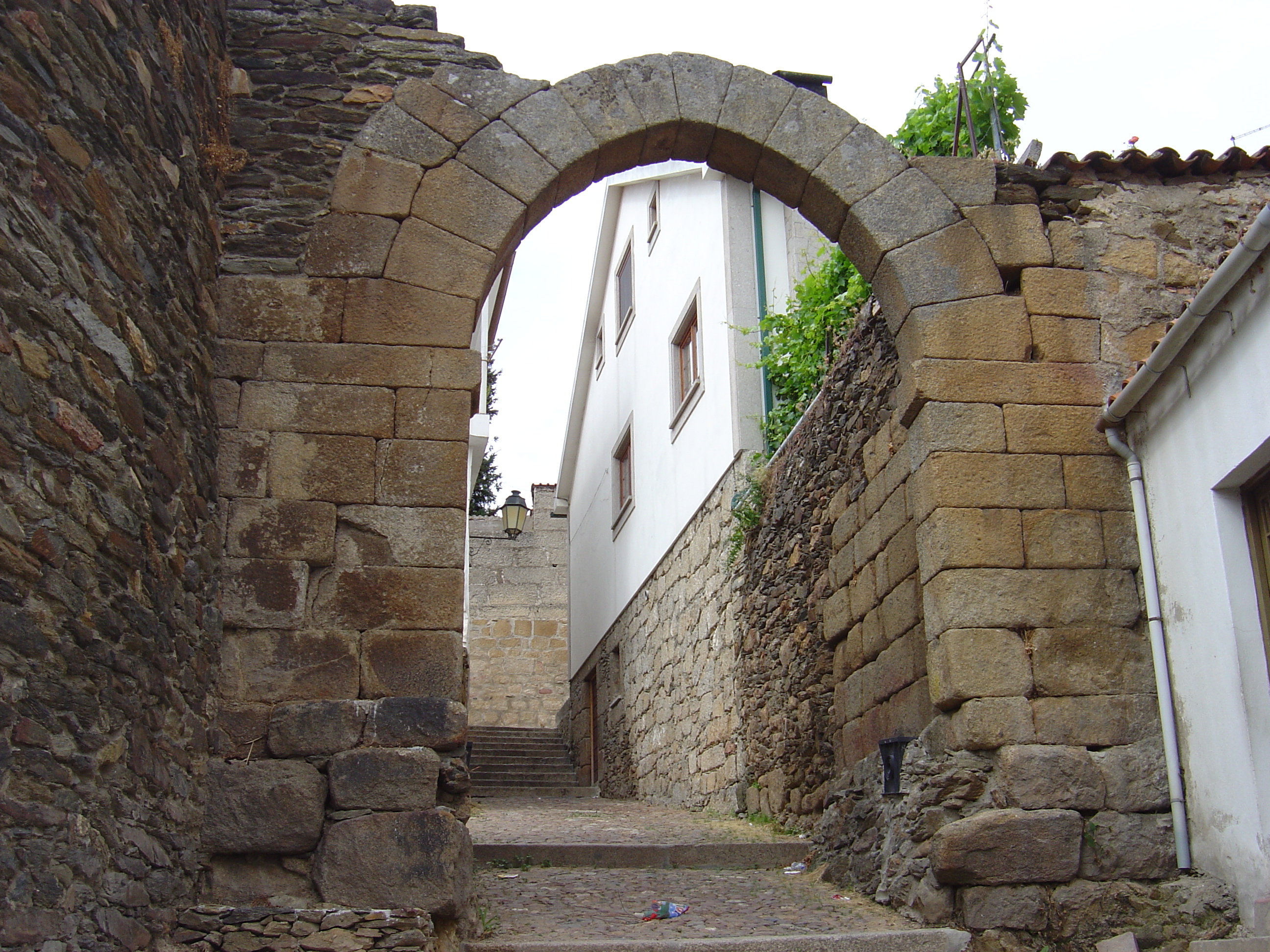
One of the remaining archway gates of the walled city of Póvoa d´Álem Sabor

It was King Denis who, while travelling through the burg (then known as Póvoa d´Álem Sabor, became enchanted by the local landscape and, in 1286, renamed the district Vila Flor. Around 1295, the King ordered the construction of a walled city, consisting of five gates, to protect the fledgling settlement and guard Portuguese interests in the territory.

During the Middle Ages, this bouquet of flowers, as Cabral Adão (1910, in Vila Flor - 1992, in Almada), Vila Flor-born stomatology doctor and writer, once called it, became the home to many fleeing Jewish families, who settled in the territory to start farms and businesses of small industry (such as tanneries and jewelers). King Manuel eventually conferred on the settlement an official charter (foral), later to be reformulated in May 1512. Having favorable, tolerant views towards Portuguese Jews until he decided to marry Infanta Isabella of Aragon, Manuel I agreed to persecute the Jews of Portugal because the anti-Semite parents of his fiancée wouldn't approve that policy. King Manuel expelled the Jews from the municipality, whose remaining peoples or the army were then responsible for destroying the homes of the expelled Jews.

== Geography ==
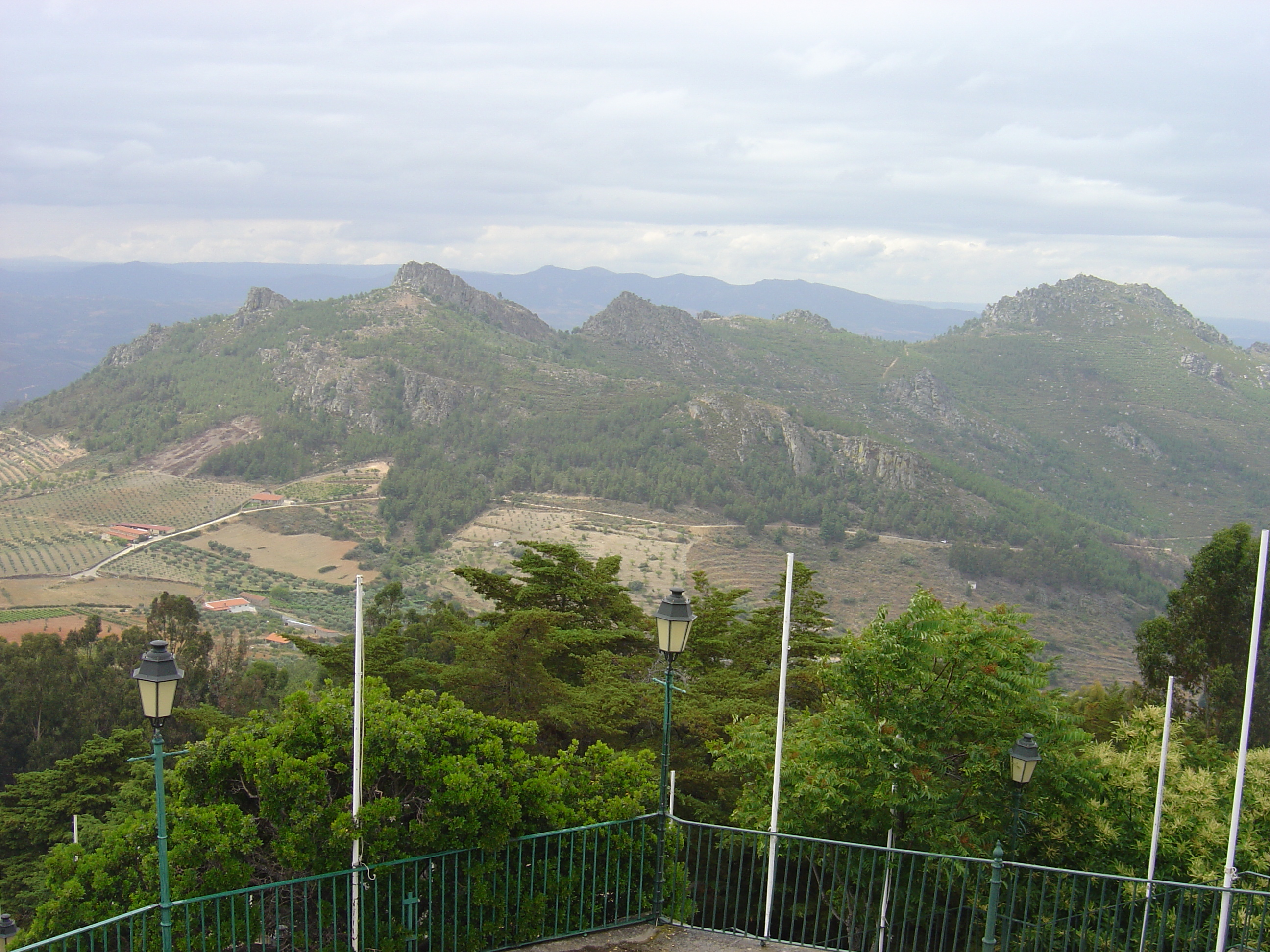
The mountainous terrain that divides the Vale de Vilariça

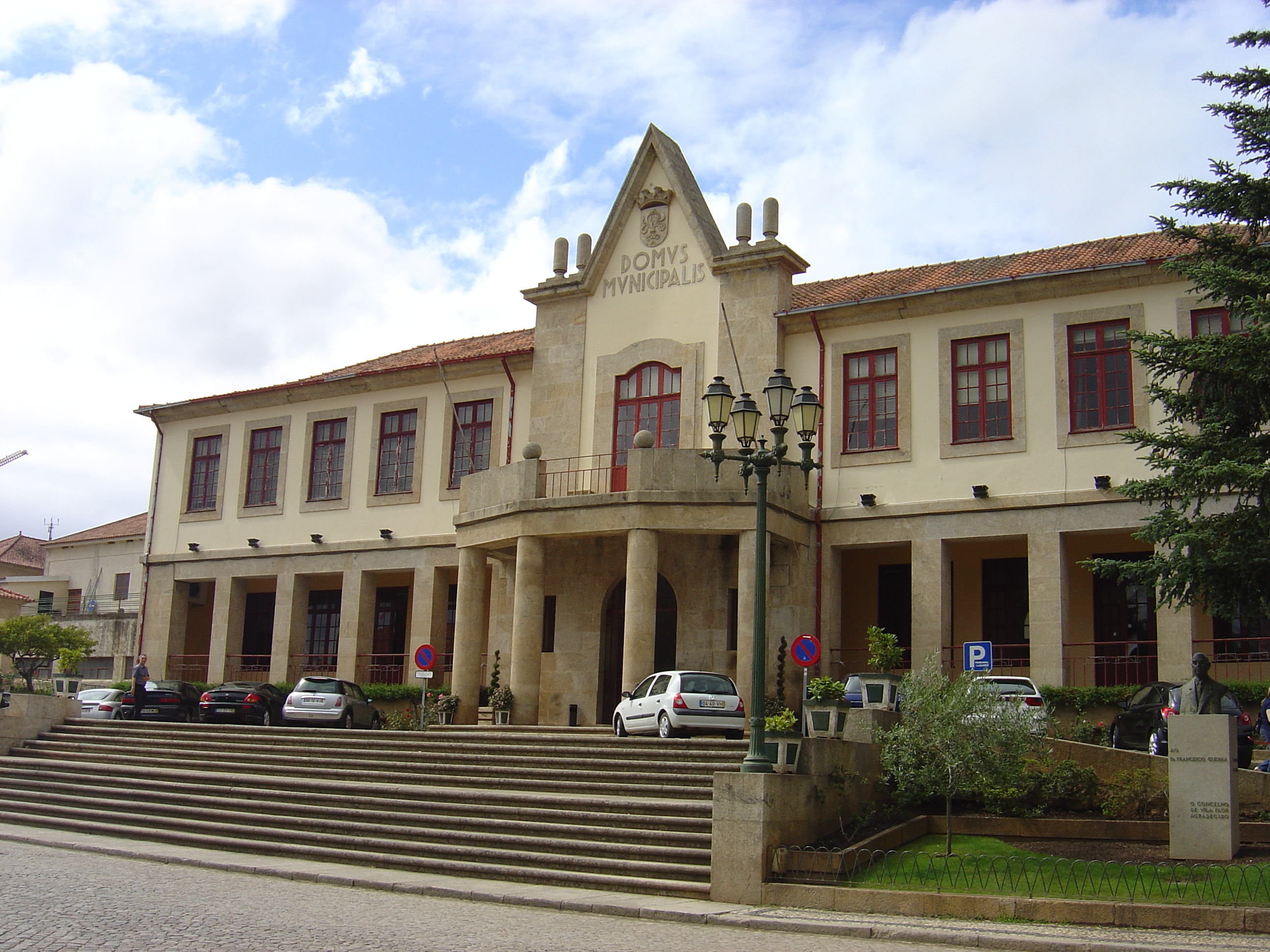
The municipal council offices and building along Avenida Marchel Carmona

Administratively, the municipality is divided into 14 civil parishes (freguesias):

- Assares e Lodões
- Benlhevai
- Candoso e Carvalho de Egas
- Freixiel
- Roios
- Samões
- Sampaio
- Santa Comba de Vilariça
- Seixo de Manhoses
- Trindade
- Vale Frechoso
- Valtorno e Mourão
- Vila Flor e Nabo
- Vilas Boas e Vilarinho das Azenhas

=== Climate ===
Vila Flor has a Mediterranean climate with hot, dry summers and cold, wet winters.

Climate data for Folgares, 1980-2021, altitude: 739 m (2,425 ft)
Month	Jan	Feb	Mar	Apr	May	Jun	Jul	Aug	Sep	Oct	Nov	Dec	Year
Daily mean °C (°F)	5.3 (41.5)	6.8 (44.2)	9.4 (48.9)	10.8 (51.4)	14.3 (57.7)	18.7 (65.7)	21.7 (71.1)	21.7 (71.1)	18.8 (65.8)	14.1 (57.4)	8.7 (47.7)	6.0 (42.8)	13.0 (55.4)
Average precipitation mm (inches)	51.9 (2.04)	45.7 (1.80)	42.8 (1.69)	58.5 (2.30)	56.1 (2.21)	31.2 (1.23)	13.0 (0.51)	15.2 (0.60)	29.8 (1.17)	77.6 (3.06)	75.1 (2.96)	76.2 (3.00)	573.1 (22.57)
Source: Portuguese Environment Agency

== Economy ==
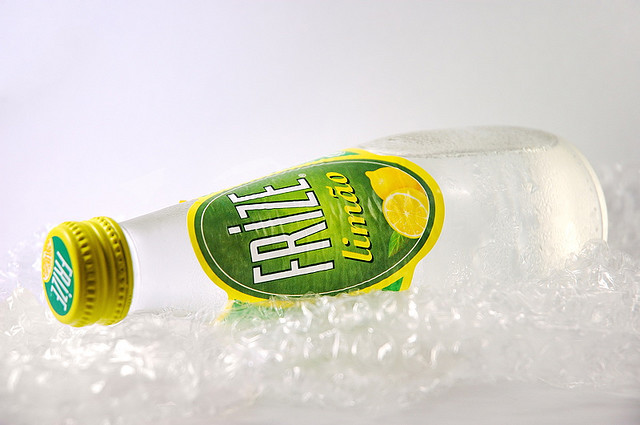
Frize carbonated mineral water, a Sumol + Compal brand, has its production site in Vila Flor.

Rich in history, tradition, monuments and citizenry, the municipality is also an important reference for agriculture, owing to the fertility of the Vilariça Valley (Vale da Vilariça). Olive oil and chestnut are among its main agricultural productions. Companies, such as Frize (a Sumol + Compal sparkling water brand) and Sousacamp (edible mushroom producer), known within and outside of Portugal, are located in within its municipal borders. The growth of tourism has meant that lodgings have developed throughout the region. Hotels and homestays, as well as establishments catering to rural- and agro-tourism, are found in the municipality. This tourist offer includes available options ranging from seasonal treks in the region to the municipal camping site and river beaches.

== Notable citizens ==
- Joaquim Trigo de Negreiros (born 1900), lawyer and official of the civil registry, president of the administrative council of Vila Flor, before moving to Porto, becoming assistance Attorney of Portugal, Civil Governor of Porto, Subsecretary of State for Corporations and Social Security, and the Secretary of State for Social Security, in addition to providing public security forces with new equipment. For eight years he was minister of the Domestic Affairs, closed Tarrafal in 1954, and as member of the Parliament in various legislatures, he was responsible for implementing the modern public health system: he originated the Hospital Escolar de Santa Maria and the Hospital of São João (in Porto), he was also responsible for the growth in nursing instruction (in 1947). He was a founder of the Diário Popular.
- Artur Guilherme Trigo Vaz (born 1919), doctor, municipal councillor (1951–54 and 1964–68), president of the municipal council (1970–74), responsible for Peneireiro Dam, and president/founder of the Sport Clube de Vila Flor; Vaz also dedicated himself to the history of Vila Flor, publishing the O Passado e o Presente, in December 1949.
- Raul de Sá Correia (May 1900 - 8 December 1993), municipal secretary (1934), responsible for the construction of the library, museum and archive. On his retirement he was named honorary citizen of the municipality and attributed a commemorative medal marking the 7th centenary of Vila Flor; a year later President Mário Soares honored him with Order of Henry the Navigator; and on his death a bronze bust was erected in front of his former home, and a hall in the museum dedicated to him.
- Júlia D'Almendra (1904 –1992), musicologist, pedagogue, organist and violinist.
- Francisco Maria Guerra (1876 - 1962), lawyer and administrator of the municipality of Miranda do Douro; conservator of the district land registry and president of the municipality of Vila Flor (1933-1946), he was responsible for a series of public works including the construction of several primary schools, bridges, cemeteries, warehouses, fountains, the opening of many municipal roads, squares and avenues, including Avenida Marechal Carmona. He was honored with the Military Order of Christ, and in 1962 (following his death), a bronze statue was erected in his honor.
- French-Portuguese vocalist Lucenzo (born 1983) traces his origins to Vila Flor, homeland of his parents.
