= Jean-Louis Martinet =

French composer

Jean-Louis Martinet (born 8 November 1912, Sainte-Bazeille, died 20 December 2010) is a French composer. He studied at the Schola Cantorum with Charles Koechlin and at the Conservatoire de Paris with Jean Roger-Ducasse and Olivier Messiaen. He also studied privately with René Leibowitz. In 1971 he was appointed professor at the Conservatoire de musique du Québec à Montréal.
