= Solange Corbin =

French musicologist and professor (1903–1973)

Solange Corbin de Mangoux
- Corbin in 1942
- Born: 5 April 1903; Vorly, France
- Died: 17 September 1973 (aged 70); Bourges, France
- Occupations: Musicologist and teacher
- Known for: Study of religious and secular music from the Middle Ages

Solange Corbin de Mangoux (1903–1973) was a French musicologist specialising in medieval music, particularly the singing repertoires of Latin Christianity. Her most notable contribution was her use of an interdisciplinary approach to research that was different from the approach of the religious institutions that were the depositories of sacred music. In the early 1940s, Corbin was a member of the French Resistance.

== Early life ==
Corbin was born in Vorly in what is now the Centre-Val de Loire region of France on 5 April 1903, to a family that came from the Berry province. She spent her youth on the family estate of Mangoux in Vorly, where she helped her father on the farm while practising the piano. Her mother played the piano, her sister, Geneviève, studied singing and her brother, Abel, played the violin. After completing her secondary education in Bourges, where she learnt Gregorian chants as a member of the Bourges Cathedral school choir, she obtained a Baccalauréat in Paris in 1918 or 1919, while continuing her musical studies. She was a piano student of Blanche Selva and Marthe Dron at the Schola Cantorum de Paris, as well as studying harmony with André Laporte and organ with André Fleury. Between 1929 and 1932 she held the position of substitute chapel teacher in Bourges and later moved to Paris where, between 1937 and 1941, she attended a course in plainsong at the Gregorian Institute of Paris, at the same time earning a living as a secretary.

In 1939, she entered the École pratique des hautes études (EPHE), where she studied history with the medievalist Louis Halphen between 1939 and 1941, and palaeography, the study of handwriting and manuscripts, with Charles Samaran in 1946 and 1947. In 1939 she also entered Sorbonne University, where she was a student of the musicologist, Paul-Marie Masson. She graduated from the Sorbonne in 1946 and then returned to Portugal to complete her research, which was published in 1952. During the occupation of France by the Germans during World War Two, she served as a member of the French Resistance, not only in France but also in Spain, Portugal and Algiers, a fact that was not revealed until her death.

== Research in Portugal ==
In 1940 Corbin joined the French National Centre for Scientific Research (French: Centre national de la recherche scientifique, CNRS). Grants from this association meant that she was able to make visits to Portugal to research the medieval music of the country, particularly in the archives of monasteries. In addition, she began to give lectures, both in France and Portugal. At the same time, in 1940 she joined the Société Française de Musicologie (SFM), maintaining contact with the society through the musicologist Amédée Gastoué, its vice-president, during her stay in Portugal. She also began to submit articles to the SFM's Revue de Musicologie.

Corbin first visited Portugal in 1940. The following year, with a CNRS scholarship, she stayed there for almost a year, during which time she followed the courses of the medieval historian Abbé Pierre David (1882–1955) who, after first leaving Kraków in Poland and then leaving France on the advice of Marshal Pétain, leader of the Vichy France government, had made his way to Portugal. Corbin's first publication was a seven-page account of 15th-century liturgical books from the Aveiro Museum, published in 1943. At the same time, she was continuing to prepare her thesis on medieval religious music in Portugal. This was presented in 1944, when she obtained a diploma from the EPHE in historical and philological sciences, with the work Essai sur la musique religieuse portugaise au Moyen-Age (1100–1385), based on her research in Portugal. This was revised in 1946 during a further two-month stay in Portugal and expanded before its publication in 1952. The documents gathered in Portugal also provided the core of her second book, on the liturgical deposition of Christ on Good Friday.

Corbin brought a European perspective to the study of Portuguese sources, setting aside the nationalist bias of many Portuguese intellectuals of the time. At the same time, her research highlighted the French contribution to the constitution of the medieval religious repertoire in Portugal from the end of the 11th century. The importance of her thesis on medieval religious music in Portugal is considered to be considerable, demonstrating the importance of the oral tradition in the Middle Ages. However, its publication went virtually unnoticed in Portugal, due to the lack of an academic context for its dissemination, and the lack of an ideological context for its promotion, notably among Catholic priests and authors, who appear to have been generally unconcerned with their historical heritage or incapable of grasping its liturgical and musical nuances. Her thesis was composed of two "books". The first, "Studies in History", had over 150 pages of historical synthesis on the Portuguese political and religious context, focusing on the French influence and the issue of rituals. In the second "book", entitled "Studies in Texts", she identified and described the musical sources, bringing together over one hundred manuscripts written between the year 1000 and approximately 1500. At the time, this was the first general list of early monophonic religious music.

Despite its importance, Corbin's work was initially followed closely in Portugal by only two specialists. These were the priest and historian Avelino de Jesus da Costa (1908–2000), a disciple of Abbé Pierre David, and Manuel Joaquim (1894–1986), an amateur musicologist, who was primarily interested in Renaissance polyphony. However, while in Portugal Corbin gave lectures on her topic. Among those influenced by her presentations was the Portuguese musicologist, Júlia D'Almendra, who began to study with her.

== The Resistance ==
Because of the nature of the work, little is known about Corbin's work with the French Resistance and she never said anything in public. It was revealed in 1973 by Denise Jourdan-Hemmerdinger in her obituary of Corbin, citing two testimonies from former resistance fighters. According to the first testimony, from March 1943 to April 1944 she escorted young people who were going clandestinely to Spain, accompanying them to relays located in places such as Pau and Toulouse and providing false papers to young people wishing to escape. According to Jourdan-Hemmerdinger, Corbin sometimes crossed the border to Spain with them and had mentioned several times about "her stay in prison in Spain", without giving more detail. A second testimony states that she was in charge of a France-Portugal transit network and that she went to Algiers several times.

== Later career ==
In 1947 Corbin moved to Basel in Switzerland, where she studied with Jacques Handschin. In 1948 and 1949 she researched her doctoral thesis in Rome under the mentorship of Dom Mohlberg and Higinio Anglés, supervised by Jacques Chailley at the Sorbonne. The final evaluation of her thesis was on 24 June 1957. This was basically two theses on two different topics: La notation musicale neumatique. Les quatre provinces lyonnaises: Lyon, Rouen, Tours et Sens, and La déposition litúrgique du Christ au Vendredi Sant. Sa place dans l'histoire des rites et du théâtre religieux (analyse de documents portugais). In 1950, she was appointed professor of musical palaeography at the EPHE. In 1955, she joined the board of directors of the SFM. In 1958, she became a researcher at the CNRS. A year later she was appointed director of studies at the EPHE and, from 1961, she was also professor of musicology at the University of Poitiers until her retirement in 1970, having created the department of musicology at the university (Collegium Musicae Antiquae). She also built up the old-music collection of the current Michel Foucault library at the university. Although the bulk of her efforts were devoted to religious music, she did not neglect studies of profane or secular music in the Middle Ages.

In the last years of her life, Corbin continued to be active academically. She gave lectures in the United States (1969 and 1973), in England (1970) and in Poland (1971), held a colloquium in Italy (1972), and participated in the organization of the 1972 Musicology Studies Conference of the University of Poitiers. She also taught at the Faculté Libre International Interdisciplinaire de París. She studied the harp and performed concerts with her students on instruments designed to replicate the sounds of early instruments.

== Death ==
In April 1973, in the United States, Corbin suffered a cerebral congestion. After being operated on, she was able to return to France, where she spent the last months of her life. She died in Bourges on 17 September 1973.

In 2005, the first international conference on medieval sacred monody was organized in Portugal. It was dedicated to the memory of Corbin.
