= Robert Dussaut =

French composer

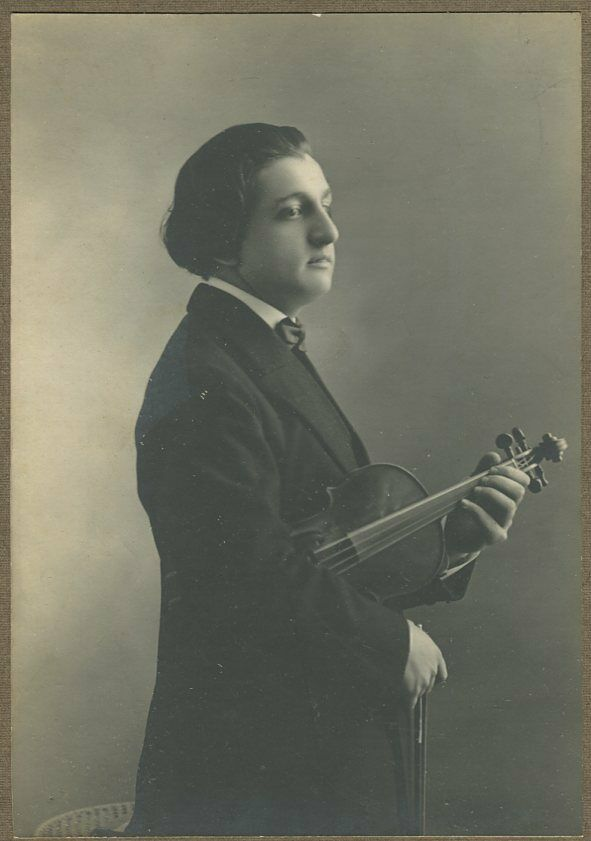
Robert Dussaut

Robert Dussaut (19 September 1896 – 23 October 1969) was a French classical composer.

== Life ==
Born in Paris from Robert Anatole Dussaut (hospital director) and Marthe Dussaut (they were first cousins), he entered the Conservatoire de Paris in 1920. Violinist by training, he won the first Grand Prix de Rome in 1924 with the cantata les Amants de Vérone.

After his stay at the Villa Médicis in Rome from 1925 to 1928, he taught at the Conservatoire de Paris from 1936.

His extensive catalogue covers several genres of music: theatrical, orchestral, chamber and vocal.

Among many works, we owe him a string quartet which was crowned by the Académie des Beaux-Arts with the 1st Grand Prix Jacques Durand. With additional instruments, this work is also in his catalogue as Symphony No.1 for strings, followed by a 2nd Choreographic Symphony; cycles of melodies including Élégie and Printemps also in violin and piano version; several lyrical dramas and particularly: La Fontaine de Pristina and Altanima, opera premiered in 1969 at the Grand Théâtre de Bordeaux.

Hélène Covatti, composer, and Robert Dussaut are pianist Thérèse Dussaut's parents.

== Selected works ==
- Altanima, lyrical drama in 3 acts from a play by Audiberti, premiered on 21 March 1969 in Bordeaux, Jean Entremont conducting, with Berthe Monmart in the title-role.
- La Fontaine de Pristina, lyrical drama in four acts, words and music by the author
- Manette Lescaut, opéra comique in 3 acts. Libretto by Michel Carré
- La conversion de Némania, 3 acts, words and music by the author.
