= Gustave Samazeuilh =

French composer and writer on music (1877–1967)

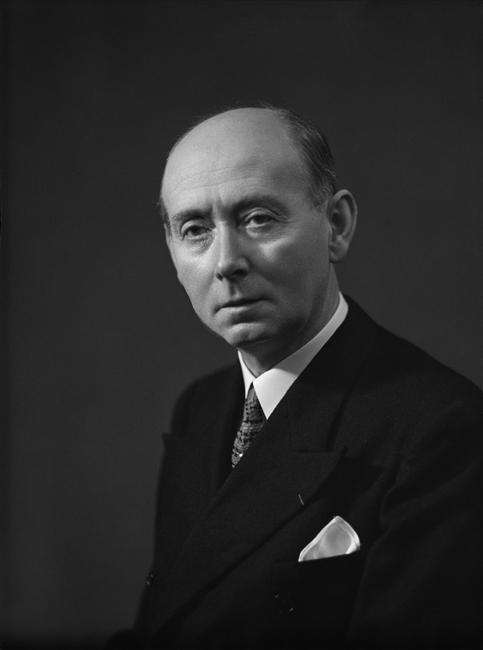
Samazeuilh in 1937

Gustave Marie Victor Fernand Samazeuilh (2 June 1877 – 4 August 1967) was a French composer and writer on music. He produced many piano transcriptions of orchestral works, and also wrote musical biography.

== Life and career ==
Gustave Samazeuilh was born on 2 June 1877 in Bordeaux, France. He was a childhood friend of Maurice Ravel, and they remained friends until 1937 when Ravel died. He studied music privately with Ernest Chausson who in 1897 introduced him to Paul Dukas. He trained with Chausson until the latter's death in 1899, and then attended the Schola Cantorum de Paris, where he was a student of Dukas and Vincent d'Indy. During his years of study he made trips to Germany in 1894, 1897, and 1898. He met Richard Strauss while attending the Bayreuth Festival.

Samazeuilh was much influenced by the impressionist school. In 1896, at the age of 19, he met Claude Debussy and became a disciple of the composer. In 1897 he studied Debussy's symphonic poem Prélude à l'après-midi d'un faune with the composer, and he became a vocal advocate and publicist for Debussy. A number of Samazeuilh's works for piano are reminiscent of Debussy. His output was marked more by "fine craftsmanship" (to quote Slonimsky) than by quantity or commercial success.

Samazeuilh published monographs on two of his teachers: Chausson and Dukas. He wrote music criticism for a variety of French-language publications, including the newspapers Le Temps, and Sud Ouest; the musical magazines La Revue musicale and Le courrier musical; and the cultural magazine Revue des deux Mondes. He also worked for Radio France.

Samazeuilh died in Paris on 4 August 1967.
