= Auguste Sérieyx =

French composer

Auguste Jean Maria Charles Sérieyx
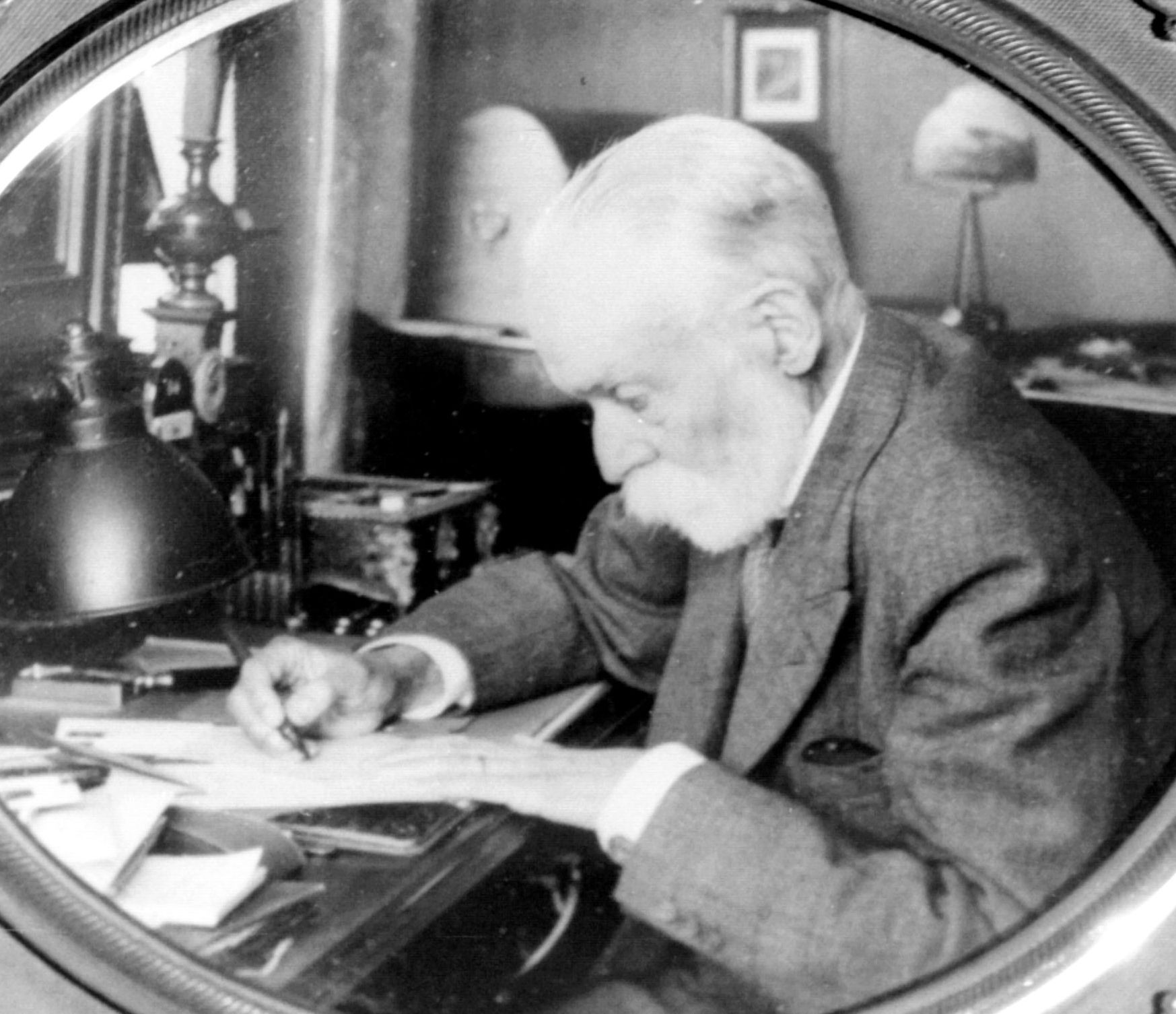
- Sérieyx at his desk in 1947
- Born: 14 June 1865; Amiens, France
- Died: 19 February 1949 (aged 83); Montreux
- Education: Conservatoire de Paris
- Occupations: Composer; Music educator

Auguste Sérieyx (14 June 1865 – 19 February 1949) was a French music pedagogue, musicologist and composer.

== Biography ==
Born in Amiens, Auguste Sérieyx, musicographer and composer studied at the Conservatoire de Paris with André Gedalge and subsequently at the Schola Cantorum de Paris with Charles Bordes, Paul Dukas and Vincent d'Indy where he latter taught music composition (1900–1914). As early as 1883, he wrote in his diary: "Music holds an increasingly important place in my preoccupations". In particular, he discovered Tchaïkovsky, Liszt and Saint-Saëns. In 1905, he married pianist Jeanne Taravant, a sought-after performer of the musicians of his time, in particular the piano music of Debussy. It was she who contributed to the introduction of Sérieyx into the Parisian musical life of the time. In the same year, Sérieyx undertook a trip to Switzerland. He visited Bulle, Montreux, the Abbey of St. Maurice, Agaunum and he attended the fête des vignerons in the company of Albert Roussel.

Installed in Montreux since 1914, Auguste Sérieyx taught at the Institut Ribaupierre. Several local musicians followed his teaching at this time, such as Carlo Boller, Aloïs Fornerod, Philippe Jules Godard and Fernand Maudon. Sérieyx also held the position of maître de chapelle at the Villeneuve church. He collaborated with Vincent d'Indy on his monumental Cours de composition. On 11 June 1920, his wife died, and he dedicated his Cours de grammaire musicale to her, which was published five years later. In 1931, on 26 July, Auguste Sérieyx married Marie-Louise Bouët. Like her husband, Marie-Louise has devoted her entire life to teaching musical language.

Very attached to the Catholic faith, Sérieyx devoted the deepest of his inspiration to religious music. He signed a collection of 24 motets on texts from The Imitation of Christ, masses, organ pieces and a mystery play for soli, choir and orchestra. Sereyx left music of piano and some pages of chamber music including a sonata for violin and piano. Author of several melodies for vocals and piano, he paid great attention to the choice of his lyrics. Among the writers and poets he put to music were Alexandre Duman, Victor Hugo, Édouard Guinand, Georges Audigier and Jean Richepin, not to mention personal translations of Latin texts. In November 1972, the Music Department of the Cantonal and University Library of Lausanne enriched its collections of music archives with the work of composer, professor and theorist Auguste Sérieyx.

Auguste Sérieyx died in Lausanne on 19 February 1949.

== Selected publications ==
- 1910: Les Trois états de la tonalité, Paris
- 1925: Cours de grammaire musical, Paris
- 1946: Monteverdi et Franck, Geneva

== Sources ==
- Auguste Sérieyx (1865-1949)
