= Jean Roger-Ducasse =

French composer

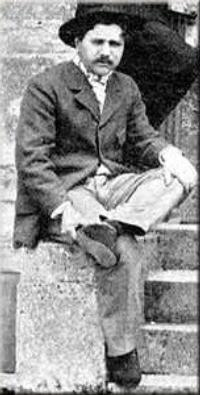
Jean Roger-Ducasse

Jean Jules Aimable Roger-Ducasse (Bordeaux, 18 April 1873 – Le Taillan-Médoc (Gironde), 19 July 1954) was a French composer.

== Biography ==
Jean Roger-Ducasse studied at the Paris Conservatoire with Émile Pessard and André Gedalge, and was the star pupil and close friend of Gabriel Fauré. He succeeded Fauré as professor of composition, and in 1935 he succeeded Paul Dukas as professor of orchestration. His personal style was firmly rooted in the French school of orchestration, in an unbroken tradition from Hector Berlioz through Camille Saint-Saëns. Among his notable pupils were Jehan Alain, Claude Arrieu, Sirvart Kalpakyan Karamanuk, Jean-Louis Martinet, and Francis George Scott.

== Compositions ==
Roger-Ducasse wrote music in nearly all classical forms, and was particularly known for his operatic stage works and orchestral compositions. These include:

- Au Jardin de Marguerite, 1901–05 Based on an episode in Goethe's Faust
- Sarabande, 1907 Symphonic poem with chorus.
- Suite française, Concerts Calonne, Paris, 1907
- Pastorale pour orgue, 1909
- Marche française, 1914
- Nocturne de printemps, 1920
- Nocturne d'hiver, 1921
- Epithalame for orchestra, 1923
- Orphée mimodrame lyrique, Opéra Garnier, 1912–13, staged in June 1926. Based on his own libretto, closely following the Greek myth. The production was mounted by Ida Rubinstein.
- Cantegril, comédie lyrique, Paris Opéra-Comique, 6 February 1931. His most ambitious work, with thirty-two demanding roles, was directed by Masson and Ricou with Roger Bourdin as Cantegril.
- Petite Suite
- Variations plaisantes sur un thème grave ("Pleasant Variations on a Serious Theme") for harp and orchestra.
- Ulysse et les sirènes ("Odysseus and the Sirens"), 1937

His piano pieces and chamber music are also noteworthy. He composed a piano quartet, a Romance for cello and piano, and two string quartets; the second, his swan song, debuted 24 May 1953, at the Château de la Brède. Piano pieces include etudes, barcarolles and arabesques.

Roger-Ducasse wrote only one work for organ, entitled Pastorale, a masterpiece that has remained popular with performers in the United States, although it is rarely played in France. Written in 1909 and published by Éditions Durand, it is a challenging virtuoso showpiece. The work has been eclipsed by more recent compositional styles. A Romance for organ and string orchestra was performed by Marie Schumacher in New York City in 1947; it's possible this is an arrangement of the piano Romance or the cello Romance.

Like Paul Dukas and Maurice Duruflé, Roger-Ducasse was severely self-critical, destroying music that did not meet his exacting standards.

== Orchestrations ==
- Rhapsodie for saxophone and orchestra (Claude Debussy), 1919
- Prométhée (Fauré), 1914–1916 (reworked)
