= François Lesure =

French musicologist and librarian (1923–2001)

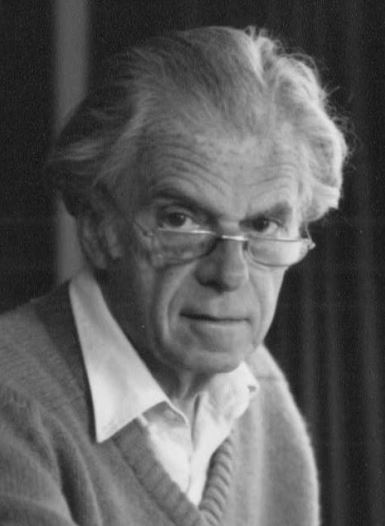
- Lesure ca. 1990
- Born: 23 May 1923; 7th arrondissement of Paris, France
- Died: 21 June 2001 (aged 78); 6th arrondissement of Paris, France
- Education: Sorbonne; École nationale des chartes; Conservatoire de Paris; École pratique des hautes études
- Occupations: Musicologist; Librarian
- Awards: Ordre des Arts et des Lettres; Chevalier de l'ordre national du Mérite; Knight of the Legion of Honour

François-Marie Lesure (23 May 1923 – 21 June 2001) was a French musicologist and librarian. He specialised in the life and œuvre of Claude Debussy, but also wrote numerous bibliographies, studies in the sociology of music and historical French topics.

Lesure was long-associated with the Bibliothèque nationale de France, where he was initially a music curator and later head of the music department.

== Biography ==
Lesure was born in the 7th arrondissement of Paris on 23 May 1923. He studied at the Sorbonne, the École nationale des chartes (graduated in 1950), the École pratique des hautes études (graduated in 1948) and the Conservatoire de Paris. In 1950, he became curator in the music department of the Bibliothèque nationale de France, which he directed from 1970 to 1988. Between 1964 and 1977, he was appointed professor of musicology at the Université libre de Bruxelles. He succeeded Solange Corbin to the chair of musicology at the École pratique des Hautes Études in 1973.

He organised major exhibitions at the Bibliothèque nationale and the Opéra de Paris. These exhibitions notably focused on Wolfgang Amadeus Mozart in 1956, Claude Debussy in 1962, Hector Berlioz in 1969 and Deux siècles d'opéra français (Two Centuries of French Opera) in 1972. At the Villa Medici in Rome, he organised Debussy et la symbolisme, an exhibit surrounding Debussy's links with the Symbolist movement.

Between 1953 and 1967 he worked at the Central Secretariat of the RISM, a global project for the identification of musical sources. He has also edited several volumes in the RISM collections. Still in the publishing field, he directed the series Le Pupitre at Heugel, devoted to early music scores, and the series Domaine musical at Les Amateurs de Livres then at Klincksieck. He was also editor of Claude Debussy's "complete works". A Festschrift was offered to him in 1988 as a gift from his friends upon his departure from the Bibliothèque Nationale, entitled Musiques, signes, images, which gathered contributions both international and from researchers or artists in various fields.

Lesure served as president of the Société française de musicologie from 1970 to 1973 and from 1987 to 1990. He is mainly acknowledged as a specialist in sixteenth-century music, music sociology, music bibliography and Debussy.

He died on 21 June 2001 in the 6th arrondissement of Paris, aged 78.

== Selected bibliography ==
=== 16th century ===
- Anthologie de la chanson parisienne au XVIe (Monaco, 1953)
- With Tillman Merritt: Clément Janequin, Chansons polyphoniques (Monaco, 1965).
- With Geneviève Thibault: Bibliographie des éditions musicales publiées par Nicolas Du Chemin (1549-1576). In Annales musicologiques 1 (1953) (pp. 269–273) + suppl.
- With Geneviève Thibault: Bibliographie des éditions d'Adrian Le Roy et Robert Ballard (1551-1598). Paris: Société française de musicologie, 1955.
- Some minor french composers of the sixteenth century, in Aspects of Medieval and Renaissance Music, ed. Jan LaRue (New York, 1966).
- Musique et musiciens français du XVIe, Geneva, Minkoff, 1976 [collections of earlier articles].
- La Facture instrumentale à Paris au seizième siècle, in The Galpin Society Journal 7 (1954), (pp. 11–52).

=== 17th and 18th centuries ===
- Les luthistes parisiens à l'époque de Louis XIII. In Le luth et sa musique, [proceedings of the symposium of Neuilly-sur-Seine, 10–14 September 1957, éd. Jean Jacquot]. Second edition revised and corrected. - Paris, 1976. (Colloques internationaux du CNRS, 511), (p. 209-223).
- Documents inédits relatifs au luthiste Gabriel Bataille (vers 1575-1630). In Revue de musicologie 29 (1947) (p. 72-88).
- Die Terpsichore von Michael Praetorius und die französische Instrumentalmusik unter Heinrich IV, in Die Musikforschung 5 (1952) (p. 7-12).
- Le Recueil de ballets de Michel Henry, in Jean Jacquot (éd.) Les Fêtes de la Renaissance (Paris, 1956, (pp. 205-211).)
- Inventaire des livres de musique de la Chapelle royale de Bruxelles en 1607. In Revue belge de Musicologie 5 (1951), (pp. 34-35).
- Histoire d'une édition posthume : les Airs de Sébastien Le Camus (1678). In Revue belge de Musicologie, 8 (1954), (pp. 126-129).
- Bibliographie des éditions musicales publiées par Estienne Roger et Michel-Charles le Cène (Amsterdam, 1696-1743). Paris, 1969.

=== Musical bibliography ===
- Dictionnaire des éditeurs de musique français, with Anik Devriès (3 volumes, 1979-1988)
- RISM B/I : Recueils imprimés XVIe–XVIIe, under the direction of F. Lesure. Munich, 1960.
- RISM B/II : Recueils imprimés XVIIIe, under the direction of F. Lesure. Munich, 1964. With a supplément in Notes Second Series 28/3 (1972), (pp. 393-418).
- [see also above the bibliographies of the publishers Le Roy et Ballard, Du Chemin et Roger].

=== About Claude Debussy ===
- Catalogue des œuvres (Geneva, 1977), with an overview of all Debussy's compositions
- Iconographie et lettres by Debussy (1980)
- Claude Debussy avant "Pelléas" ou les Années symbolistes (1993)
- Claude Debussy (1994), biography.

=== Sociology of music ===
- Dictionnaire musical des villes de province (Paris, 1999)
- Pour une sociologie historique des faits musicaux. In Report of the Eighth Congress of the International Musicological Society (New York, 1961), Kassel, 1961, (pp. 333–346)
