= Louis Aubert =

Breton composer

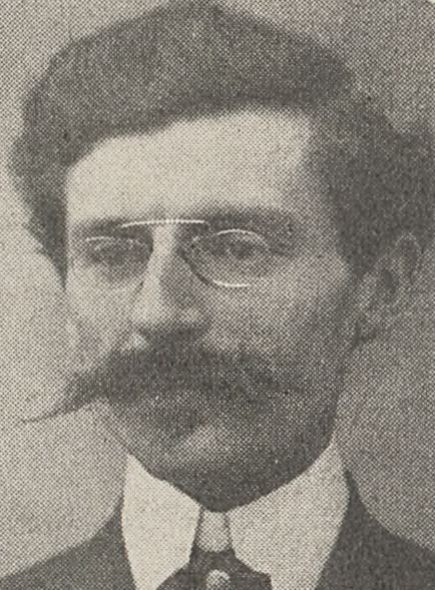
Aubert in 1909

Louis François Marie Aubert (19 February 1877 – 9 January 1968) was a French composer.

== Biography ==
Born in Paramé, Ille-et-Vilaine, Aubert was a child prodigy. His parents, recognizing their son's musical talent, sent him to Paris to receive an education at an early age. He became recognised for his voice, primarily for his renditions of the Pie Jesu from Gabriel Fauré's Requiem at the Église de la Madeleine. The young Aubert met Fauré at the Paris Conservatoire, and he regularly attended at his composition classes, which greatly influenced his development.

Aubert became an excellent pianist. In 1911, he premiered Maurice Ravel's Valses nobles et sentimentales, which were written for and dedicated to him. He also worked as a piano and composition teacher, both privately and on the faculty of the Conservatoire de Paris. He counted among his students Henry Barraud, Jean-Marie Beaudet, Jean Berger, Marinus Flipse, and Georges Savaria.

He composed music for the church, several ballets, mélodies, and incidental music for the stage. Although Breton by birth at a time of intense Breton nationalism, he was little inspired by his home region, although he was a founding member in 1912 of the Association des Compositeurs Breton. Aubert wrote popular songs, notably for Marie Dubas. He also contributed to the magazines Chantecler, Paris-soir, Le Journal and Opéra.

Aubert wrote one opera in three acts based on classic fairy tales by Charles Perrault to a libretto by J. Chenevière, entitled La fôret bleue ("The Blue Forest"). The work was composed between 1904 and 1911, and individual acts were performed while the work was in progress. The first complete staged performance took place in Geneva on 7 January 1913. The enchanting characters and delightful plot enabled the work to achieve popular success in other theaters, including Boston later the same year. The work did not appear in Paris until 1924, where it was staged at the Opéra-Comique (Salle Favart). The opera was recorded for French radio in 1954, conducted by Eugène Bigot, with Raymond Malvasio, Martha Angelici, Claudine Collart, Jacqueline Brumaire, Louis Noguéra and Lucien Lovano in the cast.

Aubert died in Paris at age 90.

== Publications ==
- L'Orchestre (Paris: PUF, 1951)
- Notice sur la vie et les travaux de Gustave Charpentier (Paris: Firmin-Didot, 1956)

== Bibliography ==
- Richard Langham Smith: "Aubert, Louis(-François-Marie)", in: Sadie, Stanley (ed.): The New Grove Dictionary of Opera, vol. 1 (London & New York: Macmillan, 1994); ISBN 0-935859-92-6.
- Louis Vuillemin: Louis Aubert et son œuvre (Paris: A. Durand, 1921)
- R. Bernard: "L. Aubert", in: La Revue musicale, VIII (1927)
- article in the monthly periodical La Bretagne à Paris (June 1956)
- Jankélévitch, Vladimir (1995), Ravel, Solfèges (nouv. ed.), Paris: Seuil, ISBN 2-02-023490-4, OCLC 33209653 LCC ML410.R23 J2 1995
- H. Corbes: "Louis Aubert, compositeur malouin", in: Bulletin de la Société d'Histoire et d'Archéologie de Saint-Malo (1981)
