= William Studwell =

American librarian (1936–2010)

William Emmett Studwell
- Born: 18 March 1936; Stamford, Connecticut
- Died: 2 August 2010 (aged 74); Bloomington Hospital
- Education: University of Connecticut, Catholic University of America
- Occupation: Librarian
- Known for: Library of Congress subject headings, Christmas Carols, and College Fight Songs
- Spouse: Ann Marie Stroia Studwell
- Children: Laura Ann

William Emmett Studwell (18 March 1936 – 2 August 2010) was an American librarian who became known for his knowledge of carols.

== Biography ==
William Studwell was born in Stamford, Connecticut and he studied history at the University of Connecticut.

== Fight songs ==
The University of Notre Dame song is one of the most recognizable collegiate fight songs in the United States. Studwell ranked the song first, and said it was "more borrowed, more famous and, frankly, you just hear it more."

== Christmas carols ==
Studwell had started to choose a carol for each year starting in 1986 when he chose the Ukrainian Carol of the Bells. Studwell took an academic interest in carols which he had spent over 6,000 hours in study. Before Christmas each year he would announce the new carol and he would be invited to interviews with the media where he was quizzed on his choice.

Studwell died in Bloomington Hospital in 2010. The day before he died he dictated a letter to his daughter which recorded his selection of a carol for 2010. Studwell fittingly chose We Wish You a Merry Christmas which is "frequently the final piece in carol performances sessions".
