= Louis Vuillemin =

French/Breton composer and music critic

Charles Louis Joseph Vuillemin (19 December 1879 – 2 April 1929) was a French composer and music critic who strongly identified with his Breton heritage in his music.

== Life ==
Vuillemin was born in Nantes, his grandfather was the piano manufacturer Louis Didion. He studied cello and composition at the conservatory of Nantes and continued at the Conservatoire de Paris, 1899–1904, with Gabriel Fauré (composition) and Xavier Leroux (harmony).

He married young; his wife Lucy was a renowned singer at the time, and he collaborated with her in writing his vocal music. In 1912, he was one of the founding members of the Paris-based Association de Compositeurs Bretons. Drafted to World War I, he was severely wounded in a gas attack which was said to have cut short his life.

As a music critic, Vuillemin wrote numerous reviews for Comœdia, Musica, Le Courrier musical, Paris-Soir, La Lanterne, etc. He also wrote biographies of Gabriel Fauré (1914), Louis Aubert (1921), and Albert Roussel (1924).

== Music ==
Vuillemin wrote in many genres including two operas, orchestral and chamber music, vocal and piano music. He attracted some attention for the Breton-influenced Soir armoricains for piano, one of many examples in which he attempted to capture the spirit of his native region. En Kernéo is another example which exists in a number of instrumentations. In these, he often used elements of Breton traditional music. An admirer of Debussy and Ravel, he set such melodies to an Impressionistic harmonic language.

== Selected compositions ==
=== Stage ===
- Le Double voile (René Fauchois), drame lyrique in 1 act (2 scenes) (1908–09)
- Cache-cache, operetta, 3 acts
- Yolaine
- Danses de Sylla, ballet (1912)

=== Orchestra ===
- Quatre Danses, Op. 16 (1924)
- Cortège d'athlètes (1924)
- Aubade (1925)
- En Kernéo (En Cornouailles) (1925)
- Épilogue (1928)
- Les Pêcheurs en goguette (1931)

=== Chamber music ===
- Deux Pièces, for cello and piano (1900)
- Pour se distraire, for piano 4-hands (1908)
- Trois Bluettes faciles, for piano 4-hands (1908)
- En Kernéo (En Cornouailles), Op. 23 (1922)

=== Piano ===
- Soirs armoricains. Études d'après nature, Op. 21 (1913–18)
- Quatre Valses légères, Op. 22 (1921)
- En Kernéo (En Cornouailles), Op. 23 (1922)
- Danse bucolique (1923)
- Trois Préludes (published 1948)

=== Vocal ===
For voice and piano, if not otherwise mentioned.

- Romance (1898)
- Adieu. Pastourelle (Jacques Patissou) (1900)
- Jane (Charles Leconte de Lisle) (1900)
- Rieuse (André d'Hormon) (1901)
- Chanson dolente (André d'Hormon) (1902)
- Chanson lasse (André d'Hormon), for voice and orchestra (1902)
- Le Portrait (Léon Dierx) (1902)
- Ma Cigale (Jean Marcel) (1902)
- Romance (Edmond Haraucourt) (1902)
- Rondels mélancoliques (Catulle Mendès) (1909)
- Les Rêves (René Fauchois) (1910)
- Les Petiots, voice and orchestra (1909)
- Nocturne (Léo Larguier), for vocal quartet, string quartet, piano (1912)
- Deux Lieds (André Hormon): 1. Présents; 2. Retour (1912)
- Crépuscule (1912)
- Pendant l'attente (1912)
- Rondels mélancoliques (1913)
- Rondel sur une joueuse de flûte (André d'Hormon) (1922)
- La Route (Henry Montassier), for voice, violin or cello, piano (1929)

== Bibliography ==
- Véfa de Bellaing (ed.): Dictionnaire des compositeurs de musique en Bretagne (Nantes: Ouest Éditions, 1992); ISBN 2-908261-11-1; p. 250–251.
- Mikael Bodlore-Penlaez & Aldo Ripoche: Musique classique bretonne / Sonerezh klasel Breizh (Spézet: Éditions Coop Breizh, 2012); ISBN 978-2-84346-563-5); p. 82–85.
