= Trois poèmes de Mallarmé =

Song cycle by Maurice Ravel

- Song cycle by Maurice Ravel
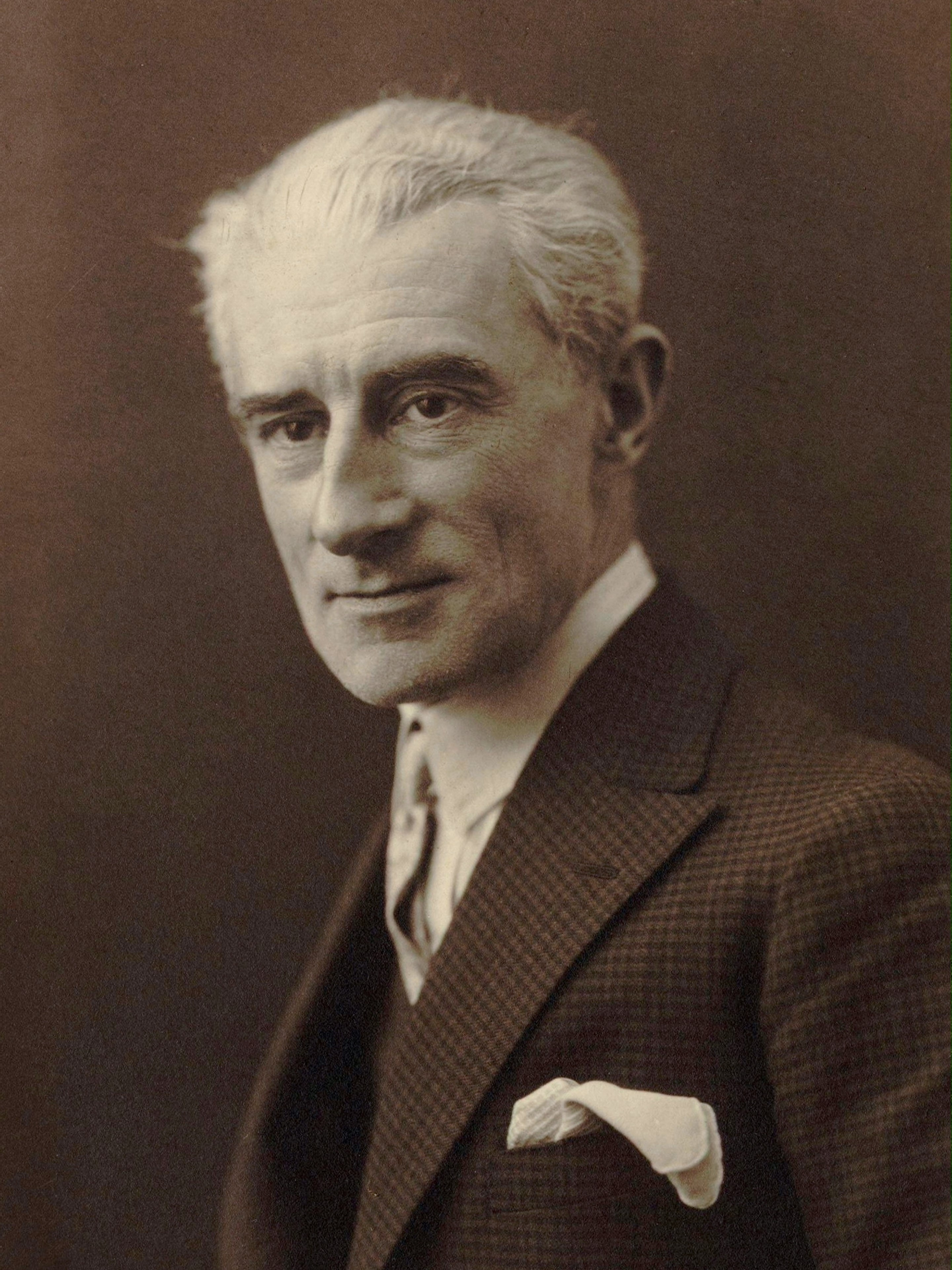
- The composer, c. 1925
- Catalogue: M. 64
- Text: poems by Stéphane Mallarmé
- Language: French
- Dedication: 1. Igor Stravinsky; 2. Florent Schmitt; 3. Erik Satie
- Performed: 14 January 1914
- Movements: three
- Scoring: soprano; 2 flutes; 2 clarinets; string quartet; piano

Trois poèmes de Mallarmé is a sequence of three art songs by Maurice Ravel, based on poems by Stéphane Mallarmé for soprano, two flutes, two clarinets, piano, and string quartet. Composed in 1913, it was premiered on 14 January 1914, performed by Rose Féart and conducted by D.-E. Inghelbrecht, at the inaugural concert of the société musicale indépendante of the 1913–1914 season in the Salle Érard in Paris.

The work bears the reference M. 64, in the catalogue of works of the composer established by musicologist Marcel Marnat.

== History ==
Maurice Ravel had a predilection for the poetry of Mallarmé. In an interview with the New York Times in the late 1920s, he said:

I consider Mallarmé not only as the greatest French poet, but also as the "only" one, since he has made the French language poetic, which was not intended for poetry. The others, including the exquisite singer Verlaine, have dealt with the rules and limits of a very precise and formal genre. Mallarmé exorcised this language, as a magician that he was. He liberated winged thoughts, unconscious daydreams, from their prison.

In 1913, the first complete edition of Mallarmé's poems was published. Ravel set three of his poems the same year, in different cities that refer to main places in his life with family and friends: Placet futile was completed in Paris, Surgi in Saint-Jean-de-Luz, where his parents lived, and Soupir in Clarens, Switzerland, where he was able to meet again with Stravinsky.

The dates of composition follow the order of execution of the three poems: the manuscript of Soupir was completed on 2 April 1913, Placet futile in May, and Surgi... in August.

== A "Debussy-Ravel" match ==
Thanks to Henri Mondor, who was one of his friends, Ravel had been able to obtain the rights for the musicalization of Mallarmé's poems. He confided him his "relief" in the face of this request, as Debussy also urged him to grant him these same rights. According to Marcel Marnat, Ravel then invited Mondor to yield to this request.

Since the Prélude à l'après-midi d'un faune, the Mercure de France used to present Debussy as "aspiring to Mallarmé's legacy". Learning that the rights had already been granted to a composer who was readily presented as his rival, he was furious.

Debussy confided how "this Mallarmé-Ravel story isn't funny." For his part, Ravel announced to Roland-Manuel: "We will soon see a Debussy-Ravel match"..."In 1913, Debussy and Ravel didn't talk to each other", concluded Stravinsky, quite interested in such "scrambles" between composers.

In general, the two great composers - apart from a certain tacit rivalry inherent in their creative contemporaneity - had always respected each other deeply, and many supposed frictions between the two personalities were above all caused by their respective surroundings, or even by the coteries occupying the Parisian musical scene.

== Introduction ==
In the eyes of the critics, the choice of poems was not fortuitous: Debussy and Ravel set Soupir and Placet futile to music. The comparison of the differences between the two versions of these poems has sometimes resulted in unfortunate consequences for the critics regarding their styles.

Debussy had chosen Éventail from the poem Autre éventail (by Miss Mallarmé) to finish his collection on an equally dreamy note, like a refined madrigal, subtly erotic. Ravel, for "the love of difficulty", chose to put in music one of the most hermetic sonnets of Mallarmé.

The "Trois Poèmes" are as follows :

1. Soupir — dedicated to Igor Stravinsky
2. Placet futile — dedicated to Florent Schmitt
3. Surgi de la croupe et du bond — dedicated to Erik Satie

The performance takes about twelve minutes.

== Premiere ==
The premiere took place on 14 January 1914, during a concert where were presented in first audition Le Petit Elfe Ferme-l'œil by Florent Schmitt for four-handed piano, the Quatre poèmes hindous by Maurice Delage and the Trois poésies de la lyrique japonaise by Igor Stravinsky. Ravel's poems ended this concert.

== Influences and coincidences ==
The instrumentation is the same as for the Trois poésies de la lyrique japonaise by Stravinsky, and close to that of the Poèmes hindous by Delage. The influence of Pierrot Lunaire by Arnold Schoenberg is often mentioned: Stravinsky and Edgar Varese had witnessed the creation of this work in Berlin in 1912. Ravel, without having heard it, had gathered their testimonies and, on their enthusiastic description, would have considered writing for a chamber music ensemble.

Paul Collaer stated that "Schoenberg pointed the way for music to escape from the enormous apparatus of the great orchestra".

However, Alexis Roland-Manuel would note that

Pierrot Lunaire was born in the fall of 1912, and the Quatre poèmes hindous were composed from January to March 1912. When Delage composed his poems, he was left to himself in the jungle, without contact with his master and friends. He spontaneously searched for and found, the first, the flash form, the total in the instantaneous, a bestowal that delivers itself in a deep sigh of tenderness.

Émile Vuillermoz would also recall that Gabriel Fauré had arranged La bonne chanson with string quartet, and that the Chanson perpétuelle, Op. 37 by Ernest Chausson (1898) was written for soprano, piano and string quartet.

== Overview of the work ==
The Trois poèmes are remarkably brief: 37 bars for Soupir, 28 bars for Placet futile and only 24 for Surgi…

Soupir opens with the "fairy-like" sonority of the natural harmonics of the string quartet, in a continuous stream of quadruple eighth notes. The voice enters quietly after this introduction. As it gently rises, the piano, then the flutes, and finally the clarinets appear. The quartet resumes after a pause, offering a natural, more elegant sound. Until the end, the voice is supported by soft sonorities on the piano, written on three staves, and discreet backings from the other instruments. The artificial harmonics of the strings return briefly in alternation with a delicate chordal arpeggio in the piano to conclude the movement.

Placet futile offers rhythm games and "dialogues" of more whimsical sonorities: the measure often changes, when Soupir remained immutably four-stroke. The piano, absent during the whole first quatrain of the poem, makes an entrance almost as "spectacular" as in the future Tzigane of 1924: a rush of arpeggios accompanying the evocation of frivolous pleasures and the "lukewarm games" of the poem. The flute offers a counter-singing to the last verses of the sonnet, which prefigures the "princess's air" of l'Enfant et les Sortilèges.

Surgi… offers as first characteristic a change in instrumentation: the second flute takes the piccolo, and the second clarinet takes the bass clarinet. The small flute immediately flies away, on a tremolo broken from the violins, pp but cruelly dissonant. Overall, the accompaniment is very discreet, with a clear and icy equality of tone (harmonics of the quartet, octaves of the piano, etc.), somewhat frightening, in accord with the words "funeral" of the poem - until the end "exhaling" in the extreme bass of the voice.

Vocally, the melody follows the text as closely as possible: neither vocals nor melisma, one note per syllable. The expansion linked to instrumental accompaniment, however, imposes a certain lyrical "breath". The performance of the song and its sharpness, or "intelligibility", are essential.

== Critic ==
It is on this point that Charles Koechlin makes a reservation about Ravel's poems, in his Traité de l'orchestration: "Avoid also words that are rare and difficult to understand at first audition".

The first tercet of Surgi de la croupe et du bond:

Le pur vase d’aucun breuvage
Que l’inexhaustible veuvage
Agonise mais ne consent

appears to be the most difficult, from this point of view. Koechlin, who was aware of this, adds in a note:

Neither Debussy nor Ravel can be blamed for having offered to Mallarmé's memory the tribute of their music, through the "three poems" that you know, I think. But you have to admit that if the listener doesn't already know by heart the humorous and delicious text of Placet futile, we don't see what he will be able to understand. As for the much more hermetically sealed Surgi de la croupe et du bond, it must first be "translated", as a difficult author, under penalty of not appreciating the beautiful musical exegesis of Maurice Ravel.

The apostrophe "Princess! ", a descendant one by Debussy, is rising by Ravel, over the same interval of a sixth. In Surgi, the vocal line presents unaccompanied tritone. In this melody, the last composition, already announces the future Ravel, that of the Chansons madécasses...

In Placet futile suddenly two equally remarkable "faces" of Ravel are set against each other. After entry of the piano (figure 3 of the score), the voice is simply expressed.

Et que sur moi je sais ton regard clos tombé

under a rare unison of the entire quartet, and major, very discreet chords (ppp) of the piano. Such is Maurice Ravel: the engineer of so many precision mechanics and passionate lyricist. Vladimir Jankélévitch finds there "a precious melody, baroque and rather Góngoresque, which curves the vocal line and imposes great variations, preventing it from shaking. The pianistic ornament, where the cold seventh major movement - the one noted next to it - stands out, is as rich as it is clear."

== Legacy ==
The Trois poèmes de Stéphane Mallarmé by Christophe Looten (1997) are written for the same instrumental ensemble as those of Maurice Ravel.

== Bibliography ==
=== Quoted works ===
- Boucourechliev, André (1998). Debussy; La révolution subtile. Les chemins de la musique (in French). Paris: Fayard. ISBN 2-213-600309. AB.

=== Monographs ===
- Jankélévitch, Vladimir (1956). Ravel. Solfèges (in French). Paris: Éditions du Seuil. ISBN 2-02-023490-4. VJ.
- Rodriguez, Philippe (2001). Maurice Delage; La solitude de l'artisan. Mélophiles (in French). Geneva: Éditions Papillon. ISBN 2-940310-08-4. PR.
