= Sept haï-kaïs =

Musical work

- Song cycle by Maurice Delage
- Text: Japanese tanka and haiku poems
- Language: French
- Composed: 1924
- Scoring: Soprano; flute; oboe; clarinet; piano; string quartet

Sept haï-kaïs (French: [sɛt aikai], (Note: In French, the masculine noun haï-kaï is pronounced with an "h" aspiré, a silent "h" which prevents normal contraction and liaison from occurring, so when the definite article le is used, it is pronounced le haï-kaï, and not l'haï-kaï.) "Seven haikais") is a song cycle of mélodies by the French composer Maurice Delage for soprano and chamber ensemble of flute, oboe, B♭ clarinet, piano, and string quartet. Delage composed the work in 1924 based on classical Japanese tanka and haiku poems he translated into French.

The work was first performed on 16 February 1925 by the mezzo-soprano Jane Bathori at a concert conducted by Darius Milhaud at the Société musicale indépendante (SMI). The SMI was a concert society founded in 1909 by Maurice Ravel and others friends of Delage's to free themselves of the restrictions of the program music of the Société Nationale de Musique (SNM).

Sept haï-kaïs is shorter and more complex than Delage's Quatre poèmes hindous ("Four Hindu Poems", 1914), and less known than Stravinsky's Trois poésies de la lyrique japonaise ("Three Japanese Lyrics", 1913), whose lyrics were also translated by Delage. Sept haï-kaïs bridges the music of Japan and modern French music, and is considered the masterwork of Delage's mature period.

== Background ==
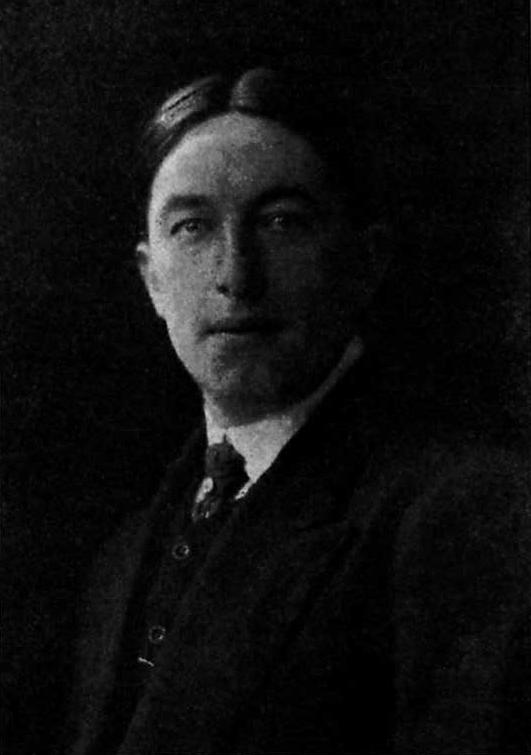
Maurice Delage, 1912

Like many Western artists at the beginning of the 20th century, Maurice Delage (1879–1961) displayed a pronounced taste for the arts of Japan (Japonism). The young composer, benefiting from his father's financial aid, undertook a voyage to India and Japan at the end of 1911, where he stayed for 1912. He related hardly any of his memories of the time except to his closest friends. In his biography of Delage, Philippe Rodriguez laments the composer had "never said nor written anything about his trip to Japan; at least, nothing that remains". (Note: "jamais rien dit ni écrit en particulier sur le séjour qu'il fit au Japon : du moins rien ne subsiste")

Amongst Delage's most favoured friends, the Russian composer Igor Stravinsky soon took to the same enthusiasm for Japanese culture, putting the composition of The Rite of Spring (1913) tentatively aside to set the Trois poésies de la lyrique japonaise ("Three Japanese Lyrics") to music, which Delage had translated for him. Stravinsky dedicated the first poem, "Akahito", to Delage, and Delage dedicated the last of his Quatre poèmes hindous, "Jeypur", to Stravinsky.

The interest in Japanese classical music (gagaku) led Delage to organize a concert when in 1925 the shamisen virtuoso Sakichi Kineya IV visited Paris. Jirohachi Satsuma, a wealthy patron of the arts, recalled: "Ravel and Delage thought to organize a welcoming party in honour of Sakichi and his wife, at the home of the pianist Henri Gil-Marchex. Sakichi played, dressed in a red coat, before a gold screen. Ravel and Delage were captivated by this concert." (Note: "l'avis de Ravel et de Delage [était] d'organiser une réception de bienvenue en l'honneur de Sakichi et sa femme, au domicile du pianiste [Henri] Gil-Marchex. Sakichi joua, revêtu d'un manteau rouge, devant un paravent doré. Ravel et Delage furent captivés par ce concert")

== Outline ==
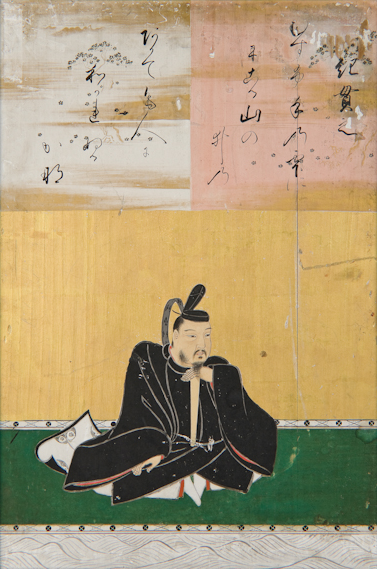
Ki no Tsurayuki, author of the first preface to the Kokin Wakashū—17th-century portrait by Kanō Tan'yū

The seven mélodies form a sequence. At a concert in Geneva in April 1929, Delage took care to specify: "the author requests these seven short pieces not be interrupted; the tonal sequence is intentional". (Note: "L'auteur prie de ne pas interrompre ces sept courts morceaux : l'enchaînement tonal a été prévu")

=== Poems ===
Haï-kaï is a French rendering of the Japanese word haikai (俳諧, "comic, unorthodox") referring to a genre of Japanese poetry generally tinged with humour. It evolved in the 16th century from the tanka, a poetic form of 31 syllables in five lines in a scheme of 5-7-5-7-7 syllables. The tanka appeared in the Imperial Court at the end of the Nara period in the late 8th century and enjoyed a golden age during the Heian period (794–1185). The haiku form that had appeared by the 17th century also derives from the tanka, reduced to 17 syllables: 5-7-5.

Gaston Renondeau noted that the haikai form "enjoyed an unparallelled vogue from the end of the 15th century". (Note: "connut une vogue sans pareille, à partir de la fin du XVe siècle") The production of haikai has continued into modern times. The "light" character of the work does not preclude depth—according to Rodriguez, "the limited number of words condenses the energy of the poem, a veritable animistic vision of nature", (Note: "le nombre limité de mots concentre l'énergie du poème, véritable vision animiste de la nature") and thus "the first lines are loaded with a symbolism suitable to draw Delage's attention, and constitute the first of the Sept haï-kaïs". (Note: "les premières lignes sont chargées de toute une symbolique, propre à retenir l'attention de Delage, et constituent le premier des Sept haï-kaïs")

I. Préface du Kokinshū (tanka by Ki no Tsurayuki; dedicated to Mrs Louis Laloy)

French	Japanese	Romanized Japanese	English
Si tu écoutes la chanson du rossignol dans les fleurs ou du crapaud dans l'eau, tu sauras que nul être ne peut vivre sans un jour chanter.	花に鳴く鶯 水に住む蛙の声を聞けば 生きとし生けるもの いづれか 歌を詠まざりける	Hana ni naku uguisu mizu ni sumu kawazu no koe o kikeba iki to shi ikeru mono izure ka uta o yomazarikeru	Hearing the warbler sing among the blossoms and the frog in his fresh waters— is there any living being not given to song?

II. "Les herbes de l'oubli ..." (by Sosei; dedicated to Andrée Vaurabourg, the future wife of Arthur Honegger)

French	Japanese	Romanized Japanese	English
Les herbes de l'oubli, je me demandais d'où venaient leurs graines. Je sais maintenant qu'elles naissent au cœur sans pitié de mon amie.	忘れ草 何をか種と 思ひしは つれなき人の 心なりけり	Wasure-gusa Nani o ka tane to Omoishi wa Tsurenaki hito no Kokoro narikeri	What could be the seed Of those forgetting grasses, I once did wonder; Now I know it is the heart Of one indifferent to love.

III. "Le coq ..." (by Georges Sabiron; dedicated to Jane Bathori, the performer of the work)

French	English
Flaque d'eau sans un pli — le coq qui boit et son image se prennent par le bec.	Puddle without a ripple. The drinking rooster and its image Catch each other's beaks.

IV. "La petite tortue ..." (by Hiroko Katayama; dedicated to Mrs Fernand Dreyfus, mother of Alexis Roland-Manuel)

French	Japanese	Romanized Japanese	English (Note: This is a Wikipedia translation of the French version; the French is a free translation of the original Japanese)
La petite tortue rampe — lentement, lentement — et j'en ai peine, sans penser que moi-même j'avance tout comme elle !	龜の子は のそりのそりと はうて行く 氣味わるけれど 我も行くかな	Kame no ko wa nosori nosori to haute iku kimi waru keredo ware mo iku kana	The little turtle crawls — slowly, slowly — and I find it hard not to think that I myself move on just like her!

V. "La lune d'automne ..." (by Akiko Yosano; dedicated to Suzanne Roland-Manuel, the wife of Roland-Manuel)

French	Japanese	Romanized Japanese	English
De la blanche étoffe des vagues écumant sur la mer déchaînée, la lune d'automne sort comme d'une robe.	龜の子は のそりのそりと はうて行く 氣味わるけれど 我も行くかな	Shiranami no Nuno ni sugarite Araiso no Aki no hajime no Tsuki noborikinu	Above the wild shore the first moon of Autumn rose, clinging to a robe of white waves.

VI. "Alors ..." (by Uejima Onitsura, translated by Paul-Louis Couchoud; dedicated to Denise Jobert (daughter of the publisher))

French	Japanese	Romanized Japanese	English
Elles s'épanouissent — alors on les regarde — alors les fleurs se flétrissent — alors...	咲くからに 見るからに 花の散るからに	Saku kara ni Miru kara ni Hana no chiru kara ni	because they bloom because we view them because they fall —

VII. "L'été ..." (author unknown; dedicated to Georgette Garban) (Note: Some sources say the poem is by Matsuo Bashō, but the original has not been identified)

L'été dans la montagne —

le crépuscule sur les cèdres —

on entend la cloche d'une lieue ...

=== Translations ===
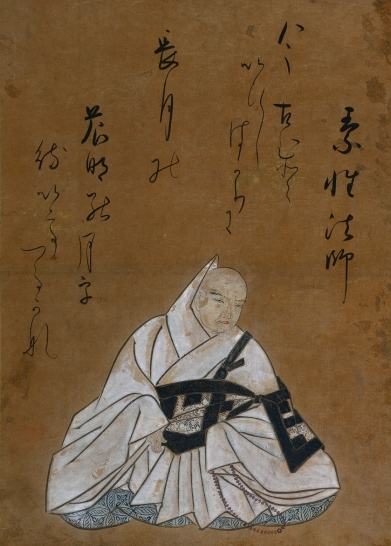
The monk Sosei, author of the second haikai—imaginary portrait by Shōkadō Shōjō, 17th century, Cleveland Museum of Art

Delage had learned Japanese in preparation for his journey to Japan in 1912. He gained a sufficient mastery of the subtletites of the poetic language to translate himself the poems that he put to music, as he had done for Stravinsky's Trois poésies de la lyrique japonaise in 1913. He took poems for Sept haï-kaïs from the Kokin Wakashū and other anthologies of poetry, but neglected to specify their authors.

Delage's translations, inspired by those of the Japanologist Paul-Louis Couchoud, were also very personal, according to the musicologist Michaël Andrieu. The composer sometimes organizes the verses to better fit the music. For example, the Anthologie de la poésie japonaise classique published by Gaston Renondeau gives the following translation of the second haikai, by Sosei (c. 844–910):

Je me demandais

ce qui pourrait servir de graine

à l'« herbe d'oubli » ?

Et voici que c'était le cœur

d'une personne cruelle.

The expression herbe d'oubli ("forgetting grass") is a word-for-word translation of the Japanese wasure-gusa (忘れ草), the daylily Hemerocallis fulva. The Chinese believed it caused people to forget their unhappiness. Classical Japanese poets readily used such double meanings.

=== Music ===
The mélodies are very short; in the piano edition, each takes up two pages, except the first, for which the instrumental prélude takes up a full page. The fourth mélodie, "La petite tortue ...", is only seventeen measures long—the number of syllables in a Japanese haiku. Alexis Roland-Manuel remarked on this mélodie: "Do not let your modesty make you forget a certain fable by La Fontaine. You hurry slowly, perhaps, but none of your steps are wasted. How many hares envy you!"

The harmony is pricked with fine, expressive dissonances. For the third mélodie, "Le coq ...", the instruments "peck" the melody with appoggiaturas in a spirit similar to that in Ravel's Histoires naturelles (1906). According to Andrieu, "Maurice Delage's composition is simple and refined; the composer stays ever attentive to timbral balance to create atmosphere". (Note: "l'écriture de Maurice Delage est simple et raffinée, le compositeur restant toujours attentif aux équilibres entre les timbres pour créer des atmosphères")

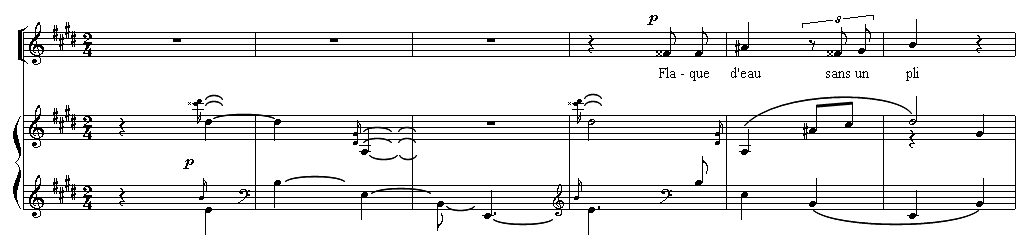
The opening measures of "Le coq ..."

The pieces display contrasts in sonority and tempo: the Préface—"vif" and "quasi una cadenza"—comes together on an andantino assuming a rich adornment evoking the sustained "voice of the nightingales in the flowers". (Note: "la voix du rossignol dans les fleurs") "Les herbes de l'oubli ..." follows the course of a larghetto phrase. The tempo of "Le coq" is moderato, with a little more animation towards the end. "La petite tortue ..." proceeds naturally on a lento rhythm. "La lune d'automne ..." rises on an agitato wave. "Alors ..." returns to the larghetto of the second mélodie, and "L'été ..." unfolds calm. The end is freely slow, dim. e morendo, with the freedom to let the instruments resonate as deeply as possible. Rodriguez compared the succession of poems to stages in a "veritable interior voyage". (Note: "véritable voyage intérieur")

Comparing the two versions of the work—for voice and piano or instrumental ensemble—musicologist Marius Flothuis considered that "the orchestral version doubtlessly respects the composer's idea more". (Note: "la version orchestrale respecte sans doute davantage l'idée du compositeur") The version with piano is more difficult to execute—for example in the Préface in particular:

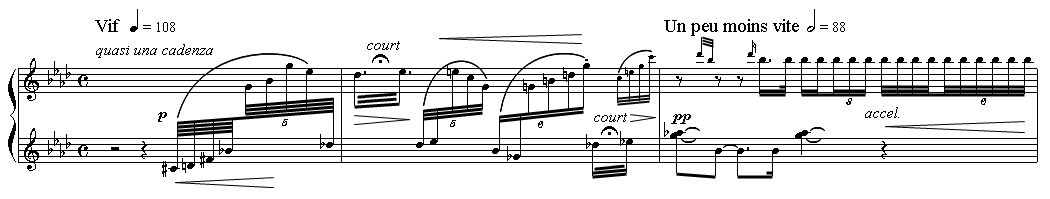
Opening measures of the Préface

A characteristic modulation, quoted in Delage's In morte di un samouraï of 1950, caught Flothuis's attention. At the beginning of "L'été ..." the first two chords have a double false relation (of C♭ to B♭, and G♭ to G♮) followed by an insistent fourth in the bass, which Flothuis interprets as "a double pedal point (B♭ + E♭)". (Note: "une double pédale (si♭ + mi♭)") This evokes the distant beating of the temple bell and is heard twelve times in just nine measures, always off-beat of the melody:

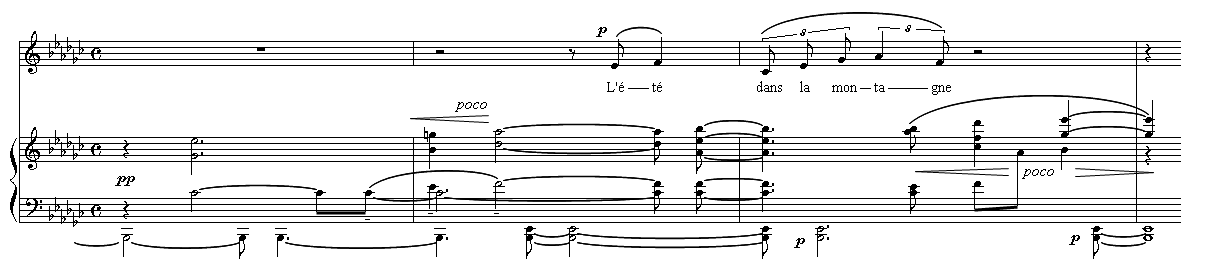
Opening measures of "L'été ..."

=== Instrumentation ===
Two versions of Sept haï-kaïs were published, and are equally often performed in concert: the first in 1924 for voice and ensemble, and the second in 1926 for voice and piano. The composer had Tsuguharu Foujita produce an illustration for the cover to this version of the score.

The musical accompaniment is very refined. Jean-Paul Bartoli considered the instrumentation "rarefied and unusual". (Note: "raréfiée et insolite") Except for serial techniques, all the qualities of the essentially melodic work are found in those of Anton Webern, a composer whom Delage did not know of.

The writing is more demanding than Quatre poèmes hindous (1912), to the same extent that Ravel's Chansons madécasses (1926) went further than his Trois poèmes de Mallarmé (1913). The four works are rigorously modern and, according to Bartoli, "these short, fine miniatures, perhaps inspired by the Stravinsky's cycle, no doubt stimulated Ravel to compose his Chansons madécasses". (Note: "ces brèves et fines miniatures, peut-être inspirées par le cycle de Stravinsky, ont sans doute stimulé Ravel pour la composition de ses Chansons madécasses")

The following table reflects this common trend towards a lighter instrumentation:

Comparison of instrumentation in works by Delage and Ravel
Works by Maurice Delage		Works by Maurice Ravel
Quatre poèmes hindous	Sept haï-kaïs	Trois poèmes de Mallarmé	Chansons madécasses
flute	flute	flute	flute
piccolo		2nd flute (also piccolo)
oboe also taking the cor anglais	oboe
clarinet	clarinet	clarinet
bass clarinet		2nd clarinet (also bass clarinet)
harp	piano	piano	piano
1st violin	1st violin	1st violin
2nd violin	2nd violin	2nd violin
viola	viola	viola
cello	cello	cello	cello

== Performances ==
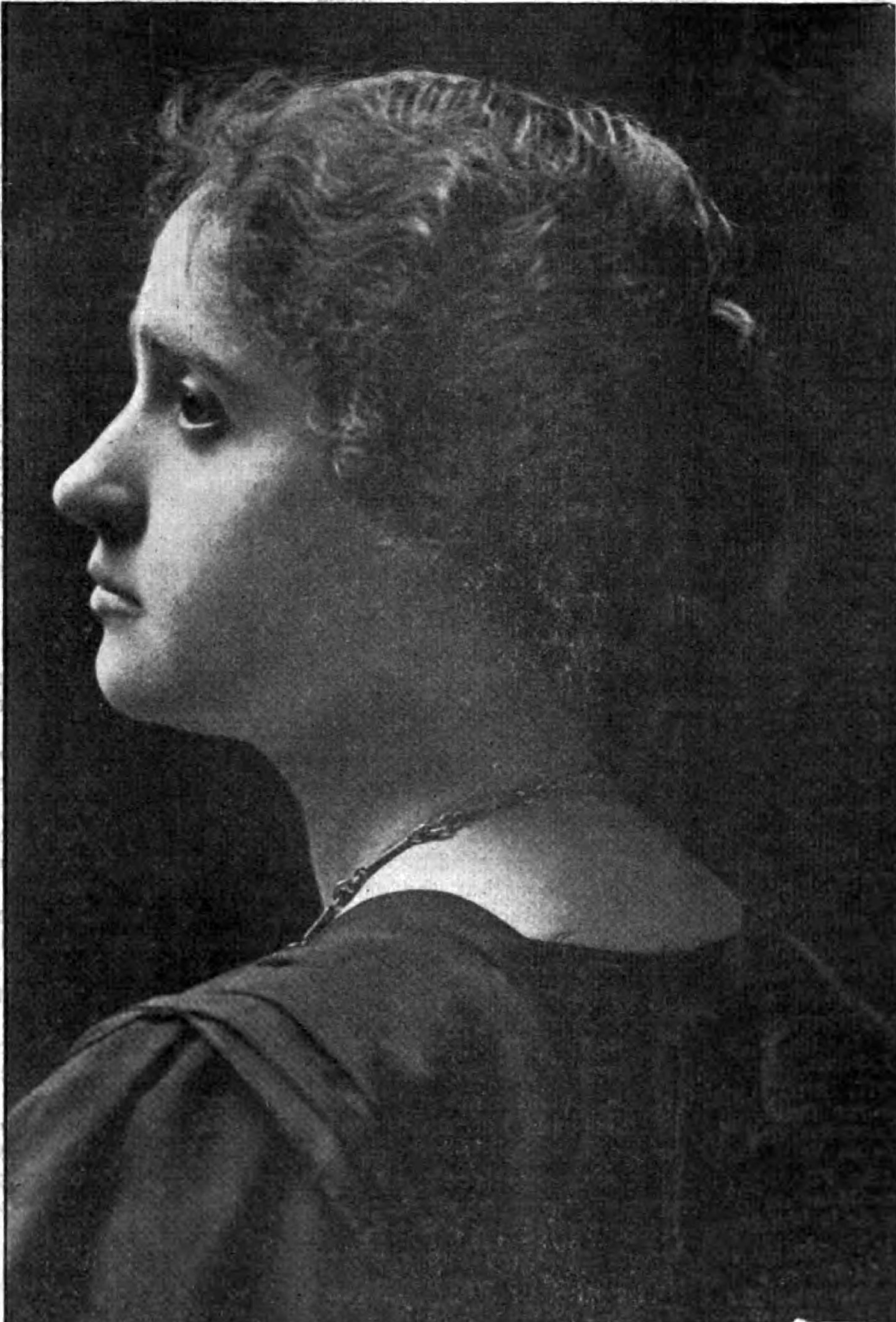
Jane Bathori sang the première of Sept haï-kaïs in 1925. (photo from 1912)

The première took place 16 February 1925 at a concert of the Société musicale indépendante (SMI) at the Salle Érard in Paris. The mélodies were performed by Jane Bathori and conducted by Darius Milhaud. Delage had gotten Bathori to agree to perform it late in the year before. In a letter to her dated 27 September 1924, he wrote: "My publisher had to send you my seven little things in the hope they would interest you. ... They are a bit basic for your great virtuosity, but that could tempt you to do something good with them". (Note: "Mon éditeur a dû vous faire parvenir mes sept petits machins, dans l'espoir que vous voudrez bien vous y intéresser. ... C'est bien un peu simplet pour votre grande virtuosité, mais ça peut vous tenter d'en faire quelque chose de bien)

Despite the lukewarm reception at its première, the Sept haï-kaïs were performed in concert several times with growing success. In April 1929, the organizers of the 7th festival of the International Society for Contemporary Music presented the work in Geneva, performed by Madeleine Grey and conducted by Ernest Ansermet. Following the concert, Aloys Mooser praised the Sept haï-kaïs as "chiselled with a subtle, refined artistry. In a few lines, these little pieces create a singularly expressive atmosphere". (Note: "ciselés avec un art subtil et raffiné. En quelques traits, ces petites pièces créent une atmosphère singulièrement expressive")

More than two decades after their composer's death in 1961, Sept haï-kaïs had its first performance in Japan on 20 July 1985 at Sōgetsu Hall during the Tokyo Summer Festival, along with works by Ravel, Stravinsky, and Shostakovich.

== Reception ==
The Sept haï-kaïs received limited success—music critics were for the most part taken aback by the brevity of the mélodies. Gustave Samazeuilh mentioned only "the very brief but very musical Japanese songs". (Note: "les très brefs mais très musicaux chants japonais") In an article for le Ménestrel, Paul Bertrand summed up the general public sentiment, seeing in the vocal cycle "a succession of sketches, often charming but very brief, so brief that no impression of any of them had the time to affirm itself". (Note: "une succession d'esquisses souvent charmantes mais extrêmement brèves, si brèves qu'aucune impression n'a le temps de s'affirmer pour chacune d'elles ...")

Amongst the first critics asked to evaluate the work, Alexis Roland-Manuel showed greater understanding. He acknowledged the attentive effort required of the listener was a small thing in light of the merits of the score: "It is known that the Japanese craftsman is the stingiest of his talent in the world. He does not break the silence except at long intervals and speaks but few words to us each time. But each of these words is full of meaning; but from each of their syllables the doors of the dream swing away for us." (Note: "On sait que cet artisan japonais est l'homme du monde le plus avare de son talent. Il ne rompt le silence qu'à de longs intervalles et ne nous dit chaque fois que peu de mots. Mais chacun de ces mots est lourd de sens; mais chacune de ses syllabes écarte pour nous les battants des portes du songe")

For his friends, it was evidence that the composer of Quatre poèmes hindous had devoted himself to the most concise poetry possible. Music critics had also to some extent reported on this trend toward increased refinement. From 1923, Paul Bertrand severely criticized Delage's mélodies: "M. Delage shows a slightly excessive discretion ... If, haunted by the spirit of Wagner, too many composers have tended to impose pretentious works of indigestible extent on their listeners, many others today narrow down their music too willingly by reducing it to the conception of a little picture, and even of a tiny mantlepiece trinket." (Note: "M. Delage fait preuve d'une discrétion un peu excessive ... Si, hantés par le génie de Wagner, trop de compositeurs eurent tendance à imposer à leurs auditeurs des œuvres prétentieuses, d'une ampleur indigeste, beaucoup d'autres, aujourd'hui, étriquent trop volontiers la musique en la ramenant à la conception du tableautin, et même du minuscule objet d'étagère")

An anonymous review in the Revue musicale in 1926 presented the work thus: "The string quartet, the flute, the clarinet, the oboe, aided by the piano, come together here for the most fantastic alchemy, a prodigy of sounds in which the magician Delage goes further in the fine poetry of timbres than any other enchanter. It is a very tiny, precious drop that he shows us: the music is reduced to the secret of its essence. But in a sunny drop of water is also where the rainbow is found. (Note: "le quatuor à cordes, la flûte, la clarinette, le hautbois, aidés du piano, s'unissent ici pour la plus fantastique alchimie, un prodige de sonorités où le magicien Delage va plus loin dans la fine poésie des timbres que nul autre enchanteur. C'est une goutte précieuse et toute menue qu'il nous montre : la musique est réduite au plus secret de sa quintessence. Mais, dans une goutte d'eau ensoleillée, l'on trouve aussi l'arc-en-ciel")

Following the Sept haï-kaïs, each of Delage's new works performed in concert were subject to similar critical attacks—according to Rodriguez, by "music critics, historiographers, people in Parisian salons who, all his life, ridiculed his "preciousness", his "trinkets", his breathlessness, all told, his timid artistic insufficiencies". (Note: "critiques musicaux, historiographes et gens de salons parisiens qui, tout au long de sa vie, brocardèrent sa « préciosité », ses « bibeloteries », son manque de souffle et, pour tout dire, ses insuffisances d'artiste timoré") These criticisms, reducing Delage's music to only the Haï-kaïs, led to supportive responses from musicians and composers sensitive to their musical qualities. At the première in 1951 of Delage's In morte di un samouraï, a work made up of six original haikais, René Dumesnil hailed the work: "Maurice Delage is a master; one asks only for a little justice for him." (Note: "Maurice Delage est un maître, on ne demande pour lui qu'un peu de justice")

At a performance in 1957 conducted by Tony Aubin, the musicographer René Dumesnil commented: "the economy of means does not embarrass Delage more than the scale, and whatever the number of performers, it has the same sureness. Nothing unnecessary, but all that can best translate thought, feeling, or subtle impression to create in the mind of the listener the echo of an idea that music alone is capable of awakening—when written by a magician like him." (Note: "l'économie de moyens n'embarrasse pas plus Delage que l'ampleur, et c'est, quel que soit l'effectif des exécutants, une même sûreté. Rien d'inutile, mais tout ce qui peut le mieux traduire pensée, sentiment ou impression subtils, faire naître dans l'esprit de l'auditeur l'écho d'une idée que la musique seule est capable d'éveiller — quand elle est écrite par un magicien comme lui")

In 1959, On the occasion of Delage's 80th birthday, Paul Le Flem declaimed "the artistic perfection that always gives way before the Apollonian pleasure of music: music and poetry, that which is not for surprising us. What puzzles some, which seems grossly unfair to me, is the conspiracy of silence that slowly weaves around this musician who knows the value of silence, shade, solitude." (Note: "la perfection artisanale qui s'efface toujours devant le plaisir apollinien de la musique : la musique et la poésie, voilà qui n'est pas pour nous surprendre. Ce qui déconcerte un peu, ce qui prend l'allure, à mes yeux, d'une injustice criante, c'est la conspiration du silence qui s'est lentement tissée autour de ce musicien qui connaît la valeur du silence, de l'ombre, de la solitude")

Roland-Manuel, in the first article devoted to Delage, defined "the singular situation" of the composer of the Sept haï-kaïs—according to Rodriguez, "with a rare clairvoyance"—"When one penetrates the intimacy of the work, one is struck by the abundance of riches contained in tight box. One discovers the clever subtlety of a craftsman who softens the rebellious material and disciplines the forms in the manner of a sculptor of Japanese ivory." (Note: "Quand on pénètre dans l'intimité de l'œuvre, on est frappé par l'abondance des richesses qu'elle renferme dans un cadre exigu. On découvre l'astucieuse subtilité d'un artisan qui assouplit la matière rebelle et discipline les formes à la façon d'un sculpteur d'ivoire japonais")

Rodriguez places the Sept haï-kaïs amongst the most advanced works of their era: "At the time when Falla wrote his ascetic El retablo de maese Pedro, when Schönberg signed his Five Piano Pieces opus 23, when Roussel also turned towards the Orient with Padmâvatî, the Haï-kaïs fit into this universe like seven brilliant stars in an amethyst sky", (Note: "Au moment où Falla écrit son ascétique Retable de Maître Pierre, où Schönberg signe ses cinq pièces opus 23, où Roussel se tourne lui aussi vers l'Orient avec Padmâvatî, les Haï-kaïs s'inscrivent dans cet univers comme sept étoiles brillantes dans un ciel d'améthyste") and "well up from the depths of being, like an inner necessity". (Note: "sourdent du plus profond de l'être, comme une nécessité intérieure")

To the musicologist Jean Gallois, the Sept haï-kaïs are "indisputedly, inarguably a masterwork: these few pages remain amongst the musician's most celebrated", (Note: "un chef-d'œuvre indiscutable, indiscuté : ces quelques pages demeurent parmi les plus célèbres du musicien") and Delage has become "the musician of the haikais". (Note: "le musicien des haï-kaïs") Andrieu tempered this judgement, saying the composer "does not often receive recognition except by an elite". (Note: "n'est bien souvent reconnu que par une élite")

== Editions ==
- Maurice Delage, Sept haï-kaïs, éditions Jobert, Paris (1924, for the ensemble version)
- Maurice Delage, Sept haï-kaïs, éditions Jobert, Paris (1926, for the piano and vocal version)

== Discography ==
- Sept haï-kaïs (1995) Darynn Zimmer (soprano), Solisti New York, conducted by Ramson Wilson, CD New Albion Records NA 078
- Sept haï-kaïs (1995) Felicity Lott (soprano), Kammer Ensemble de Paris conducted by Armin Jordan, Aria Music 592300
- Maurice Delage: Les Mélodies (1998) Sandrine Piau (soprano), Jean-Paul Fouchécourt (tenor), Jean-François Gardeil (baritone), Billy Eidi (piano), CD Timpani 1C1045
- Maurice Delage: Musique de chambre (1998) Lucienne van Deyck (mezzo-soprano), instrumental ensemble conducted by Robert Groslot, CD Cyprès CYP2621
