= Quatre poèmes hindous =

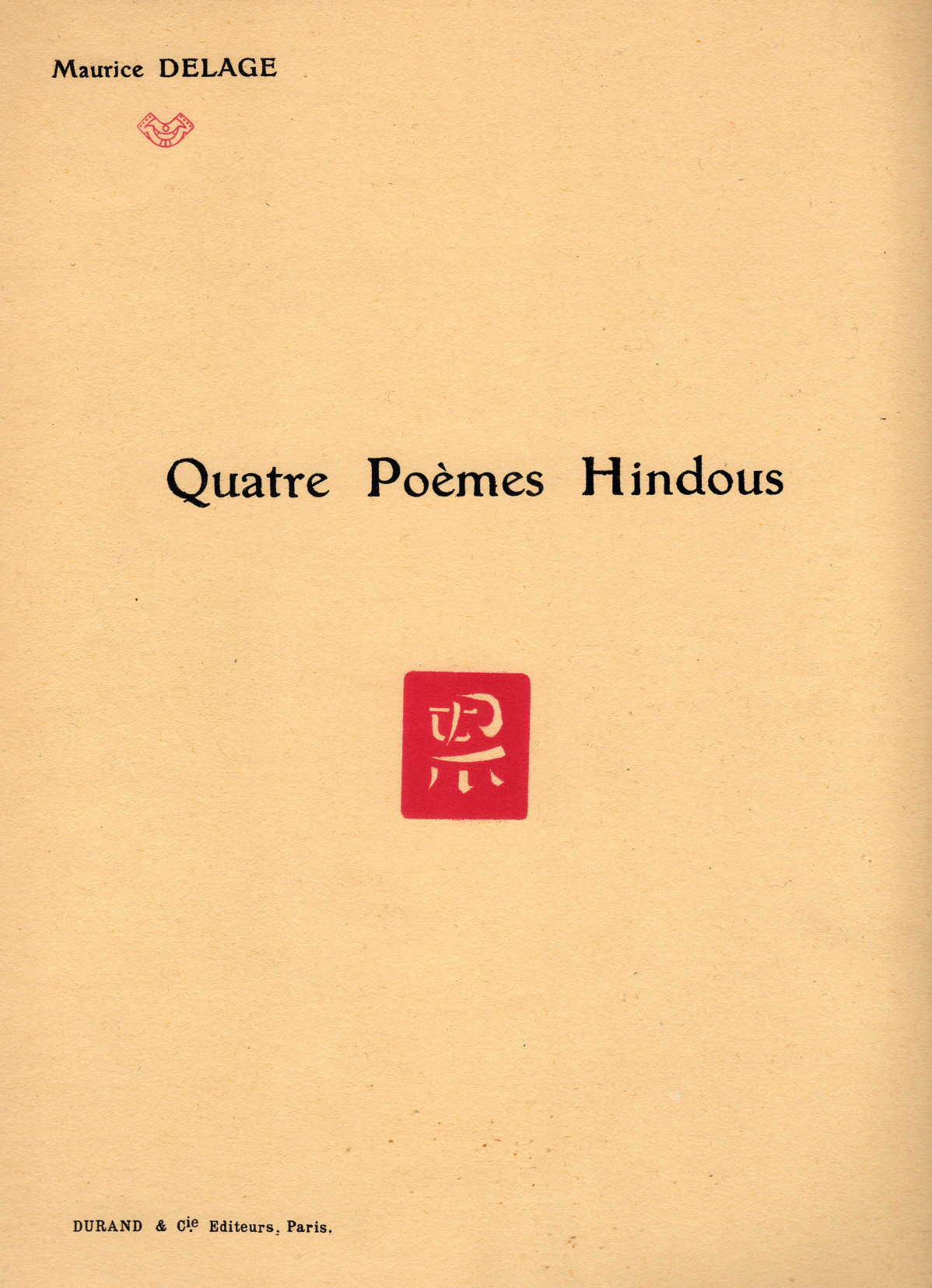
Cover to the original 1914 edition of Quatre poèmes hindous

The Quatre poèmes hindous ("Four Hindu poems") are a cycle of mélodies by the French composer Maurice Delage for soprano and chamber ensemble of two flutes, oboe, two clarinets, harp, and string quartet. Delage composed it in 1912 while he was visiting India. It is considered his first masterwork, and it remains the best known and most recorded of his works.

== Structure ==
=== Titles and dedications ===
1. Madras – "Une belle ..." (stanza 22 by Bhartṛhari), dedicated to Maurice Ravel
2. Lahore – "Un sapin isolé ..." (poem by Heine)
3. Bénarès – Naissance de Bouddha (anonymous), dédié à Florent Schmitt
4. Jeypur – "Si vous pensez à elle ..." (stanza 73 by Bhartṛhari), dedicated to Igor Stravinsky.

The performance lasts just under nine minutes.

=== Composition ===
At the end of the French Third Republic, the Far East was in fashion in France, particularly in certain artistic circles. The French composer Maurice Delage (1879–1961) travelled to British India at the end of 1911, largely funded by his father, (Note: Joseph Delage, the composer's father, owned the "Cirage du Lion noir" et "Crème du Lion noir" brands of shoe polish, the source of the family's fortune.) who accompanied him. The visit lasted until May 1913. Delage named the mélodies he composed after the cities he was visiting when he composed them: Jaipur ("Jeypur"), Varanasi ("Bénarès"), Lahore, and Chennai ("Madras").

According to Philippe Rodriguez, the trip allowed the young composer to "reduce as much as possible an inferiority complex" (Note: (in French) "réduire autant que possible un complexe d'infériorité") he suffered from, despite encouragement from Maurice Ravel, thanks to "the authenticity of an exoticism drawn from the source". (Note: (in French) "l'authenticité d'un exotisme puisée à la source") Rodriguez states the Quatre poèmes hindous represent "one of the first attempts to introduce the melodic and rhythmic forms of Indian music to the language of Western music". (Note: (in French) "une des toutes premières tentatives visant à introduire les formes mélodiques et rythmiques de la musique de l'Inde dans le langage de la musique occidentale")

Delage likely had a piano, as he felt himself unable to compose without a keyboard He first made a version for soprano and piano and then magnified it with a rich harmonic instrumentation. The technique of the instruments, all solo, is so exact that the harmonic instrumentation seems to have been specified very early. The dates of composition are in the reverse order of the sequence of the mélodies: "Si vous pensez à elle ..." and Naissance de Bouddha were completed in January 1912, "Un sapin isolé ..." in February, and "Une belle ..." in March.

=== Instrumentation ===
The instrumental formation is reduced effectively to chamber music, in which the piano is excluded. Michel Duchesneau sees in this the influence of Schönberg's Pierrot Lunaire, which premièred in Vienna on 16 December 1912 and which motivated Ravel and Stravinsky to compose their own poems during 1913. The work of Schönberg was also to have been included in the 1914 concert programme. Alexis Roland-Manuel refuted this influence on Delage, while Marius Flothuis sees the instrumental ensemble as closer to that which Ravel used in 1905 for his Introduction and Allegro, which is left to flute, clarinet, harp, and string quartet.

Maurice Delage	Arnold Schönberg	Maurice Ravel	Igor Stravinsky
Quatre poèmes hindous	Pierrot Lunaire	Trois poèmes de Mallarmé	Trois poésies de la lyrique japonaise
flute	flute (also piccolo)	flute	flute
piccolo		2nd flute (also piccolo)	2nd flute
oboe (aussi cor anglais)			
clarinet	clarinet (also bass clarinet)	clarinet	clarinet
bass clarinet		2nd clarinet (also bass clarinet)	2nd clarinet
harp	piano	piano	piano
1st violin	violin (also viola)	1st violin	1st violin
2nd violin		2nd violin	2nd violin
viola		viola	viola
cello	cello	cello	cello

== Première ==
The première took place on 14 January 1914 at the inaugural concert of the Société musicale indépendante (SMI). It was performed by Rose Féart and was conducted by Désiré-Émile Inghelbrecht. The premières of Florent Schmitt's Le Petit Elfe Ferme-l'œil, Ravel's Trois poèmes de Mallarmé, and Stravinsky's Three Japanese Lyrics took place at the same concert.

It was a great success for Delage, who was still largely unknown. Émile Vuillermoz commented on both the score and the public reception: "These four mélodies deserve careful study. So much poetry and freshness, so much fine sensibility in a harmonic vocabulary of a taste so exquisite that even the listeners least sympathetic to this kind sport were wont to comptemplate a second time the lone fir tree 'Lahore'." (Note: (in French) "Ces quatre mélodies mériteraient une étude minutieuse. Tant de poésie et de fraîcheur, tant de fine sensibilité s'y avouent dans un vocabulaire harmonique d'une saveur si exquise que les auditeurs les moins entraînés et les moins sympathiques à ce genre de sport voulurent contempler une seconde fois le sapin solitaire de Lahore")

Michel-Dimitri Calvocoressi summarized: "One of the great successes of the evening was for Maurice Delage's Quatre poèmes hindous, savoury and full of emotion, admirably performed ... The audience, charmed, called for an encore of the mélodies, and would gladly have had encores of the others. (Note: (in French) "Un des gros succès de la soirée fut pour les Quatre poèmes hindous de Maurice Delage, savoureux et pleins d'émotion, admirablement interprétés ... L'auditoire, charmé, fit bisser une des mélodies et eût volontiers fait bisser les autres")

== Overview ==
=== Poems ===
1. Madras

French	English
Une belle à la taille svelte se promène sous les arbres de la forêt, en se reposant de temps en temps. Ayant relevé de la main les trois voiles d'or qui lui couvrent les seins, elle renvoie à la lune les rayons dont elle était baignée.	A beautiful woman, with a slim waist, walks beneath the forest trees, halting to rest from time to time. Lifting with her hand the three golden veils that cover her breasts, she reflects back to the moon the rays in which she was bathed.

2. Lahore

French	German	English
Un sapin isolé se dresse sur une montagne Aride du nord. Il sommeille. La glace et la neige l'environnent d'un manteau blanc. Il rêve d'un palmier qui, là-bas, Dans l'Orient lointain, se désole, solitaire et taciturne, sur la pente de son rocher brûlant.	Ein Fichtenbaum steht einsam Im Norden auf kahler Höh'; Ihn schläfert; mit weißer Decke Umhüllen ihn Eis und Schnee. Er träumt von einer Palme, Die fern im Morgenland, Einsam und schweigend trauert Auf brennender Felsenwand.	A lonely fir-tree stands on a mountain's Barren northern heights. And drowses. Ice and snow envelop it In a white blanket. It dreams of a palm-tree which grieves Far away in the distant East, Solitary and silent On a blazing rocky wall.

3. Bénarès

French	English
En ce temps-là fut annoncée la venue de Bouddha sur la terre. Il se fit dans le ciel un grand bruit de nuages. Les Dieux, agitant leurs éventails et leurs vêtements, répandirent d'innombrables fleurs merveilleuses. Des parfums mystérieux et doux se croisèrent comme des lianes dans le souffle tiède de cette nuit de printemps. La perle divine de la pleine lune s'arrêta sur le palais de marbre gardé par vingt mille éléphants pareils à des collines grises de la couleur des nuages.	It was then that the coming of Buddha was announced on earth. The sky filled with a great clamour of clouds. The Gods, flourishing their fans and robes, Scattered innumerable marvellous flowers. Mysterious and sweet scents intermingled like creepers in the warm breath of that spring night. The sacred pearl of the full moon hung above the marble palace, guarded by twenty thousand elephants ike grey hills the colour of clouds.

4. Jeypur

French	English
Si vous pensez à elle, vous éprouvez un douloureux tourment. Si vous la voyez, votre esprit se trouble. Si vous la touchez, vous perdez la raison. Comment peut-on l'appeler bien-aimée ?	If you think of her, you feel an aching torment. If you see her, you grow distracted. If you touch her, you lose you your reason. How can you call her beloved?

=== Music ===
The mélodies are short, as are the poems Delage chose. Even the longest amongst them, an anonymous story about the birth of Buddha, foolows a clear melodic line, hardly troubled by the diaereses placed under certain words ("mystéri-eux", "li-anes"). The prose also inspired the composer to attempt exotic rhythms, with a quintuple meter, the use of pizzicato harmonics on the strings, and colouring principles Ravel had used in his Chansons madécasses.

By placing the two Bhartṛhari stanzas at the beginning and the end of the cycle, Delage shows a concern for formal balance, which is translated musically by the return of a phrase given to the flute in the first and last bars of Quatre poèmes hindous, "in an entirely judicious manner", (Note: (in French) "de façon tout-à-fait judicieuse") according to Flothuis:

Opening measures of "Madras"

"Lahore" stands out from the other mélodies, lasting nearly four minutes. The Heine poem, subtly ironic in its parallel of the fir numbed with cold and the palm under the burning sun, allows Delage to evoke the Far East with luxurious arpeggios on the harp. The end of the poem opens on a very pure, unaccompanied vocalization (bars 43 to 55 in the score) in which the singer must adjust her tessitura and sing à bouche fermée ("with mouth closed"), then bouche ouverte ("mouth open"), "closing the mouth bit by bit". This novel effect stunned its first audiences.

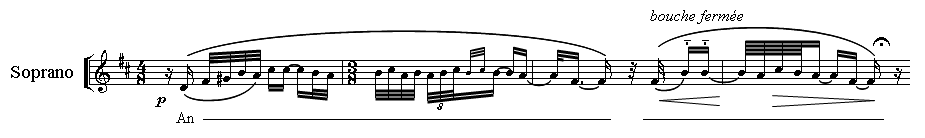
Vocal finale of "Lahore"

The instrumental accompaniment is refined. According to Vuillermoz, "Mr. Delage is a veritable child of the 20th century, with the instinctive ease of his delectable handling of dissonance, his curiosity with rare timbres, his desire to push back sonic boundaries, his skillful annexation of neighbouring lands in the unexplored domains of noise. His impatience with the yoke in the presence of the imperfections of our musical material is characteristic; he loosens the bow of his viola to B he invents a pizzicato-glissando which pulls from the string an almost human sob, he demands closed-mouth vocalizations from the female voice, and sometimes imposes on it a veiled nasal tone of an invisible mute, and all without a laborious strangeness, without bias, and virtually without searching." (Note: (in French) "M. Delage réalise très exactement le type de l'enfant du siècle—le XXe—avec son aisance instinctive dans le maniement de la dissonance "délectable", sa curiosité des timbres rares, son désir de reculer les frontières du son et de s'annexer adroitement les terrains limitrophes dans le beau domaine inexploré du bruit. Son impatience du joug en présence des imperfections de notre matériel musical est caractéristique : Il détend jusqu'au si l'arc de son violoncelle, il invente un pizzicato-glissando qui arrache à la corde un petit sanglot presque humain, il réclame de la voix féminine des vocalises à bouche fermée et lui impose parfois le doux nasillement voilé d'une sourdine invisible, et tout cela sans étrangeté laborieuse, sans parti pris et pour ainsi dire sans recherche")

Delage learned music by playing and improvising on his viola. From this he got the pizzicato-glissando which, at the beginning of "Lahore", provides a "Hindu" colour, far from pastiche—and impossible to reproduce on piano.

Opening measures of "Lahore"

== Critical analysis ==
The reception of Quatre poèmes hindous was favourable overall, though not unanimously so. Paul Martineau expressed reservations over the work for its brevity and delicately transparent character: "I must admit that after hearing Maurice Delage's Hindu mélodies, I was still waiting for the masterpiece announced! ... I will not dwell on these pieces, which are short but still too long for meagre musical interest they offer." (Note: (in French) "Je dois avouer qu'après avoir entendu les mélodies hindoues de M. Maurice Delage, j'étais encore dans l'attente du chef-d'œuvre annoncé ! ... Je n'insisterai pas sur ces morceaux courts mais pourtant trop longs pour le maigre intérêt musical qu'ils offrent") Such a negative criticism was isolated in 1914 but taken up by numerous critics of Delage's Sept haï-kaïs of 1925, which are even shorter. Delage's music has thus acquired a reputation of being "preciocities" and "sound trinkets", the "breathless" work of an amateur music. This is contradicted by his Contrerimes for piano (1927), which lasts 20 minutes, and especially his string quartet from 1949, which lasts nearly 55 minutes.

In 1960, Paul Pittion reviewed Delage's works, and wrote of the Quatre poèmes hindous: "Maurice Delage has produced little, but his mélodies, along with those of Henri Duparc, are masterworks of vocal and polyphonic composition, as well as of sensitivity." (Note: (in French) "Maurice Delage a peu produit, mais ses mélodies, au même titre que celles de Duparc, sont des chefs-d'œuvre d'écriture vocale et polyphonique, aussi bien que de sensibilité)

== Homages ==
In 1937, Georges Auric gave an account of his impression of the première performance a quarter century earlier: "While nothing is more easily intolerable than false exoticism and this tainted quaintness which has sickened us with its quite mediocre music, there is, under the prestige of an instrumentation of a rare subtlety, a very pure and deep feeling there". (Note: (in French) "Alors que rien n’est plus facilement insupportable que le faux exotisme et ce pittoresque frelaté dont toute une médiocre musique nous a dégoûtés, il y avait là, sous les prestiges d’une instrumentation d’une rare subtilité, un sentiment très pur et profond")

According to Michel Duchesneau, the co-premières of the Quatre poèmes hindous, Ravel's Trois poèmes de Mallarmé, and Stravinsky's Three Japanese Lyrics at the SMI provoked "an evolution" of the French mélodie, understood as "chamber music with voice" until 1939. In 1941, Charles Koechlin cited the cello's pizzicato-glissando (or pizz. vibrato molto) passage in his Traité de l'orchestration as a "characteristic example" of modern composition with pizzicato.

According to Michel Duchesneau, immediately after the work's première, Delage could still enjoy the esteem of the master Debussy, whose work had convinced him to devote himself to music. According to Paul Landormy, "Debussy, taken with his Poèmes hindous, asked him one day to play them to him with the music under his eyes. He nearly collapsed ..." (Note: (in French) "Debussy, enthousiasmé de ses Poèmes hindous, lui demanda un jour de les lui jouer, la musique sous les yeux. Il faillit s'effondrer ...")

== Works cited ==
- Auric, Georges (17 March 1937). "Souvenirs sur Maurice Delage". Marianne (in French).
- Calvocoressi, Michel-Dimitri (5 February 1914). "Compte-rendu du Concert de la SMI". Comœdia (in French).
- Duchesneau, Michel (1997). L'Avant-garde musicale et ses sociétés à Paris de 1871 à 1939 (in French). Éditions Mardaga. ISBN 2-87009-634-8.
- Flothuis, Marius (1996). "Exprimer l'inexprimable": Essai sur la mélodie française depuis Duparc (in French). Rodopi BV. ISBN 90-420-0087-2.
- Gallois, Jean, ed. (1998). Maurice Delage: L'exquis musicien de la qualité (Media notes) (in French). Timpani.
- Johnson, Graham; Stokes, Richard (2002). A French Song Companion. Oxford University Press. ISBN 978-0-19-924966-4.
- Landormy, Paul (1943). La Musique française après Debussy (in French). Gallimard. OCLC 3659976.
- Martineau, Paul (30 January 1914). "Compte-rendu du Concert de la SMI". Le Monde musical.
- Pittion, Paul (1960). La Musique et son histoire: tome II — de Beethoven à nos jours (in French). Éditions Ouvrières.
- Regnaud, Paul (1875), Les Stances érotiques, morales et religieuses de Bhartrihari, traduites du sanscrit (in French), E. Leroux, p. 116
- Rodriguez, Philippe (2001). Maurice Delage: La Solitude de l'artisan. Mélophiles (in French). Papillon. ISBN 2-940310-08-4.
- Vuillermoz, Émile (19 January 1914). "La Musique au Concert". Comœdia (in French). p. 2.
