= Salle Érard =

Music venue in Paris, France

Coordinates: 48.8667°N 2.3422°E

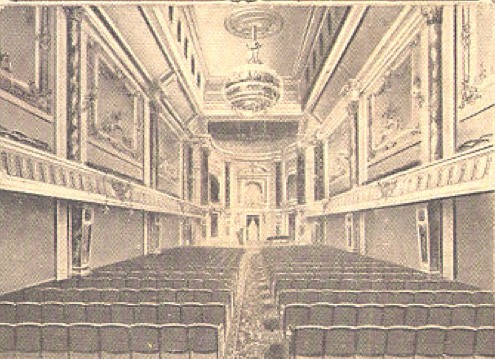
Salle Érard

The salle Érard (French pronunciation: [sal eʁaʁ]) is a music venue located in Paris, 13 rue du Mail in the 2nd arrondissement of Paris.

It is part of the hôtel particulier which belonged, from the 18th century, to the Érard family of piano, harp and harpsichord manufacturers.

Small in size, but well isolated from the noises of the city, enjoying good acoustics, it is more particularly adapted to chamber music.

During the 19th century and the beginning of the 20th, it was the place of premières and debuts noted for both compositions and for interpreters, including:

- Charles Valentin Alkan (1837 and 1880)
- Camille Saint-Saens (1860)
- Marie de Pierpont (1876)
- Vladimir de Pachmann (1882)
- Ernest Chausson, Viviane (1883)
- César Franck, Le Chasseur maudit (1883)
- Ignacy Jan Paderewski (1888)
- Maurice Ravel, Menuet antique (1892), Miroirs (1906), Histoires naturelles with Jane Bathori (1907), Trois poèmes de Mallarmé (1914), Sonate pour violon et piano (1927)
- Alexander Scriabin (1896)
- Claude Debussy, Triptyque Estampes (1904)
- Édouard Risler (1908)
- André Caplet, Conte fantastique with Micheline Kahn as the harpist, (1923)
- Jacques Ibert, Les Histoires (ten pieces for piano) (1923)
- Arthur Honegger, Le Cahier romand (1924)
- Maurice Delage, Sept haï-kaïs (1925)
- Olivier Messiaen, Huit préludes (1930)

Before the construction of the Maison de la Radio (1963), the hall served as a recording studio for the Radiodiffusion française.

Nowadays, only the salon sees the organization of concerts, the volumes of the proper room having been reconverted (the volume of spaces is suggested by the organization of the roofs as well as the old entrance facade at No. 11 rue Paul Lelong - Paris 02). Nevertheless, it remains prized for its acoustics and its past is charged with both musical and artistic history.

== Salle Érard in London ==
The Salle Erard opened its London piano gallery and recital hall on 11 July 1894 on Great Marlborough Street, with a performance by Polish pianist, Ignacy Jan Paderewski. The recital hall could accommodate an audience of 300 people. The stained glass windows featured portraits of Saint-Saëns, Gounod, Liszt, Clara Schumann, Rubinstein, Wagner, Chopin, Sigismond Thalberg and Balfe.

== See also ==
- Société Nationale de Musique
