= Orphéal =

The Orphéal was a keyboard instrument invented by the Belgian Georges Cloetens in 1910. It appears to have been a combination of piano, organ and harmonium, capable of reproducing approximations of the sounds of the cello, horn, etc.

The only occasion that people these days are likely to come across its name is on the back of Durand editions of Maurice Ravel's music, where an advertisement for Petit Poucet from Ma Mère l'Oye, arranged for Orphéal, still exists. Further arrangements exist of works by Claude Debussy, Richard Wagner, Camille Saint-Saëns, Gaetano Braga, and Gustave Samazeuilh, of whom Samazeuilh arranged nearly all existant works for the instrument.

Cloetens also invented the Luthéal, which Ravel used in two works, Tzigane and L'Enfant et les Sortilèges.
