= Henri Gil-Marchex =

French pianist and composer (1892–1970)

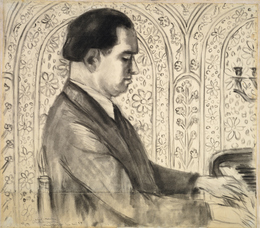
- Portrait in 1924 by Henri Matisse

Background information
- Born: Henri Émile Alphonse Gilles; 16 December 1892; Saint-Georges-d'Espéranche, Isère, France
- Died: 22 November 1970 (aged 77) Paris, France
- Education: Conservatoire de Paris
- Occupations: Pianist; composer; writer
- Years active: 1911–1954
- Spouse: Jeanne Marie Alice Marcheix (m. 1918)

Henri Gil-Marchex (Note: /ɒ̃ˈriː ʒiːl mɑːrˈʃɛks/ ahn-REE-ZHEEL-mar-SHEKS; French pronunciation: French: [ɑ̃ʁi ʒil maʁʃɛks].) (born Henri Émile Alphonse Gilles; 16 December 1892 – 22 November 1970) was a French pianist, composer and writer on music. A pupil of Louis Diémer at the Conservatoire de Paris, he built an international career as a touring recitalist and became one of the leading French advocates of contemporary music between the wars, performing works by Schoenberg, Prokofiev, Szymanowski, Bartók and Stravinsky at a time when few of his French colleagues programmed them. He was a close friend of Maurice Ravel, who described him as one of his best friends and finest interpreters, and performed in the premiere of Ravel's Tzigane in London in 1924.

Gil-Marchex is remembered above all for his work in Japan, where he is generally described as the first French pianist to perform in the country. He made four visits between 1925 and 1937, the second of them sponsored by the French government and the last supported by the Japanese Ministry of Foreign Affairs. During his visits, he gave concerts and lecture-recitals across the country, published articles on Japanese music in French journals, and drew on Japanese subjects in his own compositions. His programs introduced a large body of French repertoire to Japanese audiences for the first time and had a lasting effect on a generation of Japanese composers.

== Early life and education ==
Gil-Marchex was born Henri Émile Alphonse Gilles on 16 December 1892 at Saint-Georges-d'Espéranche, a town in the department of Isère in the Auvergne-Rhône-Alpes region. (Note: Standard reference works, including Baker's Biographical Dictionary of Musicians and the scholarship of Asako Shiraishi, give his year of birth as 1894. The French musicologist Frédéric Gaussin has since established 1892 from documentary evidence, and this date is followed by the IMSLP.) He entered the Paris Conservatoire at the age of nine, during the directorship of Gabriel Fauré, and studied the piano in the class of Louis Diémer, graduating at the head of his class with a premier prix in 1911. Surviving programmes and records from his student years show him working on Beethoven, Schumann and Brahms. He subsequently worked with the violinist Lucien Capet and the pianist Alfred Cortot.

Soon after, he began performing under his own name, Henri Gilles. In 1918, he married the painter Jeanne Marie Alice Marcheix and adopted the stage name of Gil-Marchex, formed by combining and respelling the two surnames.

== Career ==
=== Concert career and modern repertoire ===
After leaving the Conservatoire, Gil-Marchex built a repertoire centered on contemporary music and toured extensively outside France, appearing in Spain, England, Latvia and Russia, where he played Debussy and Ravel alongside Roussel and Falla. Mark Ainley, drawing on Gaussin's research, adds Egypt, the Dutch East Indies, the Philippines, and North and South America to the list, and states that Gil-Marchex covered more distance as a touring artist than Cortot, though Cortot gave the greater number of concerts. Baker's Biographical Dictionary notes his appearances with modern repertoire at European festivals. According to Ainley, he was the only French pianist of his generation who would publicly perform Schoenberg's Drei Klavierstücke, Prokofiev's Visions fugitives, and Szymanowski's Études, Op. 33, alongside the major piano works of Bartók and Stravinsky. His repertoire also extended back to the eighteenth-century French clavecinistes (clavichordists) like Jean-Philippe Rameau and François Couperin.

Composers who dedicated works to him include Albert Roussel (Prélude et fugue, Op. 46), Erwin Schulhoff (Piano Sonata No. 3), Manuel Rosenthal (Six caprices), and Pierre-Octave Ferroud (Types), with Georges Auric also named among his dedicators. In April 1924, Henri Matisse made a charcoal portrait of him, inscribed "à Gil-Marchex en toute sympathie", and the drawing was acquired by the National Museum of Western Art in Tokyo in 1966.

=== Association with Ravel ===
Gil-Marchex was among Ravel's closest friends during the 1920s and an early champion of his piano music. Ravel referred to him as one of his best friends and best performers. On 26 April 1924, at the Aeolian Hall in London, he was the pianist in the premiere of Tzigane with the violinist Jelly d'Arányi, its dedicatee, playing an instrument fitted with the luthéal piano attachment for which Ravel had written the accompaniment. He contributed an article on Ravel's piano writing to the Ravel issue of La Revue musicale of 1 April 1925.

He was the only musician Ravel authorized to arrange one of his works, producing a solo piano fantasy on the fox-trot of the two teacups from L'enfant et les sortilèges, published as Five o'clock fox-trot: fantaisie extraite de "L'enfant et les sortilèges"; a copy of the score survives in the Bibliothèque nationale de France. He introduced it in Tokyo in the autumn of 1925, and according to Arbie Orenstein, Ravel was especially pleased by the success of the Japanese concerts.

His Paris home was a gathering place for musicians and for the Japanese community in the city. In 1925, the patron Jirohachi Satsuma arranged an evening there at which the shamisen player of nagauta Kineya Sakichi IV performed for Ravel and Maurice Delage. According to Kineya's own account, Gil-Marchex received his guests in Japanese dress and served a Japanese meal, and Ravel played his Miroir II: Oiseaux tristes while Gil-Marchex played two preludes by Debussy, and Kineya and his wife performed Azuma hakkei and Chō.

=== Tours of Japan ===
Gil-Marchex visited Japan four times: in the autumn of 1925, twice during 1931 and 1932, and in 1937.

==== 1925 ====
The first tour was arranged by Satsuma, then a well-known figure in Parisian society, and was preceded by extensive coverage in the Japanese press. Over a stay of roughly three months Gil-Marchex gave twenty-two concerts, appearing in Sendai, Yokohama, Kobe, Osaka, and Kyoto as well as Tokyo, and closing with a farewell recital at the Okazaki Public Hall in Kyoto on 24 December.

The centrepiece was a series of six evening recitals at the Imperial Hotel, Tokyo, which Shiraishi regards as the fullest expression of his intentions. Rather than a display of virtuosity, he devised a systematic survey of the history of piano music from the Baroque to the present, grouping the six programs under three headings: la musique subjective, la musique évocatrice and la musique de danse. (Note: Shiraishi dates the paired programmes to 10 and 11 October (musique subjective), 17 and 24 October (musique évocatrice), and 25 October and 1 November (musique de danse).) He wrote his own notes on every work performed for a lavish fifty-one-page program booklet, using it to acquaint Japanese listeners not only with French pianism but with the history of the instrument's repertoire and with the newest music of Paris. The cover reproduced Matisse's portrait of the pianist together with a drawing of Satsuma by Tsuguharu Foujita. The series contained fifty Japanese premieres, among them one world premiere: his own fantasy on the fox-trot from L'enfant et les sortilèges. (Note: A summary of Shiraishi's earlier 2010 article gives the series as sixty-three works, of which thirty-three were Japanese premieres.)

The critic and composer Kōsuke Komatsu, who had studied in Paris, reviewed the series in the Tokyo Nichi Nichi Shimbun over three issues (14–16 October 1925) under the title "An astonishing poet of sound", praising Gil-Marchex's touch and pedalling and his refusal to exaggerate; Komatsu also translated Gil-Marchex's essay on Ravel's piano technique for the journal Ongaku Shinchō. Among those in the audience were the composers Yoritsune Matsudaira and Yasuji Kiyose, the critics Kōichi Nomura and Kenzō Nakajima, and the writers Motojirō Kajii and Shōhei Ōoka.

==== 1931–1932 ====
The second visit differed from the first in being actively supported by the French state. The Ministry of Foreign Affairs was at that period dispatching Gil-Marchex to countries around the world to promote French art, and it sponsored the Japanese tour directly. In a dispatch of 8 December 1931 to the foreign minister Aristide Briand, the French ambassador to Japan, Damien de Martel, described the concerts as propaganda for French music and argued that it mattered for a nation absorbing Western models—and anxious to meet the West as an equal—to learn that Germans were not Europe's only composers and that France had a school of its own.

Two features distinguished this tour musically: Gil-Marchex worked mainly in lecture-recital form rather than giving straight concerts, and his venues included universities and other educational institutions across the country alongside the Maison Franco-Japonaise in Tokyo, with programs weighted towards French music and themes such as "French music and Japanese sensibility". His lecture at the Maison Franco-Japonaise on 28 March 1931, entitled "The Japanese Spirit and French Music", was reported at length by Komatsu in the Tokyo Asahi Shimbun of 8 April. Illustrating his argument at the keyboard, he drew analogies between Francisque's lute music and the koto repertoire, between Couperin's Le Bavolet flottant and the prints of Utamaro, between Daquin's Le Coucou and Kanō school painting, and between Franck's Prélude, Choral et Fugue and noh theatre, closing with a proposal that young French musicians should study in Japan as Japanese musicians came to Europe.

==== 1937 ====
For his fourth and final visit Gil-Marchex received support not only from the French government but from the Japanese Society for International Cultural Relations (Kokusai Bunka Shinkōkai), founded in 1934, which selected him under its program of assistance to foreign researchers of Eastern culture and awarded him a monthly stipend of 150 yen for a year from July 1937 in support of his research on Japanese music. A recital at the Meiji Seimei Hall in May was backed by a support committee whose members included the politician Hitoshi Ashida, the industrialist Koyata Iwasaki, the diplomat Keishirō Matsui, the koto composer Michio Miyagi, and the composer Hisato Ōsawa.

During this visit he appeared as guest artist at a concert of the Japanese Society for Contemporary Music, playing works by Kiyose, Tomojirō Ikenouchi and Jiang Wenye, and on his return to France he introduced seven Japanese composers—among them Akira Ifukube, Kiyose and Jiang—to readers of the review France-Japon, writing that a promising younger generation was emerging whose efforts he expected to bear fruit.

== Writings on Japanese music ==
Gil-Marchex undertook research on Japanese music from his first visit onwards and published at least eight articles on Japanese musical culture, several of them after 1937 with the support of the Society for International Cultural Relations. (Note: A report of a meeting of the Chūbu chapter of the Musicological Society of Japan summarising Shiraishi's doctoral thesis gives the number as nine.) The best-known are "La Musique au Japon", published in La Revue musicale in 1931, and "La Musique moderne japonaise", published in France-Japon in 1939.

He was struck by the survival of Japanese traditional practice through a period of rapid modernization. Having attended performances of noh and of imperial court ceremonial music, he described their staging and instruments, and also discussed music embedded in daily life, citing tea-picking and ball-bouncing songs; he located the distinctive character of Japanese music in its melody and rhythm and considered it a resource of real value to Western composers. By 1931 he had extended his study to bunraku, kabuki, bugaku and jōruri, and wrote in detail on the koto, shamisen, tsuzumi, biwa, and hichiriki, their timbres and their playing techniques—knowledge that fed directly into his own Deux Images du vieux Japon.

In "La Musique au Japon" he argued that the Japanese attitude to nature and beauty corresponded closely to that of French composers from Couperin and Rameau through to Ravel and Ibert, that the restraint and spiritual sensitivity of French music therefore suited Japanese listeners, and that a Japanese tradition so remarkably preserved offered French art an opportunity for renewal; Europeans, he suggested, ought to study the music of the Far East as seriously as the Japanese studied theirs. Writing in France-Japon in 1939, he judged that Japanese musical life had advanced greatly since 1925, that French, Russian and Spanish music had displaced the former German predominance to good effect, and that Japanese composers would soon pass beyond imitation—warning that Japan should become neither a derivative Brahms nor a derivative Debussy.

== Teaching, criticism, and later years ==
Gil-Marchex taught at the École normale de musique de Paris between 1927 and 1930 while continuing to concertize. From 1935 to 1939 he contributed music criticism to the newspaper Paris-Soir. In 1939 he was appointed a chevalier of the Legion of Honour. In 1953 he became director of the conservatory at Poitiers. (Note: Baker's Biographical Dictionary dates the Poitiers appointment to 1956.) A French radio broadcast of 9 June 1954, in which he played his own Quatre Images du vieux Japon, two of the pieces for the first time, is the last known recording of his playing. He died at Boulogne-Billancourt on 22 November 1970.

== Compositions ==
As a composer Gil-Marchex wrote piano pieces, chamber music, mélodies and orchestral works. His best-known score is Deux Images du vieux Japon for piano, completed in 1936 and published by Max Eschig with a dedication to Cortot. (Note: IMSLP gives the first publication as 1934, while noting that the plate number could not be confirmed.) It comprises "Retour du Yoshiwara", evoking the Yoshiwara pleasure district of Edo-period Tokyo, and "Lune d'automne à Idzoumo", which draws on the tradition that in the tenth month, Kannazuki, the myriad kami of Japan assemble at Izumo, and on the moon as an object of longing in Japanese poetry. Gil-Marchex noted in the score that he had not set out to imitate Japanese music but to incorporate melodies and rhythms heard during his visits and to record the impressions they had made on him. He performed the set in Tokyo in May 1937, where Japanese critics received it harshly.

Sept chansons de geishas, for voice and piano, was completed in 1935. Its texts are drawn from Chansons des geishas, a collection of the popular songs performed by geisha in the ozashiki, published in France in 1925 in a translation by Émile Steinilber-Oberlin and Hidetake Iwamura and admired by Henri de Régnier among others. Quatre Images du vieux Japon, Les Nuits de Tokyo, and a Suite burlesque are also recorded among his piano works. Besides the authorized Ravel paraphrase, he arranged music by Lully, including the opera Persée.

== Recordings ==
Despite a career of more than four decades, Gil-Marchex recorded commercially only once. Between October and December 1927 he made forty-two sides for Columbia; most were rejected or destroyed, and the handful issued were largely out of print by 1930–31. The surviving published and rejected discs include Couperin's Le Bavolet flottant, Scarlatti and Rameau, Chopin preludes and études, Schubert's Moment musical in F minor, and Debussy's Minstrels and La Puerta del Vino. These, together with the 1954 broadcast of his own music, were collected on a compact disc issued by the Japanese label Sakuraphon, later reissued in an expanded edition.

== Legacy ==
Gil-Marchex's tours are regarded as a turning point in the reception of French music in Japan. Japanese concert life and conservatory teaching had been dominated by the German repertoire since the Tokyo Music School was founded in 1887 with a largely German teaching staff, and Shiraishi argues that the impact of his playing on Japanese music-lovers was correspondingly great. The composers Matsudaira, Kiyose, and Ichirō Ishida each stated in print that his performances had influenced them; Kiyose described discovering Franck through the concerts and being led from there to Debussy and Fauré, and reappraising French music as a result. Kiyose and Matsudaira were among the sixteen founders of the Shinkō Sakkyokuka Renmei in 1930, the body that became the Japan Society for Contemporary Music, whose members turned away from German academicism towards an affinity they perceived between impressionist technique and Japanese sensibility.

Matsudaira took private lessons from Gil-Marchex during the 1931 visit and published his teacher's suggestions on six Debussy preludes in the journal Ongaku Shinchō; although Matsudaira went on to make his career as a composer rather than a pianist, the experience helped form his outlook. The lectures also shaped the thinking of the musicologist Katsumi Sunaga (1900–1935), who wrote of the strong impression made by Gil-Marchex's argument for a harmony between French music and Japanese art.

The composer Hisato Ōsawa was a middle-school pupil when he heard Gil-Marchex play at the Kwansei Gakuin auditorium on 25 November 1925, and credited the concert with turning him towards music. The two became close during Ōsawa's later studies in Paris, and Gil-Marchex premiered his works in both countries: he was the soloist in Ōsawa's Second Piano Concerto at the Maison Gaveau in Paris on 8 November 1935, and gave the world premiere of Trois morceaux de printemps "Teichu" at the Kaiin Kaikan on 3 July 1937.

Motojirō Kajii, then a student at Tokyo Imperial University, bought a ten-yen season ticket for all six Imperial Hotel evenings and also attended the Kyoto farewell concert. His experience of the series became the subject of the short story "Kigakuteki genkaku" (器楽的幻覚, translated as "Instrumental Illusions"), published in the poetry journal Kindai fūkei on 1 May 1928 and later collected in Lemon; the "marquis famous for his love of music" who appears at its close is Yorisada Tokugawa, who had helped Satsuma bring the pianist to Japan.

The pianist Chieko Hara played for Gil-Marchex and Satsuma in Kobe in the autumn of 1925, when she was ten years old; on his recommendation she was later sent to Paris, travelling to France in 1928 to study with him before passing to other teachers and eventually entering the Paris Conservatoire. Since the 2010s, Gil-Marchex's work was the subject of renewed scholarly attention.

== Personal life ==
Gil-Marchex married the painter Jeanne Marie Alice Marcheix in 1918. Both were correspondents of Ravel: the collected edition of Ravel's correspondence prepared by Manuel Cornejo contains four letters from Ravel to Gil-Marchex (1925–1928), three to his wife (1924–1928), four from Gil-Marchex to Ravel (1925–1930), and letters from Jeanne Gil-Marchex to Ravel and, on Ravel's death in 1937, to Maurice and Nelly Delage.

In a later interview, Satsuma named Delage and himself as the friends Ravel saw most constantly, and Jeanne Gil-Marchex as the woman closest to him. According to Kishirō Murakami's biography of Satsuma, Satsuma and Jeanne Gil-Marchex were romantically involved for a time, a circumstance Murakami connects with Satsuma's decision to bring her husband to Japan.

Ainley describes him as having pursued a range of activities beyond music, working variously as an author, ethnomusicologist, reporter, racing driver, radio documentary producer, and theatre critic. Gaussin found that he was a descendant of the philosopher Denis Diderot.

== Selected works ==
- Deux Images du vieux Japon, for piano (completed 1936): "Retour du Yoshiwara"; "Lune d'automne à Idzoumo"
- Sept chansons de geishas, for voice and piano (completed 1935)
- Quatre Images du vieux Japon, for piano
- Les Nuits de Tokyo, for piano
- Suite burlesque, for piano
- Ravel, Five o'clock fox-trot: fantaisie extraite de "L'enfant et les sortilèges", for piano two hands (arrangement; first performed Tokyo, 1925)
- Lully, Persée (arrangement)
