= Jean-Michel Damase =

French pianist, conductor and composer (1928–2013)

- Born: 27 January 1928; Bordeaux, France
- Died: 21 April 2013 (aged 85); Paris, France
- Education: Conservatoire de Paris
- Occupations: pianist, composer
- Relatives: Micheline Kahn (mother)
- Writing career
- Notable awards: Grand Prix de Rome

Jean-Michel Damase (French pronunciation: [ʒɑ̃ miʃɛl damaz]; 27 January 1928 – 21 April 2013) was a French pianist, conductor and composer of classical music.

== Career ==
Damase was born in Bordeaux, the son of harpist Micheline Kahn. He was studying piano and solfège with Marcel Samuel-Rousseau at the age of five and composing by age nine. His first work (at the age of nine) was a setting of some poems by Colette, whom he had met at a Parisian salon. In 1940, Damase began studying piano with Alfred Cortot at the École Normale de Musique. The next year, he was admitted to the Conservatoire de Paris, entering Armand Ferté's piano classes and winning first prize for piano in 1943, afterwards studying with Henri Büsser, Marcel Dupré and Claude Delvincourt for composition and winning first prize for composition in 1947 for his Quintet for flute, harp, violin, viola, and cello. In the same year, he won the Grand Prix de Rome for his cantata Et la belle se réveilla. Meanwhile, he appeared as a piano soloist in the Colonne and Conservatoire concerts, and with the Orchestre National of the ORTF.

He made the first complete recording of Gabriel Fauré's nocturnes and barcarolles, for which he received the Grand Prix du Disque.

== Selected compositions ==
Orchestral

- Symphony (1952)
- Serenade for strings (1959)

Orchestrations

- La fille mal gardée (1985) (of Peter Hertel's 1864 ballet score)

Concertante

- Concerto for harpsichord or harp and small orchestra (1984)
- Concerto for viola, harp and string orchestra (1990)

Chamber music

- Trio for flute, cello and harp (1947)
- Trio for flute, viola and harp (1947)
- Quintet for flute, harp and string trio, op. 2 (1948)
- Aria for cello (or viola, or alto saxophone) and piano, op. 7 (1949)
- 17 variations for wind quintet, op. 22 (1951)
- Sonate en concert for flute, piano and cello (ad libitum), op. 17 (1952)
- Trio for flute, oboe and piano (1961)
- String Trio (1965)
- Sonata for clarinet and harp (1984)
- Vacances for alto saxophone and piano (1990)
- Intermède for viola and piano (1990)
- Épigraphe for viola and piano (1991)
- Ostinato for viola and piano (1991)
- Prélude, élégie et final for bass trombone (or tuba) and piano (1993)
- Trio for oboe, horn, and piano (1993)
- Trio for two flutes and piano (1997)
- Sonata for cello and harp (2002)
- Hallucinations for viola and harp
- Berceuse for horn and piano
- Pavane variée for horn and piano

Operas

- La tendre Eléonore (1958, premiered 1962 Marseilles, libretto L. Masson)
- Colombe (1958, premiered 1961 Bordeaux, libretto Jean Anouilh with Maria Murano)
- Eugène le mystérieux (1963, premiered 1964 Paris, libretto Marcel Achard after Eugène Sue)
- Le matin de Faust (1965, premiered 1966 Nice, libretto Y. Gautier and F. Dereyne)
- Madame de ... (1969, premiered 1970 Monte Carlo, libretto Jean Anouilh after L. de Vilmorin)
- Eurydice (1972, premiered 1972 Bordeaux, libretto Jean Anouilh)
- L'héritière (1974, premiered 1974 Nancy, libretto L. Durcreux after adaptation by R. and A. Goetz of H. James: Washington Square)

Film scores

- Term of Trial (1962)

== Sources ==
- Greene, David Mason (1985). Greene's Biographical Encyclopedia of Composers at Google Books. Reproducing Piano Roll Fnd. page 1512. ISBN 0-385-14278-1.
- Lasser, Michael. "Chez DAMASE: The Unofficial Webpage of Jean-Michel Damase".
