= Marie de Pierpont =

French composer (1844–1896)

Marie de Pierpont (4 August 1844 – February or March 1896) was a prolific French composer/arranger whose compositions included two operas and works for keyboard through at least opus 79. She performed on harmonium, organ and piano.

Pierpont was born in Sevran (Seine-Saint-Denis), France. Little is known about her early life or education. She presented recitals on harmonium, organ and piano in Paris and Belgium between 1875 and 1889, appearing in Paris at the Salon Pleyel and the Salle Erard.

Pierpont completed two operas, Le Triomphe du Coeur and Van Dyck Amoureux. Some of her works were later orchestrated by Antony Lamotte and Gilles Raspail. Pierpont's compositions were included in a 1953 collection called Hymns for the Young, a selection of motets for 1, 2, or 3 voices for use in parishes and educational institutions, by Abbé E. Dubois.

Pierpont arranged works by the following composers for harmonium or piano: Eugène Anthiome, Felix Mendelssohn Bartholdy, Luigi Boccherini, Frédéric Chopin, Eugène Dubois, Léon Fontbonne, Joseph Haydn, Jules Javelot, A. Joubert, Henri Kowalski, Giovanni Battista Martini, Étienne-Nicolas Méhul, Henri Rossignol de Noussanne, Francis Pagnon, Robert Planquette, Ferdinand Poise, Gioachino Rossini, Emile Tavan, Antonia Tissot, Carl Maria von Weber, G. Vallejos and Jules Vasseur. She set texts by the following authors to music: L. Calvet, Henri Deschâtre, D.Gervais, Eugène Gonnet, G. Nourry, Henri de Noussanne, Louis Préaubert, Camille Soubise and M. Trécourt.

Pierpont's compositions were published by Bathlot, Bornemann, Desclée De Brouwer, E. L'Huillier, J. B. Katto, J. Hiélard, Keith, Le Bailly, Le Clerc, Lissarrague, Louis Gregh, Margueritat, Poussielgue Frères and R. Smith and Co.
