= Georges Cloetens =

Belgian organ builder and inventor (1871–1949)

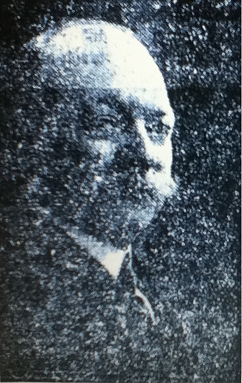
Georges Cloetens

Georges Cloetens (born Josse Léopold Cloetens, March 7, 1871, in Brussels – August 13, 1949, in Ixelles) was a Belgian organ builder and inventor, mainly known for the invention of the orphéal (1908) and the luthéal (1919).

== Biography ==
Georges Cloetens was the son of Jacques-Jean-Baptiste Cloetens, metal gilder, and Jeanne Catherine De Jongh. They lived in rue des Quatre Bras, Brussels, in 1871. He attended the Royal Conservatory of Brussels, where he followed in particular the teaching of Arthur De Greef. Georges trained as an organ builder in Pierre Schyven's workshops in Ixelles. The latter, a former apprentice of Joseph Merklin, is an organ builder and inventor, to whom we owe several instruments, including the organ with three keyboards of the royal church of Laeken or that of the Philharmonic Hall of Liège. Cloetens remained attached to his master until 1897, when he installed his first workshops at 14, rue du Belvédère, in Ixelles, which he moved in 1901 to 37, rue de Lausanne, in Saint-Gilles. During the Great War, he may move to 52, avenue Fondroy, in Uccle. Indeed, Cloetens is referenced, on its patents, as residing in Saint-Gilles until 1913 and from 1920, but in Uccle for the year 1919.

He had an apprentice, Théophile Boeckx. As an organist, Georges Cloetens organized a good number of concerts, for organ inaugurations or the promotion of his inventions, or takes part in performances of all kinds (entertaining evenings, representations of original works, etc.). His repertoire included works by old and recent composers: Henry Purcell, Georg Friedrich Haendel, Giovanni Bolzoni, Enrique Granados, Claude Debussy, Wolfgang Amadeus Mozart, and Richard Wagner.
