= Micheline Kahn =

French harpist and pianist (1889–1987)

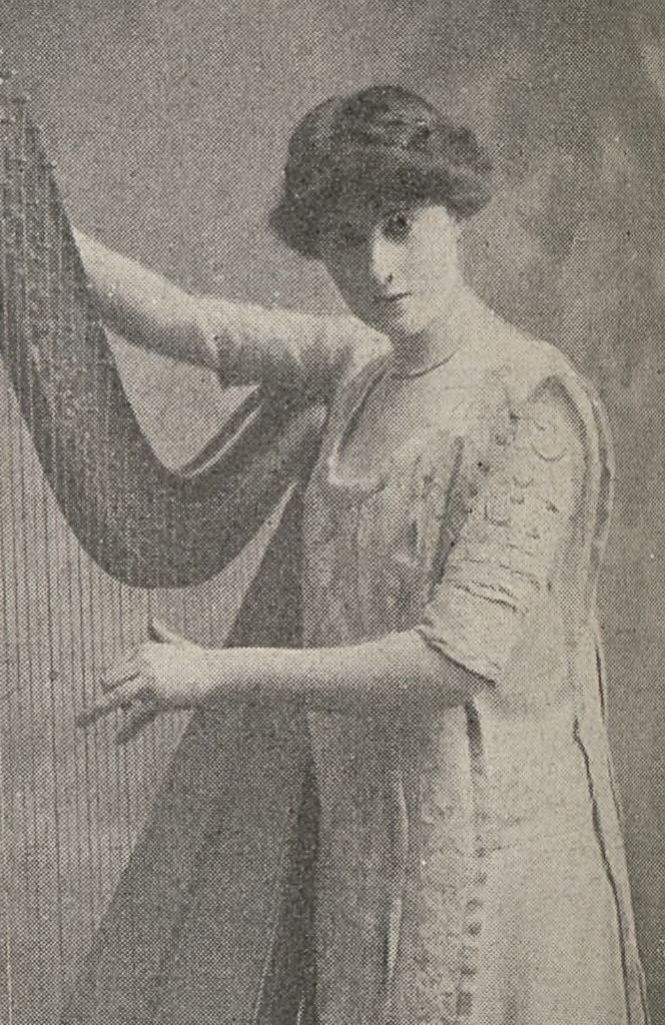
- Born: Magdeleine Micheline Kahn; 3 August 1889; 9th arrondissement of Paris
- Died: 12 March 1987 (aged 97); 18th arrondissement of Paris
- Occupation(s): Harpist; Pianist

Micheline Kahn (3 August 1889 – 12 March 1987) was a 20th-century French harpist and pianist.

== Biography ==
Kahn was a pupil of Alphonse Hasselmans at the Conservatoire de Paris, where she obtained a prize for harp in 1904, at the age of 14. She worked with André Caplet to revise the score of Légende, Étude symphonique pour harpe chromatique et corde, after The Masque of the Red Death by Poe (1908) to make a version for diatonic harp. It was completed in 1923 as the Conte fantastique. She was a professor at the École normale de musique de Paris and is the mother of composer Jean-Michel Damase.

== Premieres and dedications ==
Kahn premiered numerous works including:

- The Impromptu op. 86 by Gabriel Fauré in public creation at the Société Nationale de Musique, 7 January 1905
- The Introduction et allegro for harp, flûte, clarinet and string quartets by Maurice Ravel, 22 February 1907 at the Cercle musical of the Hôtel of the Société française de photographie in Paris
- The Rhapsodie pour harpe by Louis Vierne, 4 March 1909
- Une châtelaine en sa tour op. 110 by Gabriel Fauré, 30 November 1918 at the Société nationale de musique
- The Conte fantastique by André Caplet 18 December 1923, Salle Érard, with the quartet Gaston Poulet, in its version for diatonic harp
- The two Divertissements: I. à la française and II. à l'espagnol by André Caplet, 15 May 1924 at the théâtre du Vieux-Colombier.

Kahn transcribed for the harp several pieces such as the Berceuse, Le Jardin de Dolly or the Sicilienne by Gabriel Fauré.

In particular, Kahn was the dedicatee of the Conte fantastique d'après le Masque de la Mort rouge d'Edgar Poë and of the two Divertissements by André Caplet.
