= Luthéal =

Hybrid piano with an attachment for changing timbre

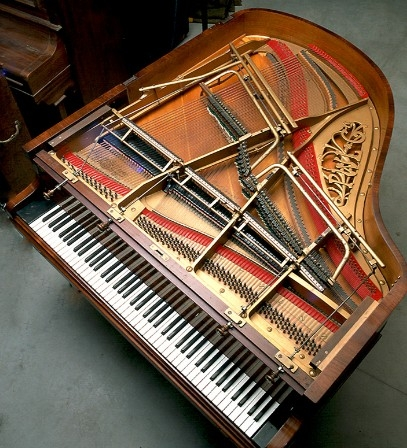
A luthéal

The luthéal is a kind of hybrid piano which extended the "register" possibilities of a piano by producing cimbalom-like sounds in some registers, exploiting harmonics of the strings when pulling other register-stops, and also some registers making other objects, which were lowered just above the strings, resound. The instrument became obsolete partly because most of its mechanics were too sensitive, needing constant adjustment. The only pieces in the general repertoire to feature the luthéal are L'enfant et les sortilèges (1920–25) and Tzigane (1924), by Maurice Ravel.

== History ==
The attachment was created by the Belgian organ builder Georges Cloetens, who first patented it on 28 January 1919 and named it the "Jeu de harpe tirée". Maurice Ravel used it in Tzigane for violin and piano, and in the opera L'Enfant et les sortilèges.

It generates a range of colours by adding two treble and two bass stops to a normal grand piano. These enable it to produce, in addition to the normal piano sound, additional timbres resembling cimbalom, harpsichord, and harp (or lute).

== Ravel and the luthéal ==
The luthéal was, in Ravel's day, a comparatively new piano attachment that had several registrations that could be engaged by pulling stops above the keyboard. One of these registrations had a cimbalom-like sound, which fitted well with the gypsy-esque idea of Tzigane. The printed version of the original scores of that piece and L'Enfant et les sortilèges contained instructions for these register-changes during execution. The Luthéal, however, did not survive: by the end of the 20th century the first print of the luthéal version of the accompaniment was still at the publishers, but the chamber version of the piece had long been performed in Ravel's alternative specification for the ordinary piano.

== The luthéal in modern times ==
A surviving original luthéal was discovered in storage in the museum of the Brussels Conservatory and has been restored by Evert Snel from The Netherlands to playing condition. This instrument was sampled in 2011 so that its sounds are also available for music productions. Evert Snel made a copy of the lutheal in a Fazioli grand piano. A new instrument was commissioned in 1987 by the French government on the occasion of the fiftieth anniversary of Ravel's death, and is now in the Musée de la Musique, Paris.

== Revivals ==
Violinist Daniel Hope recorded in 2004 a performance of Ravel's Tzigane that features a reconstructed luthéal, which Hope describes in a National Public Radio interview as "a cross between a typewriter and an organ that attaches to the strings of a piano" and produces "an amazing sound world." Violinist Chantal Juillet also made a recording with Pascal Rogé on piano luthéal, found on Ravel: The Complete Editions on Decca Records. Violinist Sarah Nemtanu also recorded Ravel's Tzigane with Romain Descharmes on piano luthéal on Naïve Records., as did violinist Lina Tur Bonet with Pierre Goy on Challenge Records.

The composer Jan-Peter de Graaff composed his Concerto No. 7 for luthéal and orchestra in 2024, on a commission from NTR Zaterdagmatinee. It was composed for the pianist/luthéalist Hannes Minnaar and Radio Filharmonisch Orkest, who premièred it on the 11 May 2024 in a concert conducted by Karina Canellakis.

== See also ==
- Orphéal
