= Rose Féart =

French singer

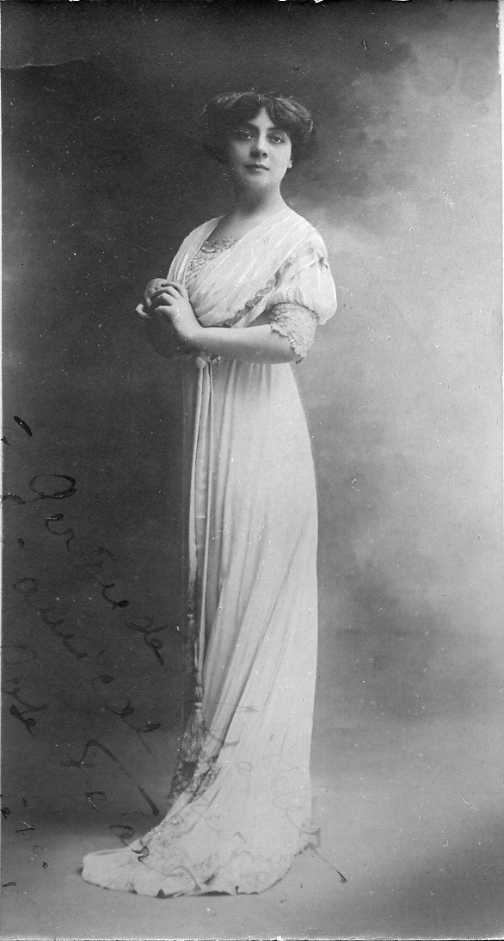
- Rose Féart
- Born: 26 March 1878; Saint-Riquier, France
- Died: 5 October 1954 (aged 76); Geneva
- Education: Conservatoire de Paris
- Occupations: Operatic singer (soprano); Music educator

Rosalie Gautier (26 March 1878 – 5 October 1954), Rose Féart on stage, was a Franco-Swiss singer (soprano) and singing teacher.

== Biography ==
Rose Fréart was born in Saint-Riquier. Her father was a sugar industrialist. Shortly after the birth of his daughter, he returned to his hometown of Argenton-sur-Creuse, where Rose Féart spent her entire childhood. She was introduced to music by the organist of Église Saint-Sauveur d'Argenton-sur-Creuse, Anselme Picardeau, who detected the child's vocal qualities. Sent to Paris to continue her musical studies, she won the first prize of the Conservatoire de Musique in lyrical declamation on 2 August 1902, at the age of 24.

Her soprano voice was noticed by the Opéra de Paris who immediately engaged her. Rose Féart became one of the most important opera singers for the great repertoire, especially in Wagnerian roles, and worked with composers of her time such as Massenet, Fauré, Debussy, César Franck, and André Caplet. Her career developed quickly, in operas and concerts, and lasted 20 years, in France and Switzerland as well as in other major opera houses in Europe.

She died in Geneva on 5 October 1954 aged 76.

== Roles ==
- 1902: Don Giovanni, Mozart (Donna Anna), Opéra de Paris
- 1903: Les Huguenots, Meyerbeer (Valentine), Opéra de Paris; Tannhäuser, Wagner (Elisabeth), Opéra de Paris; Le prophète, Meyerbeer (Berthe), Opéra de Paris
- 1904: Il trovatore, Verdi (Leonora), Opéra de Paris
- 1904/1905: Tristan und Isolde, Wagner (Brangäne), stage creation at the Paris Opera House
- 1905: Armide, Gluck (La Haine), Opéra de Paris; Ariane, Massenet (Phèdre), Opéra de Paris
- 1906: La Gloire de Corneille (cantata), Saint-Saëns; Armide (La Haine), Messager conductor, at Covent Garden; Lohengrin, Wagner (Ortrude), Opéra de Paris; Die Walküre, Wagner (Brünhilde), Opéra de Paris
- 1908: Prométhée, Fauré (Bia), direction Fauré, premiered in Paris at the hippodrome de Paris then Opéra de Paris; Aida, Verdi, Opéra de Paris; Rédemption, Édouard Blanc (L'Ange), direction Messager, Conservatoire de Paris
- 1908/1909: Götterdämmerung, Wagner (Gutrune), direction Messager, stage premiere at the Opéra de Paris; Lohengrin (Elsa), Opéra de Paris
- 1909 : Pelléas et Mélisande, Debussy (Mélisande), premiere at Covent Garden septuor pour quatuor à cordes et trois voix féminines, André Caplet, premiere, Criquebeuf-en-Caux
- 1910: La Damoiselle élue, Debussy, direction Messager
- 1911: Rose Féart was chosen by Debussy to create his Martyre de Saint Sébastien (La Vierge Érigone) at the Théâtre du Châtelet but, at the last moment, she abandoned the production which provoked religious tinted controversy, and was replaced by her double, a debutant lyrical soprano spotted by Debussy, Ninon Vallin, who was successful at the premiere and thus began her great international career, which led Rose Féart to take over her role when she witnessed Vallin's success; Lohengrin (Elsa)
- 1913: Der Freischütz, Carl Maria von Weber, conductor Felix Weingartner, Théâtre des Champs-Élysées; Boris Godunov, Mussorgsky, conductor Inghelbrecht, Théâtre des Champs-Élysées; Poèmes Indous pour soprano et dix instruments, Maurice Delage, premiere
- 1914: Le Vieux Coffret, pour voix et piano, André Caplet, premiere, Yport
- 1914/1918: Rose Féart multiplied patriotic recitals during the war, including at Argention-sur-Creuse where she stayed with her family
- 1916: Mélodie pour harpe, André Caplet, premiere, at Les Éparges
- 1918: Détresse, for voice and piano, André Caplet, premiere. Called by Albert Paychère to make a replacement for the Alceste by Gluck at the Grand Théâtre de Genève, she won a triumph and conquered the public's admiration and affection. She moved to Geneva where she stayed for the rest of her life, becoming a Swiss citizen.
- 1919/1920: Pelléas et Mélisande (Mélisande) and Don Giovanni (Donna Anna) in Geneva
- Armide, Lohengrin and Iphigénie en Tauride by Gluck, the three in Geneva
- 1921: concerts with arias of Armide and a song cycle by Maurice Emmanuel including Odelettes Anacréoniques, Conservatoire de Paris
- 1921/1922: last season at the Grand Théâtre de Genève. The soprano was then 44 years old.
- 1922: Iphigénie en Tauride, Chorégies d'Orange
- 1923: Le Martyre de Saint Sébastien, Grand Théâtre de Genève Armide, Chorégies d'Orange.

Rose Féart then devoted herself to a career as a singing teacher at the Conservatoire de Musique de Genève where she taught until her death at the age of 76. Mezzo-soprano Hélène Morath was one of her students and succeeded Rose Féart's faculty position at the Haute École de musique de Genève from 1960 to 1984.

== Iconography ==
Many photographs of Rose Féart in stage dress have been preserved.

== Homage ==
- Jean Cocteau, six poésies dédiées à Rose Féart, 1920, set in music by Arthur Honegger, salle Pleyel, Paris, 1926

== Bibliography ==
- Féart, Rose (1918). Exercices vocaux adoptés par Mlle Rose Féart ... : en usage au conservatoire de Genève. Geneva: éditions Henn. p. 8. OCLC 79253706.
- Rose Féart, Christophe Delhoume
- Histoire du Grand Théâtre de Genève, Roger de Candolle
- "Rose Féart, une diva (p. 37-44), in Personnages ayant marqué la ville d'Argenton-sur-Creuse et sa région, Jean Anatole, 171 pp., Le Trépan, Argenton-sur-Creuse, 2007
- "Rose Féart" in Argentonnais connus et méconnus, Cercle d'histoire d'Argenton-sur-Creuse, Argenton, 2010
- Encyclopédie Larousse, article sur Maurice Delage
- "Rose Féart", Pierre Brunaud, p. 52–55, in Argenton de A à Z en 44 rubriques historiques, 175 pp., Imprimerie Bonnamour, Argenton-sur-Creuse, 2013 ISBN 978-2-9546955-0-1.
