= Tzigane =

Composition by Maurice Ravel

- by Maurice Ravel
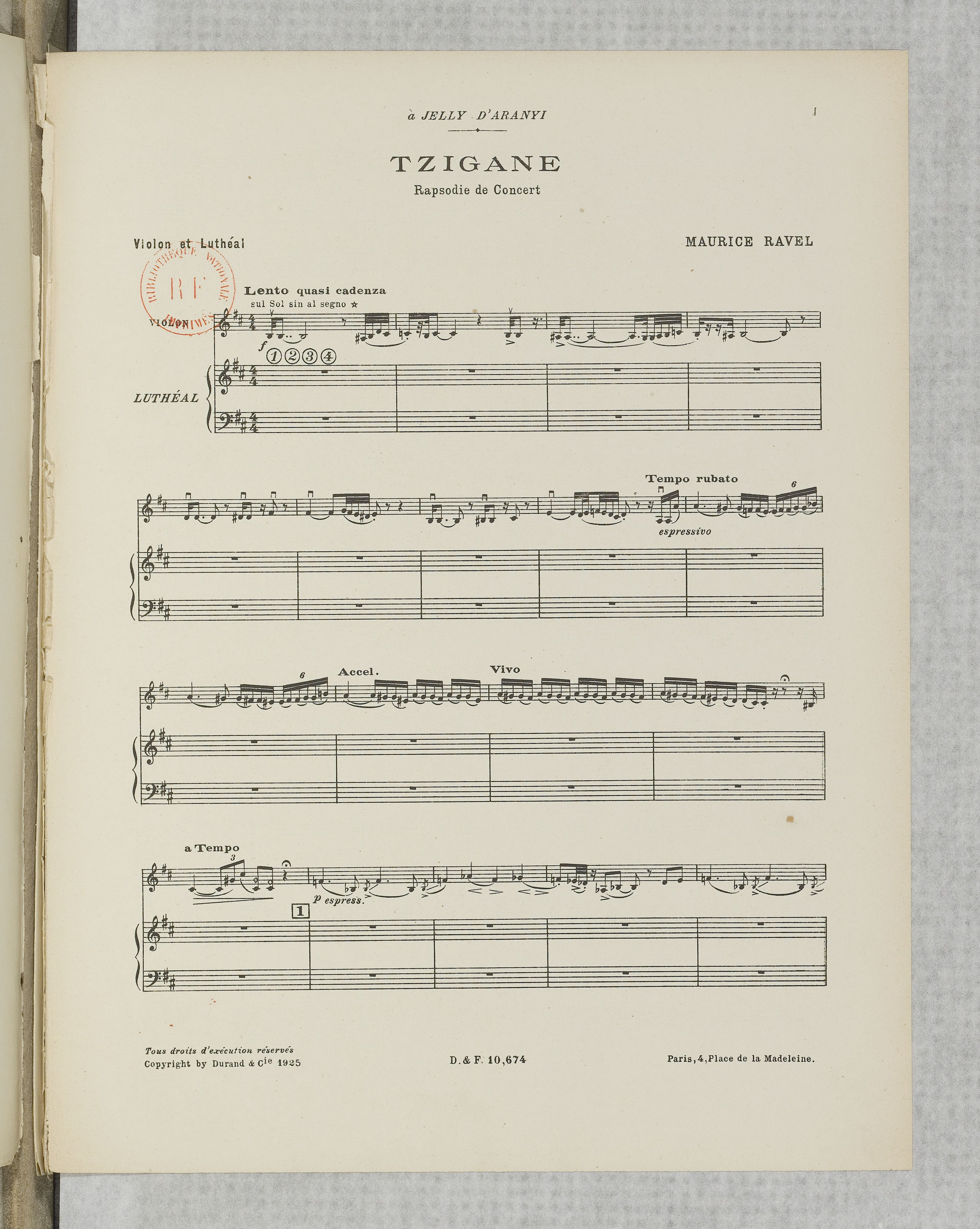
- First page of first edition
- Other name: Rhapsodie de concert
- Key: D major
- Catalogue: M. 76
- Composed: 1924
- Dedication: Jelly d'Arányi
- Published: 1924
- Scoring: violin; luthéal; violin; piano; violin; orchestra

Tzigane is a rhapsodic composition by the French composer Maurice Ravel featuring a virtuosic violin part. The original instrumentation was for violin and piano (with optional luthéal attachment). The first performance took place in London on 26 April 1924 with the dedicatee, Jelly d'Arányi, on the violin and Henri Gil-Marchex at the piano. In his biographical sketch of 1928 Ravel termed it a rapsodie de concert, as "a virtuoso piece in the style of a Hungarian rhapsody". It consists of "a string of successive variations juxtaposed without development".

== Background ==
In the early 1920s, Ravel had been planning a piece for violin and piano for his closest female friend, Hélène Jourdan-Morhange. Around the same time Ravel became acquainted with Hungarian violinist d'Arányi when she played his Sonata for Violin and Cello with Hans Kindler in London at a private soirée, and afterwards regaled the composer with a selection of folk-tunes from her country until 5 in the morning. In the ensuing two years Jourdan-Morhange retired from playing due to a chronic illness. Ravel put aside the sonata he had intended for Jourdan-Morhange and was inspired to write a virtuoso piece that "could not be anything but Hungarian". During composition, Ravel consulted with both Jourdan-Morhange and d'Arányi on the violin figuration, studied the Paganini Caprices, and studied Liszt's Hungarian Rhapsodies that were supplied to him by Lucien Garban. It is dedicated to Jelly d'Arányi.

Ravel orchestrated the piano part in July 1924, and also created a version of the piano score noted for luthéal accompaniment. The autograph manuscript for the orchestrated version is held by the Morgan Library & Museum.

The name of the piece is derived from the generic European term for "gypsy" (in French: gitan, tsigane or tzigane rather than the Hungarian cigány) although it does not use any authentic Gypsy melodies.

== Music ==
Tzigane is a late entry into the gypsy-themed violin virtuoso concert piece; the most prominent prior works being Sarasate's Zigeunerweisen from 1878 and Vittorio Monti's Czárdás. Ravel's audience would also have been familiar with a style hongrois that had suffused light music and the Parisian café scene.

The composition is in one movement, with an approximate duration of ten minutes, scored for strings and harp, double woodwinds, two horns in F, one trumpet in C, celesta, triangle, timbre (snare drum), and cymbal. The opening is marked 'Lento, quasi cadenza' and is for solo violin, playing on the G string for the first 28 bars; Jankélévitch describes the preamble (Lassan) as "superior exercises – runs, staccato notes, trills and mordents". Then follow a succession of "gipsy improvisations – the Friska, then the Czardas", at the end of which "the rhapsody becomes impatient and runs feverishly through all kinds of successive tonalities without retaining any of them".

Rhythmical, structural, and melodic elements in common with Liszt's Hungarian Rhapsodies have been identified. Liszt's attempts to mimic the cimbalom may have inspired Ravel to create a version of the score that included the use of the luthéal, a new piano attachment (first patented in 1919) with several tone-colour registrations which could be engaged by pulling stops above the keyboard. One of these registrations had a cimbalom-like sound, which fitted well with the verbunkos style of the composition. The original score of Tzigane included instructions for these register-changes during execution. The luthéal, however, did not achieve permanence. By the end of the 20th century the first print of the accompaniment with luthéal was still available at the publishers, but by that time the attachment had long since disappeared from use.

== Noteworthy performances ==
- April 26, 1924: Premiere (violin and piano), by Jelly d'Arányi and Henri Gil-Marchex in London at Aeolian Hall.
- October 15, 1924: Premiere (violin and piano with luthéal), by Samuel Dushkin and Beveridge Webster in Paris at Salle Gaveau
- October 19, 1924: Premiere (violin and orchestra), by Samuel Dushkin with Pierre Monteux conducting the Concertgebouw in Amsterdam
- November 30, 1924: first performance in Paris of orchestrated version, and first performance of orchestrated version by d'Arányi, with Gabriel Pierné and the Concerts Colonne.
- January 1930: Gramophone released the first commercial recording, made from a live performance by Lucien Schwartz, violinist in the Orchestre Pasdeloup, with Ravel in the audience.

== Critical reception ==
The critical reception of Tzigane has been generally unfavorable, categorizing the work as kitsch.

Contemporaries Jourdan-Morhange, Szigeti, and Sauguet all expressed doubts on the music's value, labelling it pastiche and finding "music has surrendered too much place to instrumental acrobatics". Tzigane did not rate a mention in Alexis Roland-Manuel's 1938 biography of Ravel.

Recent critique has been as unfavorable. While noting the work's enduring popularity with performers and record labels, Roger Nichols and Robert Orledge have both noted Tzigane is not one of Ravel's compositionally great works.

Nevertheless, the work is popular with performers and is frequently recorded.
