= Société musicale indépendante =

The French société musicale indépendante (SMI) was founded in 1910 in particular by Gabriel Fauré, Maurice Ravel, Charles Koechlin and Florent Schmitt.

When the SMI was founded, the Société nationale de musique was the main Parisian company defending French musical creation. Some composers did not like the atmosphere of this society, which remained extremely faithful to César Franck. Some of Ravel's works were not well received, others by Charles Koechlin, Maurice Delage or Ralph Vaughan Williams were refused.

Ravel then left the Société nationale and became one of the founders of the independent society, whose aim was to support contemporary musical creation, freeing it from restrictions linked to the forms, genres and styles of programmed works.

== Executive committee ==
The founding president of the SMI was Gabriel Fauré. Among others, the executive committee would include:

- Louis Aubert
- Béla Bartók
- Nadia Boulanger
- Manuel de Falla
- Arthur Honegger
- Jacques Ibert
- Charles Koechlin
- Maurice Ravel
- Albert Roussel
- Florent Schmitt
- Arnold Schoenberg
- Igor Stravinsky
- Jules Écorcheville

== 1914–1935 ==
During the First World War, strong attempts were made to bring the old and new societies together. Vincent d'Indy stood down as president of the Société nationale to allow his old friend Fauré to become president of both organisations in readiness for the merger, but the younger elements of the SMI were not reconciled with the old guard, and the proposal foundered. The two organisations continued to function separately until the SMI was wound up in 1935, after giving 171 concerts in its 25 years of existence.

== See also ==
- Society for Private Musical Performances

== Sources ==
- Nectoux, Jean-Michel (1991). Gabriel Fauré: A Musical Life. Cambridge: Cambridge University Press. ISBN 978-0-52-123524-2.

== Bibliography ==
- Il primo concerto della Société musicale indépendante. In Flavio Testi, La Parigi musicale del primo Novecento: cronache e documenti, Torino: EDT, 2003, (pp. 224–235), ISBN 88-7063-693-3 (Google books)
- "La Société musicale indépendante". In Michel Duchesneau, L’avant-garde musicale et ses sociétés à Paris de 1871 à 1939, Paris: Mardaga, 1997, (pp. 65–115), ISBN 2870096348, ISBN 9782870096345 (Google books)
- Arbie Orenstein, Ravel: man and musician, New York; London: Dover Publications, 1975, ISBN 0231039026
