= Le Petit Elfe Ferme-l'œil =

Orchestral suite by Florent Schmitt

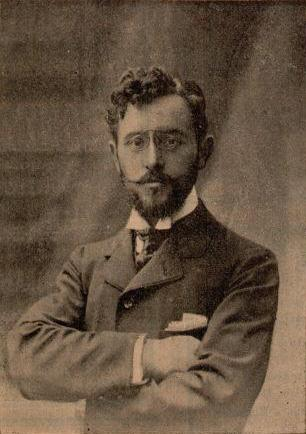
Florent Schmitt in 1900

Le Petit Elfe Ferme-l'œil (Op. 73) is an orchestral suite by Florent Schmitt adapted from his music for the homonymous ballet ("divertissement chorégraphique") after a tale by Hans Christian Andersen. The concert suite developed from a piano four hands suite written in 1912 entitled une semaine de Petit Elfe ferme-l'œil was premiered on 1 December 1923 at the Concerts Colonne under the direction of Gabriel Pierné. The ballet was premiered on 5 February 1924 at the Opéra-Comique of Paris under the direction of Albert Wolff.

== Analysis ==
The suite relates the extraordinary dreams of little Hialmar in seven pieces like the seven days of the week, preceded by a prelude.

1. Prelude
2. La fête nationale des souris: danse du peuple des souris
3. La cigogne lasse: Sarabande
4. Le cheval de Ferme-l'œil: galop à la poursuite de la cigogne
5. Le mariage de la poupée Berthe: alternance d'un motif de cloches et d'un thème de marche
6. La ronde des lettres boiteuses: motif sur un rythme claudicant
7. La promenade à travers le tableau: motif de berceuse
8. Parapluie chinois: deux thèmes sur la gamme pentatonique
- Running time: 40 minutes

== Sources ==
- François-René Tranchefort, Guide de la musique symphonique Fayard 1989 (p. 679)
