= Maurice Delage =

French composer and pianist (1879–1961)

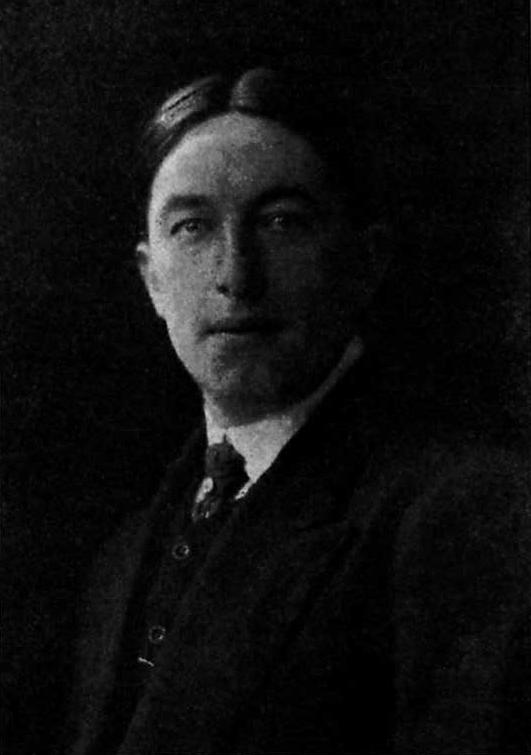
Maurice Delage 1912

Maurice Charles Delage (13 November 1879 – 19 or 21 September 1961) was a French composer and pianist.

== Life and career ==
Maurice Charles Delage lived and died in Paris. He first worked as a clerk for a maritime agency in Paris, and later as a fishmonger in Boulogne. He also served for a time in the French army, before embarking on a music career in his twenties. A student of Ravel, who proclaimed him one of the supreme French composers of his day, and member of Les Apaches, he was influenced by travels to India and Japan in 1912, when he accompanied his father on a business trip. Ravel's "La vallée des cloches" from Miroirs was dedicated to Delage.

Delage's best known piece is Quatre poèmes hindous (1912–1913). His Ragamalika (1912–1922), based on the classical music of India, is significant in that it calls for prepared piano; the score specifies that a piece of cardboard be placed under the strings of the B-flat in the second line of the bass clef to dampen the sound, imitating the sound of an Indian drum.

== Selected works ==
Poèmes symphoniques

- Conté par la mer (1908)
- Les Bâtisseurs de ponts (1913) after Rudyard Kipling
- Overture to Ballet de l'avenir (1923)
- Contrerimes (1931), orchestration of pieces for piano
- Bateau ivre (1954) after the poem by Arthur Rimbaud
- Cinq danses symphoniques (1958)

Chamber music

- String quartet (1949)
- Suite française for string quartet (1958)

Mélodies (voice and piano)

- Trois mélodies (1909)
- Ragamalika, chant tamoul (1914)
- Trois poèmes (1922)
- Ronsard à sa muse (1924)
- Les Colombes (1924)
- La Chanson de ma mie (1924)
- Les Demoiselles d'Avignon (1924)
- Sobre las Olas (1924) on a poem by Jean Cocteau
- Toute allégresse (1925) on a poem by Paul-Jean Toulet

Mélodies (voice with instrumental ensemble)

- Quatre poèmes hindous (1912)
- Sept haï-kaïs (1924) for soprano and chamber orchestra (to be sung without a break between songs)
1. Préface du Kokinshū (tanka by Ki no Tsurayuki), dedicated to Mrs. Louis Laloy;
2. Les herbes de l’oubli…, dedicated to Andrée Vaurabourg (future spouse of Arthur Honegger);
3. Le coq…, dedicated to Jane Bathori (première performer of the work);
4. La petite tortue…, dedicated to Mrs. Fernand Dreyfus (the mother of Roland-Manuel);
5. La lune d’automne…, dedicated to Suzanne Roland-Manuel (the spouse of Roland-Manuel);
6. Alors…, dedicated to Denise Jobert (the daughter of the editor);
7. L’été…, dedicated to Georgette Garban.
- Deux fables de La Fontaine (1931), Le Corbeau et le Renard, and La Cigale et la Fourmi
- Trois chants de la jungle (1934) after Kipling
- In morte di un samouraï (1950) on a collection of haïkaïses and tankas by Pierre Pascal
- Trois poèmes désenchantés (1955)

Music for solo piano

- Schumann... (1918)
- Contrerimes (1927)
