= Andrey Kasparov =

Armenian composer, musician, academic (born 1966)

- Անդրեյ Կասպարով
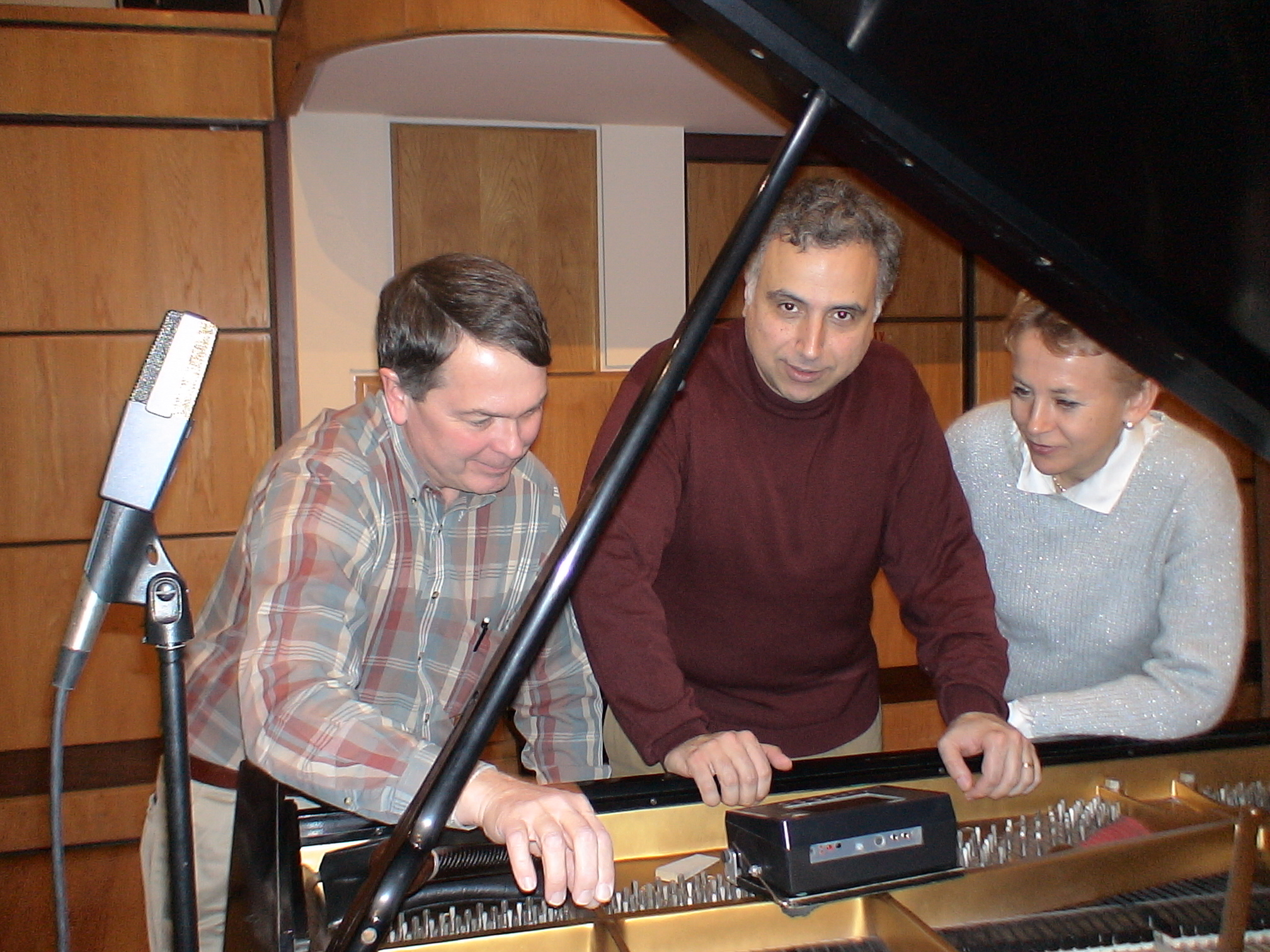
- Left to right: Henry Faivre (piano technician), Andrey Kasparov and Oksana Lutsyshyn
- Born: Andrey Rafaili Kasparov; April 6, 1966 (age 60); Baku, Azerbaijan SSR (now Azerbaijan)
- Occupations: Classical pianist; composer; academic
- Years active: 1985–present
- Spouse: Oksana Lutsyshyn

Andrey Rafailovich Kasparov (Armenian: Անդրեյ Րաֆաիլի Կասպարով, romanized: Andrey Rafaili Kasparov; Russian: Андрей Рафаилович Каспаров, romanized: Andrey Rafailovich Kasparov; born 6 April 1966) is an Armenian-American pianist, composer, and professor, who holds both American and Russian citizenship.

== Biography ==
=== Early life and education ===
Kasparov was born on 6 April 1966 in Baku, Azerbaijan, to a family of Armenian descent. He began his musical studies at the age of six, and he moved to Moscow at fifteen. He later entered the Moscow State Conservatory, graduating with honors in Music Composition and Piano, in 1989 and 1990, respectively. At the Conservatory, he studied harmony and counterpoint were with Yuri Kholopov, a famous Russian musicologist. Among his keyboard instructors were Nina Emelianova, Vladimir Bunin, Sergei Dizhur, Dmitri Sakharov, and Victor Merzhanov. His composition studies began with Tatyana Chudova and Tikhon Khrennikov; he later continued them in the independent studio of Alexandr Chaikovsky. In 1985, he was awarded a Third Prize for his Toccata for piano, and in 1987, was awarded Second Prize for his Six Aphorisms for flute, violin and cello, at the All-USSR Composition Competition.

Kasparov pursued subsequent doctoral studies in composition at the Jacobs School of Music and the Indiana University at Bloomington, with Claude Baker, Wayne Peterson, Harvey Sollberger, and Eugene O'Brien, and conducting instructor, Thomas Baldner. He also participated in Courses for New Music in 1996, in Darmstadt, Germany. In 1997 he was awarded Second Prize at the Prokofiev International Composers Competition for his Piano Sonata No. 2, a work on two contrasting twelve-tone rows. Kasparov earned his D.M. in Music Composition from Indiana University in 1999.

=== Professional career ===
Presently, Kasparov serves as a Professor of Music at Old Dominion University in Norfolk, Virginia, where he teaches undergraduate and graduate music composition, piano, and all levels of undergraduate music theory, as well as leading the new music ensemble.

Between 1998 and 2008, Kasparov led Creo, the Old Dominion University's resident ensemble for contemporary music. The group's final performance in March 2008, featured the premiere of Kasparov's composition, Tsitsernakabert, for modern dance and six musicians: alto flute, bass/ contrabass flute, violin, two percussionists, and mezzo-soprano. Among the participating artists were members of the Second Wind Dance Company and mezzo-soprano Lisa Relaford Coston. Co-choreographed by Beverly Cordova Duane and Christina Yoshida, the work opened with eight dancers posed in a circle, inclined toward the circle's centre in a tableau reminiscent of the eponymous memorial to victims of the Armenian Genocide. Kasparov had previously worked with the Second Wind Dance Company in 2005, in collaboration with choreographer Jelon Vieira, on Iao, an original work for dance, mezzo-soprano, and percussion, which incorporated elements of traditional Afro-Brazilian dance and Capoeira, the Brazilian martial art.

Besides his career as a composer and academic, Kasparov is a concert pianist and recording artist, whose discography encompasses several record labels including Albany Records and Naxos Records. Since 2009, he has shared the Artistic Directorship of the Norfolk Chamber Consort with wife and fellow pianist, Oksana Lutsyshyn. Together, they are co-founders of the Invencia Piano Duo.

=== Work on Béla Bartók ===
Beginning in 1994 and in conjunction with Peter Bartók and Nelson Dellamaggiore, Kasparov began research into editing projects concerning Béla Bartók's Piano Concerto No. 3 and his Viola Concerto.

Bartók's health grew steadily worse as he worked to complete his Third Piano Concerto, and his rapid decline eventually forced him to concede admittance to a hospital. Consequently, the last seventeen measures of the score were left in rough sketch. Before entering the hospital, however, he gave explicit instructions to his son, Peter, to insert seventeen bar-lines and a double-bar at the end; in his haste to finish the work, Béla had noted the precise ending in his native Hungarian. Bartók never returned to oversee the Piano Concerto's completion, having succumbed to leukemia on 26 September 1945. Final orchestration was eventually executed from the composer's notes by his friend, Tibor Serly. The Third Piano Concerto was later published in an edition by Serly and Erwin Stein, an editor for Boosey & Hawkes. The original manuscript, along with numerous others, then became the subject of a protracted legal dispute between a trustee of Bartók's estate, Peter, and Béla's second wife, Ditta Pásztory-Bartók. The trustee asserted the composer had lost title to his own work in his lifetime, a claim disputed by Peter Bartók. The same trustee also denied Ditta's right to any income from music sales, so long as ownership remained in contest. Throughout the forty subsequent years of legal battles, all of the original manuscripts remained inaccessible. Only with the deaths of both the trustee and Ditta was Peter able to regain full possession of his father's documents and begin the long-overdue process of editing them. It was at this time the Viola Concerto, presumed lost, was rediscovered, amongst the possessions of the deceased trustee.

Peter Bartók's intent, in association with Nelson Dellamaggiore, was to reprint and revise past editions of both scores, as well as to eradicate the many printed errors identified but never corrected by his father. Although few in actual number, changes made to the Piano Concerto affected the pitch content, pedalling, and tempos of several key passages. Overall, the revisions included including pencil markings by the composer in the final manuscript, not reproduced in the final photo-reproduction; adding revisions based on initial sketches by Béla Bartók; incorporating suggestions by editors and musicians involved in past performances of the Concerto; correcting typographical errors; and correcting errors in the printed piano part, appearing only in the two-piano reduction of the score.

In 1994, Kasparov was soloist with the Columbus Indiana Philharmonic (formerly Columbus Pro Musica) in the world premiere of the revised edition of Béla Bartók's Piano Concerto No. 3. According to conductor David Bowden, and Peter Bartók, who was in attendance:

"These changes generally make the piano part more accessible or clarify questions of chordal structure...."

The revised editions of both the two-piano reduction and the orchestral score of the Piano Concerto No. 3 are available from Boosey & Hawkes.

=== Hommages Musicaux ===
In 1920, in tribute to the late Claude Debussy, the French music journal La Revue musicale commissioned works by contemporary composers and concert artists. The collection was published under the title Tombeau de Claude Debussy, with contributions from Paul Dukas, Albert Roussel, Gian Francesco Malipiero, Eugene Goossens, Béla Bartók, Florent Schmitt, Igor Stravinsky, Maurice Ravel, Manuel de Falla, and Erik Satie. Encouraged by the success of this premiere collaboration, editor Henry Prunières proposed a second dedicatory work. Published in 1922, seven of Gabriel Fauré's students laboured to produce Hommage à Gabriel Fauré. Ravel offered a work for solo violin; Charles Koechlin and Jean Roger-Ducasse composed four hands pieces for the piano; George Enescu, Louis Aubert, Florent Schmitt, and Paul Ladmirault each contributed pieces for solo piano.

Released in 2007 by Albany Records, with violinists Desiree Ruhstrat and Pavel Ilyashov, cellist David Cunliffe, guitarist Timothy Olbrych, and mezzo-soprano Lisa Relaford Coston, the Invencia Piano Duo (Andrey Kasparov and Oksana Lutsyshyn) produced Hommages Musicaux, which contained both Tombeau de Claude Debussy and Hommage à Gabriel Fauré.

=== Work on Florent Schmitt ===
In the mid 1990s, during production of Hommages Musicaux, the Invencia Piano Duo was introduced to the catalogue of composer Florent Schmitt. Intended as a tribute to Claude Debussy and Gabriel Fauré, the recording featured Tombeau de Claude Debussy and Hommage à Gabriel Fauré. Within each of these cycles was contained one of Schmitt's works for piano. Kasparov and Lutsyshyn were:

“...captivated by the richness of Schmitt’s multi-layered harmonies and textures, as well as the vitality of the rhythmic structures in the music.”

Kasparov's dedication to Florent Schmitt's duo-piano music, in collaboration with Oksana Lutsyshyn, culminated in the release of four CDs by Naxos Records as part of its Grand Piano series.

Issued in 2012, Volume 1 contained Schmitt's Trois rapsodies, Op. 53, and the first-ever recording of Schmitt's Sept pièces, Op. 15, composed in 1899. The album concluded with a previously unpublished work, Rhapsodie parisienne. Composed in 1900, it is one of two unpublished duets by Schmitt. According to Kasparov, pencil notations in the score indicated the composer intended it for later orchestration. Special permission to record Rhapsodie parisienne was granted by Mme. Annie Schmitt, granddaughter of Florent. The first volume was voted "Recording of the Month" and "Critics' Choice" by MusicWeb International and Naxos Records, respectively, in May 2013.

It is unclear whether many of Schmitt's works for piano duet had ever received formal public performances in Europe, prior to the Invencia Piano Duo's revival of his compositions. A number appear to have been composed by Schmitt as piano études, particularly the two premiere recordings, Sur cinq notes, Op. 34 and Eight Easy Pieces, Op. 41, which were included on Volume 2. Kasparov has asserted that Schmitt experimented with a method of composition based on the first five notes of the diatonic scale, an approach later adopted by the likes of Igor Stravinsky in both his Five Easy Pieces for piano duet, published in 1917, and his Les cinq doigts for solo piano, published in 1921.

Volume 3 heralded the debut recordings of a six-movement work composed between 1895 and 1902, Musiques foraines, Op. 22, and the Marche du 163 R.I., Op. 48. Volume 4 featured yet another of Schmitt's compositions derived from the five set notes of the primo part, Trois pièces récréatives, Op. 37. The same album contained the first-ever issue of the Lied et Scherzo, Op. 54, in Schmitt's version for piano four-hands, played on two pianos; composed in 1910 for double woodwind quintet; alternate editions of this piece were also prepared by the composer for horn and piano, as well as cello and piano.

As of November 2016, it was announced all four volumes would be made available in a box set on the Grand Piano label of Naxos Records, with a scheduled release in January 2017.

=== Work on Paul Bowles ===
Paul Bowles was an American expatriate composer, author, and translator. His musical studies began with Aaron Copland. Subsequently, he pursued further instruction with Virgil Thomson. However, critical success for his first novel, The Sheltering Sky (1949), relegated Bowles' earlier musical efforts to relative obscurity.

Only in the decade before his death was there a revival of interest in Bowles' music. In 2016 the Invencia Piano Duo, once more in partnership with Naxos Records, released two CDs of Bowles' complete works for piano.

Volume one begins with works influenced by Latin American themes, grounded in the composer's affinity for the culture and his fluency in the Spanish language. The second of the two volumes closes with arrangements of Blue Mountain Ballads (1946), arranged for piano duet by Andrey Kasparov, and three miscellaneous pieces, set for two pianos by the American piano duo of Arthur Gold and Robert Fizdale. The latter three arrangements were discovered in the Gold and Fizdale Collection, held in the Peter Jay Sharp Special Collections, Lila Acheson Wallace Library, The Juilliard School. Kasparov restored the original manuscripts which enabled these duets to be recorded for the very first time.

== Awards ==
- Third Prize, All-USSR Composition Competition (1985).
- Second Prize, All-USSR Composition Competition (1987).
- Second Prize, Prokofiev International Composers Competition (1997).
- Albert Roussel Prize, Orléans International Piano Competition for 20th-Century Music (1998).
- Plus Award, ASCAP (1999–2011, 2013, 2015).
- Prize-Winner, Contemporary Record Society National Competition for Composers.

== Compositions ==
=== Original works ===
- Toccata for piano (1983).
- Six Aphorisms for flute, violin and cello (1987).
- Piano Sonata No. 1 based on Armenian sharakans (1988).
- Symphony of Three Cycles for symphony orchestra (1988–1989).
- Three Prayers for string quartet (1993; revised 1998).
- Piano Sonata No. 2 (1994).
- Perestroika for orchestra (1998).

From 1998, the composition features an orchestra that retunes sans order, and, before a final collapse, changes its seating. The crowd's roar is imitated by the speech of the musicians, where words borrowed from the lexicon of political prisoners and Russian euphemisms, with usage of extended vocabulary, are vocalised. Included are musical quotations from the 1930s, La Marseillaise, and the Hymn of the USSR.

- Nocturne for bassoon, harp, piano and double bass (1998).
- Michal for solo clarinet (2000).
- Variations on a Theme by Mark Schultz for horn and piano (2001).
- Fantasy on Lutheran Chorales for piano four hands (2004).
- Iao for modern dance, mezzo-soprano and percussion (2005).
- Tsitsernakabert for modern dance and six musicians: alto flute, bass/ contrabass flute, violin, two percussionists, and mezzo-soprano (2008).

Reflective of the composer's Armenian heritage, the work was inspired by the eponymous memorial, which is dedicated to the victims of the Armenian Genocide, the collective atrocities committed during WWI by the Ottoman Empire against Turkey's Armenian population. Situated in Yerevan, capital of Armenia, the monument was designed by the architects Sashur Kalashyan and Arthur Tarkhanyan.

- Ave Maris Stella for bass recorder, great bass recorder and bass viola da gamba (2010).

From 2011, the work is based on the liturgical hymn, Ave Maris Stella (Hail Star of the Sea), by Guillaume Dufay.

- Cadenza for LvB for solo piano (2010–2011); version for piano duo (2015).

The composition is based on select harmonic and melodic excerpts from Beethoven's Piano Trio No. 3 in C minor, Op. 1.

- Rhapsody on Hassidic Tunes for solo violin (2012).
- Lorca, operatic cycle in 5 parts; libretto by Christopher Sawyer-Lauçanno.
  - Part I (2015)

=== Arrangements ===
- The Lord is Sun and Shield from Gott der Herr ist Sonn und Schild, BWV 79, J.S. Bach (1685–1750); arranged for piano duet and organ duet (2007).
- La valse, Maurice Ravel (1875–1937); arranged for piano four hands (2008).
- Oblivion, Astor Piazzolla (1921–1992); arranged for solo piano (2012).
- Totentanz, Franz Liszt (1811–1886); arranged for two pianos (2014).
- Mes de Mayo, Baby, Baby, April Fool Baby, Paul Bowles (1910–1999); arranged for piano duet (2014).
- Blue Mountain Ballads, Paul Bowles (1910–1999); arranged for piano duet (2014).
- Books 1 and 2 of Iberia, Isaac Albéniz (1860–1909); arranged for piano duo (2015).
- Divertissement from The Nutcracker, Pyotr Tchaikovsky (1840–1893); arranged for piano duet (2016).
- Vers la flamme, Alexander Scriabin (1872–1915); arranged for piano duo (2018).
- Main Theme from Darling Lili, Henry Mancini (1924–1994) & Johnny Mercer (1909–1976); arranged for symphonic wind ensemble (2018).
- Le bal masqué, Francis Poulenc (1899–1963); arranged for piano duo, percussion and baritone (2020).
- Pastoral Sinfonia from the Christmas Oratorio, BWV 248, J.S. Bach (1685–1750); arranged for piano duo (2020).

== Selected discography ==
=== As composer ===
- Vienna Modern Masters:
  - On and Off the Keys: Music for Solo Instruments and Small Ensemble, Distinguished Performers Series IV (Andrey Kasparov, Piano Sonata No. 2)
  - Twentieth Century Classics: Music for Piano and Strings, Distinguished Performers Series III (Andrey Kasparov, Toccata for piano)
  - Music from Six Continents (1999 Series) (Andrey Kasparov, Perestroika for orchestra)
- Contemporary Record Society:
  - Four Paintings: Contemporary American Composers (Andrey Kasparov, Toccata for piano)
- Atlantic Music Artist Agency:
  - New Music in Ukraine, Chamber Ensemble (4) (Andrey Kasparov, Michal for solo clarinet)

=== As performer ===
Columbus Indiana Philharmonic

- Rachmaninoff by Kasparov. Sergei Rachmaninoff: Piano Concerto No. 2, Op. 18; Sergei Rachmaninoff/ Franz Behr, Polka de W.R. (Encore)

Albany Records

- Hommages Musicaux. Two collections of compositions honouring the memories of Claude Debussy and Gabriel Fauré (Invencia Piano Duo):

Tombeau de Claude Debussy
1. Paul Dukas, La plainte, au loin, du faune
2. Albert Roussel, L'Accueil des Muses
3. Gian Francesco Malipiero, A Claudio Debussy
4. Eugene Goossens, Hommage à Debussy
5. Béla Bartók, Improvisation on a Hungarian Peasant Song
6. Florent Schmitt, Et Pan, au fond des blés lunaires, s'accouda
7. Igor Stravinsky, Fragment des Symphonies pour instruments à vent à la mémoire de C.A. Debussy
8. Maurice Ravel, Duo pour Violine et Violoncelle (Desirée Ruhstrat, Violin; David Cunliffe, Cello)
9. Manuel de Falla, Homenaja (Timothy Olbrych, Guitar)
10. Erik Satie, Que me font ses vallon (Lisa Coston, Mezzo-Soprano)
Hommage à Gabriel Fauré, Seven Pieces on the Name of Fauré (Berceuse sur le nom de Gabriel Fauré)
1. Maurice Ravel (Pavel Ilyashov, Violin)
2. George Enescu
3. Louis Aubert
4. Florent Schmitt
5. Charles Koechlin
6. Paul Ladmirault
7. Jean Roger-Ducasse

- Ignis Fatuus. Works by Adolphus Hailstork (Invencia Piano Duo):

1. Two Scherzos
2. Trio Sonata
3. Ignis Fatuus
4. Eight Variations on "Shalom chaverim"
5. Piano Sonata No. 2
6. Sonata for Two Pianos

Naxos Records

- Paul Bowles: Complete Piano Works – Vol. 1

1. Huapango No. 1
2. Iquitos, Tierra Mojada
3. Guayanilla
4. Huapango No. 2, El Sol
5. 2 Portraits
6. Portrait of 5
7. Souvenir: A Portrait of Paul Bowles
8. 7 Anniversaries: No. 4. For Paul Bowles
9. La Cuelga
10. Constance Askew in the Garden
11. Folk Preludes
12. Apotheosis: A Dance for Welland Lathrop
13. The Wind Remains: Dance
14. Pastorela: El Indio
15. 6 Preludes
16. Mes de Mayo
17. April Fool Baby
18. On Whitman Avenue: Sleeping Song/ Baby, Baby
19. Sonata for 2 Pianos

- Paul Bowles: Complete Piano Works – Vol. 2

1. Night Waltz
2. Nocturne
3. Cross Country
4. Impasse de Tombouctou
5. Café Sin Nombre
6. Theseus and Maldoror
7. Carretera de Estepona
8. Sonatina Fragmentaria
9. 4 Miniatures
10. El Bejuco
11. Orosí
12. Sayula
13. Tamanar
14. Piano Sonatina
15. Blue Mountain Ballads
16. Colloque Sentimental
17. Pastorela: Caminata
18. Turkey Trot

- Florent Schmitt: Complete Original Works for Piano Duet and Duo – Vol. 1 (Invencia Piano Duo)

1. Trois rapsodies, Op. 53
2. Sept pièces, Op. 15
3. Rhapsodie parisienne

- Florent Schmitt: Complete Original Works for Piano Duet and Duo – Vol. 2 (Invencia Piano Duo)

1. Sur cinq notes, Op. 34
2. Reflets d'Allemagne, Op. 28
3. Eight Easy Pieces, Op. 41

- Florent Schmitt: Complete Original Works for Piano Duet and Duo – Vol. 3 (Invencia Piano Duo)

1. Marche du 163 R.I., Op. 48, No. 2
2. Feuillets de voyage, Book 1, Op. 26
3. Feuillets de voyage, Book 2, Op. 26
4. Musiques foraines, Op. 22

- Florent Schmitt: Complete Original Works for Piano Duet and Duo – Vol. 4 (Invencia Piano Duo)

1. Humoresques, Op. 43
2. Lied et scherzo, Op. 54 (for piano four hands)
3. Trois pièces récréatives, Op. 37
4. Le Petit Elfe Ferme-l'œil, Op. 58
