= Lutsyshyn =

Lutsyshyn is a surname. Notable people with the surname include:

- Oksana Lutsyshyn (born 1964), Ukrainian-American recording artist, pianist, and professor
- Roman Lutsyshyn (born 1994), Ukrainian track cyclist
