= Piano Quintet (Schmitt) =

Piano quintet by Florent Schmitt

- by Florent Schmitt
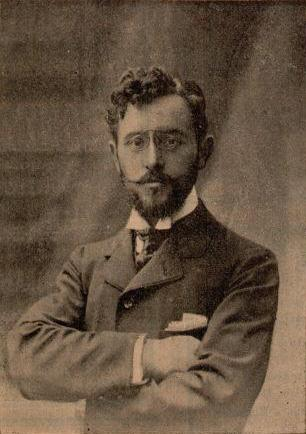
- The composer in 1900
- Native name: Quintette pour piano et cordes
- Key: B minor
- Opus: 51
- Year: 1908
- Form: Piano quintet
- Duration: 57 minutes approximately
- Movements: 3
- Scoring: Two violins, viola, cello, and piano

Premiere
- Date: March 26, 1909; 117 years ago
- Location: Cercle musical, Paris
- Performers: Firmin Touche String Quartet; Maurice Dumesnil

Florent Schmitt composed his Piano Quintet in B minor, Op. 51 over a period of six years, between 1902 and 1908. Nearly an hour in duration, it is the composer's longest chamber music composition.

== Background ==
Schmitt wrote three large-scale works for string ensemble: the Piano Quintet, Op. 51, the Piano Trio, Op. 105, and the String Quartet, Op. 112. The Piano Quintet, the earliest of the three, was begun in 1902 and completed in 1908, as he was also preparing La tragédie de Salomé (1910), whereas the other two works date from the 1940s.

It was premiered at the Cercle musical in Paris on March 26, 1909, followed by another important performance the next day, March 27, at a concert organized by the Société nationale de musique. The premiere was given by the Firmin Touche String Quartet with Maurice Dumesnil at the piano. The quintet is dedicated to Schmitt’s teacher and mentor, Gabriel Fauré, and was published in Paris in 1910 by A. Z. Mathot (now Éditions Salabert). After its premiere in France, the Quintet was one of the first compositions by Florent Schmitt to be performed abroad. The English premiere took place in January 1911, with Dumesnil alongside the Parisian Quartet.

The Quintet was also frequently performed in the United States. Its American premiere took place at a private concert hosted by the Society of the Friends of Music at the Ritz-Carlton Hotel in New York on February 1, 1914. The performers were violinists Edouard Dethier and Davol Sanders, violist Samuel Lifschey, cellist Paul Kefer, and pianist Gaston Dethier. The West Coast saw its first performance during the 1916–1917 season of the San Francisco Chamber Music Society, with Louis Persinger and Louis Ford (violins), Natha Firestone (viola), Horace Britt (cello), and Gyula Ormay (piano). Chicago hosted the Midwestern premiere in April 1928 at Kimball Hall, performed by the Gordon String Quartet with pianist Rudolph Reuter.

Schmitt performed the work frequently in the following years. He toured the UK as early as December 1916, in the midst of World War I, playing the piano part of the Quintet, and continued to do so until the 1930s, when it began to be performed less frequently there. In the 1940s, Kathleen Long took over the piano part. Another notable performance was given at the Mahler Festival 1920 in Amsterdam on May 16, 1920, organized by Willem Mengelberg, where he played the piano part with the Het Hollandsche Strijkkwartet. After Schmitt left the UK, he began performing in the United States. In 1932, he played the piece at New York City’s Town Hall, beginning an all-American tour that concluded the following year.

== Structure ==
The Quintet is scored for a typical ensemble made up of a violin, a viola, and a piano. A large-scale chamber composition, it is around 57 minutes long. The movement list is as follows:

1. Lent et grave - Le double plus vite - Animé - = . précédente - 1^{er} mouv^{t} - = . précédente
2. Lent - Un peu plus lent - Mouv^{t} initial
3. Animé - Lent - Animé - Pas trop vite - Lent - Assez modéré - Pas trop vite - Assez modéré - Lent - Très lent - Animez davantage - Plus animé

== Recordings ==
The Quintet was not recorded in full by the composer during his lifetime. Schmitt recorded the second movement with Pathé-Marconi on June 12, 1935. The recording took place in Paris, with the composer playing the piano part alongside the Calvet Quartet, then comprising Joseph Calvet and Daniel Guilevitch (violins), Léon Pascal (viola), and Paul Mas (cello). The recording was later reissued by Columbia Masterworks and EMI Classics. The complete work, however, was not recorded until 1956. The following is a list of complete recordings of the Quintet:

Recordings of Florent Schmitt's Piano Quintet in B minor, Op. 51
| String quartet | Piano | Date of recording | Place of recording | Label |
|---|---|---|---|---|
| Loewenguth Quartet | Jean Doyen | 1956 | — | St-Laurent |
| Berne Quartet | Werner Bärtschi | August 1981 | Thun, Switzerland | Accord |
| Berlin Soloists Ensemble | Birgitta Wollenweber | April 2008 | Villa Siemens, Berlin, Germany | Naxos |
| Quatuor Stanislas | Christian Ivaldi | July 2008 | Auditorium du Conservatoire Régional du Grand Nancy, Nancy, France | Timpani |

== Reception ==
=== Contemporary reception ===
According to musicologist Caroline Waight, the Piano Quintet was well received by contemporary critics and audiences, and helped Schmitt establish himself as a major composer on the international music scene. The composition was awarded First Prize at the 1909 Société des compositeurs de musique competition, an award that was given along with a payment of 500 francs to the composer.

French composer and music critic Albert Groz attended the premiere and published a positive review in La Tribune de Saint-Gervais, a publication of the Schola Cantorum: “Despite its enormous proportions, there is nothing in M. Schmitt’s Quintet that is long or tiring. The construction, through its logic and solidity, constantly holds the interest, prevents it from getting lost among the episodes and denotes in its composer a power of conception that is rarely encountered.” Author and critic Paul Landormy also wrote a positive review and likened the beginning of the work to César Franck's Piano Quintet: "I would be happy to hear this undeniably sincere and strong composition again in order to calibrate the true merit of the reservations that I’ve noted, without having been able to read the score either before or after the concert. I’ll add that the Touche Quartet and M. Dumesnil were excellent in their performance." Other notable admirers of the piece include the English composer Kaikhosru Shapurji Sorabji, who wrote: “I do not know any chamber work to compare with this great quintet. [...] On the one occasion in eight years that I have had the pleasure of hearing this beautiful work (at South Place), it was enthusiastically received.”

=== American reception ===
Reviews across the Atlantic were also enthusiastic. A review in The New York Sun, published on February 2, 1914, stated: “The impression [...] was that this is a very important and significant piece of chamber music and that it should be heard again and again. [...] Such music cannot be grasped by an indolent listener.” In Musical America (February 6, 1915), it was written: “Mr. Schmitt has written a noble work. [...] The work has a pronounced individuality and should be performed frequently.” The Musical Courier (February 3, 1915) similarly noted: “It is undoubtedly one of the most valuable contributions to chamber music literature that has been made in recent years, and should be heard frequently.”

The second time the piece was presented in San Francisco, in October 1921, it became the best-attended chamber music event there, performed before a capacity audience of more than 1,000 people, as reported by the Pacific Coast Music Review. In The New York Times, the critic Olin Downes wrote on November 28, 1932: “The Quintet [...] is virtually a quarter of a century old, but last night an audience of modernists applauded it to the echo and found it good and significant and stimulating.”

=== Recent reception ===
Current reviews have also been very positive. Caroline Waight highlighted its "wealth of melody" and thought of the piece as "orchestral in score". Similarly, musicologist Michel Fleury considered the Piano Quintet to be the "absolute apex" in the progression of French piano quintet history and praised "its luxuriant harmony, its rhythmic dynamism, and its melodic profusion." Music journalist and critic Julian Haylock also wrote these words for the January 2009 issue of The Strad magazine: "Schmitt was not given to wearing his heart on his sleeve, which lends his music a noble sense of proportion during even the most heated of climaxes. At the same time, he was prone to generous washes of the kind of exotic, chromatically intensified harmonies."
