= La tragédie de Salomé =

Ballet in two acts and seven tableaux

La tragédie de Salome
- Ballet and symphonic suite by Florent Schmitt
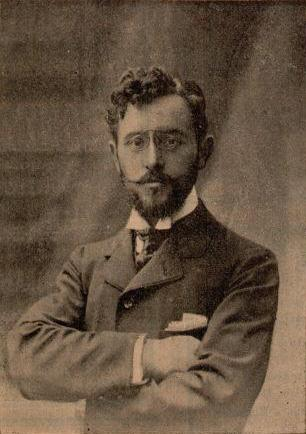
- The composer in 1900
- Opus: 50
- Year: 1907 (Ballet); Revised 1910 (Symphonic suite)
- Duration: 60 minutes approximately 30 minutes approximately (Revised version)
- Scoring: Chamber ensemble and solo voice (Ballet); Orchestra and female chorus (Symphonic suite)

Premiere
- Date: Ballet: November 9, 1907; 119 years ago Suite: January 8, 1911; 115 years ago

La tragédie de Salomé, Op. 50 (from French, "The Tragedy of Salomé"), is a ballet in two acts and seven tableaux, set to music by Florent Schmitt in 1907, based on a poem by Robert d'Humières. The original drame muet (unsung opera) was later adapted into a symphonic suite in 1910, a concert version for large orchestra whose duration is roughly half that of the original. The symphonic suite is the version most commonly performed and discussed today.

== Ballet ==
The origins of La tragédie as a ballet can be traced back to the period of time when Schmitt left his residence at the Villa Medici in Rome, where he had been living for the previous four years, to embark on a journey around the Islamic countries surrounding the Mediterranean. He was particularly influenced by Turkey, which he visited in November 1903, and took part in the Friday Selamlık procession, a weekly event where the Sultan would go in a grand procession to the mosque with crowds cheering loudly as he appeared. Schmitt used his inspiration from the powerful shouting and excitement and transferred it into his Psalm XLVII (1906), imagining the people of Israel praising Yahweh with the same enthusiasm. This piece gave the composer recognition in the critical and intellectual circles of Paris when he returned.

While on holiday in the Pyrenees in late August 1907, Florent Schmitt received a letter from his friend Jean Forestier suggesting that he contact Robert d'Humières. D’Humières had heard Schmitt’s Psalm a few months earlier at the Conservatoire and wanted him to compose the music for a Salome he was preparing with Loïe Fuller. La Tragédie was written over the following two months, in September and October 1907, and was finished in Argelès-en-Rigorre. However, Schmitt, known for his rich and colorful orchestration, was forced to significantly reduce the size of the ensemble, as the Théâtre des Arts in Paris, where the work was to be premiered, was too small to accommodate a full orchestra. The final scoring involved only around twenty players, far fewer than a standard orchestra. Since Parisian audiences had recently heard the lush and expansive orchestration of Richard Strauss’s Salome (1905), Schmitt had to find ways to achieve a powerful and effective sound with a relatively small ensemble.

Unlike many other interpretations of Salome, Robert d'Humières did not focus on a single dance scene, but on a series of dances, each revealing different aspects of Salome’s personality. His departure from Oscar Wilde's, Jules Massenet's and Richard Strauss's versions of Salome is an attempt to give the work a more symbolic and moral dimension. In Schmitt’s version, Salome is not in love with John the Baptist; rather, she is portrayed as an obedient young woman who dances at her mother’s request, not out of any desire for the prophet’s death.

The ballet premiered at the Théâtre des Arts in Paris on November 9, 1907, and became successful almost immediately. It ran for more than 50 performances and became one of the main artistic events of the Paris season, conducted by Désiré-Emile Inghelbrecht and starring Loie Fuller. Its success led to the creation of a symphonic suite, an abridged version of the work for a large orchestra, which subsequently formed the basis of the version prepared for Sergei Diaghilev’s Ballets Russes in 1913, in which Tamara Karsavina performed the title role. The ballet, choreographed by Boris Romanov, with decor and costume designs by Serge Soudeikin and conducted by Pierre Monteux, ran for 26 performances over the season. It has been produced many times over the years until the present day. The ballet score was likely never published and was kept as a working document for performances.

=== Structure ===
The ballet is structured into two acts and seven scenes (or tableaux). It has an approximate duration of 60 minutes. It is scored for a reduced ensemble resembling a chamber orchestra, together with an off-stage female voice. The ensemble comprises a flute (doubling piccolo), an oboe (doubling English horn), a clarinet, a bassoon, two horns in F, a trumpet in C, two trombones, and a percussion section including timpani, bass drum, cymbals, tam-tam, tambourine, and triangle, as well as a harp and a string quintet.

== Symphonic suite ==
The original ballet score underwent a thorough revision to be released as a symphonic suite for large orchestra based on three of the original six dances featured in the ballet. The revised version was composed between 1909 and 1910. The suite premiered on January 8, 1911, at the Concerts Colonne under the direction of Gabriel Pierné. It was dedicated to Igor Stravinsky, also a member of Les Apaches, who acknowledged the dedication in the following terms:

Quand est-ce que votre géniale Salomé paraîtra enfin […] ? Je dois avouer que c’est la plus grande joie qu’une œuvre d’art m’ait causée depuis longtemps. […] Croyez-moi, je suis bien fier qu’elle me soit dédiée.

[When will your brilliant Salomé finally appear […] ? I must confess that it has given me the greatest joy I have felt from a work of art in a long time. […] Believe me, I am very proud that it is dedicated to me.]

— Igor Stravinsky

As time went on, Igor Stravinsky’s attitude toward La Tragédie de Salomé and toward Florent Schmitt himself deteriorated. Although Stravinsky had written in February 1913 that “Debussy, Ravel, and Florent Schmitt [are] the foremost musicians of the day,” his opinion later shifted, partly because of Schmitt’s tarnished reputation in the 1930s due to his pro-German and pro-Vichy sympathies. In addition, Stravinsky’s turn to neoclassicism led him to regard Schmitt’s neoromantic style as reactionary. Their relationship was further strained by personal rivalry, notably when Schmitt was elected on January 25, 1936, to the Académie des Beaux-Arts (composition section, seat formerly held by Paul Dukas), a division of the Institut de France, instead of Stravinsky. Musicologist Robert Craft later observed that Stravinsky’s final opinion of Schmitt’s music was “unprintable.”

The symphonic suite was published in 1912 by Éditions Durand in Paris.

=== Structure ===
The suite is scored for a large orchestra and a women's chorus. The orchestra is meant to be made up of two flutes, a piccolo, two oboes, an English horn, two clarinets, a bass clarinet, three bassoons, a sarrusophone, four French horns in F, three trumpets in C, three trombones, a tuba, a percussion section consisting of timpani, a side drum, a triangle, cymbals, a bass drum, a tam tam, a glockenspiel, and a celesta, and then two harps and a string quintet, even though it is customary to use a standard string section. It is structured as follows:

Structure of Florent Schmitt's La tragédie de Salome, Op. 50
Part	Section	Tempo marking	Rehearsal number
I	Prélude	Lent - Animez un peu - Animez encore - Mouv^{t} de [3] - Calme	Beginning
I	Danse des perles	Assez vif - Un peu moins vif	[11]
II	—	Lent	[32]
II	Les enchantements sur la mer	Un peu moins lent - Animez un peu - Plus lent - Animez toujours	[34]
II	Danse des éclairs	Animé, sans exagération - Lent - Animé - Lent - Animé - Lent	[50]
II	Danse de l'effroi	Animé	[62]

== Recordings ==
La tragédie de Salome has been recorded more than twenty times. The following is an incomplete list of recordings of La tragédie de Salome:

Recordings of Florent Schmitt's La tragédie de Salome, Op. 50
Version	Conductor	Orchestra	Chorus	Date of recording	Place of recording	Label
Suite	Florent Schmitt	Walther Straram Concerts Orchestra	—	April 1930	Théâtre des Champs-Élysées, Paris, France	Pathé / Columbia / EMI Classics
Ballet	Patrick Davin	Rheinland-Pfalz Philharmonic	Marie-Paule Fayt (Solo)	December 1991	Pfalzbau-Hall, Ludwigshafen, Germany	Marco Polo
Suite	Thierry Fischer	BBC National Orchestra of Wales	BBC National Chorus of Wales	October 2006	Brangwyn Hall, Guildhall, Swansea, Wales, UK	Hyperion
Suite	Sylvain Cambreling	South West German Radio Symphony Orchestra	SWR Vokalensemble Stuttgart	December 2007	—	Hännsler
Suite	Yan Pascal Tortelier	São Paulo Symphony Orchestra	Sao Paulo Symphony Orchestra Choir	July 2010	Sala São Paulo, Júlio Prestes Cultural Center, São Paulo, Brasil	Chandos
Suite	JoAnn Falletta	Buffalo Philharmonic Orchestra	Women's Choir of Buffalo	March 2020	Kleinhans Music Hall, Buffalo, New York, USA	Naxos
