= François-René Tranchefort =

French musicologist (died 2019)

François-René Tranchefort (30 June 1933 – 22 May 2019) was a contemporary French musicologist.

== Biography ==
Tranchefort has written, edited or directed, alone or in collaboration with other musicologists, a number of reference works on a wide range of themes related to classical music: chamber music, symphonic music, piano, harpsichord, opera, sacred music, choral, and musical instruments. Among others, he has collaborated with Harry Halbreich, Marc Vignal, Pierre-Émile Barbier, Adélaïde de Place, André Lischke, Jean-Alexandre Ménétrier, Alain Poirier, Jean-Louis Sulmon, Claire Delamarche, Michel Fleury, Erik Kocevar, Marie-Aude Roux, and Michel Parouty.

== Selected bibliography ==
- 1978: L'opéra 1, d'Orféo à Tristan, series "Points", éditions du Seuil
- 1978: L'opéra 2, de Tristan à nos jours, series Points, éditions du Seuil
- 1980: Les instruments de musique dans le monde 1, Coll. « Points » (n° Mu 5), éditions du Seuil. Instruments de percussions, cordes.
- 1980: Les instruments de musique dans le monde 2, series "Points" (n° Mu 6), éditions du Seuil. Instruments à vent, électriques et électroniques mécaniques et automatiques.
- 1983: L'Opéra, éditions du Seuil.
- François-René Tranchefort (dir.) (1986). Guide de la musique symphonique. Les Indispensables de la musique (in French). Paris: Fayard. ISBN 2-213-01638-0. Tranchefort1986. — Prize of the Académie Charles-Cros.
- Guide de la musique de piano et de clavecin. Les Indispensables de la musique (in French). Paris: Fayard. 1987. p. 867. ISBN 978-2-213-01639-9. OCLC 17967083. Tranchefort1987.
- Guide de la musique de chambre. Les Indispensables de la musique (in French). Paris: Fayard. 1987. p. 538. ISBN 2-213-02403-0. OCLC 21318922. Tranchefort1989.
- François-René Tranchefort (dir.) (1993). Guide de la musique sacrée et chorale, de 1750 à nos jours. Les Indispensables de la musique (in French). Paris: Fayard. p. 1176. ISBN 2-213-02254-2. OCLC 55957611. Tranchefort1993.
