= Gustave Sandré =

French composer (1842–1916)

Gustave Sandré (1843–1916) was a French composer. He was director of the Nancy Conservatoire in eastern France, where Florent Schmitt was one of his pupils. Most of his music scores were published around 1900 as supplements to the magazine L'Illustration.
