= Reflets d'Allemagne =

Cycle of eight piano pieces by Florent Schmitt

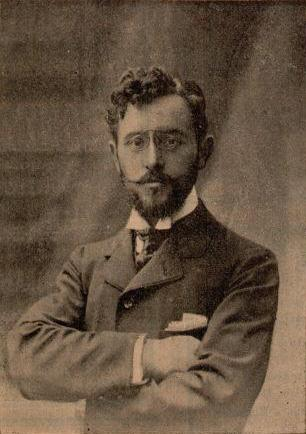
Florent Schmitt in 1900

Reflets d'Allemagne, Op. 28, is a cycle of eight piano pieces by Florent Schmitt. The original work exists in two versions: for piano 4-hands, and piano solo. Published in 1905, these waltzes were initially orchestrated for the concert and then incorporated into the music for a ballet given in 1932 at the Opéra-Comique. (Koblenz and Nuremberg)

== Structure ==
1. Heidelberg
2. Coblentz
3. Lübeck
4. Werder
5. Vienna
6. Dresden
7. Nuremberg
8. Munich

== Source ==
- François-René Tranchefort, éd.Fayard 1990, p. 646
