= Florent Schmitt =

French composer (1870–1958)

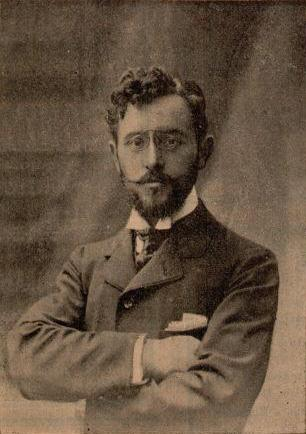
- Schmitt in 1900
- Born: 28 September 1870; Meurthe-et-Moselle, France
- Died: 17 August 1958; Neuilly-sur-Seine, France
- Occupation: Composer

Florent Schmitt (French pronunciation: [flɔʁã ʃmit]; 28 September 1870 – 17 August 1958) was a French composer. He was part of the group known as Les Apaches. His most famous pieces are La tragédie de Salome and Psaume XLVII (Psalm 47). He has been described as "one of the most fascinating of France's lesser-known classical composers".

== Biography ==
=== Early life and career ===
Born in Meurthe-et-Moselle, Schmitt took music lessons in Nancy with the local composer Gustave Sandré. At the age of 19 he entered the Paris Conservatoire, where he studied with Gabriel Fauré, Jules Massenet, Théodore Dubois, and Albert Lavignac. In 1900 he won the Prix de Rome. During the 1890s he became friendly with Frederick Delius, who was living in Paris at the time, and Schmitt prepared vocal scores for four of Delius's operas: Irmelin, The Magic Fountain, Koanga and A Village Romeo and Juliet.

From 1929 to 1939 Schmitt worked as a music critic for Le Temps, where he proved controversial. He was known to shout out his views from his seat in the hall. The music publisher Heugel called him "an irresponsible lunatic". In November 1933, at a concert that included music by Kurt Weill, who had just been forced to leave Germany and was present, Schmitt led a group in shouting "Vive Hitler!", as reported by a communist journal.

=== Later life ===
Though he was one of the most often performed French composers during the first four decades of the 20th century, and though he never stopped composing, Schmitt's works fell into comparative neglect. In 1952 he was admitted to the Légion d'honneur. He became the subject of attacks—both in his last years and posthumously—because of his sympathies towards the actions of the Nazi party in the early 1930s and over his willingness to work for the Vichy regime in the 1940s, as had other eminent French musicians, notably Alfred Cortot and Joseph Canteloube.

Schmitt's early career was later re-examined in association with Sir Thomas Beecham's biography of English composer Frederick Delius. Beecham had known Delius in his Paris days—the friend of August Strindberg, Paul Gauguin, Edvard Munch and other figures of the time.

Assisting Sir Thomas Beecham, Felix Aprahamian identified Florent Schmitt as one of Delius's few French musician-friends. Schmitt was probably the last to remember Le grand Anglais of the Latin Quarter, as Delius had been known.

In 1956, Aprahamian arranged for Schmitt to meet Sir Thomas in England. On the occasion of his visit, Ralph Vaughan Williams telephoned to say that he had not met Florent Schmitt since before the First World War, when he had been a pupil of Ravel's in Paris, and would like to see him. This precipitated a reunion of the two composers after a half-century. Afterwards, Schmitt travelled with Aprahamian to the Abbey Road Studios where Sir Thomas was then engaged in a recording project.

Although it had been his express wish to interview him, all Sir Thomas could do was to greet Schmitt briefly, shake him by the hand, and pass on down the corridor. Schmitt brushed off the encounter casually saying, "Il était toujours un homme curieux. (He was always a curious man.)" Two years later, when Aprahamian saw Schmitt again, at the 1958 Strasbourg Music Festival, he (Schmitt) was already seriously ill. He had journeyed there only to hear Charles Munch conduct the premiere of his Second Symphony. A few months later Schmitt died in Neuilly-sur-Seine, aged 87.

Aprahamian's recollections of his encounters with Florent Schmitt were later included in his introduction to the revised edition (Severn House, 1975) of Beecham's biography of Frederick Delius (Hutchinson, 1959). This introduction was reprinted by the Delius Society on the 50th anniversary of Beecham's biography.

== Music ==
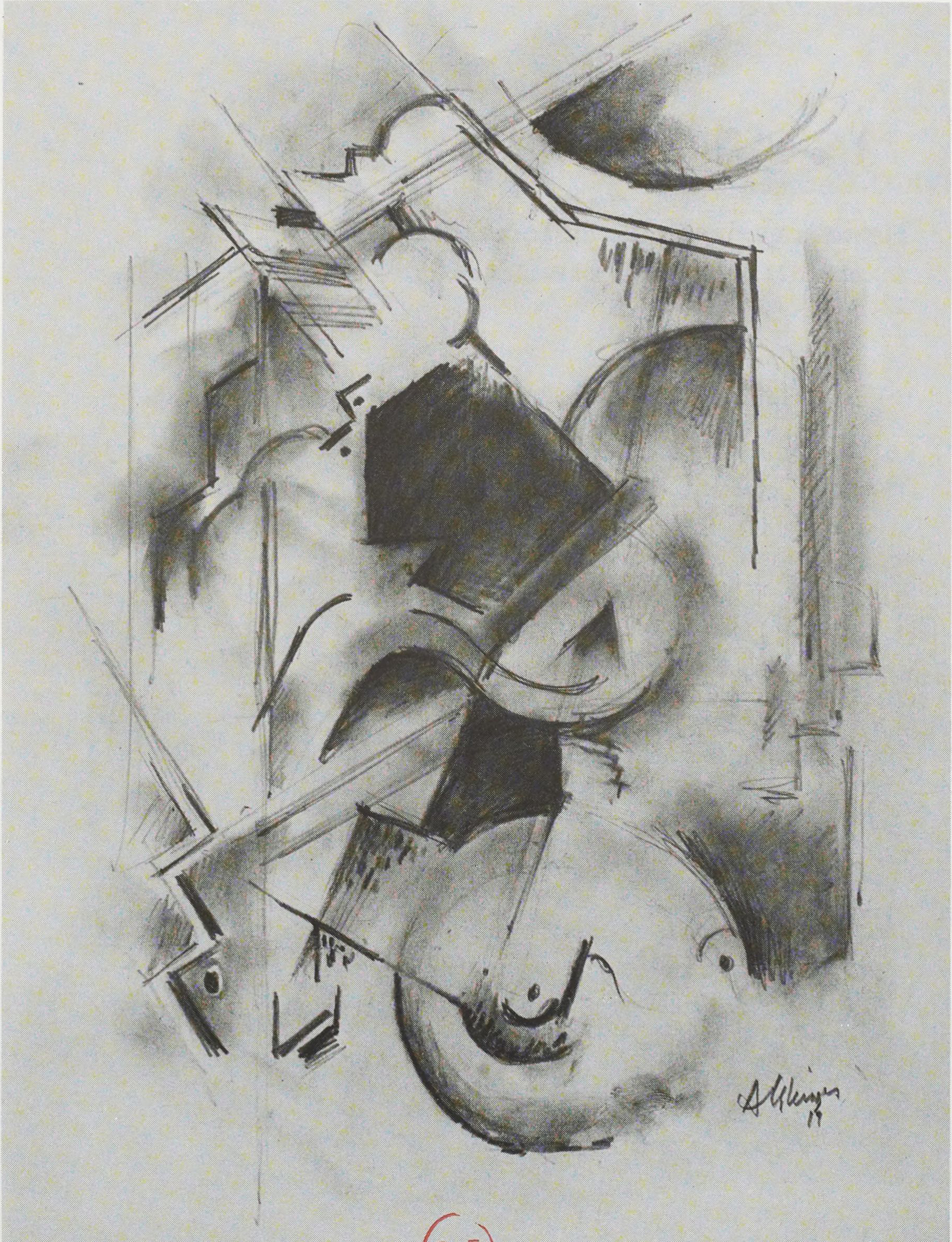
Albert Gleizes, 1914–15, Portrait de Florent Schmitt (Le Pianiste), pastel, 36 x 27 cm. Study for an oil on canvas titled Portrait de Florent Schmitt, 1914–15, 200 x 152 cm

Schmitt wrote 138 works with opus numbers. He composed examples of most of the major forms of music, except for opera. His Piano Quintet in B minor, written in 1908, helped establish his reputation. Other works include a violin sonata (Sonate Libre), a late string quartet, a saxophone quartet, Dionysiaques for wind band, two symphonies as well as several piano cycles such as Crépuscules, Ombres and Mirages.

He was part of the group known as Les Apaches. His own style, recognizably impressionistic, owed something to the example of Debussy, though it had distinct traces of Wagner and Richard Strauss also.

In 1907 Schmitt composed a ballet, La tragédie de Salomé, to a commission from Jacques Rouché for Loie Fuller and the Théâtre des Arts. The original ballet score required twenty instruments and lasted about an hour, In 1910 Schmitt prepared a suite using several of the ballet's movement, half as long as the ballet score, for a much expanded orchestra. The suite is much better-known, with recordings conducted by Schmitt himself, Paul Paray, Jean Martinon, Antonio de Almeida, Marek Janowski and others. There is also a recording of the 1907 original score under Patrick Davin on the Marco Polo label. The rhythmic syncopations, polyrhythms, percussively treated chords, bitonality, and scoring of Schmitt's work anticipate Stravinsky's The Rite of Spring. While composing The Rite of Spring, Stravinsky acknowledged that Schmitt's ballet gave him greater joy than any work he had heard in a long time, but the two composers fell out in later years, and Stravinsky reversed his opinion of Schmitt's works.

Schmitt was one of the ten French composers who each, in 1927, contributed a dance for the children's ballet L'éventail de Jeanne. Schmitt wrote the finale, a Kermesse-Valse.

Other works include the suite for orchestra "Oriane et le Prince d'Amour", Op. 83 bis (1934), the symphonic diptych to the memory of Gabriel Fauré "In Memoriam", Op. 72 (1937), the "Ronde Burlesque", Op. 78 (1927), the "Legende pour alto et orchestre", Op. 66 (1918), and the orchestral fresco "Anthony and Cleopatra" (1920).

The 1990s and 2000s witnessed a revival of his compositions, and an increased coverage of it on compact disc. Beginning in late 2012, the Invencia Piano Duo (Andrey Kasparov and Oksana Lutsyshyn), in collaboration with Naxos Records, on its Grand Piano series, released four CDs of Schmitt's complete duo-piano works. The collection includes Schmitt's Trois rapsodies, Op. 53, and the first recording of Schmitt's Sept pièces, Op. 15, composed in 1899. It also includes one of two unpublished duets by Schmitt, Rhapsodie parisienne (1900). As of November 2016, it was announced all four volumes would be made available in a box set, with a scheduled release in January 2017.

== Main works ==
=== Orchestral ===
- Three symphonies:
  - Symphonie concertante, Op. 82 for orchestra and piano
  - Second Symphony, Op. 137
  - Janiana symphony for strings, Op. 101
- La Tragédie de Salomé, symphonic suite, Op. 50 (1907)
- Antoine et Cléopâtre, Op. 69 (1919-20)
- Enfants, Op. 94
- Introït, récit et congé, Op. 113 for cello and orchestra (1949)
- Kermesse-Valse from L'éventail de Jeanne (1926)
- Le Palais Hanté [The Haunted Palace] (1904)
- Le Petit Elfe Ferme-l'œil, Op. 73
- Légende, Op. 66 for alto saxophone (or violin, or viola or alto) and orchestra
- Pupazzi, Op. 36
- Salammbô (film music)
- Salammbô (3 suites)

=== Chamber music ===
- Pour presque tous les temps for flute and piano trio, Op. 134
- Saxophone Quartet, Op. 102
- Flute Quartet, Op. 106
- String Quartet, Op. 112
- Piano Quintet in B minor, Op. 51 (1902–08)
- Sonata for violin and piano
- Trio sonatina for flute, clarinet and keyboard, Op. 85
- String trio, Op. 105
- Suite en rocaille, Op.84
- Suite for trumpet and piano, Op. 133
- Légende for alto saxophone and piano, Op. 66

=== Vocal ===
- Le chant de nuit for soloists, chorus and orchestra
- Mass for four voices and organ
- Psaume XLVII for soprano, chorus, organ and orchestra (1906)

=== Wind Band ===
- Dionysiaques, Op. 62 for military band (1913/25)

=== Ballets ===
- La Tragédie de Salomé, Op. 50 (1907)
- Oriane et le prince d'amour

=== Piano ===
- Reflets d'Allemagne, Op. 28 (1905)
- Musiques foraines, Op. 22
- Feuilles mortes, Op. 46
- Crépuscules, Op. 56
- Ombres, Op. 64
- Mirages, Op. 70
- Chaîne brisée, Op. 87
