= Georges Servières =

French musicologist and music critic

- Born: Georges Serrurier; 13 October 1858; Fréjus
- Died: 25 July 1937 (aged 78); Paris
- Occupations: Musicologist; Critic

Georges Servières (13 October 1858 – 25 July 1937) was a 19th/20th-century French musicologist and music critic.

== Books ==
- Richard Wagner jugé En France, Librairie Illustrée, 1890.
- Tannhäuser à l'Opéra en 1861, Paris, Fischbacher, 1895.
- Biographies of musicians appeared in collection « Les Musiciens Célèbres », Paris, Librairie Renouard /Henri Laurens, Éditeur :
  - Weber, biographie critique, illustrated with twelve reproductions inset, circa 1910.
  - Gabriel Fauré, 1930 illustrated with 12 engravings inset - Étude critique.
  - Édouard Lalo, s.d.
- Collection « Les Maîtres de la Musique », Paris, Librairie Félix Alcan,
  - Saint-Saëns, 1923
  - Emmanuel Chabrier 1841-1894, 1912.
- La Décoration artistique des buffets d'orgues, éd. G. Van Oest, Paris et Brussels, 1928.
- Cités d'Allemagne, Paris, Charpentier 1902.
- Dresden, Freiberg and Meissen, collection « Les villes d'art célèbres », 119 engravings, publisher H. Laurens, 1911 -
- L'Allemagne française sous Napoléon Ier, after unpublished documents from the national archives and the archives of Foreign Affairs, with an extendible chart inset of the annexed territories, Paris, Perrin et Cie, 1904. Text on Gallica
- Épisodes d'Histoire musicale, Paris, Librairie Fischbacher, 1914.
- Divers :
  - Rémiette., Paris, Ernest Kolb, s.d.
  - Roseline - Mœurs contemporaines, with 2 prints in sepia by Boutet, Paris, E. Giraud et Cie, 1885. Text on Gallica

== Articles ==
Georges Servières collaborated with numerous magazines including:

- Le Ménestrel,
- Le Guide musical,
- La Revue musicale,
- La Tribune de Saint-Gervais,
- La Gazette des Beaux-Arts,
- La Revue d'art dramatique.

== Translations ==
Georges Servières translated German opera librettos into French:

- Der Freischütz, three-act opera, music by Carl Maria von Weber, translation of the poem by Johann Friedrich Kind, preceded by a history of the work and its French adaptations, Fischbacher, Floury, Paris, 1913.
- Richard Wagner, Tannhäuser, composer's libretto.
