= Polka Italienne =

Composition for two pianos by Sergei Rachmaninoff

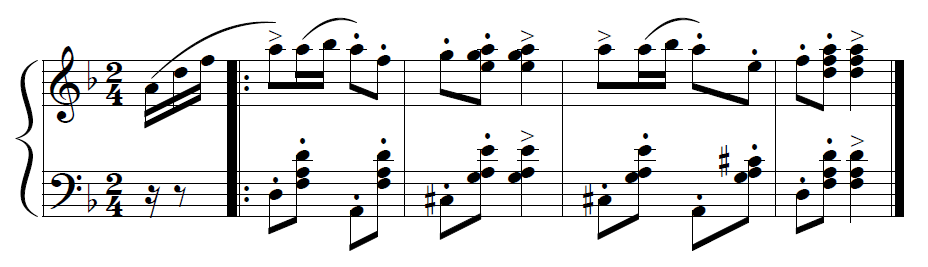
Opening of a solo arrangement of "Polka Italienne" by Alexander Siloti.

The Polka Italienne (Italian Polka) is a work for piano four hands by Sergei Rachmaninoff. It was composed in 1906. The piece begins in the key of E♭ minor then changes to E♭ major during the middle section.

Russian pianist Alexander Siloti transcribed the work as a simple arrangement for 2-hand piano. It was published in 1925 by Boosey & Hawkes. The transcription is transposed down to the key of D minor then changes to D major.

Russian classical pianist Vyacheslav Gryaznov arranged a concert transcription for solo piano in preparation for an upcoming tour of Italy in 1999 at the age of 17. Gryaznov recorded the arrangement on the Steinway & Sons label in 2018 and the arrangement was included in the 2015 Schott Music edition Gryaznov: Piano Transcriptions

== See also ==
- Polka de W.R.
