= Marc Vignal =

French musicologist

Marc Vignal (born 21 December 1933 in Nogent-sur-Marne) is a noted French musicologist, writer and radio producer for France Musique and program manager at Radio France (1975–99), a journalist for Harmony (1964–84), Le Monde de la musique (1985–2009) and Classica (2009–). He collaborated in the writing of Fayard Guides: symphonic, sacred, chamber and piano under the direction of François-René Tranchefort, including French and translated The Classical Style by Charles Rosen (Gallimard, 1978, repr. 2000), and Bach Interpretation by Paul Badura-Skoda (Buchet-Chastel 1999). Vignal is the author of numerous lectures, articles and books on music and musicians.

== Works ==
Selected works include:

- Joseph Haydn – Seghers 1964
- Jean Sibelius – Seghers 1965
- Mahler – The Threshold 1966, repr. 1995
- Dictionary of music under the direction of Marc Vignal 1982
- Dictionary of musicians under the direction of Marc Vignal – Larousse 1985
- Joseph Haydn, the man and his work – Fayard 1988
- Bach's son – Fayard 1997
- Joseph Haydn – First & Autobiography Biography, Translated and introduced by Marc Vignal Aubier-Flammarion 1997
- Haydn and Mozart – Fayard 2001
- Muzio Clementi – Fayard Mirare 2003
- Jean Sibelius – Fayard 2004
- Beethoven and Vienna – Fayard Mirare 2004
- Michael Haydn – Bleu Nuit 2009
- Antonio Salieri – Bleu Nuit 2014
