= Henry Prunières =

French music critic (1886–1942)

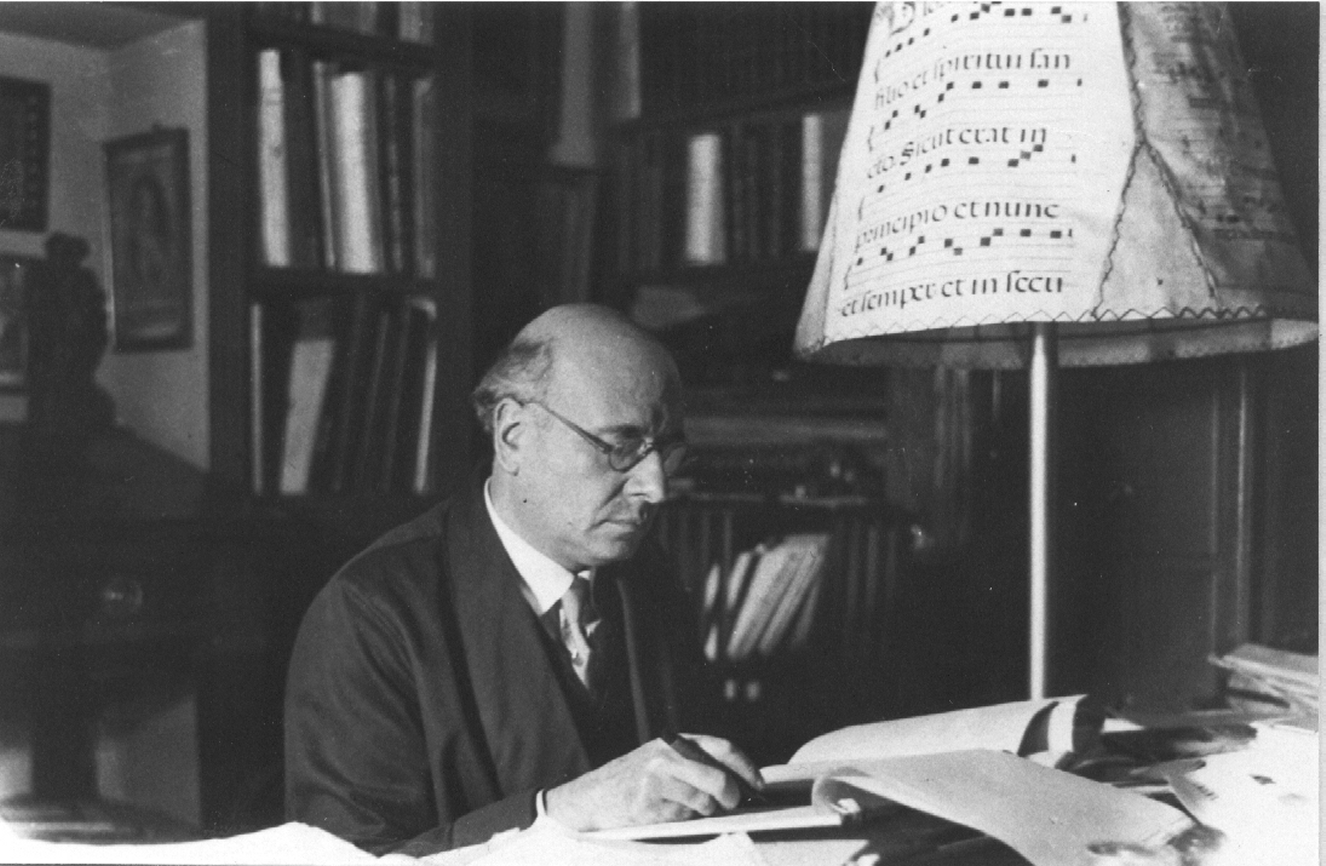
Henry Prunières in 1935

Henry Prunières (24 May 1886, in Paris – 11 April 1942, in Nanterre) was a French musicologist, and international proponent of contemporary art in various forms, including music, dance and painting. He occupies an important place in the art world between the wars, particularly with regard to music. His major contribution La Revue musicale, a monthly musical periodical which he founded in 1920 and left in 1939, is still a reference in the Western musical world.

Prunières received his doctorate at the Sorbonne in 1913, where he wrote his dissertations on Italian music in France before Jean-Baptiste Lully and ballet de cour in France before Lully. Between 1924 and 1935, he worked as the music correspondent at the New York Times. He was also secretary and chairman of the International Music Society. Prunières was an important figure in the early 20th-century renewal of interest in Lully and his music.

== Major works ==
- Lully. Paris, 1910
- La musique de la chambre et l'ecurie. Paris, 1912
- L'Opéra italien en France avant Lulli. Paris, 1913
- Le Ballet de cour en France avant Benserade et Lulli. Paris, 1913
- Claudio Monteverdi. Paris, 1924
- La vie et l'oeuvre de Claudio Monteverdi. Paris, 1924
- Le vie illustre et libertine de Jean-Baptiste Lully. Paris, 1929
- Cavalli et l'opera venitien au XVIIe siecle. Paris, 1931
- Nouvelle histoire de la musique. Paris, 1934–6
- J-B. Lully: Oeuvres completes. Paris, 1930–39, 10 vols.
