= Polka de W.R. =

Piano composition by Sergei Rachmaninoff

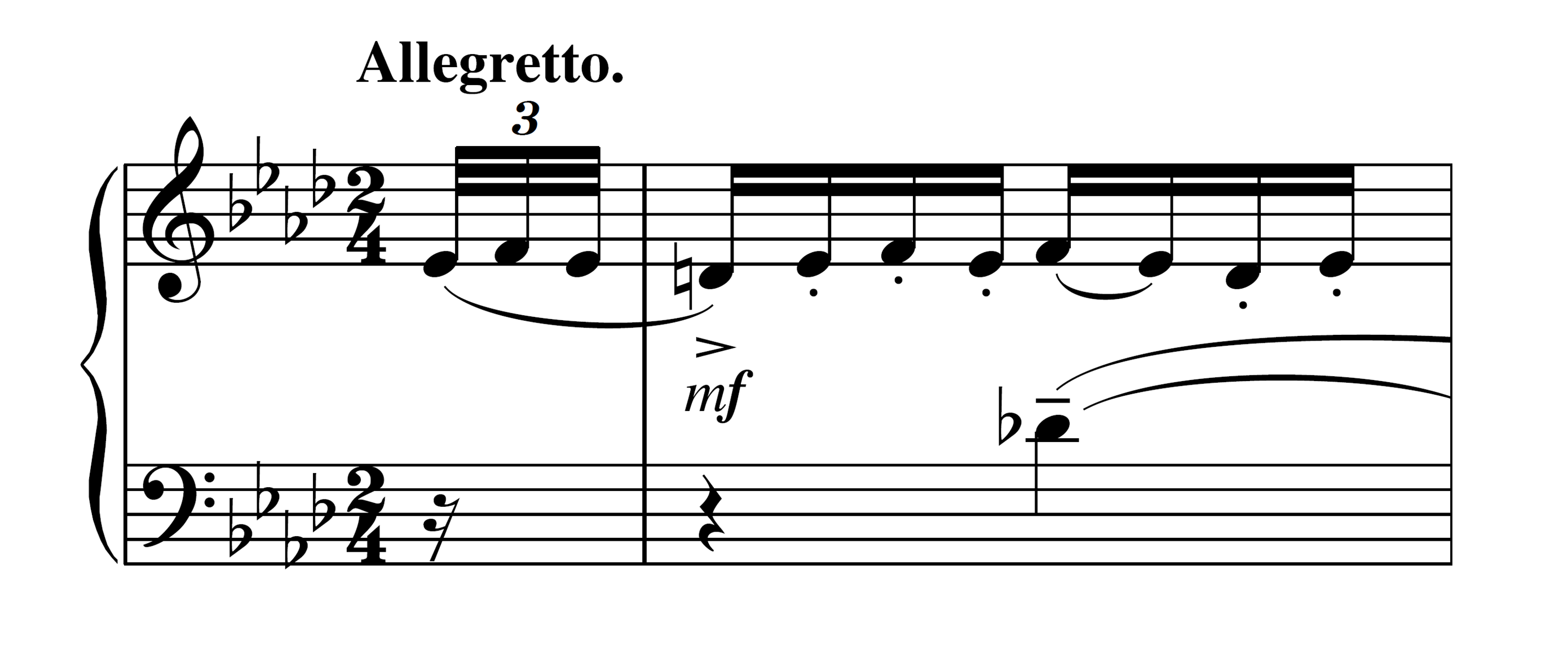
The first two bars of Polka de W.R..

Sergei Rachmaninoff's Polka de W.R. is a virtuoso piano arrangement of Franz Behr's Lachtäubchen (Scherzpolka) in F major.

== Composition ==
Rachmaninoff wrote the arrangement on 24 March 1911, the day after the premiere of the Liturgy of St John Chrysostom in Saint Petersburg. He dedicated it to Leopold Godowsky. It was published the same year, as part of an album of Russian pieces called Nouvelle Collection de Musique; the other composers represented in the album were Alexander Scriabin, Nikolai Medtner, Sergei Taneyev, Georgy Catoire and Alexander Goedicke.

== Analysis ==
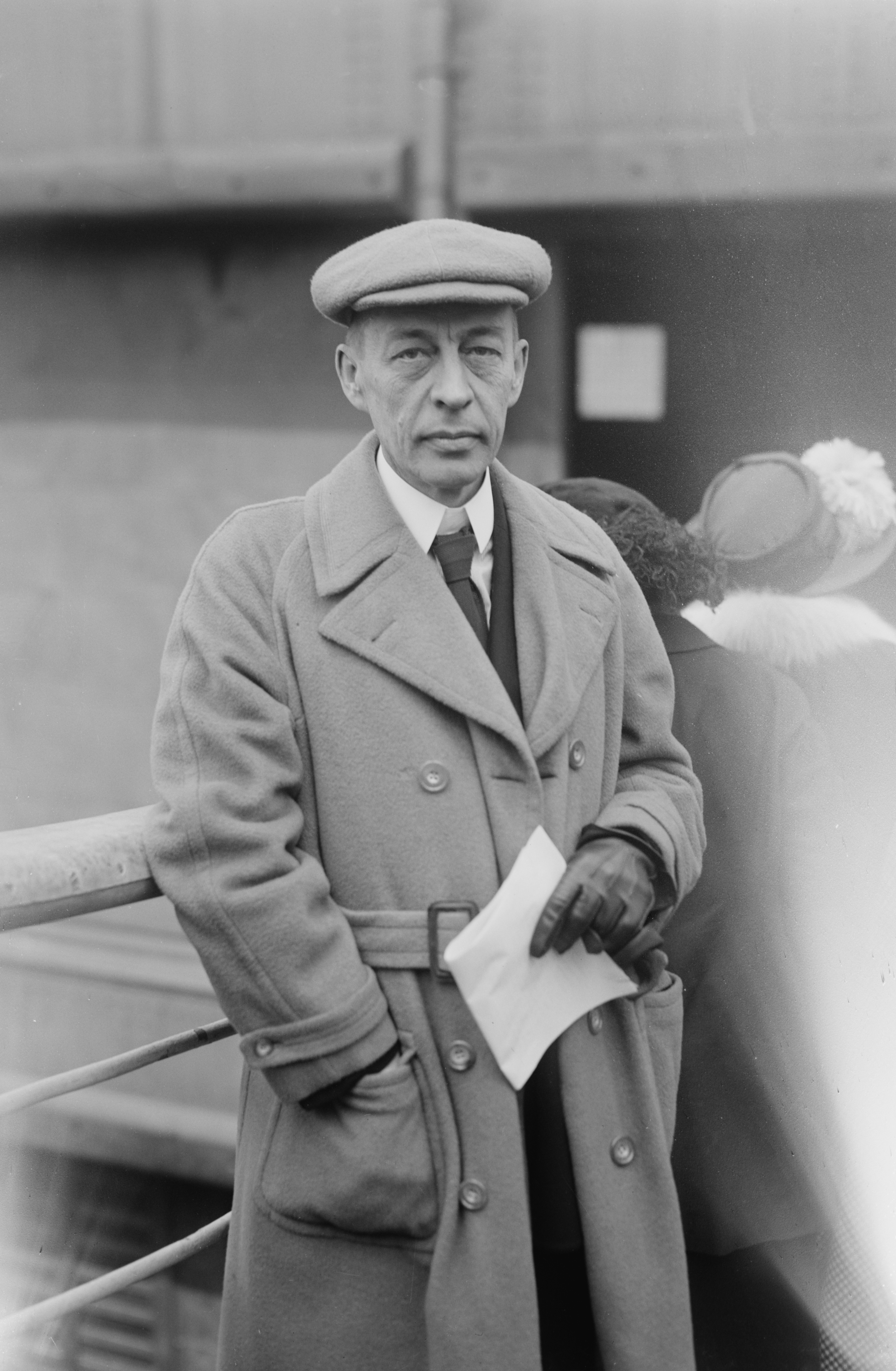
Sergei Rachmaninoff, the composer of Polka de W.R..

Polka de W.R. is in A♭ major and in 2/4 time. The piece starts with semi-quavers in the right-hand and a melody in the left. After four bars, this then progresses to a melody with a quaver followed by triplet semi-quavers underneath. Meanwhile, the left-hand plays a typical polka oom-cha rhythm with firstly a bass note and then a chord above. After 12 bars of this, there is then a melody in the right-hand and chords in the left. This continues for 16 bars. There is then semi-quaver runs with the right hand, accompanied by more chords in the left.

The tempo then changes to Poco piu mosso and the main theme starts. This is then followed by another tempo change to Meno mosso and a key change to C♯ minor. There is then another theme, followed by intricate arpeggio patterns in both hands. After several bars of this, there is another modulation back to A♭ major. Another theme then proceeds until there are two bars of fast, arpeggiated patterns with a sustained chord in the left-hand. This is followed by a further theme until the end, where there is an arpeggio in both hands, a tempo change to Meno mosso, a short, two bar phrase with a melody above and chords below. There is then a penultimate, low pitched chord; followed by a higher pitched chord with a dynamic marking of pianissimo (pp)

== Influences ==
The tune was a favourite of Rachmaninoff's father, Vassily (the "W.R." in the title refers to his father's initials in the German transliteration, Wassily Rachmaninoff), but it is not known whether Rachmaninoff knew its true author to be Franz Behr, or whether he believed that the melody was concocted by his father. Behr was given no mention in the published edition of Polka de W.R., and it was universally believed to be an original work of Rachmaninoff's until the late 20th century, when the true author of the melody was identified. The piece is now generally listed as being by "Behr/Rachmaninoff", or "Behr, arr. Rachmaninoff".

== Notable performers ==
Its first known public performance was on 6 May 1922, by Rachmaninoff himself, at the Queen's Hall, London. He recorded it four times, without revision, and it has been recorded over sixty more times. It was a favourite encore of pianists such as Vladimir Horowitz and Shura Cherkassky.

== See also ==
- Polka Italienne
