= La Revue musicale =

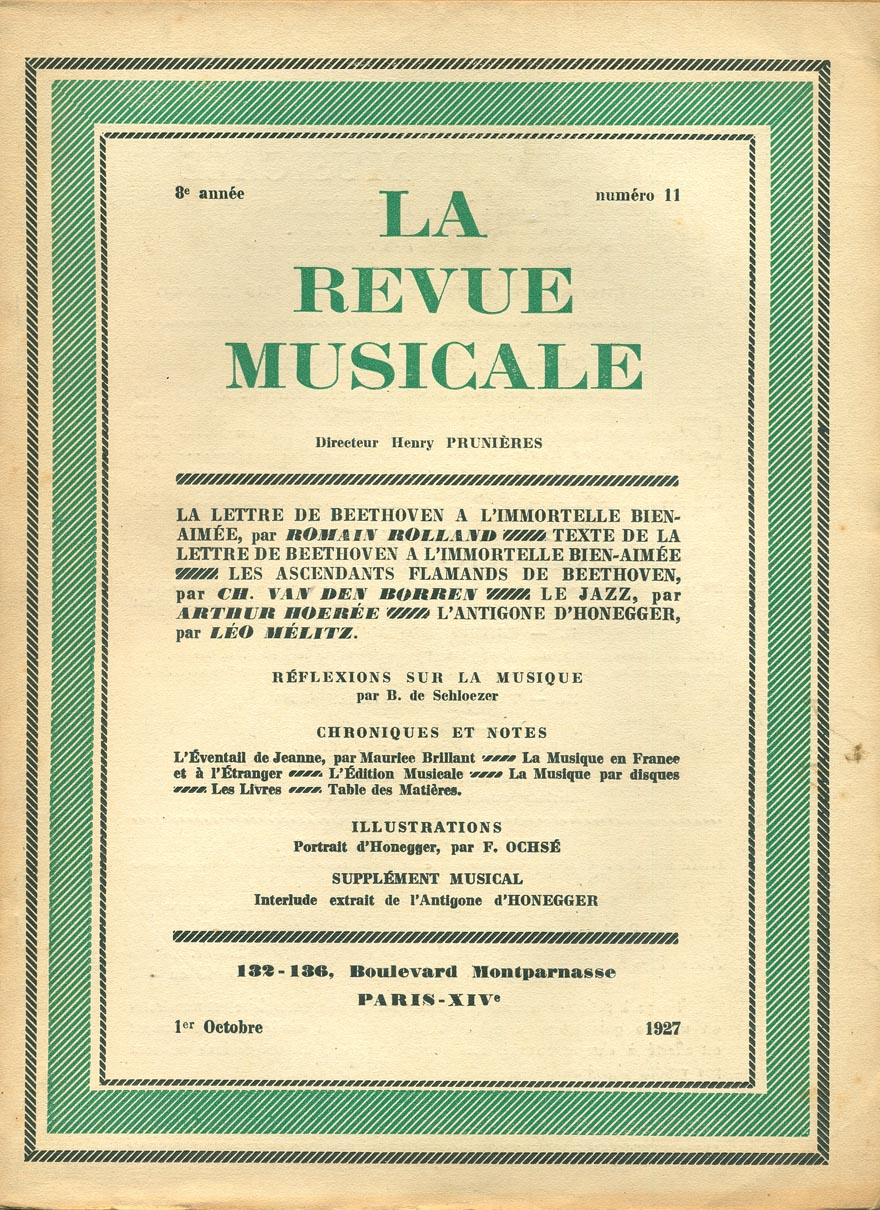
- Cover of La Revue musicale (1927).
- Editor: Henry Prunières
- Frequency: Monthly
- First issue: 1920
- Final issue: 1940
- Country: France
- Language: French

La Revue musicale was a music magazine founded by Henry Prunières in 1920. La Revue musicale of Prunières was undoubtedly the first music publishing magazine giving as much attention to the quality of editing, iconography, and illustration. In each issue (11 per year), there was plenty of information on the musical and choreographic life in many countries.

In addition to the magazine, there were over 160 musical pieces by various composers, most of whom were French, irregularly produced as 81 supplements between 1920 and 1939. Many of these were composed specifically for the magazine. Several compositions have been overlooked in listings of the complete works of the composer.

The magazine's aim was to support the profound changes taking place in the music of the period while simultaneously showing affection for the music of the past. Avoiding intransigent nationalism that marked French classical music before the World War I, the magazine became a reference point for a segment of European music through the interwar period. After 20 years of methodically building a new music firmly based on its adherence to Classicism, the events of World War II caused the magazine to shut down in 1940.

== Collaborators ==
Many writers, colorists, and illustrators collaborated with the magazine. Among them were:

- Émile Chartier
- Gabriele D'Annunzio
- Philippe Barres,
- Victor Basch
- Julien Benda,
- Paul Claudel,
- Jean Cocteau,
- Colette,
- André Gide,
- Edouard Herriot,
- Emil Ludwig,
- Georges Servières,
- Maurice Maeterlinck,
- Countess Anna de Noailles,
- Jacques Maritain,
- Henri de Regnier,
- Romain Rolland,
- Andre Suares,
- Paul Valéry,
- Arthur Lourié,
- Boris de Schloezer.
- Antoine Bourdelle,
- Hermine David,
- André Derain,
- Maxime Dethomas,
- Raoul Dufy,
- André Dunoyer de Segonzac,
- Othon Friesz,
- Demetrios Galanis,
- Natalia Goncharova,
- Max Jacob,
- Marie Laurencin,
- Pablo Picasso.
