= Welland Lathrop =

Welland Lathrop (1905–1981) was a dancer, teacher, painter, and choreographer and a leader of the west coast modern and avant-garde dance movement. Born in upstate New York, he initially trained in costume and scenic design at the Eastman Theater in Rochester, New York. In 1928 he moved to San Francisco to continue his design education under Rudolph Schaeffer. While in San Francisco, he began studying dance with Ann Mundstock of the Laban School. Later training included the Cornish School in Seattle, Washington (1930–1934) and the Neighborhood Playhouse School of the Theater (1938–1941) where he was an assistant in dance composition to Louis Horst. During this time Lathrop performed in several Broadway shows as well as with the Martha Graham Dance Company.
