= Franz Behr =

German composer

Franz Behr (22 July 1837 – 15 February 1898) was a prolific, but minor, and now almost forgotten, German composer of songs and salon pieces for piano.

Behr was popular at one time, and many of his works were published (his opus numbers reached at least 582, with Royal Gavotte). His works include names such as The Camp of the Gypsies (Im Zigeunerlager, Op. 424 No. 3), Will o' the wisp (Op. 309 No. 2), Valse des Elfes (Op. 497), Perciotta, serenade catalane, and Evening Chimes in the Mountains. He also wrote under the names G. Bachmann (Marche bulgare, Succès-mazurk, Collier de rubis, Paris-valse, Gavotte duchesse, Floréal mazurka) and Charles Godard (La Belle Fileuse, L'Angelus (Op. 65), Danse d'Etoiles - Valse (Op. 66)). At least one of his songs was translated into English by Helen Tretbar.

However, the only piece of his that appears in the modern-day repertoire is Lachtäubchen, Scherzpolka in F major, Op. 303 (also known by its French title La rieuse, polka badine), and then only in the form of a transcription as a virtuoso piano piece, Polka de W.R., by Sergei Rachmaninoff. The tune was a favourite of Rachmaninoff's father Vassily (the "W. R." in the title refers to his father's initials in the German transliteration, Wassily Rachmaninoff), but it is not known whether Rachmaninoff knew its true author to be Behr, or whether he believed the melody was concocted by his father. Behr was given no mention in the published edition of Polka de W.R., and it was universally believed to be an original work of Rachmaninoff's until the late 20th century, when the true author of the melody was identified. The piece is now generally listed as being by "Behr/Rachmaninoff", or "Behr, arr. Rachmaninoff".
