= Oksana Lutsyshyn =

Ukrainian-American musician and professor

- Оксана Луцишин
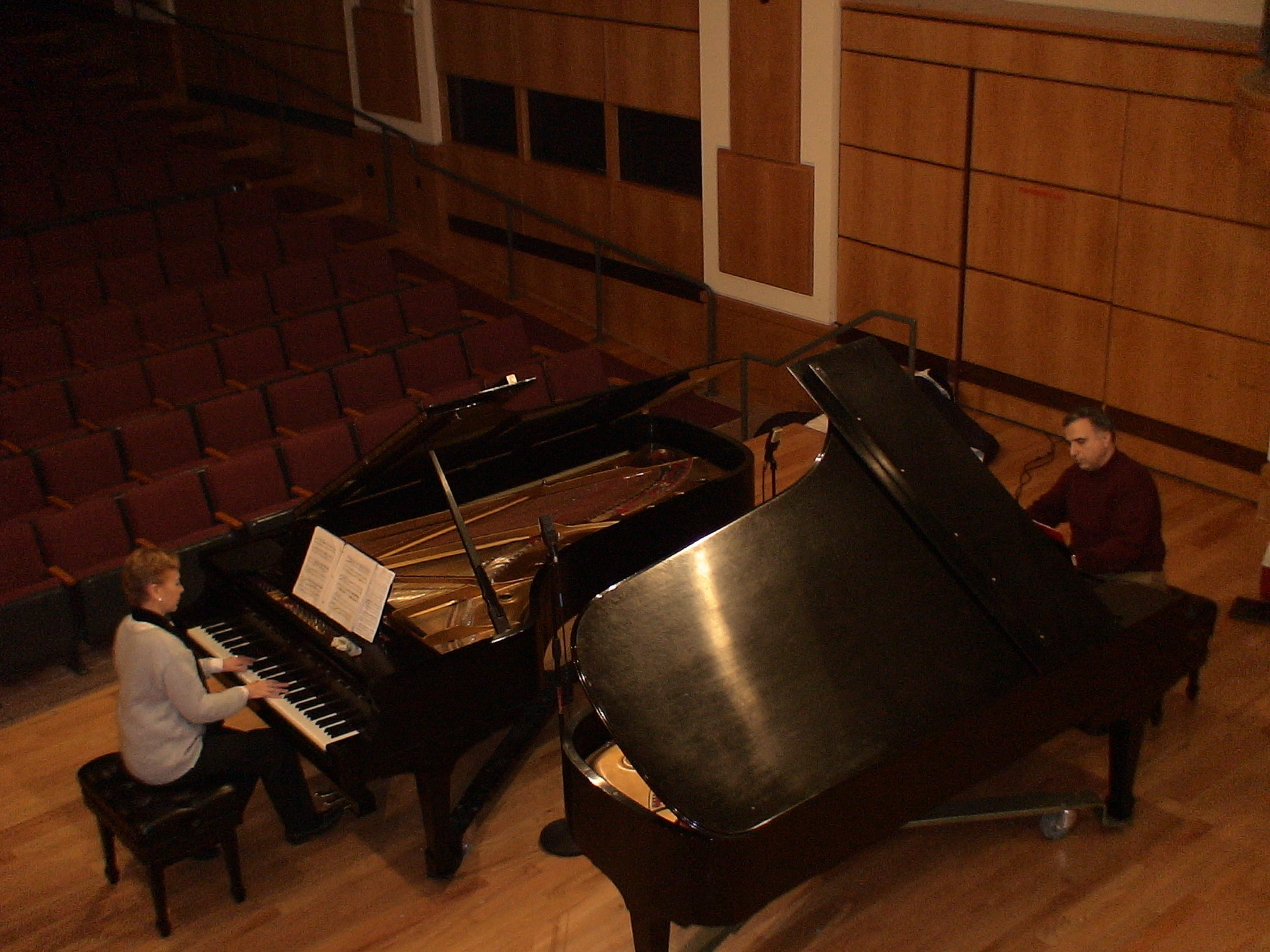
- Oksana Lutsyshyn (left) and Andrey Kasparov (right) in a recording session at the Chandler Recital Hall, Old Dominion University
- Born: July 22, 1964 (age 61); Sokal, Ukrainian SSR, Soviet Union (now Ukraine)
- Occupations: classical pianist; recording artist; academic
- Years active: 1985–present
- Spouse: Andrey Kasparov

Oksana Lutsyshyn (Note: Ukrainian: Оксана Луцишин, romanized: Oksana Lutsyshyn) (born July 22, 1964) is a recording artist, pianist, and professor.

== Biography ==
=== Early life and education ===
Born in Sokal (Lviv Oblast), Ukraine, Lutsyshyn commenced her musical studies at the age of eight. At twelve she entered the Solomiya Krushelnytska Music School in Lviv, where she studied for six years with piano instructor Lidia Golembo. Upon graduation Oksana moved to Moscow. She then entered the State Conservatory, where she studied with Valery Kastelsky, and completed both graduate (1987) and post-graduate (1991) studies. From 1987 to 1989 she served as soloist and accompanist to the Chernivtsi Philharmonie, Chernivtsi Philharmonic Hall, in Ukraine. It was at the Conservatory she met the young Andrey Kasparov. Lutsyshyn participated in the University of Maryland's William Kapell International Piano Competition in July 1990, where she was awarded the Prince George's County Arts Council Prize. Subsequently, sponsored by Grazhda, the Music and Art Center of Greene County, New York, she gave her debut performance at the Weill Recital Hall, Carnegie Hall, in September of the same year.

=== Professional career ===
From 1993 to 1997, after having emigrated to the United States, she became a visiting scholar at the Jacobs School of Music, Indiana University at Bloomington, Indiana. Oksana was also a piano instructor for the school's Special Piano Program. At this same time she accompanied violinists Josef Gingold and Joshua Bell in Mischa Scorer's documentary film, "Joshua Bell", first aired by BBC television in 1994, on Omnibus. The program was later broadcast by Bravo in 1996, and earned for producer Scorer a CableACE Award in 1997. 1996 also saw Oksana's placement in the third International Vienna Modern Masters Performers Recording Awards Competition. She was awarded the Second Prize, with First shared between the violin-piano duos of Dan Almgren and Roland Pöntinen, and Vasilij Meljnikov and Aljoscha Starc, respectively. Lutsyshyn now serves as Professor of Music, on the adjunct music faculty, at Old Dominion University, where she gives instruction in Piano and Music Theory. In October 1997 Oksana Lutsyshyn accompanied violinist Isaac Stern and three students in a master class at the Wilson G. Chandler Recital Hall, Old Dominion University. Most recently, in November 2014, she accompanied tuba soloist Øystein Baadsvik.

Since 2009; she has shared Artistic Directorship of the Norfolk Chamber Consort with husband and fellow pianist, Andrey Kasparov.

=== Invencia Piano Duo ===
Founded by Kasparov and Lutsyshyn, the Invencia Piano Duo was established in 2003.

Released in 2007 by Albany Records, with violinists Desirée Ruhstrat and Pavel Ilyashov, cellist David Cunliffe, guitarist Timothy Olbrych, and mezzo-soprano Lisa Relaford Coston, the Invencia Piano Duo produced Hommages Musicaux, which contained both Tombeau de Claude Debussy and Hommage à Gabriel Fauré.

During production of Hommages Musicaux, the Invencia Piano Duo was introduced to the catalogue of composer Florent Schmitt. Invencia's dedication to Schmitt's duo-piano music culminated in the release of four CDs by Naxos Records on its Grand Piano series. Issued in 2012, Volume 1 was voted "Recording of the Month" and "Critics' Choice" by MusicWeb International and Naxos Records, respectively, in May 2013. As of November 2016, it was announced all four volumes would be made available in a box set on the Grand Piano label of Naxos Records, with a scheduled release in January 2017.

Naxos released Volumes 1 and 2, in April and June 2016, respectively, of a two-album set by the Invencia Piano Duo. Featuring the complete piano works (duo and solo) of author and composer Paul Bowles, this latest recording project was announced upon completion of their work on the music of Florent Schmitt.

== Awards ==
- Prince George's County Arts Council Prize, William Kapell International Piano Competition (1990).
- Finalist, St. Charles International Piano Competition (1991, 1997).
- Second Prize, International Vienna Modern Masters Performers Recording Awards Competition (1996).

== Selected discography ==
=== Albany Records ===
- Hommages Musicaux. Two collections of compositions honouring the memories of Claude Debussy and Gabriel Fauré:
- Ignis Fatuus. Works by Adolphus Hailstork:

=== Naxos Records ===
- Paul Bowles: Complete Piano Works – Vol. 1
- Paul Bowles: Complete Piano Works – Vol. 2
- Florent Schmitt: Complete Original Works for Piano Duet and Duo – Vol. 1
- Florent Schmitt: Complete Original Works for Piano Duet and Duo – Vol. 2
- Florent Schmitt: Complete Original Works for Piano Duet and Duo – Vol. 3
- Florent Schmitt: Complete Original Works for Piano Duet and Duo – Vol. 4

=== Vienna Modern Masters ===
- Twentieth Century Classics: Music for Piano and Strings, Distinguished Performers Series III (Andrey Kasparov, Toccata for piano)
