= Michel Fleury =

French historian and archivist

- Born: Michel Jacques Fleury; November 17, 1923; 5th arrondissement of Paris
- Died: January 18, 2002 (aged 78); 13th arrondissement of Paris
- Resting place: Mortagne-au-Perche
- Occupations: Historian, archivist, archaeologist

Michel Fleury (17 November 1923 in Paris – 18 January 2002 in Paris) was a French historian, archivist and archaeologist, specialising in the history and archaeology of Paris. He is buried in the cemetery of the church of Saint-Germain de Loisé in Mortagne-au-Perche.
