= Nuit d'étoiles =

1880 composition for piano and voice by Claude Debussy

- by Claude Debussy
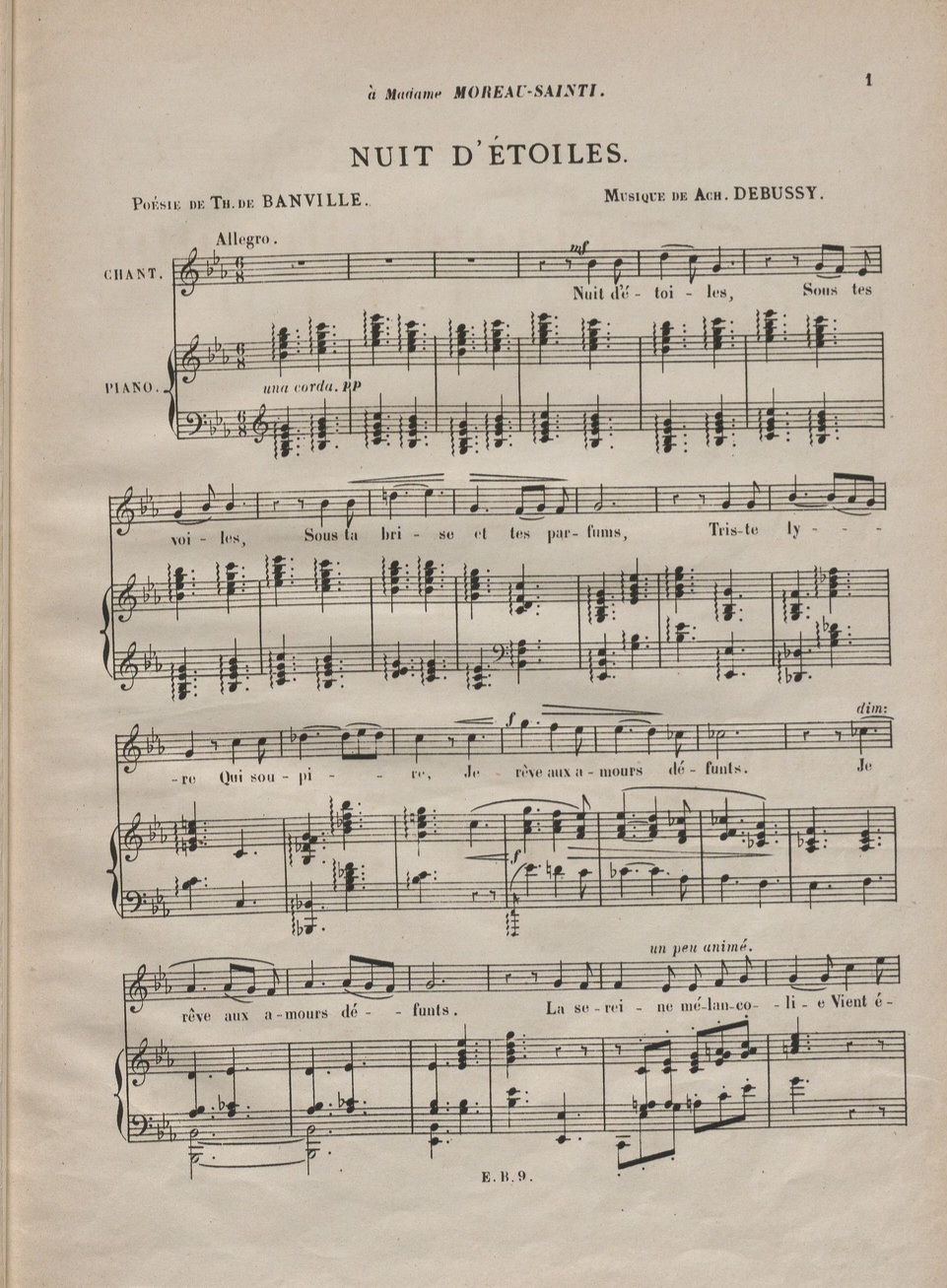
- First edition
- English: Night of Stars
- Catalogue: L. 2
- Genre: mélodie
- Language: French
- Composed: 1880

"Nuit d'étoiles" is a mélodie by Claude Debussy based on a poem by Théodore de Banville.

== Overview ==
Debussy composed "Nuit d'étoiles" in 1880 when he was eighteen years old, based on a poem from Théodore de Banville's 1846 collection, Les Stalactites. He dedicated the short composition, less than three minutes, to the singing teacher Madame Moreau-Sainti who had hired him as accompanist for her classes.

Versions of "Nuit d'étoiles" have been recorded by Véronique Gens, Natalie Dessay, Sophie Karthäuser, and Sabine Devieilhe.

== Recordings ==
Year	Singer	Accompanist	Label
1950	Lily Pons	Frank La Forge	Columbia
1979	Hugues Cuénod	Martin Isepp	Nimbus Records
1980	Elly Ameling	Dalton Baldwin	EMI
1984	Anne-Marie Rodde	Noël Lee	Etcetera
1985	Gérard Souzay	Dalton Baldwin	Decca
1992	Jessye Norman	James Levine	Philips Classics
1994	Francis Dudziak	Jean-Bernard Dartigolles	Accord
1999	Christiane Oelze	Rudolf Jansen	Berlin Classics
2000	Véronique Gens	Roger Vignoles	Virgin Classics
2001	Christopher Maltman	Malcolm Martineau	Hyperion
2003	Gillian Keith	Simon Lepper	Deux-Elles
2007	Sandrine Piau	Susan Manoff	Naïve
2008	Anne-Marie Faniel	Gloria Monica Hernandez	Sonido
2011	Jan van der Crabben	Inge Spinette	Fuga Libera
2012	Natalie Dessay	Philippe Cassard	Erato
2013	Stella Doufexis	Daniel Heide	Berlin Classics
2017	Yaniv d'Or	Dan Deutsch	Naxos
2017	Emőke Baráth	Virág Emese	Hungaroton
2018	Lorna Windsor	Antonio Ballista	Brilliant Classics
2018	Sophie Karthäuser	Alain Planès	Harmonia Mundi
2019	Angela Gheorghiu	Alexandra Dariescu	Decca
2020	Sabine Devieilhe	Alexandre Tharaud	Erato

== Lyrics ==
Nuit d’étoiles,
Sous tes voiles,
Sous ta brise et tes parfums,
Triste lyre
Qui soupire,
Je rêve aux amours défunts.

La sereine mélancolie
Vient éclore au fond de mon cœur,
Et j’entends l’âme de ma mie
Tressaillir dans le bois rêveur.

Nuit d’étoiles ...

Je revois à notre fontaine
Tes regards bleus comme les cieux;
Cette rose, c’est ton haleine,
Et ces étoiles sont tes yeux.

Nuit d’étoiles ...

Night of stars,
Beneath your veils,
beneath your breeze and fragrance,
Sad lyre
That sighs,
I dream of bygone loves.

Serene melancholy
Now blooms deep in my heart,
And I hear the soul of my love
Quiver in the dreaming woods.

Night of stars...

Once more at our fountain I see
Your eyes as blue as the sky;
This rose is your breath
And these stars are your eyes.

Night of stars...
