= Debussy Mélodies =

- EMI Pathé Marconi LP: 2C 165 16371-4

Studio album by Dalton Baldwin
- Released: 1980
- Studio: Salle Wagram, Paris
- Genre: Classical vocal
- Length: 178:37
- Language: French
- Label: EMI Classics
- Producer: Eric Macleod

Debussy Mélodies is a 178-minute studio album of sixty of Claude Debussy's art songs, presented roughly in order of composition, performed by Elly Ameling, Michèle Command, Mady Mesplé, Frederica von Stade and Gérard Souzay with piano accompaniment by Dalton Baldwin. It was released in 1980.

== Recording ==
The album was recorded using analogue technology in April 1971, January and December 1977, October and December 1978 and January and February 1979 in the Salle Wagram, Paris.

== Cover art ==
The covers of the LP and CD versions of the album both feature a photograph by Lauros-Giraudon of a detail of Tête de jeune fille vue de profil by Aristide Maillol (1861-1944), a painting in the Musée Rigaud, Perpignan.

== Critical reception ==
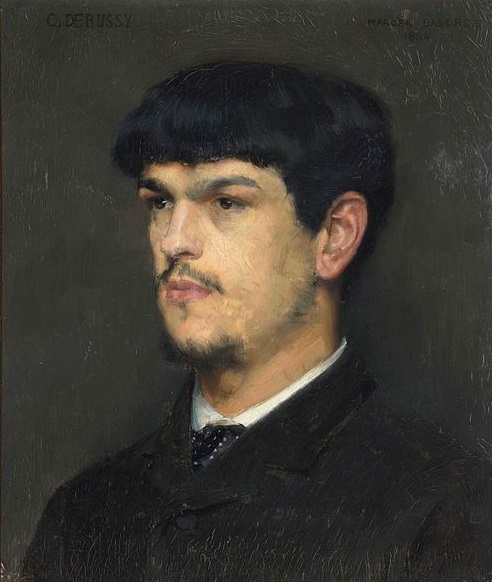
Claude Debussy portrayed by Marcel Baschet in 1884

Alan Blyth reviewed the album on LP in Gramophone in December 1980. Debussy's limitations as a songwriter, he wrote, had been hinted at by Paul Dukas: "If he sets a given text, his efforts tend less towards training his thoughts on it than, by a sort of personal paraphrase, to note the musical impressions suggested to him on reading the poem." The mélodies on the album's first two discs, Debussy's earliest essays in the form, were evidence that Dukas had been correct. Written in a "pleasing but rather anonymous style", they did little to magnify the emotions inherent in their verse. It did not help matters that several of them were performed disappointingly. Gérard Souzay, recorded late in his career, was far from compelling, and Mady Mesplé, also well past her prime, could offer only "a thin, squeaky tone wholly inadequate to the task in hand." It was left to Michèle Command in the Cinq poèmes de Baudelaire to serve both words and music satisfactorily. In the remainder of the collection, things improved markedly. Debussy grew in power and discrimination, seeing beneath the surfaces of his texts into their hearts, and the quality of the singing improved in parallel. The Dutch soprano Elly Ameling, "though not wholly idiomatic", sang "with all accustomed good manners and thoughtfulness" in the Proses lyriques and the first set of Fêtes galantes. The American Frederica von Stade was "suitably languorous and relaxed in Ariettes oubliées, with clearer words than one is accustomed to hear from her in this kind of music". Command was "appropriately seductive" in the Chansons de Bilitis. And Souzay, recorded much later than on Side 1 – the album was taped at intervals over some eight years – sang the Villon Ballades and the second set of Fêtes galantes in a way that few others could have equalled. Ameling concluded the recording with a beautiful rendition of some delicate Mallarmé settings and Debussy's sorrowful, angry First World War Christmas carol for homeless children. Dalton Baldwin's accompaniments were technically proficient if not the last word in nuancing or fantasy, the audio balance not helping him by relegating his piano too much to the background. Even with all its faults, Blyth concluded, the album was not one that Debussy enthusiasts should pass by – it was unlikely that another such survey of Debussy's mélodies would appear for some time.

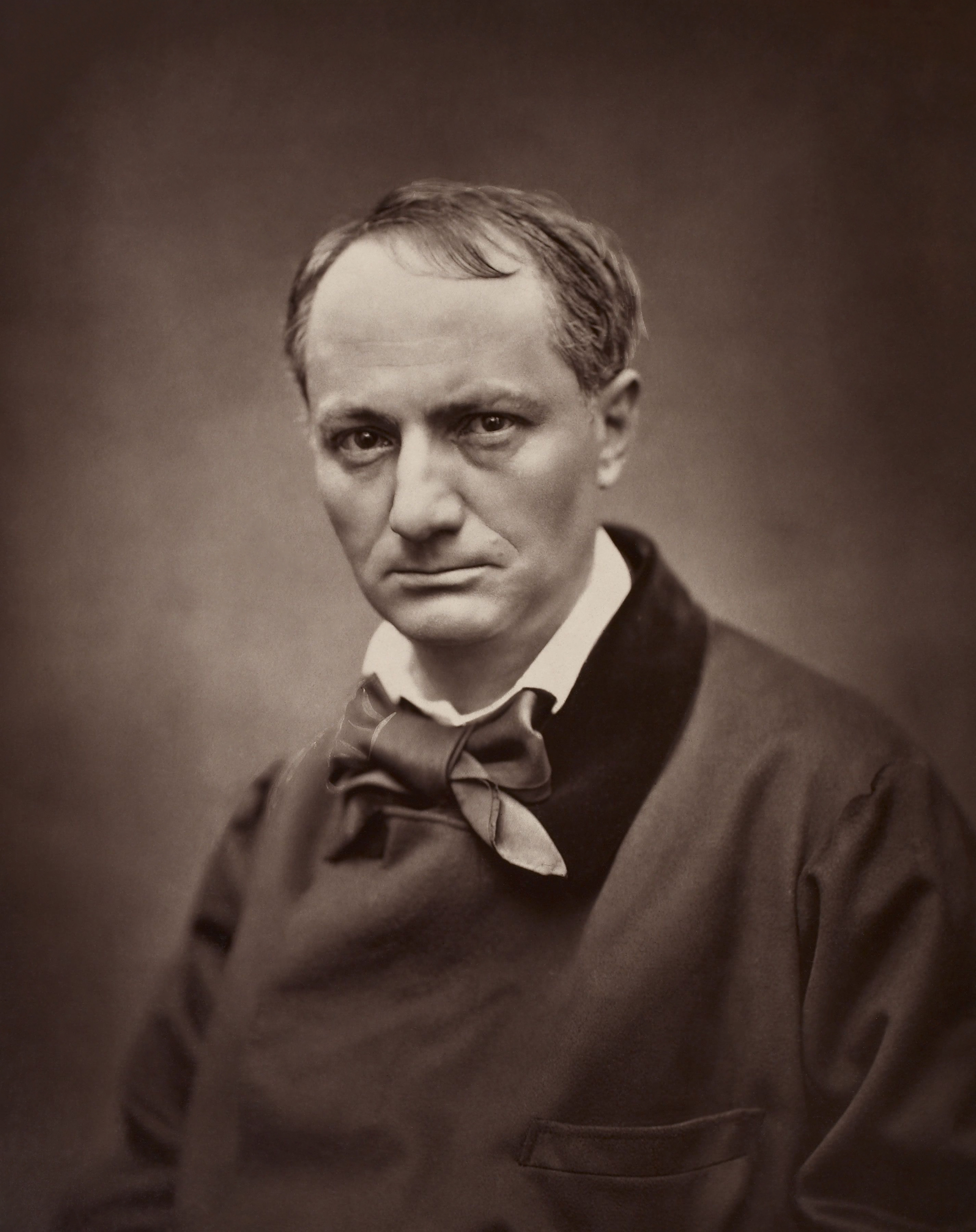
Charles Baudelaire photographed by Étienne Carjat, circa 1862

Lionel Salter reviewed the album on CD in Gramophone in May 1992. Like his colleague, he thought that the songs which Debussy had composed in his youth were much the album's weakest. "Content merely to sketch a suitably atmospheric background to the words", they contained little of Debussy's musical personality, and it was unfortunate that many of them had been allotted to Mady Mesplé. With her "fast vibrato and bright coquettish voice", she was a poor choice for mélodies that demanded a vocal flavour more like burgundy and less like prosecco. Gérard Souzay too, "tired and old", was a less than perfect advocate for the music of Debussy's novice years. Things went more happily when one of the other three artists sang. Elly Ameling was good in Debussy's juvenilia, better in the masterpieces of his maturity and touching in the "appealing innocence" that she brought to the wartime carol that he had composed not long before his death. Michèle Command conveyed all the eroticism of the Chansons de Bilitis and her Baudelaire group, the latter especially beautifully done. But even her singing could not rival the "languorous and ecstatic" Ariettes oubliées that were Frederica von Stade's brief contribution to the album, their sensuality variegated by a suitable merriment in the carousel-themed 'Chevaux de bois'. Souzay, finally, compensated for his unhappy efforts on the album's first disc by providing some of the choicest items on its third: his Villon group and his Promenoir des deux amants displayed "a style probably unmatched by any other interpreter". As Blyth had thought in 1981, Dalton Baldwin's accompaniment was dependable but a little stolid, and not always ideally balanced by EMI's production team. EMI's insert booklet was not one of the company's finest: it contradicted the album's claim to completeness by asserting that Debussy had composed some eighty songs rather than the anthology's sixty, and omitted the helpful translations that had been included when the album was released on vinyl.

== Track listing, CD1 ==
Claude Debussy (1862–1918)

Elly Ameling

- 1 (3:08) Nuit d'étoiles (Théodore de Banville, 1823–1891)
- 2 (2:00) Fleur de blés (André Girod)

Gérard Souzay

- 3 (2:15) Beau soir (Paul Bourget, 1852–1935)
- 4 (1:20) Mandoline (Paul Verlaine, 1844–1896)

Michèle Command

- 5 (3:46) La belle au bois dormant (Vincent Hyspa)

Mady Mesplé

- 6 (2:45) Voici que le printemps (Paul Bourget)
- 7 (3:40) Paysage sentimental (Paul Bourget)
- 8 (1:59) Zéphyr (Théodore de Banville)
- 9 (2:46) Rondeau (Alfred de Musset, 1810–1857)

Quatre chansons de jeunesse

- 10 (2:08) I Pantomime (Paul Verlaine)
- 11 (2:43) II Clair de lune, 1st version (Paul Verlaine)
- 12 (1:32) III Pierrot (Théodore de Banville)
- 13 (3:34) IV Apparition (Stephane Mallarmé, 1842–1898)
- 14 (3:47) Rondel chinois (Anonymous)
- 15 (2:42) Aimons-nous et dormons (Théodore de Banville)
- 16 (2:50) Jane (Leconte de Lisle, 1818–1894)
- 17 (3:05) Calmes dans le demi-jour (Paul Verlaine)
- 18 (2:15) Romance (Paul Bourget)

Michèle Command

- 19 (2:14) Les cloches (Paul Bourget)
- 20 (2:04) Les angelus (Grégoire Le Roy)

Elly Ameling

- 21 (2:16) Dans le jardin (Paul Gravollet)

Gérard Souzay

- 22 (2:04) La mer est plus belle (Paul Verlaine)
- 23 (2:48) Le son du cor s'afflige (Paul Verlaine)
- 24 (1:17) L'Échelonnement des haies (Paul Verlaine)

Elly Ameling

Fêtes galantes, Set 1 (Paul Verlaine)

- 25 (3:07) I En sourdine
- 26 (1:13) II Fantoches
- 27 (2:43) III Clair de lune

== Track listing, CD2 ==
Michèle Command

Cinq poèmes de Charles Baudelaire (Charles Baudelaire, 1821–1867)

- 1 (7:44) I Le balcon
- 2 (4:08) II Harmonie du soir
- 3 (5:46) III Le jet d'eau
- 4 (4:51) IV Recueillement (Méditation)
- 5 (2:55) V La mort des amants

Elly Ameling

Prose lyriques (Claude Debussy)

- 6 (5:58) De rêve
- 7 (3:17) De grève
- 8 (5:32) De fleurs
- 9 (3:56) De soir

Frederica von Stade

Ariettes oubliées (Paul Verlaine)

- 10 (3:11) I C'est l'extase
- 11 (2:37) II Il pleure dans mon cœur
- 12 (2:30) III L'Ombre des arbres dans la rivière
- 13 (3:00) IV Paysages belges – chevaux de bois
- 14 (2:07) V Aquarelle No. 1: Green
- 15 (2:27) VI Aquarelle No. 2: Spleen

== Track listing, CD3 ==
Michèle Command

Trois chansons de Bilitis (Pierre Louÿs, 1870–1925)

- 1 (2:31) I La flûte de Pan
- 2 (3:16) II La chevelure
- 3 (2:£6) III Le tombeau des Naïades

Gérard Souzay

Fêtes galantes, Set 2 (Paul Verlaine)

- 4 (2:17) I Les ingénus
- 5 (1:56) II Le faune
- 6 (3:54) III Colloque sentimental

Chansons de France (Charles d'Orléans)

- 7 (1:04) I Rondel: "Le temps a laissié son manteau"
- 8 (2:22) II Rondel: "Pour ce que plaisance est morte"

Le promenoir des deux amants (Tristan Lhermitte)

- 9 (2:52) I Auprès de cette grotte sombre
- 10 (1:46) II Crois mon conseil, chère Climène
- 11 (2:11) III Je tremble en voyant ton visage

Trois ballades de François Villon (François Villon, circa 1431–1463)

- 12 (4:12) I Ballade de Villon à s'amye
- 13 (4:33) II Ballade que Villon feit à la requeste de sa mère pour Notre-Dame
- 14 (2:00) III Ballade des femmes de Paris

Elly Ameling

Trois poèmes de Stéphane Mallarmé (Stéphane Mallarmé)

- 15 (2:53) I Soupir
- 16 (2:01) II Placet futile
- 17 (2:16) III Éventail
- 18 (2:30) Noël des enfants qui n'ont plus de maisons (Claude Debussy)

== Personnel ==
=== Performers ===
- Elly Ameling, soprano
- Michèle Command, soprano
- Mady Mesplé, soprano
- Frederica von Stade, mezzo-soprano
- Gérard Souzay (1918-2004), baritone
- Dalton Baldwin, piano

=== Other ===
- Eric Macleod, producer
- Serge Rémy, balance engineer

== Release history ==
In 1980, EMI Pathé Marconi released the album as a set of four LPs (catalogue number 2C 165 16371–4), accompanied by a booklet providing notes by Stefan Jarocinski and the texts of the songs in English and French.

In 1991, EMI Classics issued the album as a set of three CDs (catalogue number CMS 7 64095–2 in Britain, catalogue number CDMC 64095 in America), with a 28-page booklet providing an essay by Jean Roy in English and French and the texts of the songs in French only. The album was part of EMI's "L'Ésprit Français" series.
