= Voyage à Paris =

- RCA Victor Red Seal CD, 09026-62711-2

Studio album by Frederica von Stade
- Released: 1995
- Studio: Manhattan Center, New York City
- Genre: Classical vocal
- Length: 70:07
- Language: French
- Label: RCA Victor Red Seal
- Producer: John Pfeiffer

Voyage à Paris is a 70-minute studio album of French art songs performed by Frederica von Stade with piano accompaniment by Martin Katz. It was released in 1995.

== Recording ==
The album was recorded digitally on 29 and 30 April 1993 in the Manhattan Center, New York City.

== Cover art ==
The cover of the album was designed under the art direction of J. J. Stelmach, and features a photograph of von Stade and Katz taken by Carol Weinberg.

== Critical reception ==
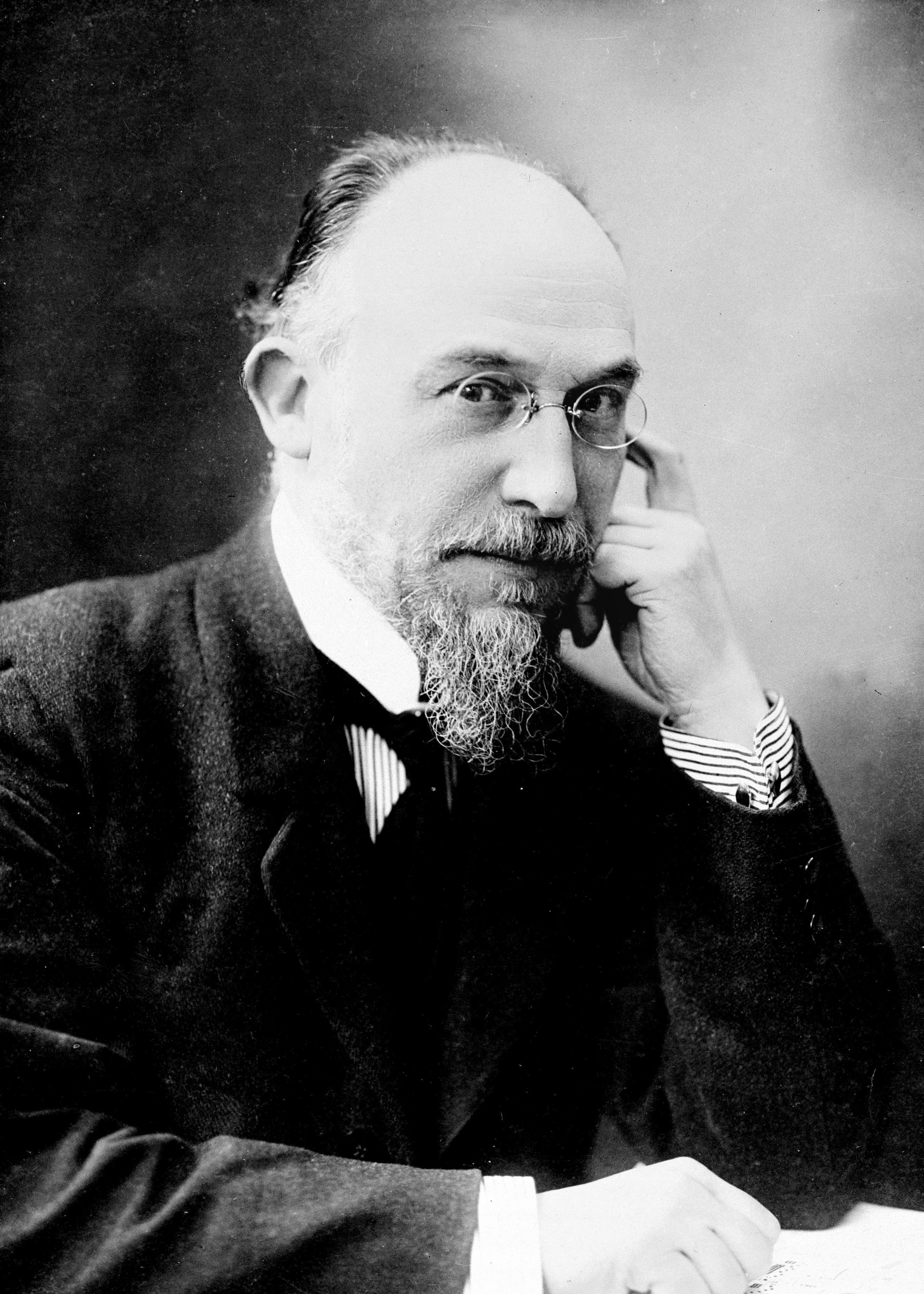
Eric Satie in 1920

Richard T. Fairman reviewed the album in Gramophone in April 1995. It was notable, he wrote, for including several worthwhile songs that were seldom encountered.

British listeners would be amused by Honegger's Petit cours de morale ("A short course in morals"). The cycle limned cameos of Britons viewed quizzically from the southern side of the English Channel, among them the globetrotting Spencer, who had discovered that the world of one's fantasy could be even bigger than the world beneath one's feet.

The album's Messiaen group represented his first essay in the mélodie form, written as early as 1930. "La fiancée perdue" was typical of his work in its mystical rhapsodizing, but "Pourquoi?" did not sound at all Messiaenic until its very last bars, when its sentimentality gave way to an eruption of pianistic bird-song.

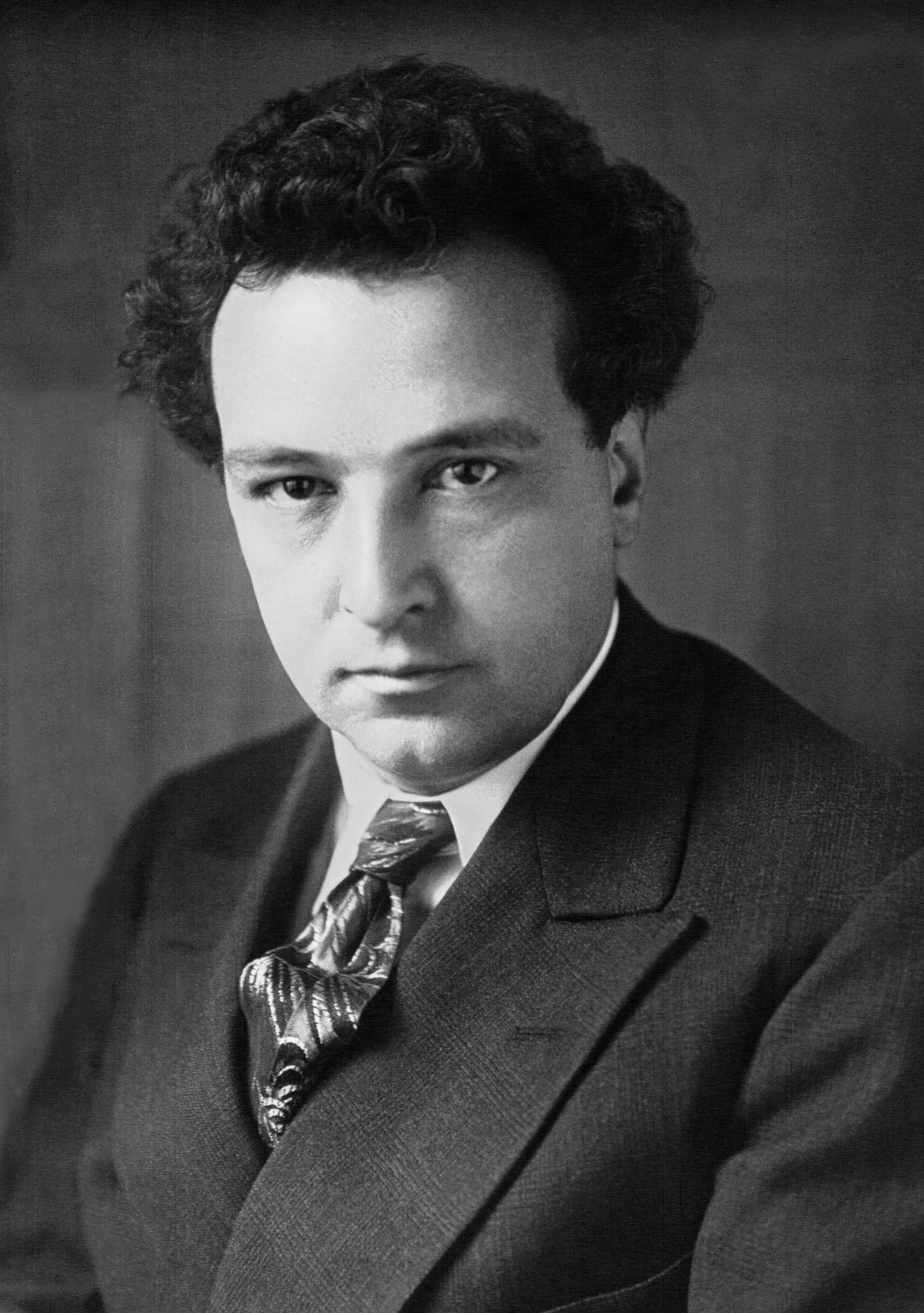
Arthur Honegger in 1928

Frederica von Stade's performances were not quite as easy to commend as her programming. Her voice remained in reasonably good health. Her upper notes had begun to sound uncomfortable under stress - the "haute feuilles" ("high leaves") of Debussy's "L'ombre des arbres" were now only just accessible to her - but her fans would be happy to hear that her middle register remained "as delicately coloured ... as ever." Her album's weakness lay less in her vocalism than in her interpretations.

The Metropolitan Opera had recently marked the silver anniversary of her Met debut with a staging of Debussy's Pelléas et Mélisande. Mélisande was one of her signature roles, and "its wistfulness and fey vulnerability suit her to perfection". It was a pity that she had brought something of Mélisande to songs that were very remote from the glooms of Allemonde. Her reading of Ravel's Cinq mélodies populaires grecques, for instance, lacked the rhythmic energy that Mady Mesplé had extracted from them in EMI's box set of the composer's songs.

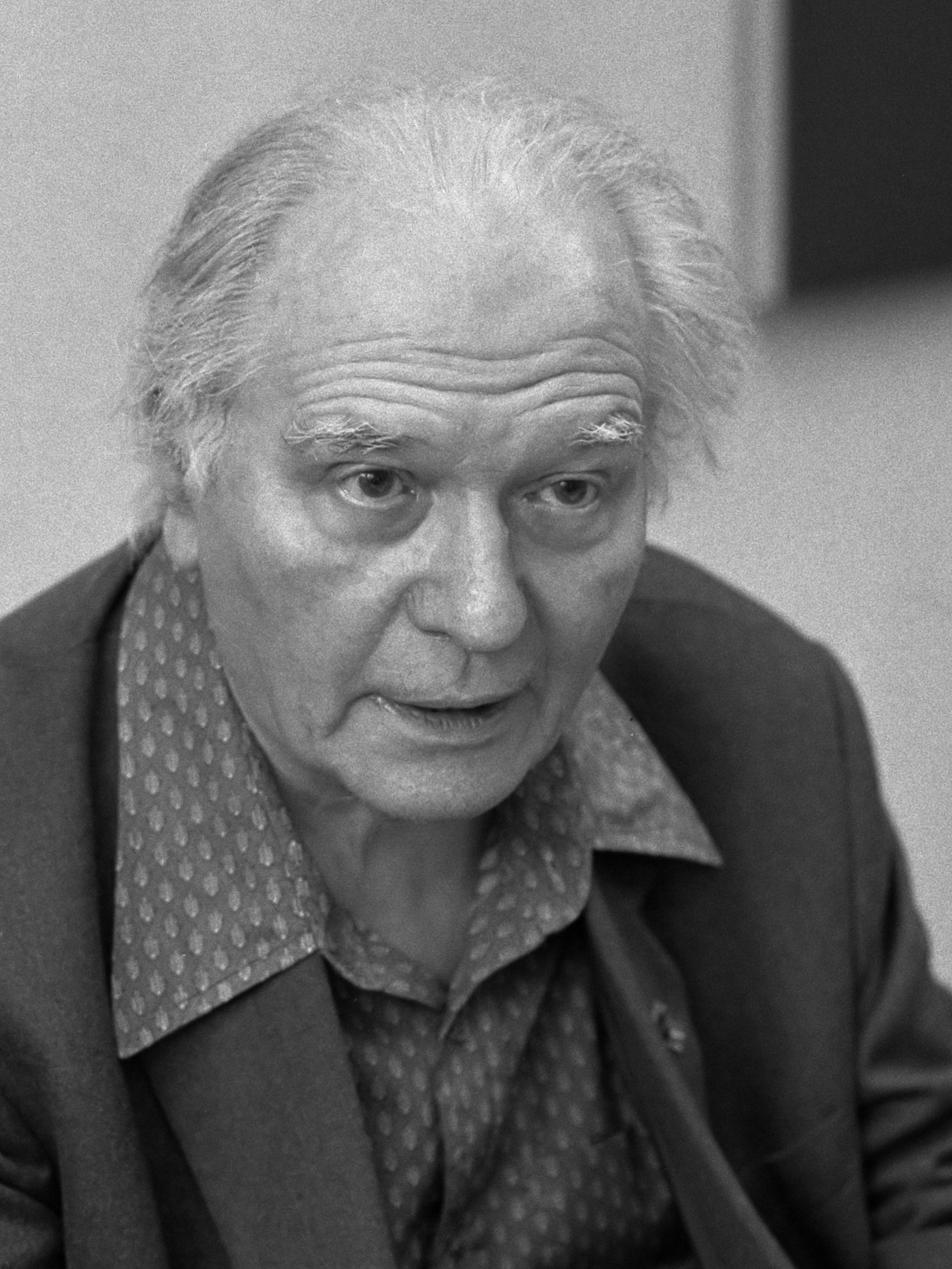
Olivier Messiaen in 1986

In Debussy's "C'est l'extase langoureuse", the first of his Ariettes oubliées, the languorous ecstasy was overdone - "the tempo is slowish and the portamentos droop wiltingly". This was not the only song on the album in which she was sometimes "enervating".

On the positive side, she had a firm grasp of Honegger's and Messiaen's idioms, and her performances of her Poulenc and Satie songs were to be welcomed. Martin Katz was maybe a little too accommodating at his keyboard, but his contribution to the disc was invaluable. Despite its weaknesses, the CD was an interesting one.

Jamie James reviewed the album in Stereo Review in September 1995. Frederica von Stade, he wrote, had "long made a speciality of early twentieth-century French art songs, and she brings her usual verve and charm to bear upon the ones in this generous collection".

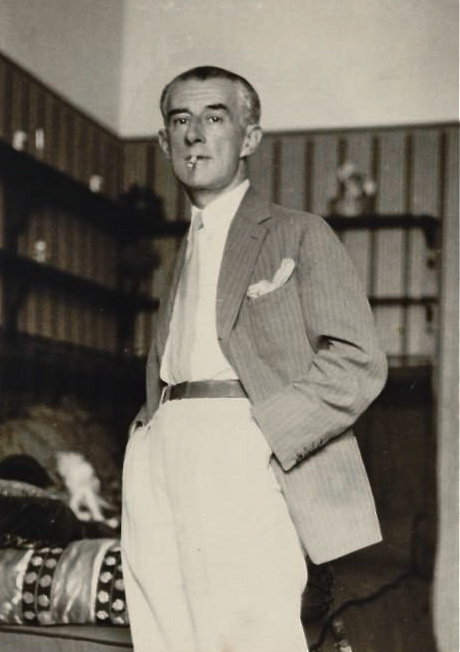
Maurice Ravel in 1928

This said, her voice lost colour and fullness when she put it under pressure, and she was "just a touch heavy-handed with feather-fine trifles" in her Poulenc and Satie items. Martin Katz was adept in his accompaniments, and RCA's engineers had achieved a sound quality of "pleasing resonance".

David Patrick Stearns mentioned the album in Gramophone in May 2016, when reviewing a box set of von Stade's Columbia CDs (Frederica von Stade: The Complete Columbia Recital Albums) in which it was included. "The ambitious Voyage à Paris recital", he wrote, "shows Poulenc and Messiaen as having common word-painting priorities, partly because [von Stade] calls attention more to the music than to herself. And because her vocal technique is so much from the neck down, you never see (and rarely hear) the work that goes into her singing".

David Shengold touched on the album in Opera News in December 2016 in the course of reviewing the same box set. "Voyage à Paris", he wrote, "... finds von Stade with ... autumnal tone, but the legato flows freely in the contemplative, handsomely turned mélodies by Satie, Poulenc, Honegger, Messiaen and others."

The album was also reviewed in the Gramophone Classical Good CD Guide 1998 and in Opera Now.

== CD track listing ==
Francis Poulenc (1899-1963)

La courte paille (Royaumont, 1961), with texts by Maurice Carême (1899-1978)

- 1 (2:05) "Le sommeil"
- 2 (1:03) "Quelle aventure!"
- 3 (1:58) "La reine de cœur"
- 4 (0:26) "Ba, be, bi, bo, bu"
- 5 (1:26) "Les anges musiciens"
- 6 (1:04) "Le carafon"
- 7 (2:34) "Lune d'avril"

Erik Satie (1866-1925)

Trois mélodies (Paris, 1916)

- 8 (1:45) "La statue de bronze", with a text by Léon-Paul Fargue (1876-1947)
- 9 (1:23) "Daphénéo", with a text by Mimi Godebska (1899-1949)
- 10 (0:55) "Le chapelier", with a text by René Chalupt (1885-1947) after Alice's Adventures in Wonderland (1865) by Lewis Carroll (1832-1898)

Claude Debussy (1862-1918)

Ariettes oubliées (1887), with texts by Paul Verlaine (1844-1896)

- 11 (3:14) "C'est l'extase langoureuse"
- 12 (2:44) "Il pleure dans mon cœur"
- 13 (2:47) "L'ombre des arbres"
- 14 (3:12) "Chevaux de bois (Paysage belge)"
- 15 (2:16) "Green (Aquarelle No. 1)"
- 16 (2:36) "Spleen (Aquarelle No. 2)"

Arthur Honegger (1892-1955)

Petit cours de morale (1941), with texts from Suzanne et le Pacifique (1921) by Jean Giraudoux (1882-1944)

- 17 (0:40) "Jeanne"
- 18 (0:53) "Adèle"
- 19 (1:11) "Cécile"
- 20 (1:02) "Irène"
- 21 (1:21) "Rosamonde"

Maurice Ravel (1875-1937)

Cinq mélodies populaires grecques (1906), with traditional texts translated by Michel-Dimitri Calvocoressi (1877-1944)

- 22 (1:23) "Chanson de la mariée"
- 23 (1:45) "Là-bas, vers l'église"
- 24 (0:58) "Quel galant m'est comparable"
- 25 (2:43) "Chanson de cueilleuses de lentisques"
- 26 (0:53) "Tout gai!"

Claude Debussy

Fêtes galantes, Vol. 1 (1904). with texts by Paul Verlaine

- 27 (3:12) "En sourdine"
- 28 (3:09) "Clair de lune"
- 29 (1:17) "Fantoches"

Olivier Messiaen (1908-1992)

Trois mélodies (1930)

- 30 (2:19) "Pourquoi?", with a text by Cécile Sauvage
- 31 (1:26) "Le sourire", with a text by Cécile Sauvage
- 32 (2:35) "La fiancée perdue", with a text by Olivier Messiaen

Francis Poulenc

Banalités (1940), with texts by Guillaume Apollinaire (1880-1918)

- 33 (1:55) No. 2: "Hôtel"
- 34 (0:57) No. 4: "Voyage à Paris"

Métamorphoses (1943), with texts by Louise Lévêque de Vilmorin (1902-1969)

- 35 (2:28) No. 2: "C'est ainsi que tu es"

Deux poèmes de Louis Aragon (1943), with texts by Louis Aragon (1897-1982)

- 36 (0:57) No. 2: "Fêtes galantes"
- 37 (3:00) "À sa guitar" (1935), with a text by Pierre de Ronsard (1524-1585)

== Personnel ==
=== Musical ===
- Frederica von Stade (b. 1945), mezzo-soprano
- Martin Katz (b. 1944), piano

=== Other ===
- John Pfeiffer, producer
- Anthony Salvatore, engineer
- Thomas MacCluskey, editing engineer

== Release history ==
On 14 February 1995, RCA Victor Red Seal released the album on CD (catalogue number 09026-62711-2) with a 48-page booklet containing the texts of the songs, a biography of Katz and lengthy contributions from von Stade, all in English, French and German. In 2016, Sony reissued the album on CD with a 52-page booklet in their 18-CD collection Frederica von Stade: The Complete Columbia Recital Albums (catalogue number 88875183412).
