= La Courte Paille =

Song cycle composed by Francis Poulenc

- Songs by Francis Poulenc
- Catalogue: FP 178
- Based on: Poems by Maurice Carême
- Composed: Summer 1960
- Performed: September 1961
- Scoring: Voice; piano

Premiere
- Location: Festival de Royaumont (then Seine-et-oise department)

La Courte Paille (The Short Straw), FP 178, is a set of seven songs for voice and piano, composed in 1960 by Francis Poulenc on poems by Maurice Carême. The duration of the work is roughly 8 minutes.

== History of the work ==
Composed in July–August 1960, the songs were premiered at the festival of Royaumont Abbey, in 1961, by soprano Colette Herzog and Jacques Février as the pianist.

== Titles ==
1. Le sommeil
2. Quelle aventure !
3. La reine de cœur
4. Ba, be, bi, bo, bu
5. Les anges musiciens
6. Le carafon
7. Lune d'avril

== Origin of the poems ==
Le sommeil, Ba, be, bi, bo, bu and Le carafon come from the collection of Maurice Carême La Cage aux grillons (1959).

Quelle aventure ! , La reine de cœur, Les anges musiciens and Lune d'avril come from the collection Le Voleur d'étincelles (1960).

== Dedicatee ==
La Courte Paille is dedicated to the singer Denise Duval (1921–2016) in honor of her son Richard Schilling.

== Discography ==
- Fiançailles pour rire; La Courte Paille - Colette Herzog (soprano) and Jacques Février (piano) - Deutsche Grammophon, 1963.
- 3 et 6 : Les Nuits d'été; mélodies - Régine Crespin (soprano) and John Wustman (piano) - Decca Records, 1967.
- La Dame de Monte Carlo; La Courte Paille - Mady Mesplé (soprano) and Gabriel Tacchino (piano) - EMI Group, 1986.
- Mélodies - Elly Ameling (soprano) and Dalton Baldwin (piano) - EMI Group, 1991.
- Voyage à Paris - Frederica von Stade (mezzo-soprano) and Martin Katz (piano) - BMG France, 1995.
- Mélodies - Felicity Lott (soprano) and Pascal Rogé (piano) - Decca Records, 1998.
