= Jacques Leguerney =

French composer

Jacques Leguerney (19 November 1906 – 10 September 1997) was a French composer especially noted for his art songs.

== Biography ==
Jacques Leguerney was born in Le Havre. He has been referred to as "the latest – perhaps the last – great exponent of the mélodie".

He was largely self-taught but studied with Nadia Boulanger for a short period. He was also influenced by Albert Roussel and Francis Poulenc, who was a close friend throughout his life.

His art songs were championed by such singers as Gérard Souzay, his sister the soprano Geneviève Touraine and Pierre Bernac, and more recently by American baritone Kurt Ollmann and pianist Mary Dibbern.

In addition to his art songs, he also wrote chamber music and orchestral music, including the ballet Endymion, followed by the ballet La Vénus Noire, which was a commission from the Paris Opéra. After the Paris Opéra did not produce this ballet, which he considered his masterpiece, Leguerney stopped composing.

== Chronological works list ==
- 1928: "D'une fontaine" Philippe Desportes, in "Poèmes de la Pléiade, 8ème Recueil," Editions Max Eschig, 1988.
- 1928: "Le Tombeau de Ronsard" Pierre de Ronsard, in "Poèmes de la Pléiade, 8ème Recueil," Editions Max Eschig, 1988.
- 1928: "Sur la mort de Diane" Philippe Desportes, in "Poèmes de la Pléiade, 8ème Recueil," Editions Max Eschig, 1988.
- 1929: "Avril" Rémy Belleau, in "Poèmes de la Pléiade, 8ème Recueil," Editions Max Eschig, 1988.
- 1930: "Nuit d'été" Albert Samain, in "Quatre Mélodies," Editions Max Eschig, 1988.
- 1942: "Ma douce jouvence est passée" Pierre de Ronsard," in "Poèmes de la Pléiade, 2ème Recueil," Editions Salabert, 1950 and 1989.
- 1942: "Nous ne tenons" Pierre de Ronsard, in "Poèmes de la Pléiade, 7ème Recueil," Editions Max Eschig, 1989.
- 1943: "Au sommeil" Philippe Desportes, in "Poèmes dela Pléiade, 1er Recueil," Editions Salabert, 1950 and 1989.
- 1943: "Genièvres hérissés" Pierre de Ronsard, in "Poèmes de la Pléiade, 1er Recueil," Editions Salabert, 1950 and 1989.
- 1943: "Je me lamente" Pierre de Ronsard, in "Poèmes de la Pléiade, 1er Recueil," Editions Salabert, 1950 and 1989.
- 1943: "Je vous envoie" Pierre de Ronsard, in "Poèmes de la Pléiade, 1er Recueil," Editions Salabert, 1950 and 1989.
- 1943-1947: "Poèmes de la Pléiade", song cycle to texts by Pierre de Ronsard (1524–1585)
- 1948: String Quartet in D
- 1951: "La Solitude", four songs to texts by Théophile de Viau (1590–1626)
- 1952: "Le Carnaval", three songs to texts by Antoine Girard de Saint-Amant (1594–1661)

== Principal source ==
- Mary Dibbern, Carol Kimball, and Patrick Choukroun: The Songs of Jacques Leguerney: A Guide for Study and Performance (New York: Pendragon Press, 2002), ISBN 978-1-57647-016-9.

== Selected discography ==
- Jacques Leguerney: Mélodies de la Renaissance. Mary Dibbern at the piano with Lisa Bonenfant, soprano and Kurt Ollmann, baritone. Harmonia Mundi France —Action Musicale Seita. (HMC 1171, stereo.) Recording made in collaboration with the composer.
- Jacques Leguerney: Mélodies, vol. 2. Mary Dibbern with Deborah Massell, soprano and Kurt Ollmann, baritone. Harmonia Mundi France—Action Musicale Seita. (HMC 1172, stereo.) Recording made in collaboration with the composer.
- 28 Mélodies of Jacques Leguerney. Claves and Radio Suisse Romande-Espace 2 (Claves CD 50–9618). Mary Dibbern with Danielle Borst, soprano: Brigitte Balleys, mezzo-soprano, and Philippe Huttenlocher, baritone.
