= Gérard Souzay =

French opera singer

Gérard Souzay (8 December 1918 – 17 August 2004) was a French baritone, regarded as one of the very finest interpreters of mélodie (French art song) in the generation after Charles Panzéra and Pierre Bernac.

== Background and education ==
He was born Gérard Marcel Tisserand, but later adopted the stage name of Souzay from a village on the river Loire, now part of the commune Souzay-Champigny. He came from a musical family in Angers, France. His parents had met at one of the first performances of Pelléas et Mélisande in 1902; his mother and two brothers were singers, and his sister, 15 years older, was the soprano Geneviève Touraine, who gave the first performance of Poulenc's Fiançailles pour rire in 1942. After his schooling at the Collège Rabelais in Chinon, he went to the Sorbonne in Paris to study philosophy, and while there he met the singer Pierre Bernac, who encouraged him to study singing.

Souzay entered the Paris Conservatoire in 1940, studying with Claire Croiza and Jean-Emil Vanni-Marcoux. He actually began singing as a tenor, but in 1943, with advice from the leading operatic singer Henri Etcheverry, he became a baritone. He graduated from the Conservatoire in 1945 with two first prizes, the Prix de chant and the Prix de vocalise. While at the Conservatoire, he also tried his hand at composition and in 1942 three of his settings of poems by Paul Valéry were given a performance by Pierre Bernac. He went on to study voice with Bernac, although he subsequently expressed some differences with the latter's methods and ideas on pronunciation. He was eager not to limit himself to being a specialist in the French repertoire, and he made a detailed study of German lieder with Lotte Lehmann.

== Career ==
Gérard Souzay's public appearances began in 1945 with recitals and concerts, including a performance of Fauré's Requiem in a centenary tribute to the composer at the Royal Albert Hall in London. He rapidly established an international career as a recitalist, admired not only in French music but also for his command of the German repertoire, especially Schubert and Schumann. In recital, his first accompanist was Jacqueline Bonneau (who had been his contemporary at the Paris Conservatoire), but she was reluctant to travel and from 1954 onwards he formed a close musical and romantic partnership with the American pianist Dalton Baldwin which continued for the rest of his career. The two completed three tours of Southern Africa (1958–1973) to wildly enthusiastic audiences

Souzay's exceptional linguistic gifts enabled him to sing convincingly in 13 different languages including Hebrew, Portuguese and Russian. In contemporary music he performed in Honegger's La danse des morts and in the world première of Stravinsky's Canticum Sacrum. The composer Jacques Leguerney (1906–1997) wrote many songs for Souzay and for his sister. Souzay also sang Jocelyne Binet's Cycle de Mélodies on seven poems by Paul Éluard in a 1955 recital program.

His operatic career began in 1947 in Cimarosa's Il matrimonio segreto at the Festival d'Aix-en-Provence, but it was not until the late 1950s that he extended his stage work – though even then it did not take precedence over his recitals. His roles included Monteverdi's Orfeo, Mozart's Don Giovanni and Almaviva in The Marriage of Figaro, Lescaut in Massenet's Manon, and Méphistophélès in Berlioz's La Damnation de Faust. One of his favorite and most successful roles was Golaud in Debussy's Pelléas et Mélisande.

He did little operatic work after the 1960s, but continued his recital career, finally retiring from performance in the late 1980s. He spent the last years of his life giving master classes in the United States, Europe, and Japan: he was an inspiring teacher, preferring to work on phrasing and the mood of a song rather than French diction.

He was a keen abstract painter, and in 1983 he published a book Sur mon chemin: pensées et dessins in which a selection of his paintings was accompanied by his written commentary, on art and life. He died at his home in Antibes in the south of France on 17 August 2004.

== Recordings ==
Gérard Souzay's first recordings were made in 1944 with the sopranos Germaine Lubin and Geneviève Touraine. (These and some later ones with Elly Ameling were his only recorded duets.) He made other recordings in the 1940s for the small French company Boîte à Musique, and then signed a contract with English Decca. He subsequently recorded for Philips and EMI. A discography of his recordings has been published, listing over 750 titles He participated in complete recordings of the songs of Fauré and Poulenc. On three occasions he won the prestigious Grand Prix du Disque, including one for his recording of the songs of Ravel. Later in his career, he sought to disown his early recordings and to veto the radio from broadcasting them, preferring his later versions of some of the same works. Much to the relief of admirers of the smooth and beautiful quality of his younger voice, he was not widely heeded, and many of his early recordings have been re-released to considerable acclaim.

== Reputation ==
While critics agree the size of the voice was often found wanting, Souzay's musicianship, perfect diction, sense of style (particularly of the French mélodie) and detailed interpretation were never questioned, and found a perfect niche on the recital platform. When Gérard Souzay died he had only been a connoisseur's delight, being somewhat forgotten by audiences and younger singers. On the other hand, the obituary notices were quick in recognising the importance of his contribution to 20th century singing. The Daily Telegraph said that he "rivalled Dietrich Fischer-Dieskau for the title of the greatest lyrical baritone of his age." The New York Times described his voice as "not huge, but rich in color and tone, supple and sensual and lovely." Souzay was "a sensualist, reacting viscerally to the music and allowing it to carry him in new directions in a given concert." The Guardian judged that "the basis of his popularity in recital lay in his easily produced, vibrant, warm baritone. It was used by its owner with an innate sensibility and an unfaltering sense of style. His attractive art was founded, above all, on a very French approach, at once balanced and urbane, yet inwardly poetic."

In the 1950s, Souzay's style of singing became the object of some unexpected criticism when it was cited by Roland Barthes in one of his essays in Mythologies, "L'art vocal bourgeois". Referring to a recording of Fauré songs, Barthes complained that Souzay invested particular words with superfluous emotion by means of an exaggerated phonetic dramatisation, and that by imposing his own "signs" of emotion he stifled the meaning of the words and music. Not everyone has agreed with Barthes's description of the style, let alone with the force of his argument, but these are strictures which would attach to many other singers besides Souzay and go to the heart of how vocal performance should be approached. (Indeed, some years later, Barthes made similar criticisms against the singing of Dietrich Fischer-Dieskau.)

Souzay regarded himself as a romantic. Never analytical or detached in his performances, he said: "For me music is limpid and speaks for itself. I can only offer my emotions when I sing".

== See also ==
- Debussy Mélodies (1980 recording)
