= Amédée-Louis Hettich =

French poet, journalist and musicologist (1856–1937)

Amédée-Louis Hettich, also known as Amédée Landély Hettich and later as Amédée de Hettich (February 5, 1856, Nantes, France – April 5, 1937, Paris, France) was a French poet, singer, journalist, music teacher, and musicologist.

== Biography ==
Amédée-Louis Hettich was born in Nantes on February 5, 1856. He studied singing in the class of the Belgian musician Jean-Jacques Masset at the Conservatoire de Paris.

In 1881, while they were both students at the Conservatoire de Paris, he wanted to marry the composer Mel Bonis, but the composer's family disapproved of the union. Mel Bonis' family promptly arranged for her to marry the (twice) widowed Albert Dommange. She brought up his five children from his previous marriages as well as providing him with three more. The family lived at 60 rue Monceau, in the heart of the Europe district, in the 8th arrondissement of Paris. In 1898, she reconnected with Amédée-Louis Hettich. They had a daughter together, Madeleine, who was born on September 7, 1899.

On December 3, 1883, Amédée-Louis Hettich performed one of Mel Bonis's melodies, Sur la plage !, for which he had written the lyrics. The event took place at Moscow, at an event which was probably hosted by the composer Adolphe Blanc.

As a poet, he was the muse of Mel Bonis. As a music critic, he wrote for L'Art musical. He wrote critiques of Georges Bizet's Les Pêcheurs de perles, Vincenzo Bellini's I puritani, Jules Massenet's Esclarmonde, Charles Gounod's Mireille, Gaetano Donizetti's Lucia di Lammermoor, Victorin de Joncières's Dimitri, Camille Saint-Saëns's Ascanio, Benjamin Godard's Dante et Béatrice, Alfred Bruneau's Le Rêve, and Ernest Reyer's Sigurd. He also proposed a French adaptation of the Neapolitan love song 'O sole mio, famously sung by Tino Rossi.

Hettich taught singing at the Conservatoire de Paris. Among his students were Madeleine Grey, Charles Panzéra, Arthur Endrèze, and Erling Krogh.

In 1906 Amédée-Landely Hettich began compiling and eventually published a project of vocal exercises-studies in several volumes. This project spanned nearly 30 years and brought together more than 150 works by composers.

He was made a Knight of the Légion d'Honneur in 1922.

He died on April 5, 1937, eighteen days after Mel Bonis.

== Works ==
- Vers à chanter, 1899

== Bibliography ==
- Jardin, Étienne (2020). Mel Bonis (1858–1937) : parcours d'une compositrice de la Belle Époque. ISBN 978-2-330-13313-9. OCLC 1153996478.
