= Mel Bonis =

French composer (1858–1937)

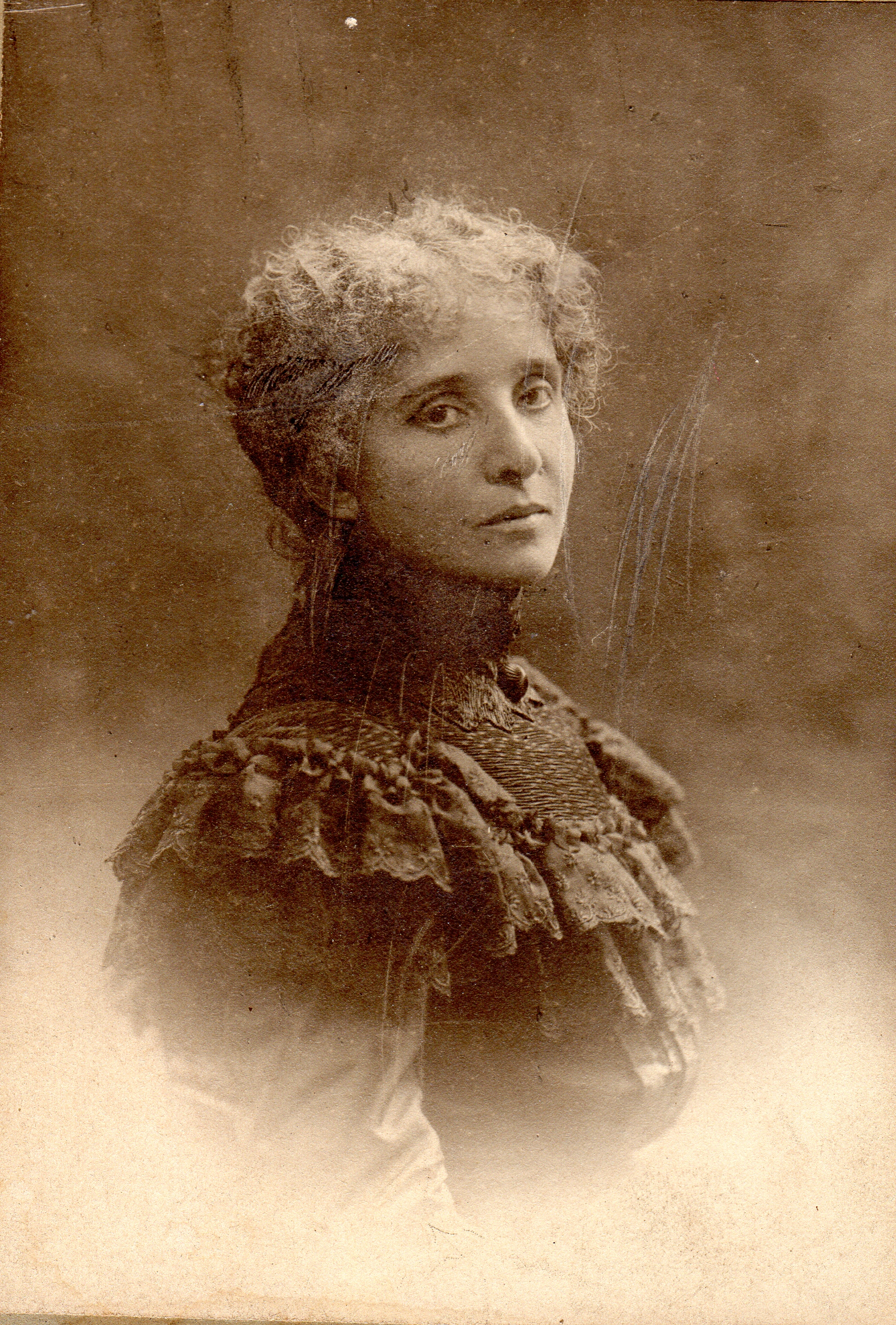
Bonis at about age 50, photo c. 1908

Mélanie Hélène "Mel" Bonis (21 January 1858 – 18 March 1937) was a prolific French late-Romantic composer. She wrote more than 300 pieces, including works for piano solo and four hands, organ pieces, chamber music, mélodies, choral music, a mass, and works for orchestra. She attended the Paris Conservatoire, where her teachers included César Franck, Ernest Guiraud, and Auguste Bazille.

== Life ==
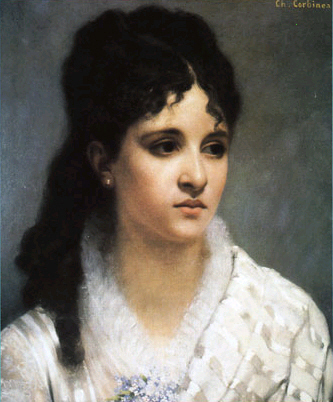
Mel Bonis at age 19, painting by Charles-Auguste Corbineau (1877).

Bonis was born to a Parisian lower-middle-class family and was educated according to the strict norms of Catholic morality. Endowed with great talent and musical sensitivity, she taught herself to play the piano. Initially, her parents did not encourage her music, but when she was twelve they were persuaded by a professor at the Conservatoire to allow her to receive formal music lessons. In 1874, at the age of sixteen, she began her studies at the Conservatoire, and attended classes in accompaniment, harmony, and composition, where she shared the benches with Claude Debussy and Gabriel Pierné and received tuition from César Franck.

At the Conservatoire, she met and fell in love with Amédée Landély Hettich (5 February 1856 – 5 April 1937), a student, poet, and singer, setting some of his poems to music. Her parents disapproved of the match and withdrew her from the Conservatoire. In 1883, when she was twenty-five, they arranged for her to marry the businessman Albert Domange (4 April 1836 – 31 March 1918). Domange was twenty-two years her senior, and twice a widower with five children from his previous marriages. After marriage, Bonis immersed herself in domesticity, bearing three children with Domange: Pierre (1884–1969), Jeanne (1888–1987) and Édouard (1893–1932). For Bonis, it was not an ideal marriage, as Domange did not like music.

In the 1890s, Bonis re-encountered Hettich, who was by then a respected vocal teacher and writer on music, married to a Polish harpist. Hettich encouraged Bonis to return to composition and was able to introduce her to some of the major publishers, after which her career began to succeed. Bonis and Hettich embarked on an affair, which led to the birth of an illegitimate child, Madeleine (Jeanne-Pauline-Madeleine Verger), on 8 September 1899. Madeleine was put into the care of a former chambermaid; she inherited musical talent from her parents.

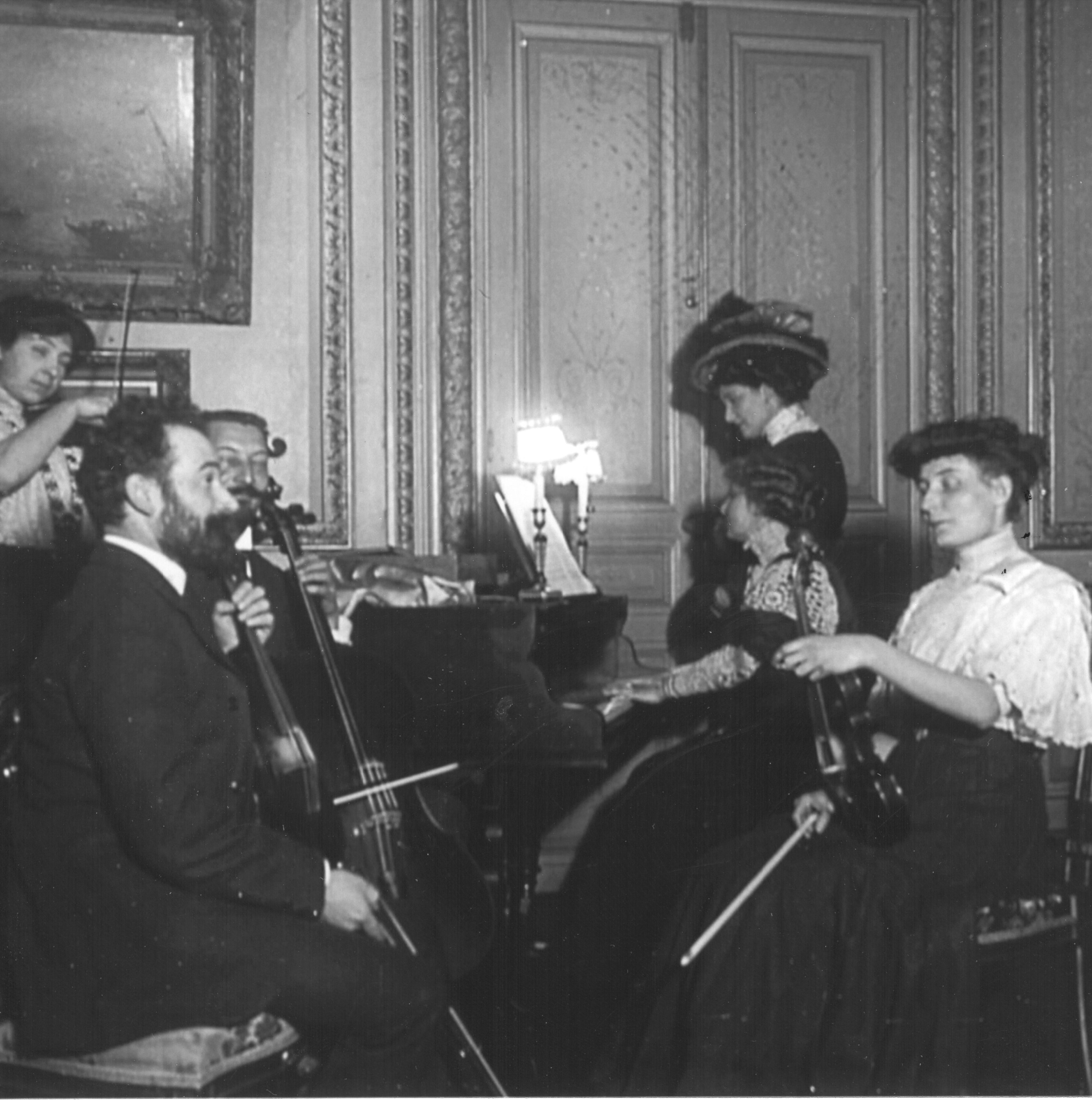
A music salon at the home of Mel Bonis, 1910

Bonis then devoted all her energies to composition. Her piano quartet was performed in 1901, and when he heard it, Saint-Saens exclaimed, "I never imagined a woman could write such music!". On 22 April 1905, she received an 'honourable mention' for her (now lost) Suite pour harpe chromatique et deux instruments à vent. In 1907, she became a member of the committee of the Société des compositeurs de musique and, from 1910 to 1914, its secretary. Some of her works were published by Éditions Alphonse Leduc.

In 1912, after the death of his wife, Hettich acknowledged that he was Madeleine's father. Domange died on 31 March 1918, whereupon Bonis assumed care of Madeleine, whose foster mother had also died. Upon his demobilisation from service in World War I, Bonis’ son Édouard began to form a romantic relationship with Madeleine, forcing Bonis to reveal their familial relationship, on pain of strict secrecy. In 1923, Madeleine married Pierre Quinet.

Bonis was too modest for self-promotion, and even her admirers at the time did not overlook her gender. After the First World War, her music fell into obscurity, and she became bedridden from arthritis. She continued to compose through the late 1920s, until her death in 1937, aged 79. Hettich died a month later. Bonis died in Sarcelles, Val-d'Oise, and is buried in Cimetière de Montmartre, Paris.

An 84-page autobiographical book of personal reflections, "Souvenirs et Réflexions", was published by her daughter, Jeanne Brochot (née Domange), through 'les éditions du Nant d'enfer', Évian, in 1974. Recordings of her orchestral works were released by both CPO and Chandos in 2026.

== Compositions ==
=== Chamber music ===
- Suite en trio, for flute, violin and piano, Op. 59 (1903)
- Fantaisie en septuor, for 2 flutes, 2 violins, viola, cello, and piano, Op. 72 (1906)
- Scènes de la forêt, for flute, horn and piano, Op. 123 (1928)
- Suite dans le style ancien, for flute, violin and piano, Op. 127 No. 1 (1928)
- Suite orientale, Op. 48, for violin, cello and piano (1900)
- Soir, matin, Op. 76, for violin, cello and piano (1907)
- Nocturne, for violin, viola, cello and harp or piano (1892)
- Quatuor pour piano et cordes en si bémol, Op. 69 (1905)
- Quatuor pour piano et cordes en ré, Op. 124 (1927)
- Flute Sonata in C♯ minor, Op. 64 (1904)
- Cello Sonata in F major, Op. 67 (1905)
- Violin Sonata in F♯ minor, Op. 112 (1914)
- Many more pieces for violin and piano, flute and piano, cello and piano

=== Music for piano ===
Modern edition in eleven volumes published by Furore:

- Volume 1: Femmes de légende (Legendary Women)
- Volumes 2, 3 and 7: Pièces pittoresques et poétiques (Picturesque and Poetic Pieces), A, B and C (1895-1905)
- Volume 4: Concert pieces
- Volumes 5, 10 and 11: Danses A, B and C
- Volumes 6 and 8: Piano à quatre mains A and B A
- Volume 9: Deux pianos à quatre main, Scherzo Op. 40 and Variations Op. 85

=== Children's music ===
- Children's Scenes, Op. 92 (1912)
- Miocheries, Op. 126 (1928)
- Neuf Pièces faciles, Op. 148 (1936)
- 17 Pièces enfantines, Op. 116 (1926)
- Album pour les tout petits, Op. 103 (1913)

=== Organ music ===
- L'Œuvre pour orgue, 27 pieces, with Toccata, Cantabile, Choral, etc. (modern edition: Éditions Fortin-Armiane)

=== Vocal music ===
Melodies 35 melodies. Modern edition: Éditions Fortin-Armiane (France). For instance, Elève-toi, mon âme, fr:Chanson d'amour, Dès l'aube, Immortelle tendresse, Le chat sur le toit, La mer, Noël pastoral, Pourriez-vous pas me dire?, Un soir, Chanson de printemps, Berceuse, Chanson catalane, Reproche tendre, Villanelle, Viola, Sauvez-moi de l'amour, Vers le pur amour, Bolero, Épithalame, Le Ruisseau, L'oiseau bleu, Madrigal, etc.

- Volume 1: low and middle voices
- Volume 2: high and middle voices
- Volume 3: 2 or more voices

See also: Sur la plage !

Vocal religious music

- Regina Cœli, Op. 45; Cantique de Jean Racine, Messe à la Sérénité, and many motets such as Adoro te, Inviolata etc. (modern edition: Éditions Fortin-Armiane)(1901)

=== Orchestra ===
- Les Gitanos, Op. 15 No. 3 (orchestration by Ad. Gauwin)(1891)
- Suite en forme de valses (1895)
- Suite Orientale, Op. 48 (1900), includes Prélude, Op. 48 No. 1
- Bourrée, Pavane, Sarabande (1909)
- Trois Femmes de légende: Salome, Op. 100 No. 2 (1909); Ophelia, Op. 165 No. 2 (1909); The Dream of Cleopatra, Op. 180 No. 2 (modern edition: Furore)

=== Wind and percussions for youth ===
- Burlesque Symphony, Op. 185, posthumous: ballad (published by Fortin)
