= Charles-Auguste Corbineau =

French painter

Auguste Charles Corbineau, better known as Charles-Auguste Corbineau, 1835 - 1901, was a French painter.

== Biography ==
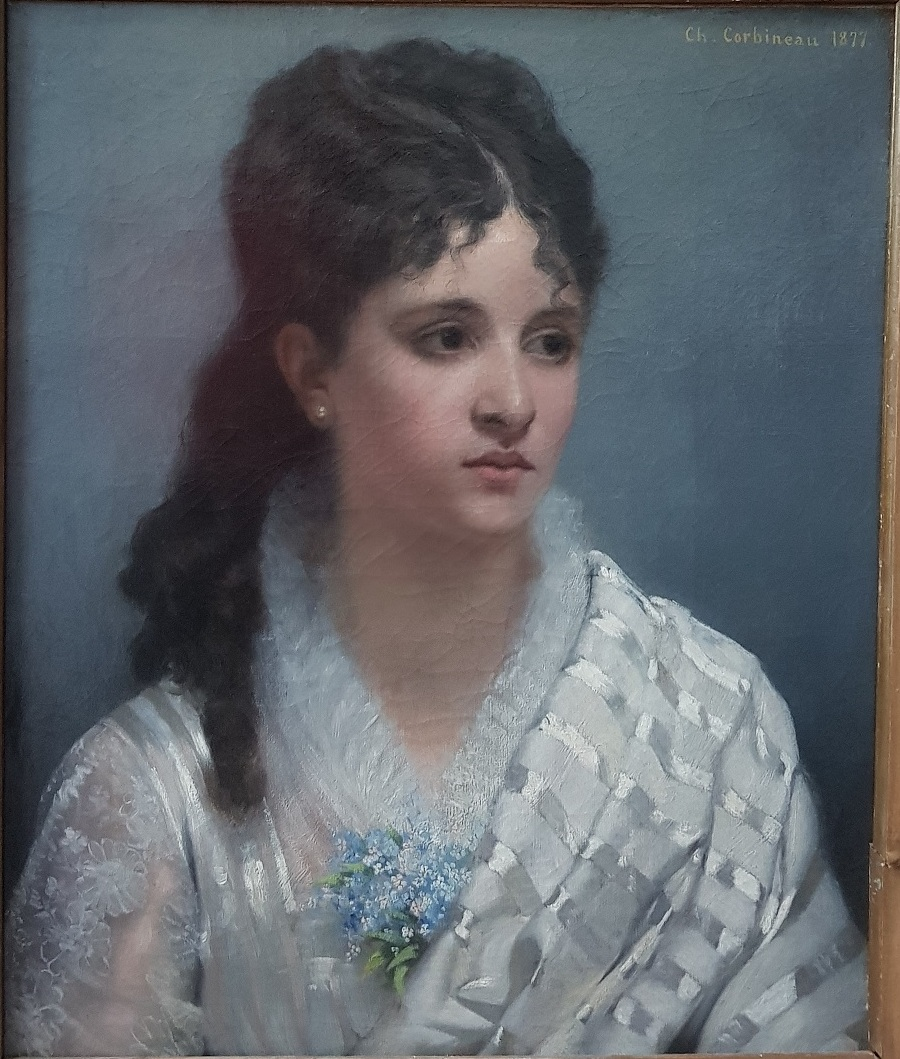
Charles-Auguste Corbineau: Portrait of the composer Mel Bonis aged 19, 1877

Charles-Auguste Corbineau was born on December 25, 1835, in Saumur, Maine-et-Loire, to Auguste Corbineau (1813-1844), a bone turner, and Joséphine Leroy (1812-1880), a seamstress.

He studied painting under Ernest Hébert.

He exhibited at the Salon of 1876.

Corbineau died on March 20, 1901, in Paris.

He notably painted a portrait of Pierre-Joseph Proudhon, as well as a portrait of the composer Mel Bonis.
