= Cinq poèmes de Charles Baudelaire =

Song cycle composed by Claude Debussy

- Song cycle by Claude Debussy
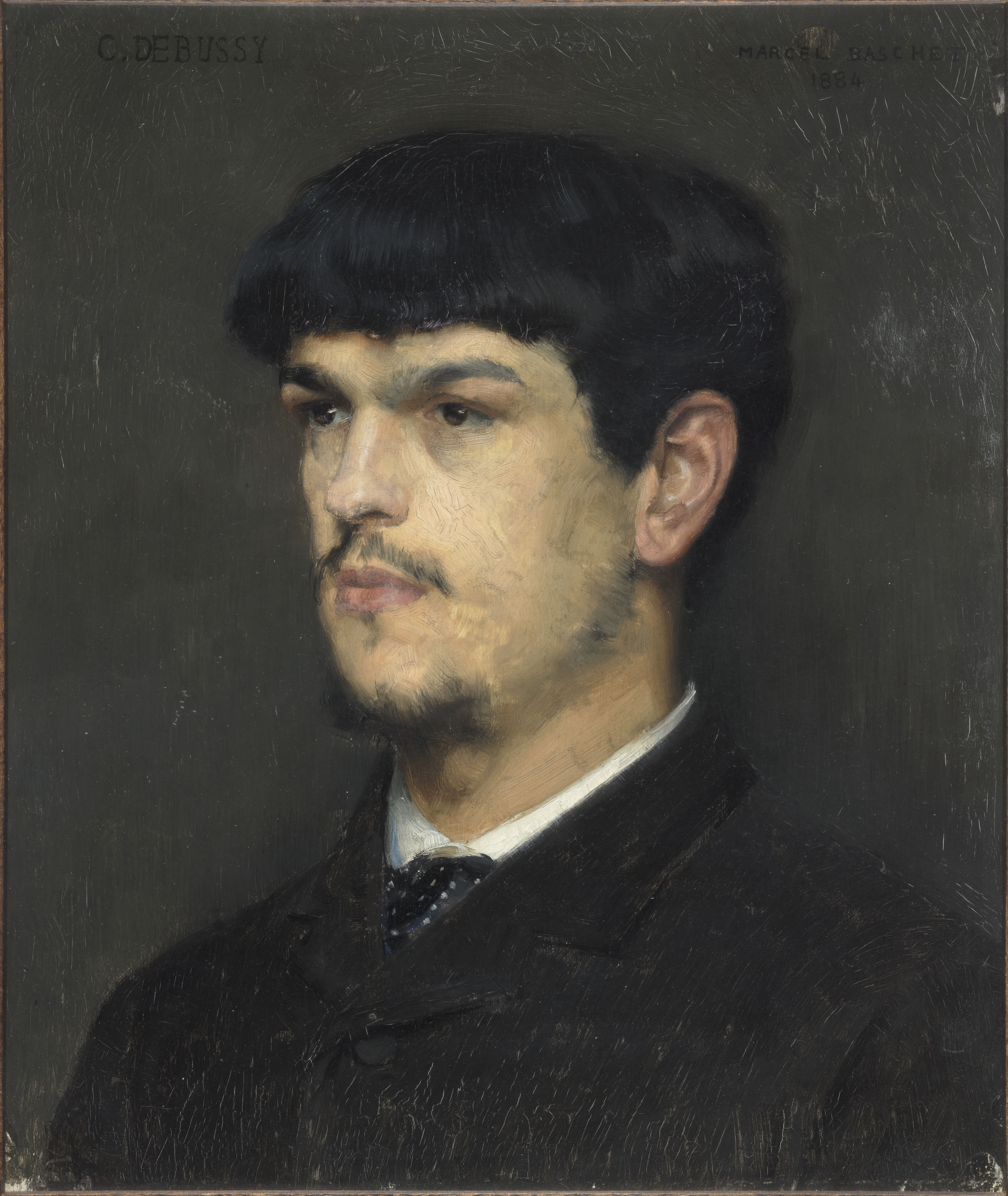
- The composer in 1884, portrayed by Marcel Baschet
- Catalogue: L. 64
- Text: poems by Charles Baudelaire
- Language: French
- Composed: 1887–89
- Movements: five
- Scoring: voice; piano

The Cinq poèmes de Charles Baudelaire (L 64) constitute a song cycle for voice and piano by Claude Debussy, on poems taken from Les Fleurs du mal by Charles Baudelaire. Composed from December 1887 to March 1889, these five highly developed vocal pieces were not well received by Parisian musical circles because of the Wagnerian influence they revealed.

This aesthetic, following on from the harmonic innovations of Tristan und Isolde, was gradually abandoned by Debussy, addressing the composition of Pelléas et Mélisande. Thus, the Cinq poèmes de Charles Baudelaire represent a particular moment of the musical evolution of Debussy. Musicologists agree that it is "a work of crisis and transition."

== Songs ==
1. "Le Balcon"
2. "Harmonie du soir"
3. "Le jet d'eau"
4. "Recueillement"
5. "La mort des amants"

== Composition ==
The composition of the Cinq poèmes de Charles Baudelaire extended over more than a year: "La mort des amants" was completed in December 1887, "Le balcon" in January 1888, "Harmonie du soir" in January 1889, and "Le jet d'eau" in March of the same year. "Recueillement" is an undated melody. Debussy transcribed "Le jet d'eau" for voice and orchestra in 1907.

== Publication ==
The work was ill received by Parisian musical circles. After the success of Ariettes oubliées, nobody wanted to edit or perform the Cinq poèmes de Charles Baudelaire, according to Jean Barraqué. Debussy was reduced to publishing an edition of his melodies by subscription, with only 150 copies.
