= Auguste Bazille =

French composer and organist

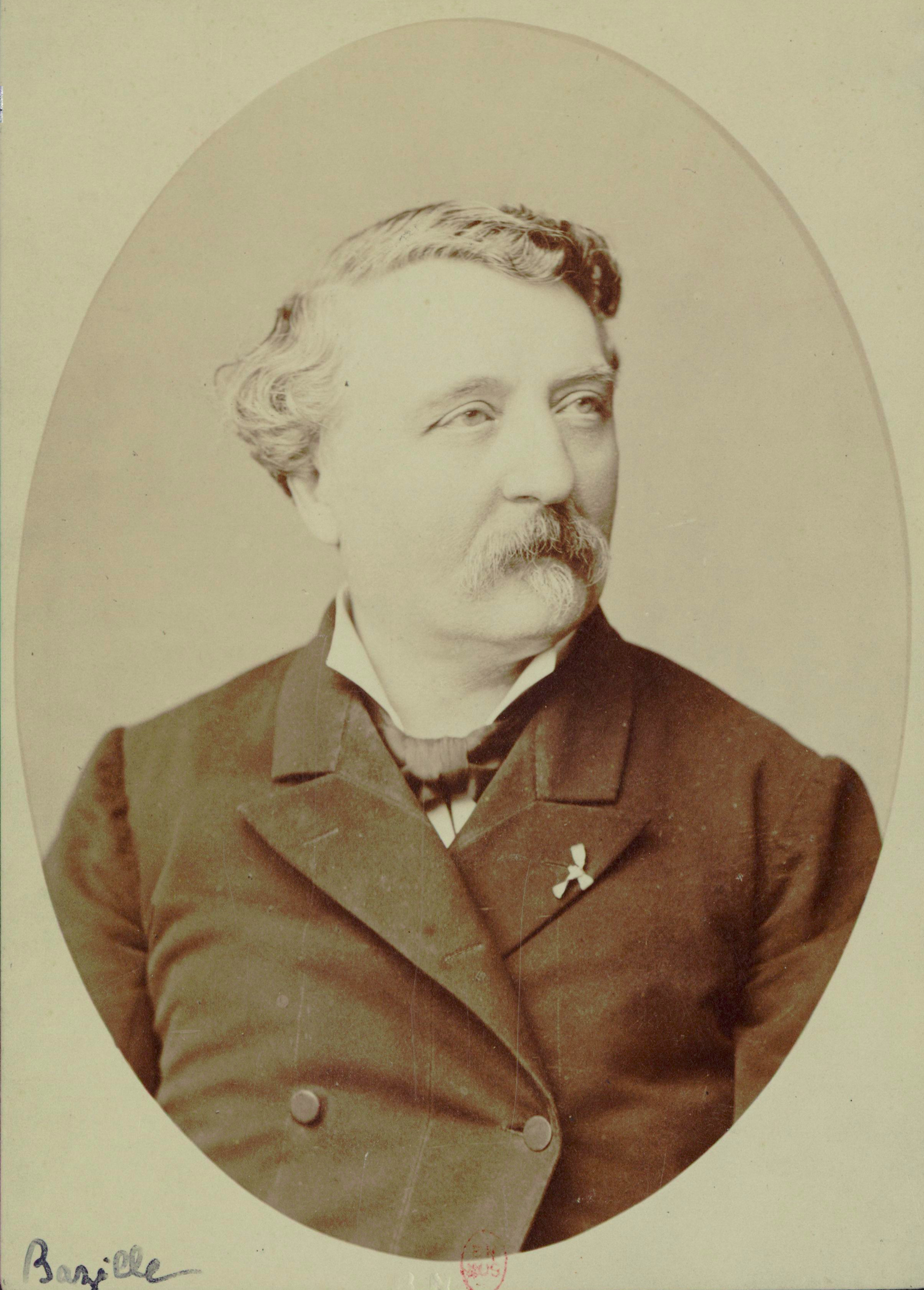
- Born: 27 May 1828; Paris, France
- Died: 18 April 1891 (aged 62); Bois-Colombes, France
- Occupations: Organist, composer, professor.

Auguste Bazille (27 May 1828 – 18 April 1891) was a French organist, composer, and professor of music.

== Career ==
Auguste Bazille was a brilliant student at the Conservatoire de Paris (1st prize in music theory, 1841; harmony 1845; fugue, 1846; organ, 1847; 2nd Grand Prix de Rome). He led a triple career as an organist, "chef de chant" at the Opéra-Comique, and professor of practical harmony and accompaniment at the Conservatoire.

Appointed to the new Suret organ at the église Sainte-Élisabeth-de-Hongrie in Paris in 1853, he was a close friend of Suret (best man at Augustus Suret's marriage in 1855). He inaugurated several of their instruments from 1848. An appreciated improviser, he was often called for organ inaugurations in Paris and in the provinces (église Saint-Sulpice Paris, 1862, Saint-Eustache, Paris, 1854, église Saint-Germain-des-Prés Paris, and Rouen, Toulouse, Nancy ...).

As "chef de chant" at the Opéra-Comique, he was close to the Parisian milieu of opera and opéra comique. In particular, he was a close friend of Charles Gounod and Georges Bizet (he played the organ for the funeral of Bizet), of Louis James Alfred Lefébure-Wély (he played the organ at the wedding of his daughter).

Bazille reduced numerous opera scores of the nineteenth century, from Adam to Wagner, to vocal scores (for voice and piano). He also wrote a few original compositions for voice, piano and harmonium.

As a teacher of practical harmony at the piano (piano accompaniment), Bazille had many students, the most famous among them being the composers Claude Debussy and Mélanie Bonis.

== Bibliography ==
- Joël-Marie Fauquet (ed.): Dictionnaire de la musique en France au XIXe (Paris: Fayard, 2003).
- Christophe d'Alessandro: "Orgues, Musiques et Musiciens à Sainte-Élisabeth", La Flûte Harmonique, no. 91 (2010). https://hal.science/hal-02360434v1
