= Fêtes galantes (Debussy) =

Cycle of six mélodies by Claude Debussy

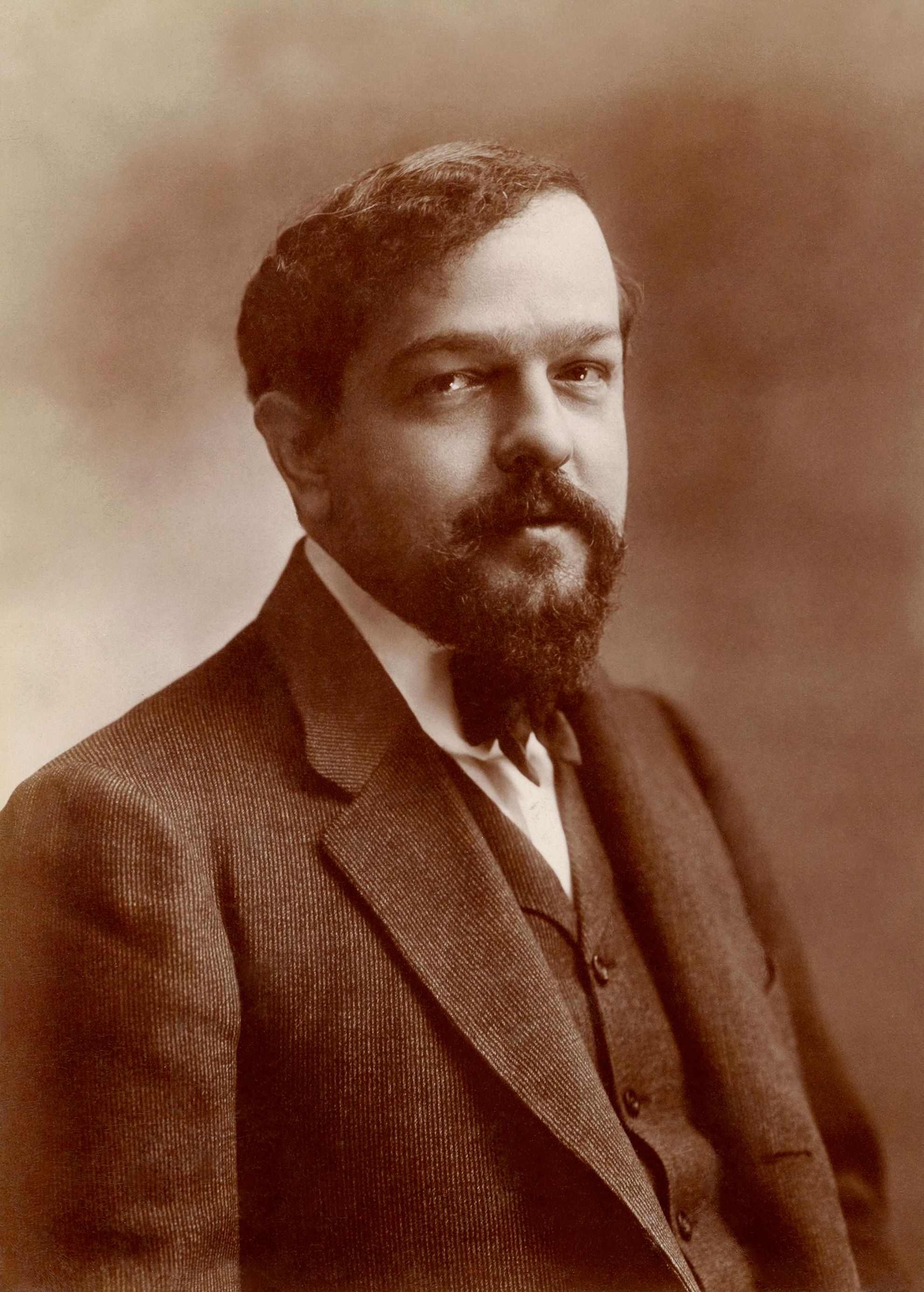
Claude Debussy c. 1900 by Nadar

Fêtes Galantes is a cycle of six mélodies composed by Claude Debussy to poems by Paul Verlaine. It consists of two books of three songs (FL 86 and FL 114). The songs were composed over several years, and were premiered in 1904.

== History and analysis ==
The six poems come from Verlaine's collection Fêtes galantes, published in 1869. Debussy, a lifelong admirer of Verlaine's poetry, had taken a copy of the collection with him when he went to study in Rome in 1885. Although other composers, from Gabriel Fauré to Benjamin Britten set Verlaine's poetry, Debussy, according to the Grove Dictionary of Music and Musicians, was the first composer of any importance to do so.

The critic Jacques-Henri Bornecque called Verlaine's book a "petite suite"; it contains twenty-two poems, mostly quite brief, representing varied scenes or encounters ranging from tender to ironic, inspired by Antoine Watteau's Fête galante paintings.

=== First book ===
- En sourdine (Muted)
- Fantoches (Puppets)
- Clair de lune (Moonlight)

=== Second book ===
- Les Ingénus (The innocents)
- Le Faune (The faun)
- Colloque sentimental (Sentimental conversation)

=== Analysis ===
In his 1874 poem "Art poétique" Verlaine had written "Music before all else, And for that choose the irregular, Vaguer and melting better into the air." (Note: "De la musique avant toute chose, Et pour cela préfère l'Impair Plus vague et plus soluble dans l'air") The analyst Katja Pfeifer comments that Verlaine's dictum becomes "a literary reality" in the first set of Debussy's settings of Fêtes galantes: "the rhythm of the verses, his playing with the sound of the language, and explicit textual references to music give the verses themselves the feel of a song".

Debussy completed the first book (FL 86) in 1891. The manuscript of the score shows two songs, "Pantomime" and "Mandolin", which were later removed; they were later published separately. The score was published in 1903 and the songs were first performed at the house of Madame Édouard Colonne on 16 June 1904.

Debussy had already set all three of the poems in the first book in 1882. The earlier settings were composed for his mistress, Marie Vasnier. The settings in his Fêtes galantes cycle contained some material from the earlier versions, mostly in "Fantoches", although in that song the composer replaced the original flamboyant and virtuosic ending with a gradual diminuendo, which became a frequent feature of his style. "En sourdine" and "Clair de lune" are almost completely rewritten. The musicologist Roger Nichols writes that they display "a far more adventurous harmonic palette" than the composer had developed at the time of the first settings, "blending modality and chromaticism in equal measure". Nichols describes "Fantoches" as energetic and sparkling, contrasting with the first and third songs, which "float timelessly, allowing us to savour the famous 'musicality' of Verlaine’s poetry". The analyst Susan Youens writes that the outer songs are the " inward, melancholy visions of those who already sense, even in the midst of seeming love and luck, that 'la vie opportune' has passed".

The second book (FL 114), dedicated to Emma Bardac, dates from 1904. It was premiered chez Madame Colonne on 23 June 1904; the score was published in September of that year. These were Debussy's only settings of these three Verlaine poems. Unlike the first book, where the three songs are not connected by a common narrative thread, the second book has a continuous theme of the difficulty of relationships between men and women. Youens writes of "the mutual incomprehensibility of the sexes, from its inception ('Les Ingénus') to its death-in-life ('Le Faune') and finally to its grim remains after death ('Colloque sentimental')".
