= Théodore de Banville =

French poet and writer (1823–1891)

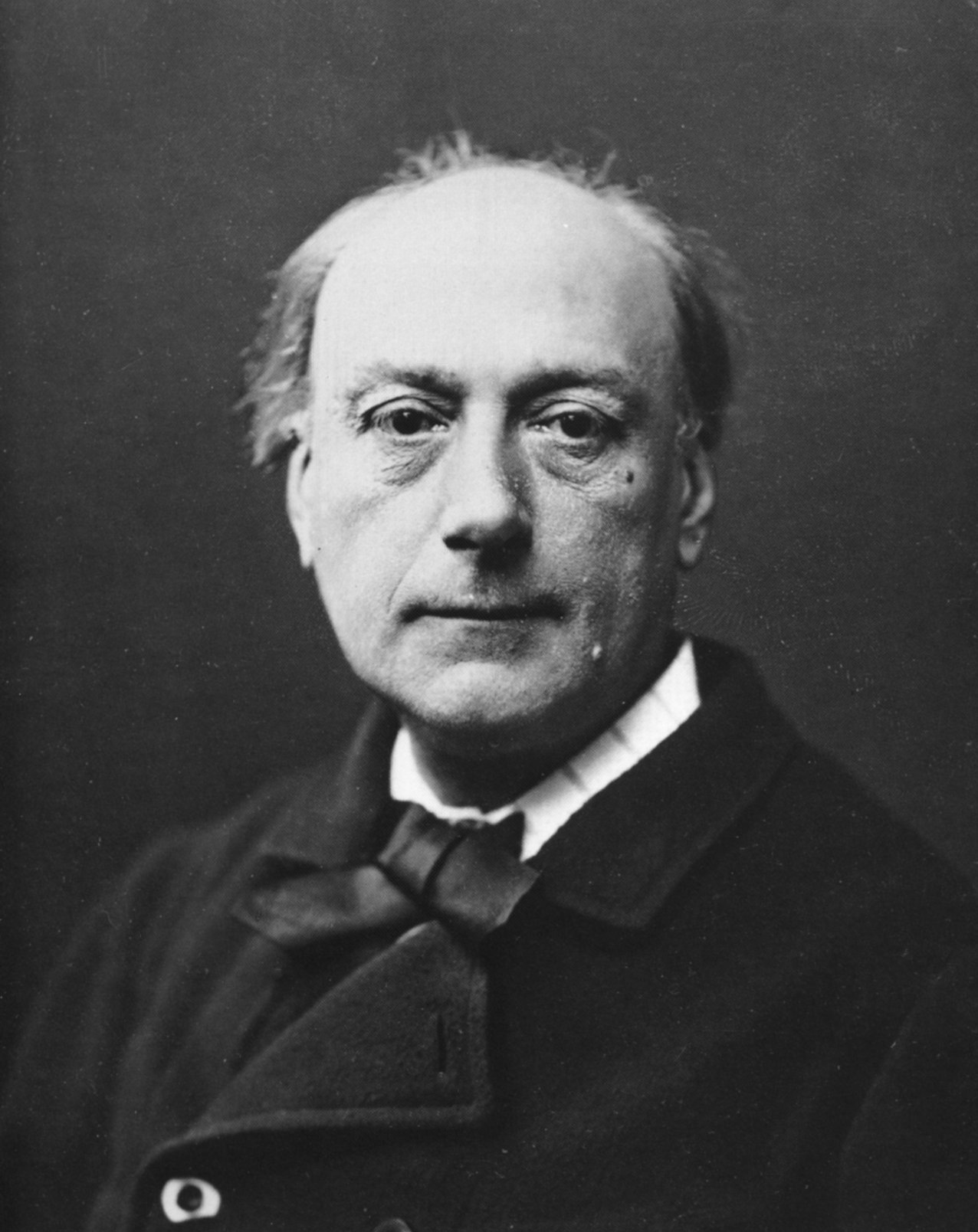
- Banville, photograph by Nadar
- Born: 14 March 1823
- Died: 13 March 1891 (aged 67)

Étienne Jean Baptiste Claude Théodore Faullain de Banville (French pronunciation: [teɔdɔʁ folɛ̃ də bɑ̃vil]; 14 March 1823 – 13 March 1891) was a French poet and writer. His work was influential on the Symbolist movement in French literature in the late 19th century.

== Biography ==
Banville was born in Moulins in Allier, Auvergne, the son of a captain in the French navy. His boyhood, by his own account, was cheerlessly passed at a lycée in Paris; he was not harshly treated, but took no part in the amusements of his companions. On leaving school with but slender means of support, he devoted himself to letters, and in 1842 published his first volume of verse (Les Cariatides), which was followed by Les Stalactites in 1846. The poems encountered some adverse criticism, but secured for their author the approbation and friendship of Alfred de Vigny and Jules Janin.

From then on, Banville's life was steadily devoted to literary production and criticism. He printed other volumes of verse, among which the Odes funambulesques (1857) received unstinted praise from Victor Hugo, to whom they were dedicated. Later, several comedies in verse were produced at the Théâtre Français and on other stages; and from 1853 onwards a stream of prose flowed from his industrious pen, including studies of Parisian manners, sketches of well-known persons, and a series of tales, most of which were republished in his collected works (1875–1878). He also wrote freely for reviews, and acted as dramatic critic for more than one newspaper. Throughout a life spent mainly in Paris, Banville's genial character and cultivated mind won him the friendship of the chief men of letters of his time.

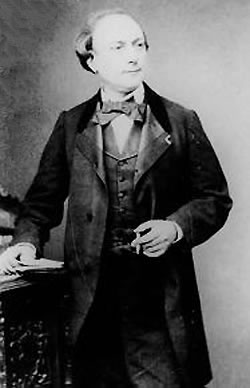
Théodore de Banville

== Legacy ==
In 1858 Banville was made a Chevalier de la Légion d'honneur, and was promoted to an Officier de la Légion d'honneur in 1886. He died in Paris in 1891 at the age of 68, and was buried in Montparnasse Cemetery.

There is a street named after him in the 17th Arrondissement in Paris. There is also a street named Theodore de Banville in Nice, France.

French Impressionist composer Claude Debussy used many of Banville's poems for his art songs, including "Nuit d'étoiles" and "Zéphyr."

German composer Georgina Schubert (1840-1878) used Banville's text for her lieder "L'ame d'un ange."
