= Pierre Bernac =

French opera singer (1899–1979)

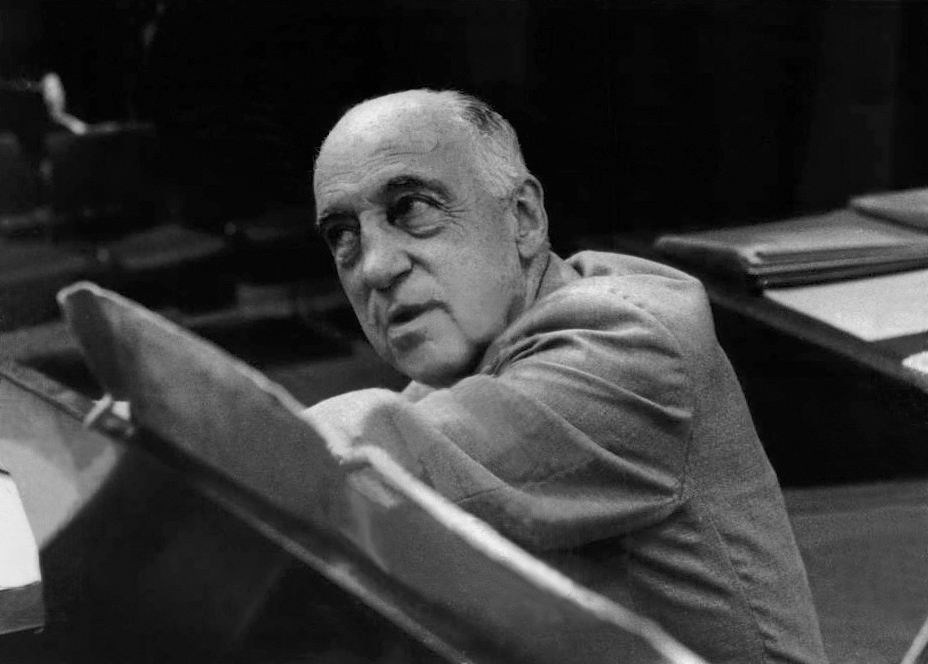
- Bernac in 1968
- Born: 12 January 1899; Paris, France
- Died: 17 October 1979; Villeneuve-lès-Avignon, France
- Occupation(s): Singer, teacher and writer

Pierre Louis Bernac (né Bertin; 12 January 1899 – 17 October 1979) was a French singer, a baryton-martin, known as an interpreter of the French mélodie. He had a close artistic association with Francis Poulenc, with whom he performed in France and abroad. Poulenc wrote 90 songs for him during their 25-year musical partnership.

Bernac was well known as a teacher; among the singers who studied with him were Elly Ameling, Grace Bumbry, Mattiwilda Dobbs, Carol Neblett, Jessye Norman and Gérard Souzay. He gave masterclasses in France, Britain and the US.

In retirement, Bernac wrote two highly regarded books about the interpretation of mélodies in general and Poulenc's in particular.

== Life and career ==
=== Early years ===
Born Pierre Bertin in Paris on 12 January 1899, he started his working career in his father's brokerage house. He later changed his surname to Bernac to avoid confusion with the actor Pierre Bertin. He began taking singing lessons at the age of 18, and was first taught by the composer André Caplet. He was later coached by Yvonne Gouverné, who accompanied him at his first recital, in Paris, in 1925. He studied German lieder with Reinhold von Warlich in Salzburg, but it was as an interpreter of French mélodie that he became best known.

Bernac's name came to be closely linked with that of the composer and pianist Francis Poulenc. They gave the first performance of Poulenc's Chansons gaillardes in 1926, but it was another eight years before they worked together again. In 1933 Bernac made the first of only two excursions into opera, as Pelléas in Pélleas et Mélisande at the Théâtre des Champs-Elysées. His only other operatic appearance was in the same role in Geneva, conducted by Ernest Ansermet in 1936.

In 1934 Bernac, visiting the Salzburg Festival, was asked at short notice to give a Debussy recital. Having no accompanist and knowing that Poulenc was in Salzburg, Bernac sent him a three-line note: "I have been asked to sing some Debussy in three days' time. Would you agree to accompany me? Handsome fee, give me your reply quickly". Poulenc agreed, and they found their musical rapport so great that they decided to form a musical partnership.

=== Partnership with Poulenc ===
Francis Poulenc (1920s picture)

Bernac and Poulenc introduced their partnership to Paris at the École normale de musique on 3 April 1935, when they gave the premiere of Poulenc's Cinq poèmes de Paul Eluard. They continued to perform together for 25 years, in France and abroad, until Bernac retired. They built up a repertory, based on Poulenc's own songs, but also exploring the works of other prominent French songwriters from the 17th to the 20th centuries, and including songs by Brahms, Mompou, Schubert, Schumann, Verdi and others.

They began performing outside France quite soon after launching their partnership: in November 1935 they performed at the French embassy in London at a reception for the Duke and Duchess of York, the following year they broadcast the first of many recitals together on the BBC, and their first British tour, in 1939, took in four cities in addition to London. The Second World War delayed their American debut until 1948; The New York Times said of Bernac, "the integrity and elegance of his singing quickly won him a following among connoisseurs of art song interpretation".

Poulenc wrote 90 songs for Bernac, "his style influenced by the baritone's peculiarly refined artistry", according to Grove's Dictionary of Music and Musicians. Although Bernac avoided the operatic stage after 1936, Poulenc relied on him for technical advice on vocal matters when writing his opera Dialogues des Carmélites, and his late Gloria. Poulenc said that his association with Bernac was the reason why he wrote so many songs. "No one will ever sing them better than Bernac, who knows the inner secrets of my music. It was also through accompanying him in Schubert, Schumann, Fauré, Debussy and Ravel that I learnt my trade as a melodist." Other composers who wrote for Bernac include, from France, André Jolivet, Henri Sauguet and Jean Françaix; from Germany, Paul Hindemith; from England, Lennox Berkeley; and from the US, Samuel Barber.

Bernac retired from the concert platform in 1959, when he was 60.

=== Teacher ===
While still active as a singer, Bernac was also a teacher. In Grove's Dictionary, Alan Blyth says of Bernac, "Among his many pupils the most distinguished was Gérard Souzay, whose style owed much to Bernac's example". Others who studied with Bernac include Elly Ameling, Grace Bumbry, Mattiwilda Dobbs, Carol Neblett and Jessye Norman. The Musical Times called him "an outstanding teacher of song interpretation – visionary, precise, tireless and loving." In retirement, Bernac conducted masterclasses in France, Britain and the US and was on the faculty of the American Conservatory, Fontainebleau.

=== Writer ===
==== The Interpretation of French Song (1970) ====
Bernac wrote two books: The Interpretation of French Song (1970) and Francis Poulenc: The Man and His Songs (1977). He wrote the first in English for the guidance of English-speaking singers. (Note: Bernac wrote the English prose; his former pupil Winifred Radford (1901–1993) supplied line-by-line English translations of the French verses.) He explained in his preface that he had space for only the most outstanding composers; nevertheless the book covers 200 mélodies by 18 composers, from Berlioz to Poulenc, via Gounod, Franck, Lalo, Saint-Saëns, Delibes, Bizet, Massenet, Duparc, Chabrier, Chausson, Fauré, Debussy, Satie, Caplet, Roussel and Ravel.

In the first of the three introductory chapters Bernac describes the role of the concert singer and the significance of "interpretation" – bringing the words and music to life through imagination and personal vision, with unceasing respect for the composer's indications and for the inseparability of the text and its music. The second chapter consists of technical advice on French vowel and consonant sounds and their proper vocal production. The third analyses the differences between the French mélodie and the German lied. The bulk of the book consists of analyses of the various composers' techniques, with detailed advice to singers. The reviewer in the American journal Notes called the book a masterpiece, and his counterpart in the British Music & Letters called it "a 'must' for any serious student of the French repertory".

==== Francis Poulenc: The Man and His Songs (1977) ====
The second book was written in French, but first published in English translation. In 1977 Gollancz in London and Norton in New York published a translation by Winifred Radford. The original French text was published in Paris by Buchet-Chastel the following year as Francis Poulenc et ses mélodies. Bernac used an approach similar to that in his earlier book: a short biographical study of Poulenc is followed by a discussion of the composer's style and the singer's approach to it, and the bulk of the book considers the songs individually, grouped by the various poets' names. Reviewing the English edition, The Musical Times said "This is not just a book about Poulenc songs. With its fine literary style … it is an unselfconscious exposé of the spirit of being French, and an object lesson in how to approach any musical repertory with a high degree of rationale, but above all a warm heart". The English edition has a preface by Sir Lennox Berkeley and the French by Henri Sauguet.

=== Last years and legacy ===
Bernac did not marry and had no children. He died, following a series of heart attacks, in Villeneuve-lès-Avignon on 17 October 1979, aged 80.

The Friends of the Académie Ravel in Saint-Jean-de-Luz awards the Pierre Bernac Prize in Song (Prix de chant Pierre Bernac). In 1980 Berkeley became the first president of "The Friends of Pierre Bernac", a charitable trust set up to promote the reissue of Bernac's recordings.

== Notes, references and sources ==
=== Sources ===
- Poulenc, Francis (2014). Nicolas Southon (ed.). Articles and Interviews – Notes from the Heart. Translated by Roger Nichols. Farnham, Surrey: Ashgate. ISBN 978-1-4094-6622-2.
- Schmidt, Carl B (2001). Entrancing Muse: A Documented Biography of Francis Poulenc. Hillsdale, US: Pendragon Press. ISBN 978-1-57647-026-8.
- Slonimsky, Nicholas; Laura Kuhn; Dennis McIntire (2001). "Bernac, Pierre". In Laura Kuhn (ed.). Baker's Biographical Dictionary of Musicians (8th ed.). New York: Schirmer. ISBN 978-0-02-866091-2.
