= Charles Panzéra =

French opera singer

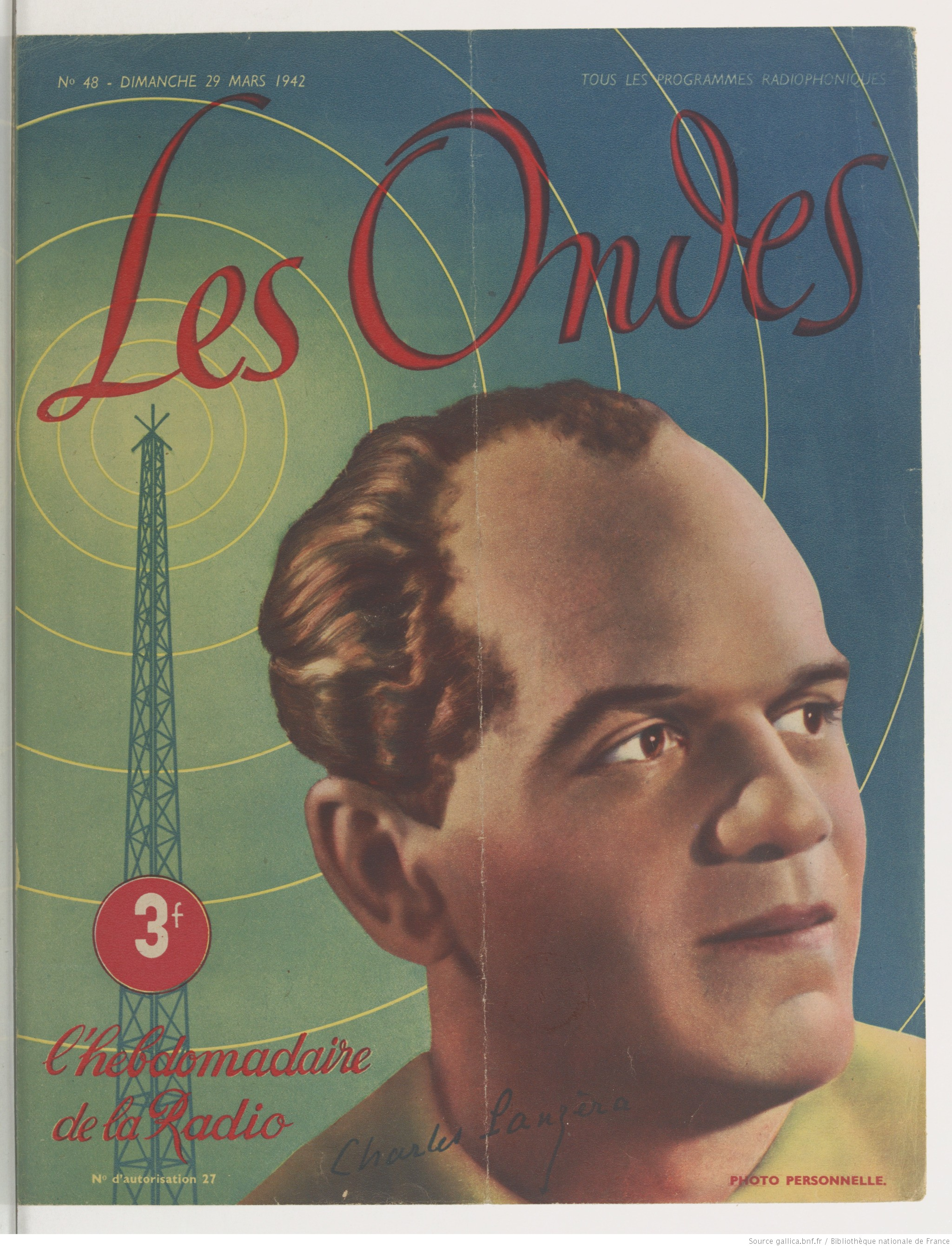
Panzéra on the cover of Les Ondes (a radio magazine), 1942

Charles Auguste Louis Panzéra (16 February 1896 – 6 June 1976) was a Swiss-French operatic and concert baritone. Popular in his time, Panzéra was hailed by critics due to the versatility and subtlety of his vocal tone.

== Biography ==
Born in Geneva in 1896, Panzéra's studies at the Paris Conservatory under the tuition of Amédée-Louis Hettich were interrupted by his drafting into the French Army in World War I. He had previously attained French citizenship at the age of twenty. Twice wounded, he was nevertheless able to complete his course, obtaining a Prix d'excellence following one year.

Following his graduation, Panzéra made his operatic début as Albert in Jules Massenet's Werther at the Opéra-Comique in 1919. He remained there for three seasons, playing both major and minor roles, notably Jahel in Édouard Lalo's Le roi d'Ys, Lescaut in Massenet's Manon and Claude Debussy's Pelléas et Mélisande. He was to sing the latter part numerous times in several countries through 1930, becoming his signature role.

While still a student at the Conservatoire, he met its director, Gabriel Fauré. Fauré oriented him towards the interpretation of vocal chamber works. He also met a piano student, Magdeleine Baillot; she would eventually become his wife and lifelong accompanist.

Fauré dedicated to Panzéra his song-cycle, L'horizon chimérique, composed in the autumn of 1921. This song cycle was premièred under the auspices of the Société Nationale de Musique on 13 May 1922 to much renown, bringing Panzéra's name to further notability.

Panzéra was recognised by critics for an expressive lyricism in his voice, qualities often suited for art-songs. He was acclaimed as an interpreter of mélodies and lieder, touring extensively for nearly forty years. Besides Fauré, he worked personally with and sang the premières of works by Vincent d'Indy, Albert Roussel, Guy Ropartz, Arthur Honegger, Darius Milhaud and many others.

He taught on the faculty of the Juilliard School where one of his pupils was Jane Stuart Smith. In 1949, he was appointed a professor at the Paris Conservatory, remaining till 1966. He also taught voice at the École Normale de Musique de Paris. Among his other pupils were composer Gabriel Cusson, musicologist Alain Daniélou, Pierre Mollet and Caroline Dumas.

Panzéra died in Paris on 6 June 1976 at the age of eighty.

== Discography ==
Immediately following the première of L'horizon chimérique, Panzéra and his wife were contacted by the French department of His Master's Voice to produce recordings. They were so inundated with offers that it was not until December 1923 that they were able to produce any recordings whatsoever, continuing recording much repertoire until the advent of World War II in 1940.

Besides a large selection of mélodies by Fauré, Henri Duparc, Camille Saint-Saëns, André Caplet and many others (including lieder), Panzéra made an album of Robert Schumann's Dichterliebe in 1935, accompanied by Alfred Cortot. He also recorded operatic music both popular and obscure, such as those Jean-Baptiste Lully and other early composers. Panzéra also recorded music by Johann Sebastian Bach, Wolfgang Amadeus Mozart, Ludwig van Beethoven and Richard Wagner.

Panzéra participated in the 1934 complete recording of Hector Berlioz's La damnation de Faust (1934) and, in 1927, some extended scenes from Debussy's Pelléas et Mélisande.

=== Compact discs ===
Many if not all of the above-noticed items have been reissued by EMI in Japan and France, as well as by the French label Dante-Lys. Pearl (Pavilion Records) has issued several volumes, including his performances of Pelléas et Mélisande, which have also appeared through VAI in the USA.

=== Mercury ===
Following World War II, the Panzéras made two LPs for Mercury, which mostly consisted of mélodies. Having not been chosen for remastering during Polygram's mass reissue of the Mercury catalogue in the 1990s, they have since been deemed rarities by collectors.

== Writings ==
He published L'Art de chanter (Paris, 1945); L'Amour de chanter, (Paris, 1957); L'Art vocal: 30 leçons de chant (Paris, 1959) and Votre voix: Directives génerales (Paris, 1967).

== Bibliography ==
- Karl-Josef Kutsch and Leo Riemens, editors: Großes Sängerlexikon Basel, Saur, 2000
- Song on Record : V. 1 (Lieder); V. 2 (Songs, including mélodies). Alan Blyth, editor A history of Art Song and its interpretation, with a guide to available recordings Cambridge, Cambridge University Press, 1986–1988
