= Elly Ameling =

Dutch soprano

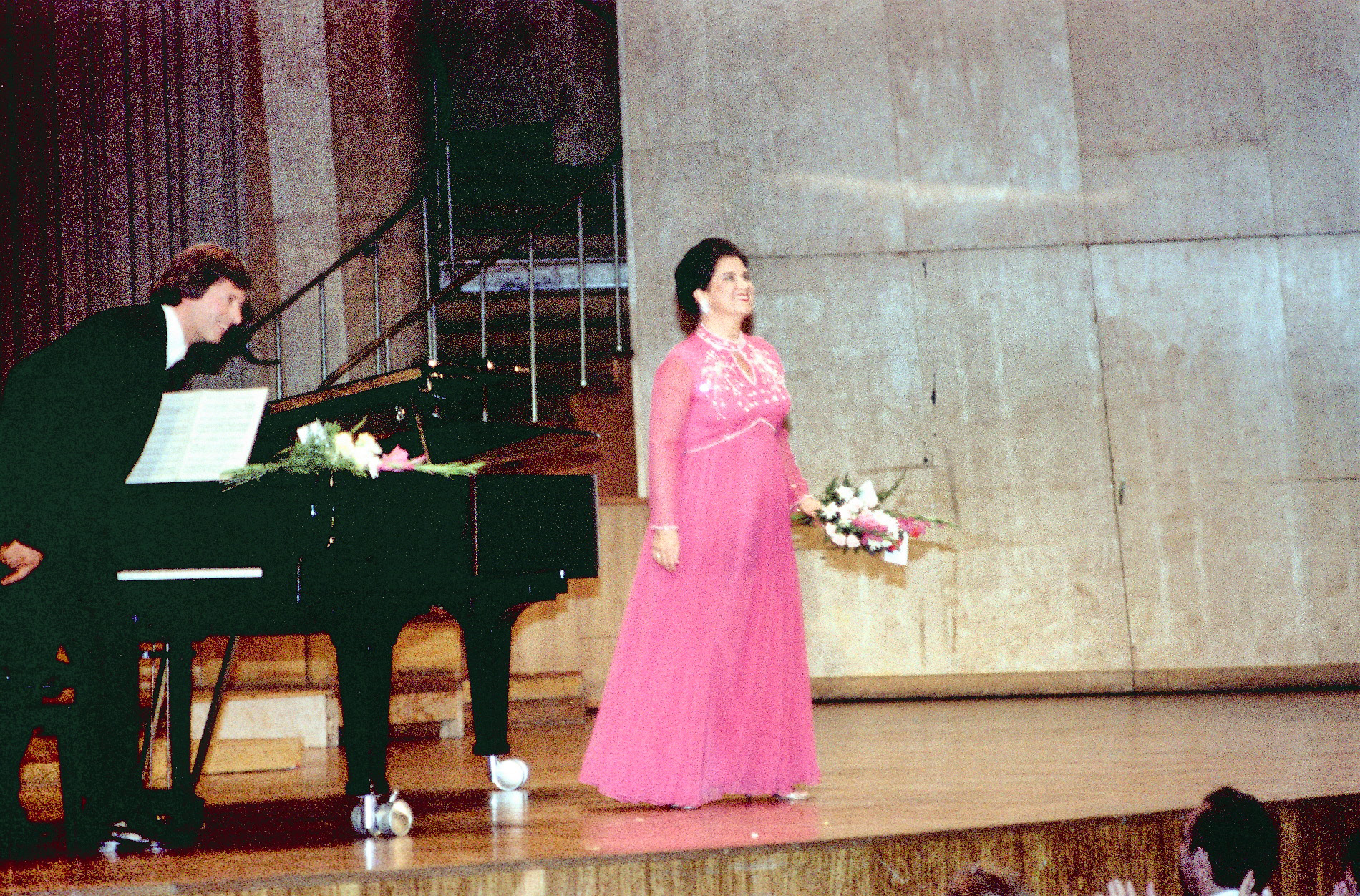
Elly Ameling in 1983

Elisabeth Sara "Elly" Ameling (born 8 February 1933) is a Dutch soprano, who is particularly known for lieder recitals and for performing works by Johann Sebastian Bach. Performing with distinguished pianists and ensembles around the globe, she was awarded various honours and recording prizes.

== Career ==
Ameling was born in Rotterdam on 8 February 1933. She grew up in that city, and studied singing there with Jo Bollekamp and Jacoba Dresden-Dhont. She later studied singing in Paris with Pierre Bernac. She won the first prize at the International Vocal Competition 's-Hertogenbosch in the Netherlands in 1956, and first prize at the Concours International de Musique in Geneva in 1958.

After her professional début as a concert singer in Rotterdam in 1953, she performed for more than forty years in virtually every major cultural centre in the world. She appeared with most of the leading international orchestras and conductors, including Seiji Ozawa, André Previn, Wolfgang Sawallisch, Neville Marriner, Karl Münchinger and Edo de Waart.

She made her career mainly as a concert and lieder singer with some excursions into opera, and became world-renowned for her recitals of French and German songs and for her superlative interpretative gifts. She has been equally at home in chamber music, orchestral music, operas, and oratorios. Her operatic roles included Ilia in Mozart's Idomeneo, Fiordiligi in his Così fan tutte in 1958, Jacqueline in Messager's Fortunio in 1959, and the Marchesa in Verdi's Un giorno di regno in 1974, She made her U.S. recital debut at New York's Lincoln Center in 1968 and her opera debut in 1974 as Ilia in Mozart's Idomeneo in Washington, D.C. In 1974, Ameling also performed for the Peabody Mason Concert series in Boston.

Contemporary works, particularly by her countrymen Bertus van Lier and Robert Heppener, are also part of her large repertoire. Ameling has recorded more than 150 albums and has won many recording prizes, including The Edison Award, the Grand Prix du Disque and the Preis der deutschen Schallplattenkritik. When she retired in 1995, she was regarded as one of the most admired and recorded female lieder singers. She now teaches at the Franz Schubert Institut alongside Julius Drake, Helmut Deutsch, Roger Vignoles, and Cynthia Hoffmann.

== Awards ==
For her services to music, Ameling has been awarded four honorary degrees and has been knighted, in 1971, by Her Majesty the Queen of The Netherlands to the Order of Orange-Nassau. In 2008, she received the highest civil decoration in the Netherlands, the Order of the Netherlands Lion. In 2015, she was awarded the Hugo Wolf Medal of the International Hugo Wolf Academy in Stuttgart.

== Recordings ==
Ameling's recordings focus on lieder, with pianists and orchestras. She recorded two songs from Mahler's Des Knaben Wunderhorn with the English Chamber Orchestra conducted by Benjamin Britten at the 1969 Aldeburgh Festival. In 1970, she recorded Beethoven's Mass in C major with the New Philharmonia Chorus and Orchestra, conducted by Carlo Maria Giulini, alongside Janet Baker, Theo Altmeyer and Marius Rintzler. She recorded in 1968 Mahler Second and Fourth Symphony with the Netherlands Radio Chorus and the Royal Concertgebouw Orchestra conducted by Bernard Haitink, the Second alongside Aafje Heynis. In 1985, she recorded the Schubert's complete incidental music to Rosamunde with the Rundfunkchor Leipzig and the Gewandhausorchester, conducted by Kurt Masur. In 1974 she made, with pianist Dalton Baldwin, the first complete recording of Mozart's lieder for Philips Records. This is still considered to be the reference recording of these works, despite the existence of other cycles.

- Icon: Elly Ameling, The Dutch Nightingale (8CD), 2012, EMI Classics
- Elly Ameling 75 jaar, Live Concertopnamen 1957–1991, Nederlandse Omroep (5CD), 2008, Radio Broadcasts 1957–91, incl. Richard Strauss Vier letzte Lieder, Van Omnium audiovisueel, GW 80003.
- The Artistry of Elly Ameling (5CD), Philips.
- Elly Ameling, After Hours..., Songs by Gershwin, Porter, Prévert a.o.; Louis van Dijk, Philips.
- Elly Ameling, Sentimental Me, Songs by Porter, Ellington, Sondheim a.o.; Louis van Dijk, Polygram Classics.
- Elly Ameling, Sweet Was The Song, international Christmas songs, EMI.
- Elly Ameling, The Early Recordings (4CD), DHM (Sony BMG).
- Bach:
  - Arias from Cantatas for soprano, oboe and b.c., Han de Vries (oboe), Albert de Klerk (organ), Richte van der Meer (cello), EMI.
  - Bauern-, Kaffee-, Hochzeitskantate, Non sà che sia dolore, with Gerald English, Siegmund Nimsgern, Collegium Aureum, DHM (Sony BMG).
  - Ein feste Burg, Jauchzet Gott, Wachet auf, English Chamber Orchestra, Raymond Leppard, Deutsche Bachsolisten, Helmut Winschermann, Philips.
  - Johannes-Passion, Stuttgarter Kammerorchester, Karl Münchinger, Decca.
  - Matthäus-Passion, Stuttgarter Kammerorchester, Karl Münchinger, Decca.
  - Magnificat / Osteroratorium, Stuttgarter Kammerorchester, Karl Münchinger, Decca.
- Weihnachtsoratorium, Stuttgarter Kammerorchester, Karl Münchinger, Decca.
- Berlioz: Les nuits d'été, Atlanta Symphony Orchestra, Robert Shaw, Telarc.
- Brahms: Lieder, Rudolf Jansen, Hyperion.
- Debussy: Mélodies, Dalton Baldwin, EMI. For details, see here
- Fauré:
  - Lieder, Complete Songs (4CD), with Gérard Souzay, Dalton Baldwin, Brilliant.
  - Requiem, Rotterdam Philharmonic Orchestra, Jean Fournet, Philips.
- Grieg: Peer Gynt, San Francisco Symphony Orchestra, Edo de Waart, Philips.
- Handel:
  - Messiah, Academy of St Martin-in-the-Fields, Neville Marriner, Decca.
  - Elly Ameling sings Handel
- Haydn:
  - Orlando Paladino, Orchestre de Chambre de Lausanne, Antal Dorati, Philips.
  - Lieder, Jörg Demus, Brilliant Classics (3-Disc re-issue)
- Mahler:
  - Symphony No. 2 & Symphony No. 4, Royal Concertgebouw Orchestra, Bernard Haitink, Philips.
- Martin:
  - Le mystère de la nativité, Orchestre de la Suisse Romande, Ernest Ansermet, Cascavelle.
  - Frank Martin interprète Frank Martin, with others, Frank Martin, Jecklin Disco.
- Mendelssohn:
  - Elias, Gewandhausorchester, Wolfgang Sawallisch, Philips.
  - Lieder, Rudolf Jansen, Sony BMG.
- Mozart
  - Requiem, Wiener Philharmoniker, Istvan Kertesz, Decca.
  - Mozart, Schubert, Opern-und Konzertarien, Rotterdam Philharmonic Orchestra, Edo de Waart, PENTATONE.
  - The complete Mozart-Edition Vol. 24 (Lieder, Notturni), Philips.
- Poulenc: Edition du centenaire 1899–1963 (Melodies & Lieder), EMI Classics.
- Ravel: Mélodies-Lieder, Shéhérazade, Rudolf Jansen, Erato (Warner).
- Schubert, Lieder (4CD), Dalton Baldwin, Rudolf Jansen, Philips.
- Schubert, Schumann, Lieder, Jörg Demus, DHM (Sony BMG).
- Schubert, Duette-Terzette-Quartette, with Janet Baker, Dietrich Fischer-Dieskau, Peter Schreier, Gerald Moore, Deutsche Grammophon.
- Schumann: Frauenliebe und Leben, Dalton Baldwin, PENTATONE.
- Vivaldi:
  - Berühmte geistliche Chorwerke, Nulla in mundo pax, English Chamber Orchestra, Vittorio Negri, Philips.
  - Juditha triumphans, with the Kammerorchester Berlin, Vittorio Negri, Philips.
- Wolf:
  - Italienisches Liederbuch, Goethe- und Keller-Lieder, with Tom Krause, Irwin Gage, Rudolf Jansen, GLOBE.
  - Spanisches Liederbuch, Rudolf Jansen, Hyperion.

== Sources ==
- Hamilton, David. (1987). The Metropolitan Opera Encyclopedia: A Comprehensive Guide to the World of Opera. New York, London, Toronto, Sydney, Tokyo: Simon and Schuster. p. 21. ISBN 0-671-61732-X.
- Sadie, Stanley and John Tyrrell. (2001). The New Grove Dictionary of Music and Musicians. London: Macmillan Publishers Ltd. Vol. 1, p. 462. ISBN 0-333-60800-3.
- Janny de Jong: Elly Ameling, vocaal avontuur. 104 pages, Unieboek/De Gooise Uitgeverij, Bussum (NL) 1978, ISBN 90-269-8404-9.
