= Dalton Baldwin =

American pianist (1931–2019)

Dalton Baldwin (December 19, 1931 – December 12, 2019) was an American collaborative pianist. He made more than 100 recordings and won numerous prizes, working with outstanding singers such as Gérard Souzay, Elly Ameling, Arleen Auger, Steven Kimbrough, Jacqueline Roberts and Jessye Norman. He visited southern Africa on numerous occasions, accompanying Gérard Souzay three times (in 1958 for the first time) and Elly Ameling twice (in 1973 for the first time).

Baldwin was Souzay's longterm partner. He died on December 12, 2019, aged 87.

== See also ==
- Debussy Mélodies (1980 recording)
