= Ariettes oubliées =

1887 song cycle by Claude Debussy

- Song cycle by Claude Debussy
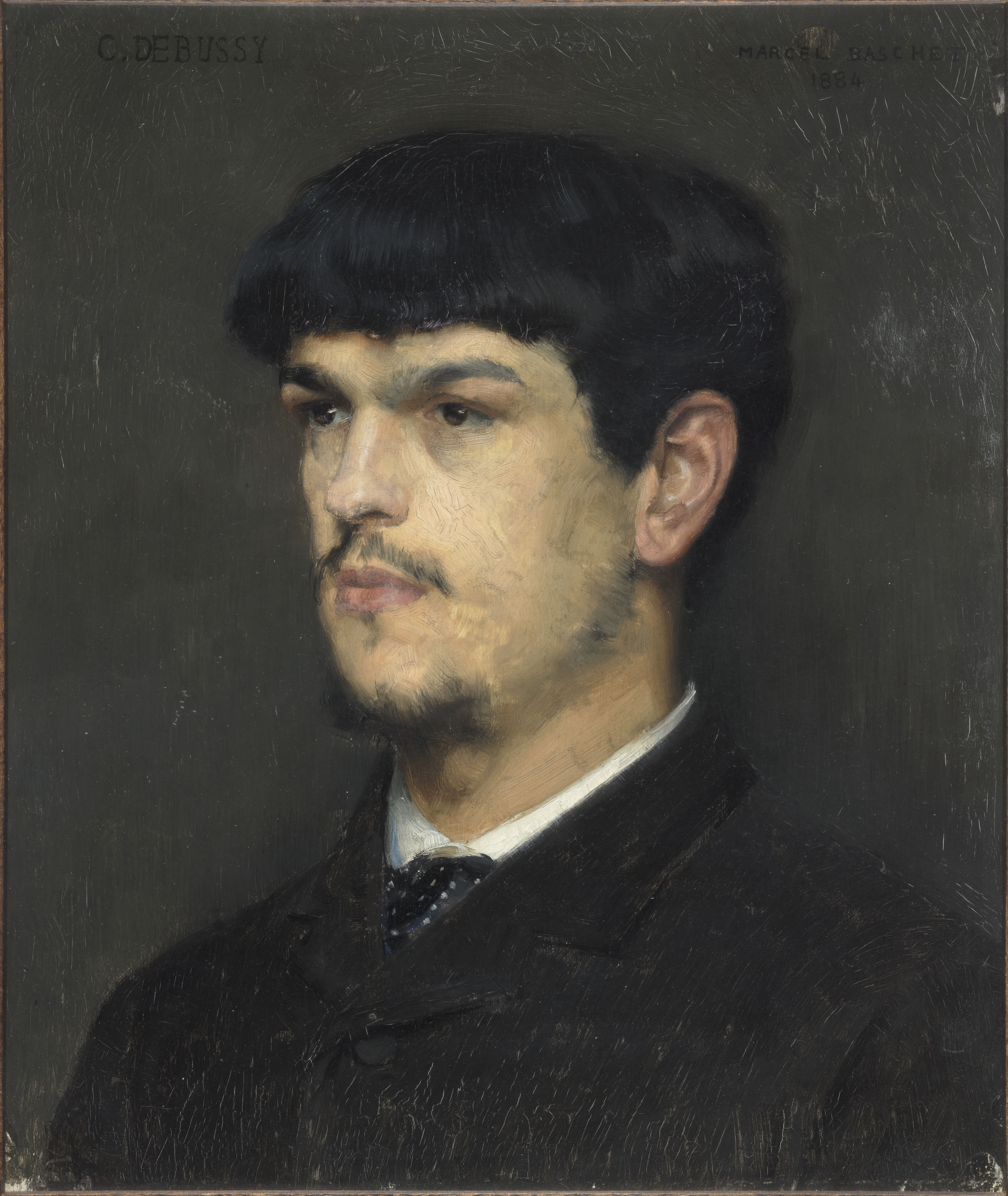
- The composer in 1884, portrayed by Marcel Baschet
- English: Forgotten Songs
- Catalogue: L. 60
- Text: poems by Paul Verlaine
- Language: French
- Composed: 1885–87
- Dedication: Mary Garden
- Performed: March 1887
- Movements: six
- Scoring: voice; piano

Ariettes oubliées (Forgotten Songs) is a song cycle for voice and piano, L. 60 by Claude Debussy, based on poems by Paul Verlaine. The work consists of six pieces, with an approximate run time of sixteen minutes.

== History ==
The six ariettes were composed mainly in Rome and Paris during the year, 1886. The first two were completed in March 1887, with the others following close behind. They were re-published once again in 1903 under the official title of: Ariettes oubliées. Once published officially, Verlaine's poetry was brought back into the spotlight. This was largely due to Debussy's meticulous approach to composing for previously published text. Never before had words and music been so carefully and consciously paired.

However, after this period of time, Debussy's compositions for piano and voice declined. The exact reason for this is unknown. Although, many speculate that Debussy might have been left uninspired by the lack of a talented singer in his proximity. Additionally, Symbolist circles that Debussy was a part of were strongly critical of language during the time, which more than likely contributed to the lack of compositions. Debussy did not compose for piano and voice again until 1910 when he set François Villon's poetic, final last statement to music.

The song cycle was dedicated to the singer Mary Garden, who was known for performing as Mélisande, a role from one of Debussy's operatic works. The poetry of Paul Verlaine had a more profound influence on Claude Debussy's music than did Debussy's closest literary or musical acquaintances.

Debussy and Verlaine were both inspired by subtlety and nuance. Each man sought to innovate by using rhythm and tone color as the basis for a new form of a pre-existing art. In the Ariettes oubliées, subtlety, nuance, rhythm and tone color (timbre) converged to create a mature compositional style for Debussy, which, in turn, gave a heightened level of understanding to Verlaine's poetry. This collection of songs set the tone for all of Debussy's future vocal compositions in terms of rhythm, harmony, tone, color and attention to poetic detail.

== Songs ==
No. 2: "Il pleure dans mon cœur"

No 4: "Chevaux de bois"

No. 6: "Aquarelles II. Spleen"
all by: Xiaobo Su, soprano; Giorgi Latso, piano

=== 1. C'est l'extase langoureuse ===
"C'est l'extase langoureuse" was composed in 1887 and was included in the 1903 publication of Ariettes oubliées as the first piece of the cycle. The piece was one of Debussy's earliest compositions. Additionally, the piece is known as one of Debussy's most sophisticated experiments in tonal composition.

The text comes from Verlaine's Romances sans paroles, which was published in 1874. The poetry used for this particular piece was written in a, a, b, c, c, b form and describes the fatigue of love and longing throughout the text.

A quote by Favart is included with the score, which states: "Le vent dans la plaine suspend son haleine." ("The wind over the plain is holding its breath.") This quote directly relates to the sense of longing established by the poetry, as well as Debussy's compositional style of dramatic crescendos/diminuendos, as well as sustained, ultimately descending chords throughout the accompaniment.

C'est l'extase langoureuse,
C'est la fatigue amoureuse,
C'est tous les frissons des bois
Parmi l'étreinte des brises,
C'est, vers les ramures grises,
Le chœur des petites voix.
Ô le frêle et frais murmure !
Cela gazouille et susurre,
Cela ressemble au cri doux
Que l'herbe agitée expire …
Tu dirais, sous l'eau qui vire,
Le roulis sourd des cailloux.
Cette âme qui se lamente
En cette plainte dormante
C'est la nôtre, n'est-ce pas ?
La mienne, dis, et la tienne,
Dont s'exhale l'humble antienne
Par ce tiède soir, tout bas ?

Translation:

It is languorous rapture,
It is amorous fatigue,
It is all the tremors of the forest
In the breezes' embrace,
It is, around the grey branches,
The choir of tiny voices.
O the delicate, fresh murmuring!
The warbling and whispering,
It is like the soft cry
The ruffled grass gives out…
You might take it for the muffled sound
Of pebbles in the swirling stream.
This soul which grieves
In this subdued lament,
It is ours, is it not?
Mine, and yours too,
Breathing out our humble hymn
On this warm evening, soft and low?

=== 2. Il pleure dans mon cœur ===
The second piece of the cycle, "Il pleure dans mon cœur" compares falling rain to falling tears. Written in G♯ minor, Debussy's music includes almost continuous eighth notes that alternate between the right and left hands, creating an atmosphere that evokes the sound of raindrops. In addition to the eighth notes, a slow moving legato melody is played throughout the entire piece, complimenting the sadness the poetry describes.

The quote that accompanies this particular piece is one by R. Rimbaud, which reads: "Il pleut doucement sur la ville". ("It rains lightly over the city.")

Il pleure dans mon cœur
Comme il pleut sur la ville;
Quelle est cette langueur
Qui pénètre mon cœur?
Ô bruit doux de la pluie
Par terre et sur les toits !
Pour un cœur qui s'ennuie
Ô le bruit de la pluie !
Il pleure sans raison
Dans ce cœur qui s'écœure.
Quoi! nulle trahison ? …
Ce deuil est sans raison.
C'est bien la pire peine
De ne savoir pourquoi
Sans amour et sans haine,
Mon cœur a tant de peine.

Translation:

Tears fall in my heart
As rain falls on the town;
What is this torpor
Pervading my heart?
Ah, the soft sound of rain
On the ground and roofs!
For a listless heart,
Ah, the sound of the rain!
Tears fall without reason
In this disheartened heart.
What! Was there no treason?…
This grief's without reason.
And the worst pain of all
Must be not to know why
Without love and without hate
My heart feels such pain.

=== 3. L'ombre des arbres ===
As the third song in the cycle, "L'ombre des arbres" provides a dramatic shift in tempo when compared to the first two pieces. The initial Lent et triste instruction is interpreted as 'slow and sad'. This instruction compliments the weary and hopeless imagery created by the text and supported by the accompaniment.

The opening quote for this piece is one that comes from Cyrano de Bergerac. It reads: "Le rossignol qui du haut d'une branche se regarde dedans, croit étre tombé dans la riviére. Il est au sommet d'un chêne et toutefois il a peur de se noyer." ("The nightingale, from a high branch, sees himself reflected below, and believes he has fallen into the river. He is at the top of an oak tree, and, nevertheless, fears he will be drowned.")

L'ombre des arbres dans la rivière embrumée
Meurt comme de la fumée
Tandis qu'en l'air, parmi les ramures réelles,
Se plaignent les tourterelles.
Combien, ô voyageur, ce paysage blême
Te mira blême toi-même,
Et que tristes pleuraient dans les hautes feuillées
Tes espérances noyées !

Translation:

The shadow of trees in the misty stream
Dies like smoke,
While up above, in the real branches,
The turtle-doves lament.
How this faded landscape, O traveller,
Watched you yourself fade,
And how sadly in the lofty leaves
Your drowned hopes were weeping!

=== 4. Chevaux de Bois ===
As the fourth piece of the cycle, "Chevaux de bois" dramatically changes the overall atmosphere of the cycle with a fast, lively piano accompaniment and vocal line. The piano starts with fortissimo trills, accompanied by accented, detached eighth notes and triplets. After a robust introduction, the singer jumps right in, exclaiming "Tournez, tournez." The piece continues on with an exciting, forward-moving accompaniment, ultimately slowing into a pianissimo finale in E major.

An opening quote at the top of the score from Victor Hugo reads: "Par saint-Gille, viens-nous-en, mon agile Alezan ;"

Tournez, tournez, bons chevaux de bois,
Tournez cent tours, tournez mille tours,
Tournez souvent et tournez toujours,
Tournez, tournez au son des hautbois.
L'enfant tout rouge et la mère blanche,
Le gars en noir et la fille en rose,
L'une à la chose et l'autre à la pose,
Chacun se paie un sou de dimanche.
Tournez, tournez, chevaux de leur cœur,
Tandis qu'autour de tous vos tournois
Clignote l'œil du filou sournois,
Tournez au son du piston vainqueur !
C'est étonnant comme ça vous soûle
D'aller ainsi dans ce cirque bête :
Rien dans le ventre et mal dans la tête,
Du mal en masse et du bien en foule.
Tournez, dadas, sans qu'il soit besoin
D'user jamais de nuls éperons
Pour commander à vos galops ronds:
Tournez, tournez, sans espoir de foin.
Et dépêchez, chevaux de leur âme,
Déjà voici que sonne à la soupe
La nuit qui tombe et chasse la troupe
De gais buveurs que leur soif affame.
Tournez, tournez ! Le ciel en velours
D'astres en or se vêt lentement.
L'église tinte un glas tristement.
Tournez au son joyeux des tambours !

Translation:

Turn, turn, you fine wooden horses,
Turn a hundred, turn a thousand times,
Turn often and turn for evermore
Turn and turn to the oboe's sound.
The red-faced child and the pale mother,
The lad in black and the girl in pink,
One down-to-earth, the other showing off,
Each buying a treat with his Sunday sou.
Turn, turn, horses of their hearts,
While the furtive pickpocket's eye is flashing
As you whirl about and whirl around,
Turn to the sound of the conquering cornet!
Astonishing how drunk it makes you,
Riding like this in this foolish fair:
With an empty stomach and an aching head,
Discomfort in plenty and masses of fun!
Gee-gees, turn, you'll never need
The help of any spur
To make your horses gallop round:
Turn, turn, without hope of hay.
And hurry on, horses of their souls:
Nightfall already calls them to supper
And disperses the crowd of happy revellers,
Ravenous with thirst.
Turn, turn! The velvet sky
Is slowly decked with golden stars.
The church bell tolls a mournful knell—
Turn to the joyful sound of drums!

=== 5. Green (Aquarelle) ===
"Green" explores the emotions of young love. Published in 1888, Debussy composed this piece through the utilization of compound and simple meter. Generally, the compound meter accompanies the lines of the poetry describing actions, while the simple meter accompanies the requests made by the lover.

Voici des fruits, des fleurs, des feuilles et des branches
Et puis voici mon cœur qui ne bat que pour vous.
Ne le déchirez pas avec vos deux mains blanches
Et qu'à vos yeux si beaux l'humble présent soit doux.
J'arrive tout couvert encore de rosée
Que le vent du matin vient glacer à mon front.
Souffrez que ma fatigue à vos pieds reposée
Rêve des chers instants qui la délasseront.
Sur votre jeune sein laissez rouler ma tête
Toute sonore encore de vos derniers baisers;
Laissez-la s'apaiser de la bonne tempête,
Et que je dorme un peu puisque vous reposez.

Translation:

Here are flowers, branches, fruit, and fronds,
And here too is my heart that beats just for you.
Do not tear it with your two white hands
And may the humble gift please your lovely eyes.
I come all covered still with the dew
Frozen to my brow by the morning breeze.
Let my fatigue, finding rest at your feet,
Dream of dear moments that will soothe it.
On your young breast let me cradle my head
Still ringing with your recent kisses;
After love's sweet tumult grant it peace,
And let me sleep a while, since you rest.

=== 6. Spleen (Aquarelle) ===
While a specific date is unknown, "Spleen" was composed between 1885 and 1887. As the final piece of the cycle, "Spleen" describes a pleading lover and the ultimate fragility of the relationship at stake. The accompaniment starts out slow (Lent) and pianissimo, ultimately building to a grand fortissimo. The piece ends with a molto rallentando, back to pianissimo and into the lyric "hélas !" ultimately signifying the rest Verlaine's poetry describes.

Les roses étaient toutes rouges
Et les lierres étaient tout noirs.
Chère, pour peu que tu te bouges,
Renaissent tous mes désespoirs.
Le ciel était trop bleu, trop tendre,
La mer trop verte et l'air trop doux.
Je crains toujours,—ce qu'est d'attendre !—
Quelque fuite atroce de vous.
Du houx à la feuille vernie
Et du luisant buis je suis las,
Et de la campagne infinie
Et de tout, fors de vous, hélas !

Translation:

All the roses were red
And the ivy was all black.
Dear, at your slightest move,
All my despair revives.
The sky was too blue, too tender,
The sea too green, the air too mild.
I always fear—oh to wait and wonder!—
One of your agonizing departures.
I am weary of the glossy holly,
Of the gleaming box-tree too,
And the boundless countryside
And everything, alas, but you!
