= Mélodie =

French art song genre

A mélodie (French: [melɔdi]) is a form of French art song, arising in the mid-19th century. It is comparable to the German Lied. A chanson, by contrast, is a folk or popular French song.

The literal meaning of the word in the French language is "melody".

== Nature ==
The mélodie is often defined by comparison with the lied. Pierre Bernac provides this comparison in The Interpretation of French Song:

Debussy goes on to write that 'clarity of expression, precision and concentration of form are qualities peculiar to the French genius.' These qualities are indeed most noticeable when again compared with the German genius, excelling as it does in long, uninhibited outpourings, directly opposed to the French taste, which abhors overstatement and venerates concision and diversity.

Bernac writes that "the art of the greatest French composers is an art of suggestion", rather than explicit statement of feelings.

The mélodie is noted for its deliberate and close relationship between text and melody. To compose or interpret mélodies, one must have a sensitive knowledge of the French language, French poetry, and French poetic diction. Numerous books have been written about the details of French pronunciation specifically for mélodie singers, often featuring IPA transcriptions of songs with further notations for French-specific features like liaison and elision.

== History ==
The mélodie arose just before the middle of the 19th century in France. Though the lied had reached its peak in the early 19th century, the mélodie developed independently of that tradition. Instead, it grew more directly from the earlier genre of French songs known as the romance. These songs, while apparently quite similar to the mélodie, were then as now viewed as being of a lighter and less specific nature. The text of a mélodie was more likely to be taken from contemporary, serious poetry and the music was also generally of a more profound sort. Further, while most composers in this genre were Romantics, at least in chronology, certain features of mélodies have led many to view them as not properly Romantic.

Some of the first mélodies were those of Hector Berlioz. He was among the first to use the term to describe his own compositions, and his song cycle Les nuits d'été (1841) is still considered an example of the genre. Whatever Berlioz' chronological precedence, Charles Gounod is often viewed as the first distinct composer of mélodies: his compositional style evolves imperceptibly and illustratively from romance to mélodie. He wrote over 200 mélodies, on texts by such poets as Victor Hugo and Lamartine. His setting of Lord Byron's Maid of Athens, in English, is a perfect example of a romance that has become a mélodie.

Though numerous other composers, such as Massenet, wrote mélodies during Gounod's lifetime, a name that cannot be omitted is that of Gabriel Fauré, who wrote over 100 mélodies. Fauré is best remembered for his settings of the poetry of Paul Verlaine, including Clair de lune and the song cycles Cinq mélodies "de Venise" and La bonne chanson.

A contemporary of Fauré whose name has become practically synonymous with the mélodie, even though he left only a handful of them, is Henri Duparc.

Claude Debussy and Maurice Ravel are today best known for their instrumental compositions. However, they both wrote dozens of mélodies that are still closely studied and often performed. Debussy is noted for a particular gift for marrying text and music, while Ravel based a number of his on folk song, in direct contradiction to the common practice for mélodies, transfiguring both forms.

Contemporaries of Ravel who were noted mélodie composers include Albert Roussel, Reynaldo Hahn and André Caplet. Though more famous as a composer for the organ, Louis Vierne wrote several collections of mélodies with texts from Baudelaire, Verlaine, and others.

Mélodies continue to be composed, though perhaps the last uncontestedly great composer of them was Francis Poulenc, who died in 1963. He wrote nearly 150 mélodies of all sorts.

== Bibliography ==
- Bernac, Pierre: The Interpretation of French Song. New York, Praeger, 1970. Reprint by Norton, New York, 1978.
- Panzéra, Charles: L'amour de chanter. Bruxelles, H. Lemoine, 1957.
- Song on Record : V. 1 (Lieder); V. 2 (Song, including mélodie). Alan Blyth, Editor [A history of Art Song and its interpretation, with a guide to available recordings.] Cambridge, Cambridge University Press, 1986–1988
