= List of compositions by Emmanuel Chabrier =

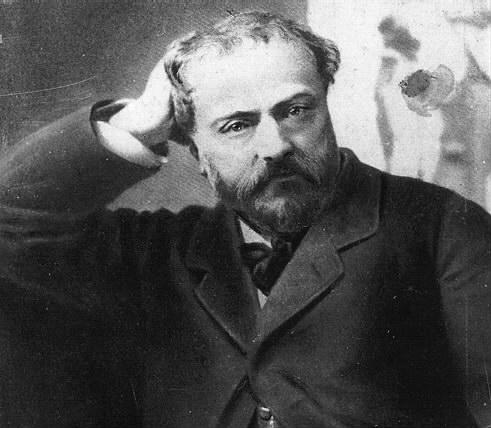
Emmanuel Chabrier in 1882

This is a list of compositions by Emmanuel Chabrier (1841–94)

== Operas and operettas ==
- Jean Hunyade (opéra), 1867, incomplete
- Le service obligatoire (opérette bouffe), 1872, score lost
- Fisch-Ton-Kan (opéra bouffe), 1863–64, incomplete
- L'étoile (opéra bouffe), 1877
- Le Sabbat (opéra comique), 1877, incomplete
- La Girondine (opéra), 1878, lost
- Une éducation manquée (opérette), 1879
- Les muscadins (opéra), 1880, incomplete
- Gwendoline (opéra), 1886
- Le roi malgré lui (opéra comique), 1887
- Briséïs, or Les amants de Corinthe (drame lyrique), 1888-91, incomplete
- Vaucochard et fils Ier (opérette), 1864, incomplete

== Orchestral works ==
- Lamento (1875)
- Larghetto for horn and orchestra (1875)
- España, rhapsody for orchestra (1883; also arranged by the composer for two pianos. Several other piano arrangements by other composers)
- Prélude pastoral and Joyeuse marche (1888; Chabrier's orchestration of Prélude et marche française for piano 4-hands (1883/5)).
- Suite pastorale (1888, orchestrations by the composer of four pieces from the Pièces pittoresques for piano)

== Piano works ==
- Rêverie (1855)
- Julia, Grande Valse, Op. 1 (1857)
- Le scalp!!! (1861)
- Souvenirs de Brunehaut, Waltz (1862)
- Marche des Cipayes (1863)
- Suite des valses (1872)
- Impromptu in C major (1873)
- Pas redoublé (Cortège burlesque) for four hands (1881)
- 10 Pièces pittoresques (1881)
- Trois valses romantiques for 2 Pianos (1883) (also orchestrated by Felix Mottl)
- Prélude et marche française for piano 4-hands (1883/5). Prélude orchestrated by Chabrier as Prélude pastoral, Marche française orchestrated as Joyeuse Marche (both 1888; the latter revised 1890, and also arranged for piano solo)
- Habanera (1885, also orchestrated by the composer, 1888)
- Souvenirs de Munich, Quadrille on Favourite Themes from Tristan und Isolde for piano 4-hands (1885–86)
- Bourrée fantasque (1891; orchestrated by Felix Mottl, 1898, Charles Koechlin, 1924, Robin Holloway (completion of Chabrier's unfinished orchestration), 1994)
- Cinq morceaux (posthumous)
- Air de Ballet (posthumous)

== Songs ==
- Nine Songs (1862) (Couplets de Mariette, L'Enfant, Ronde gauloise, Le Sentier sombre, Lied, Chants d'oiseaux, Sérénade, Adieux à Suzon, Ah! petit démon!)
- Le pas d'armes du roi Jean (Hugo) (1866)
- Ivresses! (Labarre) (1869)
- L'invitation au voyage (1870, poem by Charles Baudelaire)
- Sérénade de Ruy Blas "À quoi bon entendre" (1873)
- Sommation irrespectueuse (1880, poem by Victor Hugo)
- Tes yeux bleus (1883)
- Credo d'amour (1883)
- Chanson pour Jeanne (1886)
- 6 mélodies (1890) (Ballade des gros dindons, Villanelle des petits canards, Les Cigales, Pastorale des cochons roses, L'Île heureuse, Toutes les fleurs)
- Lied. Nez au Vent (posth.)

See Songs of Emmanuel Chabrier.

== Other vocal works ==
- Cocodette et Cocorico. Comic duet for soprano, tenor and orchestra (1878)
- Monsieur et Madame Orchestre. Comic duet for 2 voices, choir and piano (1877–79)
- La Sulamite. Scène lyrique for mezzo-soprano, female chorus and orchestra (1884)
- Duo de l'ouvreuse de l'Opéra-Comique et de l'employé du Bon Marché (1888)
- À la musique for soprano, female chorus and orchestra (piano) (1890, words by Rostand)

== Pieces by others, after Chabrier ==
Verlaine's sonnet À Emmanuel Chabrier (published in Amour, 1888) written just after the initial run of Le roi malgré lui is a tribute to their friendship.
Émile Waldteufel: España - Waltz after Chabrier, Op. 236 (quotes mainly from España but also a duo from Une éducation manquée).
Erik Satie: San Bernardo and Españaña (1913) quote España (dedicated to Claude Debussy's daughter, Chouchou [Emma-Claude]).
Maurice Ravel: A la manière de... Chabrier (1913); Siébel's air from Act 3 of Charles Gounod's Faust in the style of Chabrier.

The ballet Cotillon (Monte Carlo, 1932) with choreography by George Balanchine uses music by Chabrier: ‘La toilette’ is the Menuet pompeux orchestrated by Vittorio Rieti, and ‘Danse des chapeaux’, ‘Les mains du destin’ and ‘Grand rond’ are, respectively, the Scherzo-valse, Idylle and Danse villageoise in Chabrier’s own orchestrations. Suite fantasque 'Divertissement in five tableaux' (Paris, 16 January 1948) with choreography by Jean-Jacques Etchevery, was produced at the Opéra-Comique (incorporating La bourée Fantasque, premiered in 1946). Bar aux Folies-Bergère is a one-act ballet (London, 1934) with scenario and choreography by Ninette de Valois, designs by William Chappell after Manet and music consisting of piano works by Chabrier, selected and arranged by Constant Lambert.
