= List of operas and operettas by Emmanuel Chabrier =

This is a list of operas and operettas by Emmanuel Chabrier (1841–94).

== List ==
Title	Genre	Subdivisions	Libretto	Première date	Place, theatre	Notes
Jean Hunyade	opera	4 acts	Henri Fouquier			composed 1867, incomplete, only 62 pages of manuscript survive, fragments used in Gwendoline and Briséïs
Le service obligatoire (with Jules Costé and René de Boisdeffre)	opérette bouffe	3 acts	Marion, Henri Meilhac, Fournier-Sarloveze	21 December 1872	Paris, Cercle de l'Union artistique	score lost
Fisch-Ton-Kan	opéra bouffe	1 act	Paul Verlaine and probably Lucien Viotti, after Thomas Sauvage and Gabriel de Lurieu's Fich-Tong-Khan ou L'orphelin de la Tartarie	31 March 1875	Paris, Cercle de l'Union Artistique	composed 1863–1864, incomplete
L'étoile	opéra bouffe	3 acts	Eugène Leterrier and Albert Vanloo	28 November 1877	Paris, Théâtre des Bouffes Parisiens	
Le Sabbat	opéra comique	1 act	Paul Armand Silvestre			composed 1877, incomplete, only some pages survive
La Girondine	opéra		Jules Claretie			composed 1878, lost or transferred to Les muscadins
Une éducation manquée	opérette	1 act	Eugène Leterrier and Albert Vanloo	1 May 1879	Paris, Cercle de la Presse	
Les muscadins	opéra	4 acts	Jules Claretie and Paul Armand Silvestre			composed 1880, incomplete, only certain numbers survive in manuscript
Gwendoline	opéra	3 acts	Catulle Mendès	10 April 1886	Brussels, La Monnaie	
Le roi malgré lui	opéra comique	3 acts	Émile de Najac and Paul Burani, revised by Jean Richepin, after Marguerite-Louise Virginie Ancelot's Le roi malgré lui	18 May 1887	Paris, Opéra-Comique (Favart)	
Briséïs, or Les amants de Corinthe	drame lyrique	3 acts	Catulle Mendès and Ephraïm Mikaël, after Goethe's Die Braut von Korinth	13 January 1897	Paris, Concerts Lamoureux	composed 1888–91, Act 1 complete, some sketches for Act 2 and themes in manuscript
Vaucochard et fils Ier	opérette		Paul Verlaine and Lucien Viotti	22 April 1941	Paris, Salle de l'Ancien Conservatoire	composed 1864, incomplete, only four surviving numbers
