= Armin Jordan =

Swiss conductor (1932–2006)

- Born: 9 April 1932; Luzern, Switzerland
- Died: 20 September 2006 (aged 74) Zürich, Switzerland
- Genres: Classical
- Occupations: Conductor, pedagogue
- Formerly of: Orchestre de la Suisse Romande

Armin Jordan (9 April 1932 – 20 September 2006) was a Swiss conductor known for his interpretations of French music, Mozart and Wagner.

Armin Jordan was born in Lucerne, Switzerland. "Mr. Jordan was a large man, with a slab of a face and a full mouth, often twisted in a sardonic smile, and his powerful physical presence belied the careful near-understatement of his conducting", noted The New York Times in his obituary.

Jordan was most unusual at a time when conductors flew about the world from one engagement to another. For the most part he stayed close to home in Switzerland and France. After leading a number of Swiss orchestras he became principal conductor of the Orchestre de la Suisse Romande, Geneva, in 1985, a position he held until 1997.

Armin Jordan did not conduct in the United States until 1998. He appeared in Seattle (Aug 1998/Tristan und Isolde) and New York City. Seattle scheduled him for Wagner's Ring in 2000 and 2001, but he had to withdraw after a few performances in 2000 because of illness. For the same reason, he canceled his debut at the Metropolitan Opera in New York in 2001. He was to have conducted Mozart's Così fan tutte. His son, the conductor Philippe Jordan, made his own debut at the Met in 2002.

Armin Jordan died in Zürich five days after he collapsed while conducting Prokofiev's The Love for Three Oranges at the Theater Basel. In addition to Philippe, his survivors are his widow Kate and his daughter Pascale.

== Selected discography ==
- Richard Wagner: Orchestral Music - Die Meistersinger von Nürnberg Prelude, Parsifal Good Friday Music, Götterdämmerung Siegfried's Rhine Journey, Rienzi Overture. Basler Sinfonieorchester. Erato ECD 88015.
- Ernest Chausson: Symphony, Op. 20; Viviane, Op. 5, Basel Symphony Orchestra. Erato/Warner B000F4ASUS.
- César Franck: Le Chasseur maudit, Les Éolides, Psyché, Basel Symphony Orchestra. Erato ECD 88167.
- Édouard Lalo: Le Roi d'Ys, with Eduardo Villa, Philippe Bohee, Delores Ziegler, Jean-Philippe Courtis, Michel Piquemal, Barbara Hendricks, and Marcel Vanaud; Orchestre Philharmonique de Radio France. Erato/Warner B00000E8RK.
- Gustav Mahler: Symphony No. 4, with Edith Wiens, Orchestre de la Suisse Romande. Erato/Warner B00000E8U7.
- Francis Poulenc's La Voix humaine; La Dame de Monte-Carlo. Orchestre de la Suisse Romande with soprano Felicity Lott. Harmonia Mundi HMC 901759
- Sergei Prokofiev: Romeo and Juliet (three suites), Orchestre de la Suisse Romande. Erato/Warner B000005E8O.
- Maurice Ravel: Piano Concertos, with Anne Queffélec; Orchestre de l'opéra de Monte Carlo. Erato/Warner Classics B000054285.
- Maurice Ravel's L'enfant et les sortilèges, Orchestre de la Suisse Romande. Erato/Warner Classics B00004VLSY.
- Emmanuel Chabrier works for orchestra - España, Suite Pastorale, Gwendoline overture, Bourrée Fantasque, Danse Slave, Joyeuse marche; Orchestre National de France (Erato)
- Robert Schumann: The Four Symphonies. Orchestre de la Suisse Romande. Erato/Warner B000009ILZ.
- Robert Schumann's Das Paradies und die Peri, with Christoph Prégardien, Robert Gambill, Edith Wiens, Anne Gjevang, Sylvia Herman, & Hans-Peter Scheidegger; Romand Chamber Choir, Pro Arte Chorus of Lausanne; Orchestre de la Suisse Romande. Erato 2292-45456-2.
- Johann Strauss, Jr.'s Der Zigeunerbaron. Performed by Rudolf Wasserlof, Zoran Todorovic, Martin Homrich, Jeannette Fischer, Béla Perencz, Hanna Schaer, Ewa Wolak, Paul Kong, Luc Héry, Natalia Ushakova and the French National Radio Orchestra and Chorus. Naive 5002.
- Richard Wagner: Parsifal, Reiner Goldberg, Yvonne Minton, Robert Lloyd, Wolfgang Schöne, Aage Haugland Orchestre Philharmonique de Monte-Carlo, Prague Philharmonic Chorus. Erato 2292-45662-2 (used for the film by Hans-Jürgen Syberberg)
- Paul Dukas' Ariane et Barbe-Bleue, Katherine Ciesinski, Mariana Paunova, Gabriel Bacquier, Nouvel Orchestre Philharmonique de Radio France, Erato - LP 1983, CD 1991
- Haydn: Insert arias and Cantata « Miseri Noi, Misera Patria » - with Edith Mathis, the Orchestre de Chambre de Lausanne (Philips)
