= Paul Vidal =

French composer, conductor and music teacher (1863–1931)

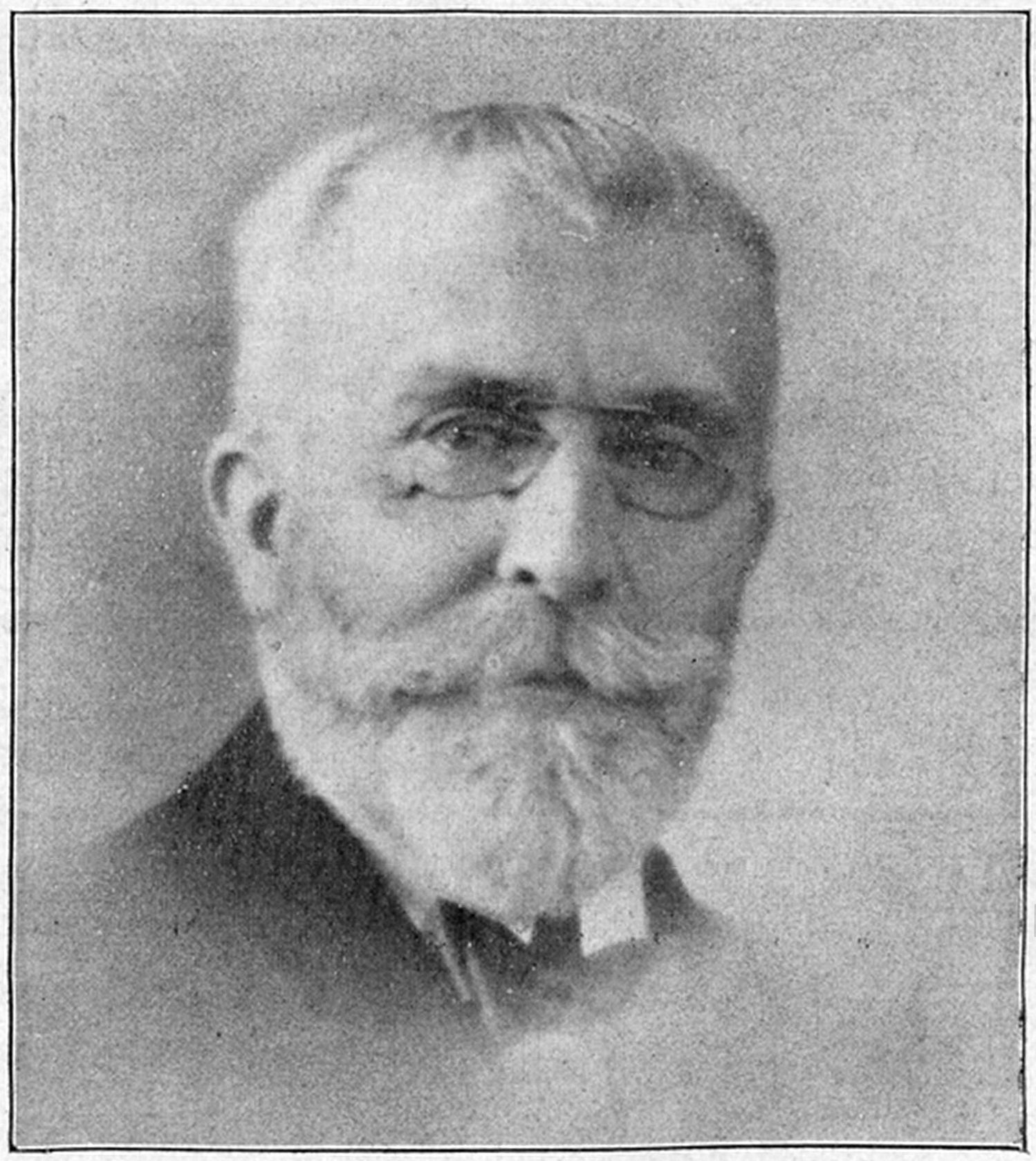
Portrait of Paul Vidal, 1924

Paul Antonin Vidal (16 June 1863 – 9 April 1931) was a French composer, conductor and music teacher mainly active in Paris.

== Life and career ==
Paul Vidal was born in Toulouse, and studied at the conservatoires there and in Paris, under Jules Massenet at the latter. He won the Prix de Rome in 1883, one year before Claude Debussy. On 8 January 1886, in Rome, Vidal and Debussy performed Franz Liszt's Faust Symphony at two pianos for Liszt himself, an after-dinner performance that Liszt apparently slept through. The following day they played Emmanuel Chabrier's Trois valses romantiques for Liszt.

Vidal conducted at the Opéra National de Paris where he made his first appearance directing Gwendoline in 1894 (he had coached the singers for the Paris premiere in 1893), and later conducted the first performance of Ariane and the Paris premieres of Roma by Massenet, and L'étranger by d’Indy. He co-founded the Concerts de l’Opera with Georges Marty. He was Music Director of the Opéra-Comique from 1914 to 1919, conducting revivals of Alceste, Don Juan (the French version of Mozart's Don Giovanni), Iphigénie en Tauride, L'irato, Le Rêve and Thérèse. He also conducted the premieres of several operas and ballets. He taught at the Conservatoire de Paris, where his students included composers Lili Boulanger, Marc Delmas, Jacques Ibert and Vladimir Fédorov. See: List of music students by teacher: T to Z#Paul Vidal. He died in Paris, aged 67.

His brother Joseph Bernard Vidal (1859-1924) was also a composer.

== Compositions and pedagogy ==
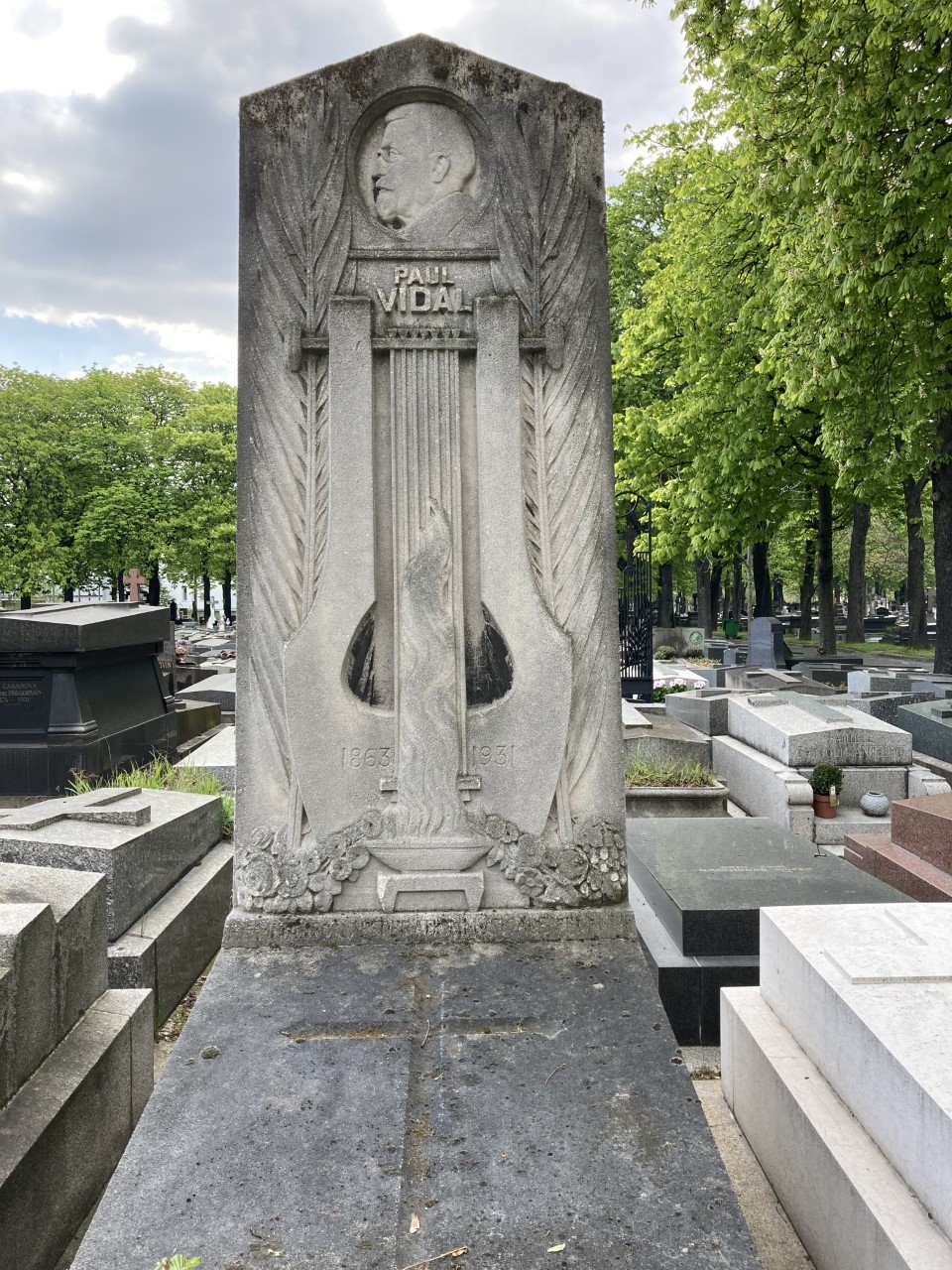
His grave in the cimetière des Batignolles

His compositions are virtually forgotten today: they include the operas Eros (1892), Guernica (1895) and La Burgonde (1898); ballets La Maladetta (1893) and Fête russe (1893, arr. - both choreographed by Joseph Hansen, Paris Opera); a cantata Ecce Sacerdos magnus; and incidental music to Théodore de Banville's Le Baiser (1888) and Catulle Mendès' La Reine Fiammette (1898). In collaboration with André Messager, he also orchestrated piano music of Frédéric Chopin into a Suite de danses (1913).

He is perhaps better known today through his keyboard harmony exercises, Recueil de basses et chants donnés which was a favorite teaching tool of his pupil, the legendary pedagogue Nadia Boulanger, and subsequently many of her students including Narcis Bonet who has republished a selection of these exercises under the title Paul Vidal, Nadia Boulanger: A Collection of Given Basses and Melodies.
