= La Sulamite =

Scène lyrique by Emmanuel Chabrier

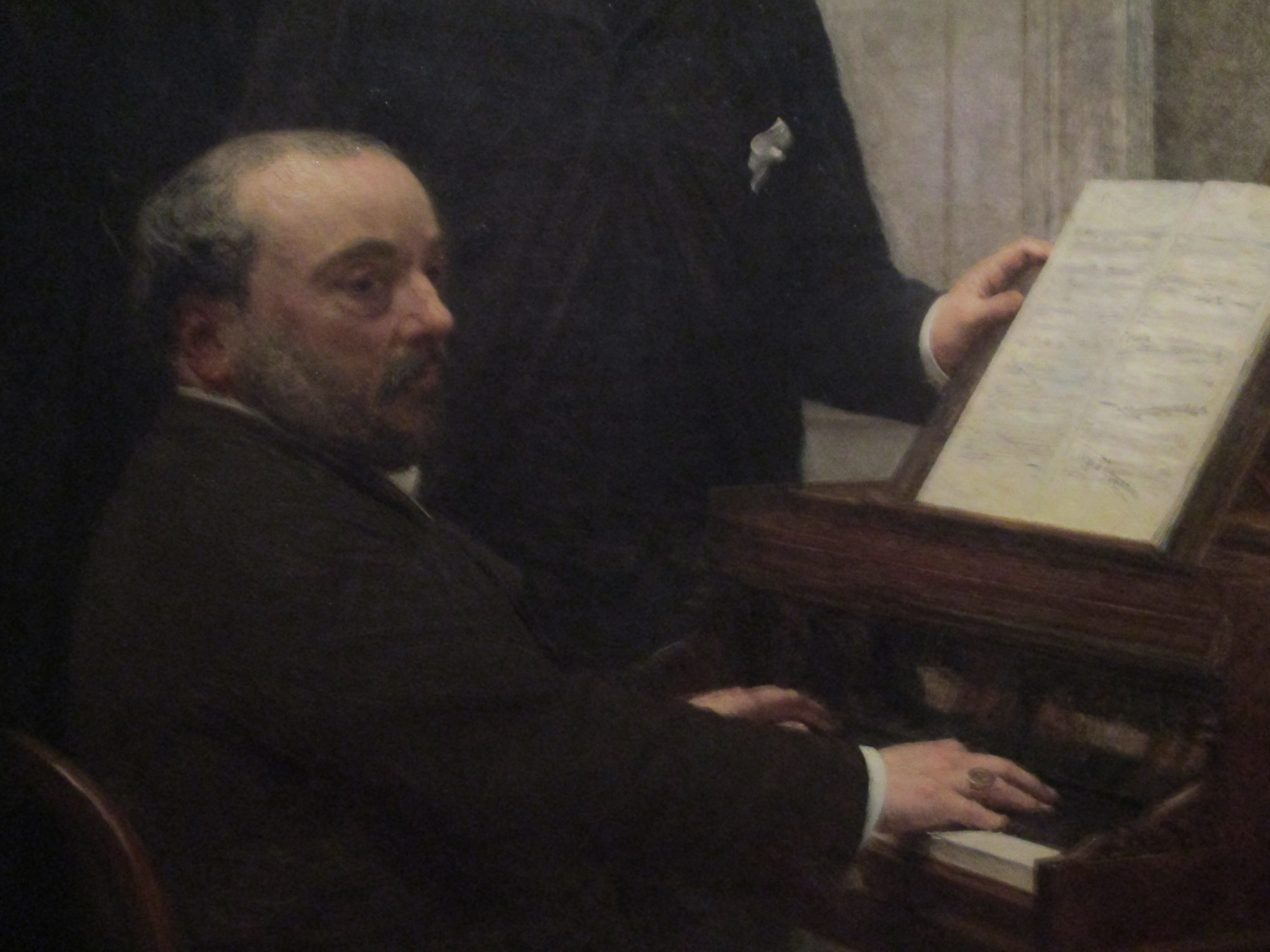
Detail of Autour du piano by Henri Fantin-Latour (1885) showing Emmanuel Chabrier at the piano

La Sulamite is a scène lyrique by Emmanuel Chabrier to words by Jean Richepin for solo voice, women's chorus and orchestra. The text of La Sulamite is based on extracts from The Song of Songs.

== Background ==
La Sulamite was first performed on 15 March 1885 at the Concerts Lamoureux, conducted by Charles Lamoureux with the mezzo soloist Mme Marie-Helene Brunet Lafleur (the second wife of Lamoureux), to whom the work is dedicated. A re-orchestrated version made by the composer in 1890 (with a similar dedication) was first performed by the same artists on 21 February 1892; that manuscript is now in the Morgan Library & Museum.

Chabrier had great difficulty in finding a convincing ending to the piece, even trying to get Lamoureux to help him. In the end though he was pleased with this work; in a letter to his publishers Enoch et Costallat he wrote "I am very attached to this work. It is difficult but will be less so in ten or twenty years from now".

According to Myers, the work has a glowing intensity and sensuous aura, and the writing for voices and instruments is free and uninhibited, enlivened by harmonic subtleties and bold and original modulations. Lecocq, checking the publisher's proofs, wrote jokingly to Chabrier of how amazing (épatant) the orchestration was, but also how complicated it was "for a simple musician like him".

Debussy confided to the critic and composer Gustave Samazeuilh that he was influenced by La Sulamite when writing La Damoiselle élue. Ravel was also an enthusiast, introducing the work to his friend Ricardo Viñes in 1897.

== The work ==
Within an oriental setting in high-walled gardens, the Sulamite, at first sad because of the absence of her loved one, soon feels his approach, calls him, sees him running and collapses finally in his arms in the longed-for ecstasy, among the delighted congratulations of her companions, happy with her good fortune.

La Sulamite is scored for a large orchestra of piccolo, 2 flutes, oboe, cor anglais, 2 B♭ clarinets, bass clarinet, 4 bassoons; 2 horns in F, 2 horns in E♭, 2 pistons in C, 2 trumpets in F, 3 trombones, tuba; timpani, antique cymbals in E♭, triangle, drum, bass drum, cymbals; 2 harps, violins, violas, cellos and double basses. The work lasts around 17 minutes.
