= Souvenirs de Munich =

Composition for piano four hands by Emmanuel Chabrier

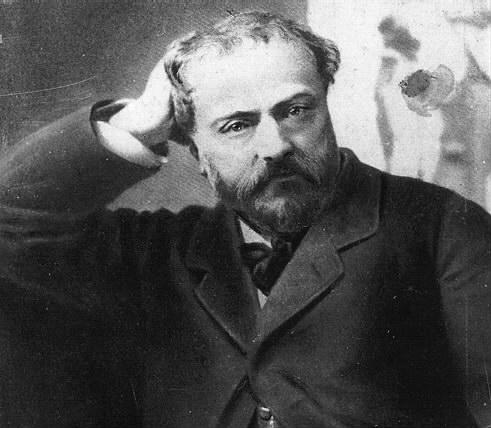
Emmanuel Chabrier in 1882

Souvenirs de Munich is a quadrille on themes from Wagner's Tristan and Isolde for piano four hands by Emmanuel Chabrier.

== Background ==
Chabrier's interest in Wagner dated from 1862, when as a study exercise he copied out the score of Tannhäuser. In early 1880 he requested time off from his ministry job to visit Munich that March with Duparc and other musician friends to go to a performance of Tristan und Isolde as it could only be seen there. The experience was a musical revelation for Chabrier. He wept upon hearing the Prelude: “I've waited ten years to hear that A on the cellos.” Chabrier, as assistant to Charles Lamoureux, helped in the rehearsals for the concert performances in Paris of Act I (1884) and Act II (1885) of Tristan.

Much as Chabrier admired the music of Wagner, he was still able to parody his work. Paul Griffiths writes "The piece is, of course, funny, but the parody isn’t anxious or spiteful. Chabrier’s laughter makes a good noise: it’s a wholehearted laughter. What is deeply loved can be deeply mocked." Chabrier regularly improvised works of this kind at the piano; Delage describes an evening dinner at the home of Lamoureux where an improvisation on themes from The Ring enraged Hans von Bülow. Poulenc described Souvenirs de Munich as "irresistibly funny", where Wagner's principal themes appear with "false beards and fake moustaches".

The exact date of the creation of Souvenirs de Munich is unknown, but it probably dates from 1887. Possibly with Offenbach's satire Le musicien de l'avenir in mind, it led to Fauré and Messager's Souvenirs de Bayreuth in similar vein.

== Music ==
The five movements follow the traditional layout of a musical quadrille

- Pantalon (C major, 2/4) uses themes of the sailors’ greeting to King Marke (Act 1), the Kareol leitmotif (Act III)
- Eté (G major, 2/4) uses themes of Ecstasy, Love call, Love song (Act II)
- Poule (C major, 6/8) uses themes of the shepherd's joyful tune (Act III), death song (Act II)
- Pastourelle (D major, 2/4) uses themes of Kurwenal's song
- Galop (F major, 2/4) Sailor's doleful song (Act I), Kurwenal's aria (Act I) and Longing for death (Act II)
