= Trois valses romantiques =

Set of three pieces for two pianos by Emmanuel Chabrier

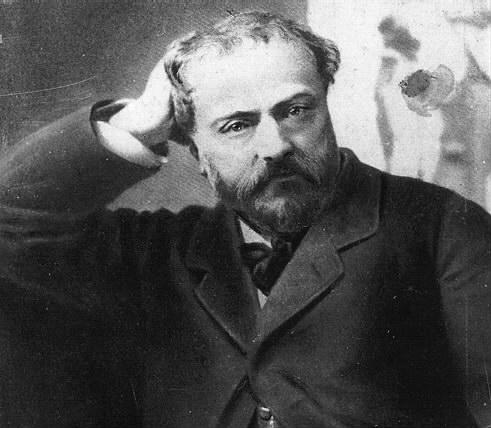
Emmanuel Chabrier in 1882

The Trois valses romantiques (Three Romantic Waltzes) are a set of three pieces for two pianos by Emmanuel Chabrier.

== History ==
Chabrier began the composition in mid 1880, completing the first two; the third was not completed until the summer of 1883. Chabrier wrote his friend Paul Lacôme that he was damned if he knew why he was writing them, as the Enochs (his publishers) will find them too long, too difficult; but that he thought they might sell well, particularly to young ladies who play the piano seriously. Myers notes the considerable demands made on players’ technique.

To inform his publisher Georges Costallat that he had finally managed to finish the third waltz, on 3 September 1883 he wrote a charade postcard, thus:
—Oiseau qui se pare des plumes du paon. (geai)
—Qualification de la nommée Carabosse. (fée)
—Note de la gamme. (la)
—Ousqu’il y avait un cheval de bois. (Troie)
—Peintre ordinaire de la place St Marc (Venise). (Ziem)
—Eau de table. (Vals)
Ah ! ah ! ah!
E. CH.
Ile-faulx-Hill-Luminais !

== Performance history ==
The waltzes were given their first public performance at the Société Nationale de Musique on 15 December 1883 with André Messager and the composer playing. Messager would later play them with Francis Poulenc. They are dedicated to the wife of Chabrier's publisher, Madame G. Costallat. For a performance in 1887, d’Indy wrote that Chabrier told him not to play the pieces as if they were by a member of the Institut! – this was followed by a lesson in playing Chabrier, wide a huge range of expression and interpretative detail.

Claude Debussy studied them at the Villa Medicis in 1885 with Paul Vidal, who together played them to Franz Liszt, who was visiting Rome in 1886. In 1893 at the Salle Pleyel, Maurice Ravel and Ricardo Viñes played them to Chabrier who spent an hour and a half giving them his encouragement and advice.

The waltzes were orchestrated by a champion of Chabrier's works, conductor-composer Felix Mottl, who also made the orchestral version of the same composer's Bourrée fantasque and Wagner's Wesendonck Lieder.

== The music ==
Delage notes the many novelties in the pieces – chains of ninths, methodic use of pentatonic scales in the third waltz, and sharp and spontaneous rhythms.

=== Valse I ===
The first waltz in D major is the shortest of the three: after an introductory carillon, the waltz spins along in bubbling form.

=== Valse II ===
The second waltz in E major is calmer than the first, with an opening fanfare anticipating the Fête Polonaise of Le roi malgré lui.

=== Valse III ===
The third waltz in F major is the culmination of the set, where certain passages presage Debussy (Prélude à l'après-midi d'un faune, "La terrasse au clair de lune" from the Préludes) and Ravel ("Jardin féeerique" from Ma Mère l'Oie).

== See also ==
- List of compositions for piano duo
