= Briséïs =

Operatic drame lyrique by Emmanuel Chabrier

Briséïs or Les amants de Corinthe
- Drame lyrique by Emmanuel Chabrier
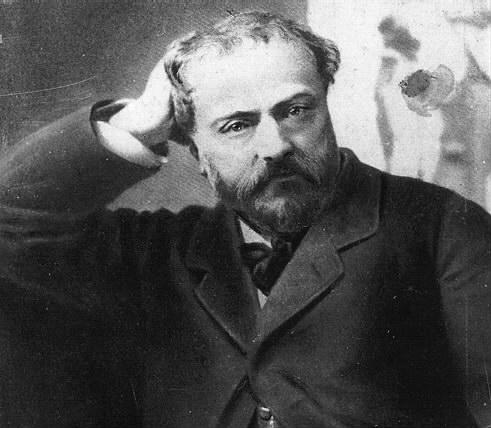
- Librettist: Catulle Mendès; Ephraïm Mikaël
- Based on: Die Braut von Korinth by Goethe

Briséïs or Les amants de Corinthe (Briséïs, or the Lovers of Corinth) is an operatic drame lyrique by Emmanuel Chabrier with libretto by Catulle Mendès and Ephraïm Mikaël after Goethe's Die Braut von Korinth.

== Composition and performance history ==
It seems likely that Catulle Mendès (who had already provided the libretto for Gwendoline and words for Chabrier's songs "Chanson de Jeanne" and "Lied"), saw potential for an opera in Ephraïm Mikhaël and Bernard Lazare's 'dramatic legend' La fiancée de Corinthe, and suggested the project to Chabrier. Chabrier worked on the opera from May 1888 until 1893 when his ill-health (paralysis in the late stages of syphilis) prevented any further progress.

The first act (which lasts around 75 minutes) was in a finished enough state by the end of June 1890 for Chabrier to play it to Mendès – the orchestration was then completed by the end of September of that year. In 1894 Chabrier asked Vincent d'Indy to complete the work, but it was too difficult to piece together the sketches. Due to illness, Chabrier only completed the first act (of the three projected), which was premiered at a Chabrier memorial concert in Paris on 13 January 1897, conducted by Charles Lamoureux. Chabrier's heirs also asked other composers – including Debussy, Enescu and Ravel – to try to complete it.

The first staging of act 1 took place at the Neues Königliches Opernhaus in Berlin on 14 January 1899, conducted by Richard Strauss. Briséïs is highly erotic and seductively scored music, which Strauss may well have remembered when he came to compose Salome.

The Vichy Festival staged Briséïs in a programme with Béatrice et Bénédict in 1954 with Janette Vivalda in the title role, conducted by Paul Bastide.

The manuscript is at the Bibliothèque de l'Opéra, Paris. The publication of the score in 1897 included a limited edition with a portrait by Desmoulins, tributes by several friends and composers (Bruneau, Charpentier, Chausson, D'Indy, Lamoureux, Messager and Mottl), as well as poems in Chabrier's memory by de Régnier, Saint-Pol-Roux, van Lerberghe and Viélé-Griffin.

Goldmark's opera Die Kriegsgefangene (1899) was originally to be called Briseis, although the subject matter is different.

== Roles ==
Role	Voice type	Premiere cast, 13 January 1897 (Conductor: Charles Lamoureux)	Stage premiere, 14 January 1899 (Conductor: Richard Strauss)
Briséïs	soprano	Éléonore Blanc	Ida Hiedler
Hylas	tenor	Pierre-Émile Engel	Wilhelm Grüning
Le Catéchiste	baritone	Alexis Ghasne	Baptist Hoffmann
Stratoklès, servant to Thanastô	bass	M. Nicolaou	Paul Knüpfer
Thanastô	mezzo-soprano	Alba Chrétien-Vaguet	Marie Goetze
First maidservant	soprano		
Second maidservant	soprano		
Old sailor			
Another sailor			
Chorus : Sailors; Servants of Thanastô

== Synopsis ==
Place: Corinth
Time: during Emperor Hadrian's reign.

=== Act 1 ===
Scene 1

Hylas, in love with Briséïs, wishes to find fortune in Syria but pauses at the house where she lives with her sick mother Thanastô. As Briséïs appears, Hylas invokes Eros.

Scene 2

Briséïs and Hylas swear by Kypris [Aphrodite] to love each other until their last days. Briséïs insists that love must survive death into the tomb. Hylas leaves.

Scene 3

Thanastô implores God to save her to save the souls of the pagans around her, while regretting that her daughter does not share her Christian beliefs. Briséïs while fearful of the temptations facing Hylas vows to save her mother wracked by sickness and pain.

Scene 4

While the servants and Briséïs invoke the pagan gods, the Catechist arrives and prays for Thanastô, telling Briséïs that if she follows him her mother will be saved. Thanastô had promised her daughter to remain a virgin 'in eternity, a bride of God'. Briséïs submits and follows the Catechist.

=== Acts 2 & 3 ===
(Shipwrecked on the spot where Briséïs has been baptized, Hylas reminds her of her vow to him. Briséïs kills herself and then calls upon Hylas to join her in the nuptial grave. After breathing the deadly scent of the flowers she offers him, he does, to the wonder of Christians and pagans.)

== Recordings ==
- Hyperion 1994: Joan Rodgers - Mark Padmore - Simon Keenlyside - Michael George - Kathryn Harries - conductor Jean Yves Ossonce. Chorus of Scottish Opera, BBC Scottish Symphony Orchestra (CDA66803) (recording of the UK premiere concert performance at the Usher Hall on 18 August 1994).
