= Roy Howat =

Scottish pianist and musicologist

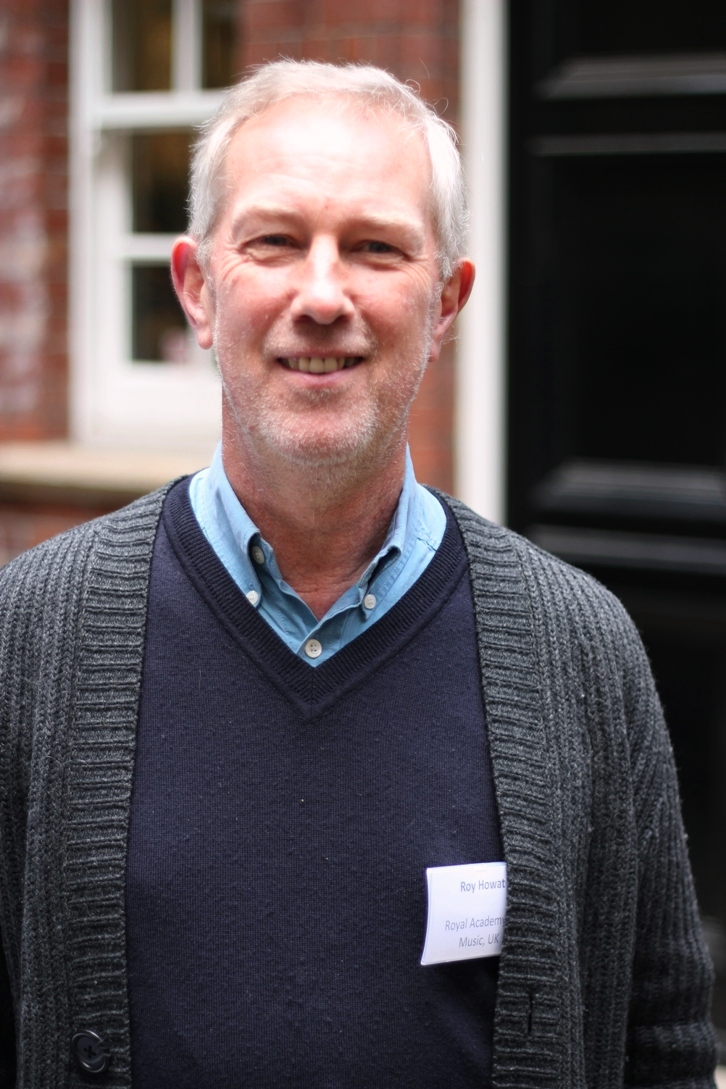
Roy Howat outside Gresham College

Roy Howat (born 1951) is a Scottish pianist and musicologist, who specializes in French music. Howat has been Keyboard Research Fellow at the Royal Academy of Music in London since 2003, and Research Fellow at the Royal Conservatoire of Scotland since 2013.

== Biography ==
Howat was born in Ayrshire, Scotland. His mother was Czech, his father Scots. He was educated at Ardrossan Academy in Ayrshire and King's College, Cambridge, where he graduated with a first-class degree in Music in 1974. He has also studied under Vlado Perlemuter in Paris.

He is married to the Australian pianist and musical writer Emily Kilpatrick.

== Publications ==
He is one of the founding editors, with Pierre Boulez, François Lesure and others, of the Paris-based Complete Debussy Edition (Œuvres Complètes de Claude Debussy), for which he has edited much of the piano music. His other publications include the books Debussy in Proportion and The Art of French piano music, Urtext volumes of Chabrier and Fauré, an English edition of Jean-Jacques Eigeldinger's Chopin, Pianist and Teacher, and chapters in numerous other books on Schubert, Chopin, Debussy, Ravel, Bartók and others.

== Performances ==
His recordings include major piano and chamber works by composers including Debussy, Chabrier, Fauré and Pierné. In 2001 he toured in Egypt as both pianist and violist with the Sarastro Ensemble. More recent performances include those with the Panocha Quartet in Japan, the Czech Republic and the UK (including the Wigmore Hall).
