= Joyeuse marche =

Orchestra piece by Emmanuel Chabrier

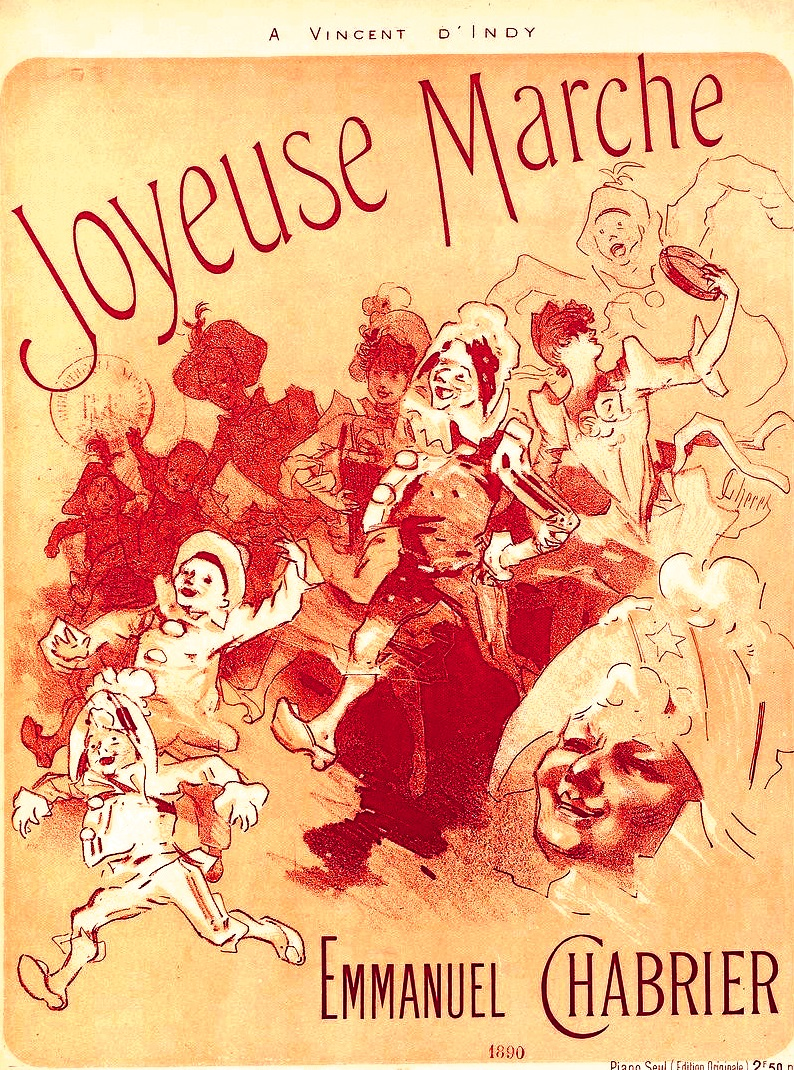
1890 edition of Joyeuse marche

Joyeuse marche is a popular orchestra piece by the French composer Emmanuel Chabrier. It is the second half of a pair of orchestral pieces (the other was Prélude pastoral) first performed on 4 November 1888 in Angers, conducted by the composer. The Joyeuse marche is dedicated to Vincent d'Indy.

== Background ==
The march went through several versions before arriving at the popular orchestral version known today.

In September 1888 Chabrier wrote to his publisher that he would be orchestrating six piano pieces: four pieces from his piano suite Pièces pittoresques (which would become his Suite pastorale), as well as La marche française and the Andante in F. Delage proposes that the Andante was originally performed in 1875 at the Cercle de l'Union artistique in Paris, with Jules Danbé conducting his orchestra. However, the pieces are also related to Chabrier's Prélude et marche française for piano 4-hands, completed by May 1885, the Andante having by then become a Prélude.

The concert at which the premiere of the Prélude pastoral and Joyeuse marche took place also included the first performance of Chabrier's Suite pastorale and Habañera, España (all conducted by the composer), plus Rossini's William Tell Overture, Mozart's Divertimento No. 2 for two horns and strings and the Adagietto from Bizet's L'Arlésienne.

By the time of the Paris premiere in April 1889, the title had changed to Marche joyeuse. The piece was again enthusiastically received.

The final version of the work's title was reached at a Lamoureux concert on 16 February 1890, when the march became the Joyeuse marche. However, the Prélude then disappeared until it surfaced among autographs belonging to Robert Brussel in 1943. The Joyeuse marche became particularly popular, and was also played in a piano duet version.

The tempo marking for the march is 'Tempo di marcia molto risoluto e giocoso'.

== Keyboard versions ==
- Prélude et marche française for piano 4-hands, completed by May 1885
- Joyeuse marche for piano, four-hands - 1889
- Transcriptions of Joyeuse marche for piano, four-hands for piano (1890) and for two pianos (1891) by Ernest Alder

== Instrumentation ==
Strings; 2 flutes, 1 piccolo, 2 oboes, 2 clarinets in B flat, 4 bassoons; 4 horns in F, 2 cornets à piston, 2 trumpets, 3 trombones, tuba; timpani, percussion (bass drum, cymbals, side drum, triangle); harp.
