= Orchestre Lamoureux =

French orchestra

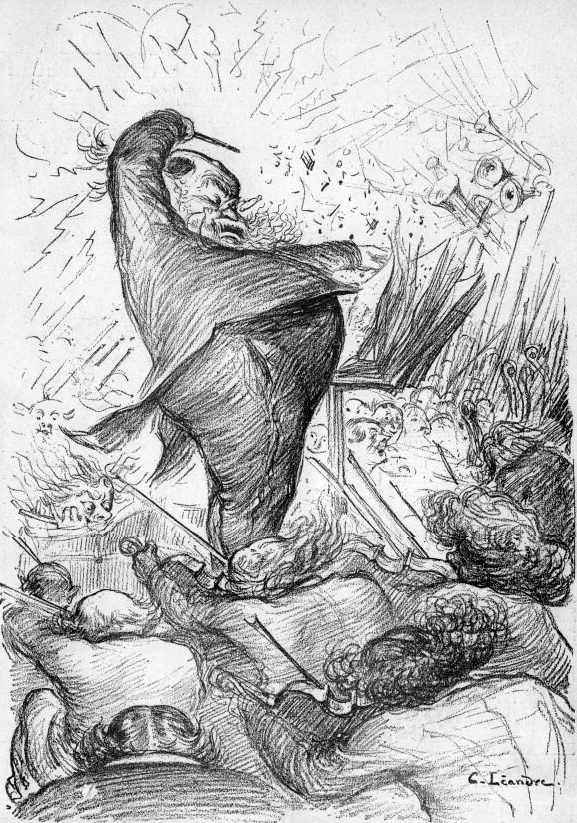
"M. Lamoureux letting out a fortissimo", by Charles Léandre, 1890s

The Orchestre Lamoureux (pronounced [ɔʁ.kɛstʁ la.mu.ʁø]) officially known as the Société des Nouveaux-Concerts and also known as the Concerts Lamoureux) is an orchestral concert society which once gave weekly concerts by its own orchestra, founded in Paris by Charles Lamoureux in 1881. It has played an important role in French musical life, including giving the premieres of Emmanuel Chabrier's España (1883), Gabriel Fauré's Pavane (1888), Claude Debussy's Nocturnes (1900 and 1901) and La mer (1905), Maurice Ravel's Menuet antique (1930) and Piano Concerto in G major (1932).

== Principal conductors ==
- Charles Lamoureux (1881–1897)
- Camille Chevillard (1897–1923)
- Paul Paray (1923–1928)
- Albert Wolff (1928–1934)
- Eugène Bigot (1935–1950)
- Jean Martinon (1951–1957)
- Igor Markevitch (1957–1961)
- Jean-Baptiste Mari
- Jean Claude Bernède (1979–1991)
- Valentin Kojin (1991–1993)
- Yutaka Sado (1993–2011)
- Fayçal Karoui (2011–2015)
- Adrien Perruchon (2021–present)
