= España (Chabrier) =

1883 orchestral piece by Emmanuel Chabrier

"España" (chamber orchestra)
Performed by the Strolling Strings of the United States Air Force Band

España, rhapsody for orchestra (French: España, rapsodie pour orchestre or Rapsodie España) is the most famous orchestral composition by French composer Emmanuel Chabrier (1841–1894). Written in 1883 after a trip to Spain, it was dedicated to the conductor Charles Lamoureux, who conducted the first public performance on 4 November 1883, at the Théâtre du Château d’Eau for the Société des Nouveaux Concerts in Paris.

== Background ==
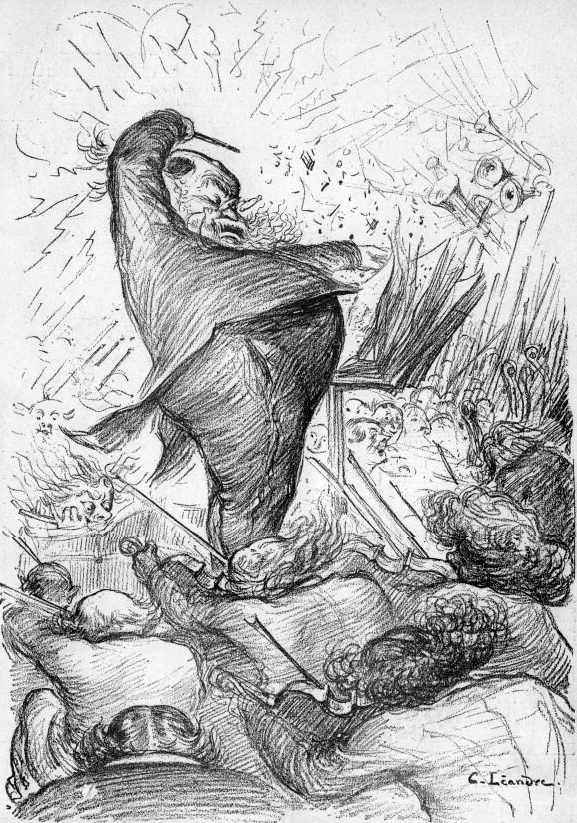
Lamoureux, who conducted España's premiere, unleashing a fortissimo – drawing by Léandre in Le Rire, 1890s.

From July to December 1882, Chabrier and his wife toured Spain, taking in San Sebastián, Burgos, Toledo, Sevilla, Granada, Málaga, Cádiz, Córdoba, Valencia, Zaragoza and Barcelona. His letters written during his travels are full of good humour, keen observation and his reactions to the music and dance he came across—and demonstrate his genuine literary gift. In a letter to Édouard Moullé (1845–1923), a long-time musician friend of Chabrier (himself interested in folk music of Normandy and Spain), the composer details his researches into regional dance forms, giving notated musical examples. A later letter to Lamoureux, from Cádiz, dated 25 October (in Spanish) has Chabrier writing that on his return to Paris he would compose an 'extraordinary fantasia' which would incite the audience to a pitch of excitement, and that even Lamoureux would be obliged to hug the orchestral leader in his arms, so voluptuous would be his melodies.

Although at first Chabrier worked on the piece for piano duet, this evolved into a work for full orchestra. Composed between January and August 1883, it was originally called Jota but this became España in October 1883. Encored at its first performance, and received well by the critics, it sealed Chabrier's fame overnight. The work was praised by Lecocq, Duparc, Hahn, Falla (who did not think any Spanish composer had succeeded in achieving so genuine a version of the jota), and even Mahler (who declared it to be "the start of modern music" to musicians of the New York Philharmonic). Chabrier more than once described it as "a piece in F and nothing more".

== Music ==
After a short guitar-like introduction, the first theme appears low on muted trumpets, and recurs four times during the piece. This is followed by a flowing second theme (bassoons, horns, cellos). Bassoons introduce another idea ben giocoso, sempre con impeto after which instrumental sections take up a dialogue with another highly rhythmic theme. After a return to the first theme, another flowing melody dolce espressivo on upper strings leads to a climax only broken by a marcato theme on trombones. Instrumental and thematic variants lead the piece to its ecstatic and joyous conclusion.

Chabrier's España inaugurated the vogue for hispanically flavoured music which found further expression in Debussy's Ibéria and Ravel's Rapsodie espagnole. Erik Satie parodied this trend in his piano piece Españaña from the suite Croquis et agaceries d'un gros bonhomme en bois (1913).

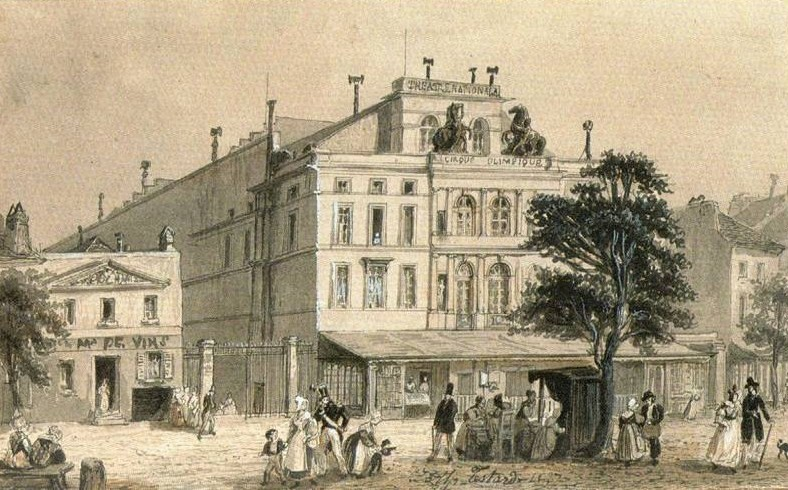
Cirque Olympique, where España was first heard (Jacques Testard, ink and gouache).

== Orchestration ==
Strings; 3 flutes (1 piccolo), 2 oboes, 2 clarinets in B♭, 4 bassoons; 2 horns in F (chromatiques), 2 horns in C (ordinaires), 2 trumpets, 2 cornets à piston, 3 trombones, tuba; timpani, percussion (bass drum, cymbals, triangle, tambourine); 2 harps and strings.

Metronome marking: . = 80. Performances generally last between 6 and 6½ minutes.

Chabrier made two transcriptions of España:

- Song for soprano and piano
- Two pianos

== Other appearances ==
Parts of España feature prominently in Émile Waldteufel's waltz España of 1886. It is also the basis of the melody of the 1956 American popular song "Hot Diggity (Dog Ziggity Boom)" by Al Hoffman and Dick Manning.

Erik Satie quoted España heavily in Españaña, the third piece of Croquis et agaceries d'un gros bonhomme en bois (1913), spoofing the fad for Spanish music in France at the time.

In 1961 Roland Petit created a ballet entitled España using the score of Emmanuel Chabrier; costumes were by Yves Saint Laurent.

== Recordings ==
- Ernest Ansermet and the Orchestre de la Suisse Romande (Decca)
- Paul Paray and the Detroit Symphony Orchestra (Alto)
- John Eliot Gardiner and the Vienna Philharmonic (DG)
- Armin Jordan and the Orchestre Nationale de France (Erato)
- Mariss Jansons and the Bavarian Radio Symphony Orchestra (BR-Klassik)
- Hervé Niquet and the Monte-Carlo Philharmonic Orchestra (Naxos)
- Domingo Hindoyan and the Royal Liverpool Philharmonic (Onyx)
- John Wilson and the Sinfonia of London (Chandos)
- François-Xavier Roth and Les Siècles (Actes Sud)
