= Vaucochard et fils Ier =

Unfinished opérette by Emmanuel Chabrier

- Opérette by Emmanuel Chabrier
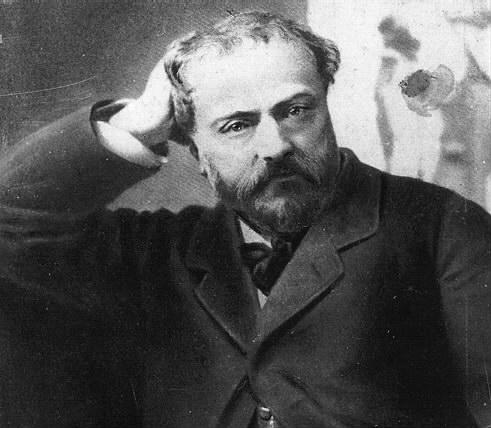
- French
- Librettist: Paul Verlaine

Vaucochard et fils Ier is an unfinished opérette by Emmanuel Chabrier of which only some numbers survive. The French libretto was by Paul Verlaine.

== Background ==
In the early 1860s Chabrier was a close friend of Verlaine and dined at the Verlaines' house, rue Lecluze every Saturday from 1860–1863. With Verlaine and Chabrier, the friends who met together there included Albert Mérat, Adolphe Racot, François Coppée, Louis-Xavier de Ricard and Édouard Lepelletier.

Although Roger Delage has dated Chabrier’s work on the score of Vaucochard et fils Ier to around 1864, Verlaine continued to mention work for the project for several years after. Only four complete numbers exist from this early comic piece where the cowardly but bawdy title role is a satire of Napoleon III.

In this, one of Chabrier's earliest works, Poulenc discerned elements of the composer's true style in the 'Chanson de l'homme armé', while Delage notes two future favourite rhythms of the composer – the waltz in the duo for Aglaé and Médéric and the bourrée in the trio finale.

== Performance history ==
The surviving numbers from Vaucochard et fils Ier were first performed on 22 April 1941 at the Salle du Conservatoire, Paris with Germaine Cernay, Lucienne Trajin, Paul Derenne and Roger Bourdin, conducted by Roger Désormière. A recording of the four numbers was made in Strasbourg in 1992, conducted by Roger Delage.

== Roles ==
Role	Voice type	Premiere Cast, 22 April 1941
Douyoudou	mezzo-soprano	Germaine Cernay
Aglaé	soprano	Lucienne Trajin
Médéric	baritone	Roger Bourdin
Vaucochard	tenor	Paul Derenne
