= Emmanuel Chabrier =

French composer and pianist (1841–1894)

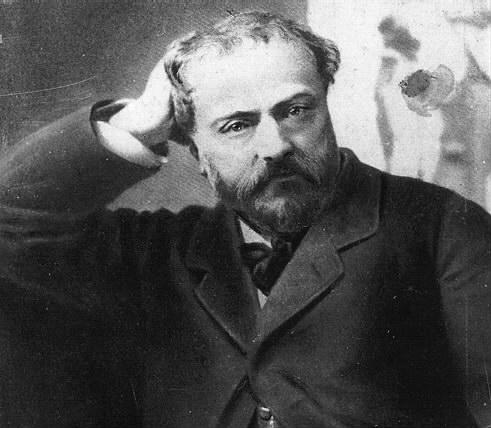
Chabrier in 1882

Alexis-Emmanuel Chabrier (French: [ɛmanɥɛl ʃabʁie]; 18 January 1841 – 13 September 1894) was a French Romantic composer and pianist. His bourgeois family did not approve of a musical career for him, and he studied law in Paris and then worked as a civil servant until the age of thirty-nine while immersing himself in the modernist artistic life of the French capital and composing in his spare time. From 1880 until his final illness he was a full-time composer.

Although known primarily for two of his orchestral works, España and Joyeuse marche, Chabrier left a corpus of operas (including L'étoile), songs, and piano music, but no symphonies, concertos, quartets, sonatas, or religious or liturgical music. His lack of academic training left him free to create his own musical language, unaffected by established rules, and he was regarded by many later composers as an important innovator and a catalyst who paved the way for French modernism. He was admired by, and influenced, composers as diverse as Debussy, Ravel, Richard Strauss, Satie, Poulenc, Stravinsky, and others of the group of composers known as Les Six. Writing at a time when French musicians were generally proponents or opponents of the music of Wagner, Chabrier steered a middle course, sometimes incorporating Wagnerian traits into his music and at other times avoiding them.

Chabrier was associated with some of the leading writers and painters of his time. Among his closest friends was the painter Édouard Manet, and Chabrier collected Impressionist paintings long before they became fashionable. A number of such paintings from his personal collection by artists known to him are now housed in some of the world's leading art museums. He penned a large number of letters to friends and colleagues which offer an insight into his musical opinions and character.

Chabrier died in Paris at the age of fifty-three from a neurological disease, probably caused by syphilis.

== Life ==
=== Early years ===
Chabrier's birthplace in Ambert

Chabrier was born in Ambert, (Puy-de-Dôme), a town in the Auvergne region of central France. He was the only son of a lawyer, Jean Chabrier, and his wife, Marie-Anne-Evelina, née Durosay or Durozay. The Chabriers were of old Auvergne stock, originally of peasant origin (the surname comes from "chevrier" – goat-herd), but in recent generations merchants and lawyers had predominated in the family. A key member of the household was the boy's nanny Anne Delayre (whom he called "Nanine" and "Nanon"), who remained close to him throughout her life. (Note: (Dates 1819–1891), she became more than a servant to Chabrier's parents, and on their deaths in 1869 insisted on remaining as domestic to Emmanuel for no pay; she was nanny to his children, and a key link to his Auvergnat childhood.)

Chabrier began taking music lessons at the age of six; his early teachers were from cosmopolitan backgrounds: at Ambert he studied with a Carlist Spanish refugee called Saporta, and after the family moved to Clermont-Ferrand in 1852 he studied at the Lycée imperial with a Polish musician, Alexander Tarnovsky . The earliest of Chabrier's compositions to survive in manuscript are piano works from 1849. A piano piece, Le Scalp!!! (1856) was later modified into the Marche des Cipayes (1863). The first piece to which the composer gave an opus number was a waltz for piano, Julia, op. 1, 1857.

Tarnovsky advised Chabrier's parents that their son was talented enough to pursue a musical career, but Jean Chabrier was determined that his son should follow him into the legal profession. He moved the family to Paris in 1856, so that Chabrier could enrol at the Lycée Saint-Louis. From there Chabrier went on to law school, but did not neglect music, continuing his studies in composition, violin and piano. After graduating from the law school in 1861 he joined the French civil service at the Ministry of the Interior, where he worked for nineteen years.

=== Paris: dual harness ===
Chabrier was well regarded at the ministry, but his passion was music, to which he devoted his free time. He continued his studies, with teachers including Edouard Wolff (de) (piano), Richard Hammer (violin), Théophile Semet (fr) and Aristide Hignard (both composition). In a study of the composer published in 1935 Jacques-Gabriel Prod'homme commented that it would be wrong to class Chabrier as merely an amateur in this period: "For, while in quest of the technique of his art, he displayed a curiosity in the painting and literature of the 'modernists' of his day that, among musicians, had few parallels."

From 1862 Chabrier was among the circle of the Parnassians in Paris. Among his friends were Auguste Villiers de l'Isle-Adam and Paul Verlaine; with the latter he planned a comic opera in the fashionable style of Offenbach, Vaucochard et fils Ier. He did not complete it, but four fragments (dating from about 1864 or 1865) have survived. His full-time official post severely restricted Chabrier's ability to compose large-scale works. He began an opera on a Hungarian historical theme entitled Jean Hunyade, to a libretto by Henry Fouquier, but abandoned it, after completing four numbers, in 1867. In December 1872 he scored a success at a private theatre club, the Cercle de l'union artistique with a three-act opérette bouffe Le Service obligatoire written in collaboration with two other composers, and which according to Victorin de Joncières was acclaimed by the audience as undoubted proof of Chabrier's talent. Another attempt at operatic comedy, Fisch-Ton-Kan, with Verlaine and Lucien Viotti, was performed in March 1875 at the same club with Chabrier at the piano; five fragments survive. (Note: Some sources date Fisch-Ton-Kan as the earlier of the two collaborations.) He did not set any poems by Villiers de L'Isle Adam or Verlaine, although the latter wrote a sonnet À Emmanuel Chabrier (published in Amour, 1888) as a remembrance of their friendship.

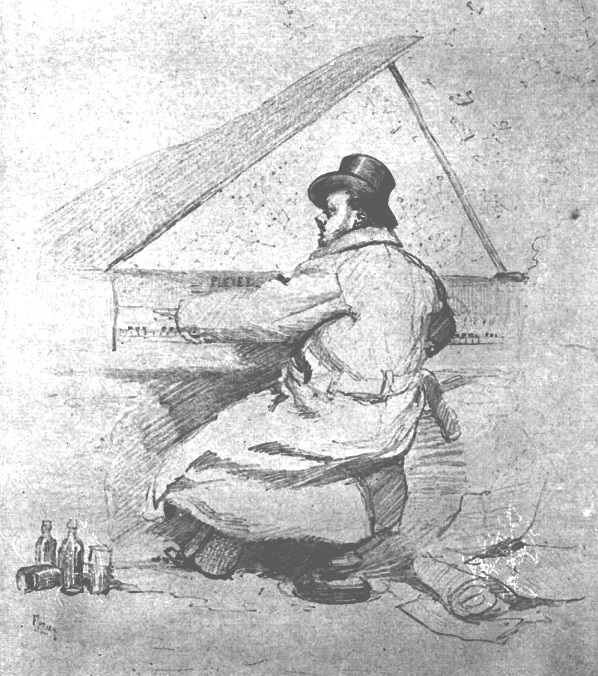
Chabrier by Édouard Detaille (1873)

There are several descriptions of Chabrier's piano-playing at around this time; many years later the composer Vincent d'Indy wrote, "Though his arms were too short, his fingers too thick and his whole manner somewhat clumsy, he managed to achieve a degree of finesse and a command of expression that very few pianists – with the exception of Liszt and Rubinstein – have surpassed." The composer and critic Alfred Bruneau said of Chabrier, "he played the piano as no one has ever played it before, or ever will…" The wife of the painter Renoir, a friend of the composer, wrote:

One day Chabrier came; and he played his España for me. It sounded as if a hurricane had been let loose. He pounded and pounded the keyboard. [The street] was full of people, and they were listening, fascinated. When Chabrier reached the last crashing chords, I swore to myself I would never touch the piano again […] Besides, Chabrier had broken several strings and put the piano out of action."

Both Chabrier's parents died within the space of eight days in 1869. During the Franco-Prussian War (1870–1871) and Commune, he continued in his official post as the ministry moved from Tours to Bordeaux then to Versailles. In 1873 he married Marie Alice Dejean, the granddaughter of Louis Dejean, who had gained his fortune as founder and manager of the Cirque d'été and the Cirque Napoléon. Alice and Chabrier had three sons, one of whom died at birth. Chabrier's friends in Paris included the composers Gabriel Fauré, Ernest Chausson, and Vincent d'Indy; painters including Henri Fantin-Latour, Edgar Degas and Édouard Manet, whose Thursday soirées Chabrier attended; and writers such as Émile Zola, Alphonse Daudet, Jean Moréas, Jean Richepin and Stéphane Mallarmé.

During the 1870s Chabrier began several stage works. The first to be completed was a three-act opéra-bouffe L'étoile (The Star), commissioned by the Bouffes-Parisiens, the spiritual home of Offenbach. He secured the commission through his many contacts in the world of arts and letters: he had met the librettists, Albert Vanloo and Eugène Leterrier through the painter Alphonse Hirsch, whom he had got to know as a member of Manet's set. The opera was modestly successful, running for 48 performances in 1877, but was not revived in his lifetime. (Note: Francis Poulenc, citing an earlier biographer of Chabrier, René Martineau, suggests that the run was deliberately curtailed by the theatre management to avoid costly royalty payments after notching 50 performances.) Nonetheless, it brought him to the attention of the press and attracted the publishing firm Enoch & Costallat, who published his works during the rest of his life. Above all, as a result of L'étoile he ceased to be regarded as a talented amateur. The same year Saint-Saens gave the first public performance of his 1865 Impromptu, his first piano piece of real importance with his personal stamp of originality.

=== Full-time composer ===
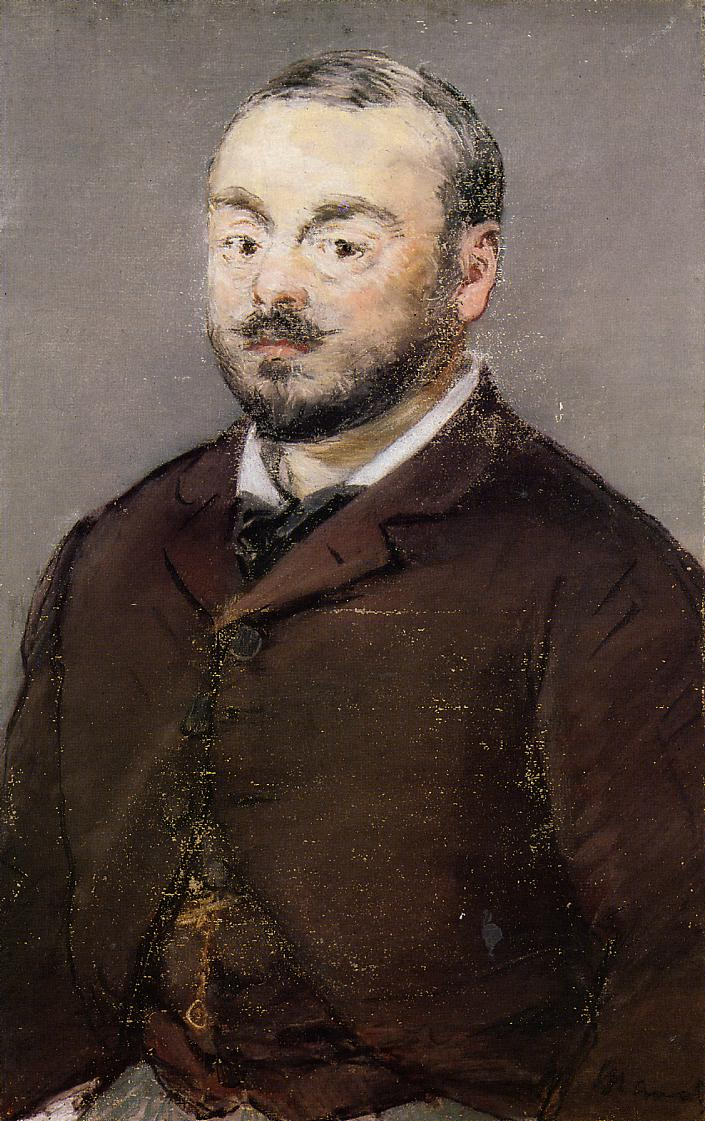
Chabrier, 1880, by Manet, Ordrupgaard Museum, Denmark

Like many progressively-minded French composers of the time, Chabrier was greatly interested in the music of Wagner. As a young man he had copied out the full score of Tannhäuser to gain an insight into the composer's creative process. On a trip to Munich with Henri Duparc and others in March 1880, Chabrier first saw Wagner's opera Tristan und Isolde; he wrote to the personnel director at the ministry saying he had to go to Bordeaux on private matters, but in confidence confessed that for ten years he had wanted to see and hear Wagner's opera, and promised that he would back at his desk the following Wednesday. D'Indy, who was among the group, recorded that Chabrier was moved to tears at hearing the music, saying of the prelude, "I have waited ten years of my life to hear that A in the cellos".

This event led Chabrier to conclude that he must single-mindedly pursue his vocation as a composer, and after several periods of absence he left the Ministry of the Interior in late 1880. In a 2001 study, Steven Huebner writes that there may have been additional factors in Chabrier's decision: "the growing momentum of his musical career … his high hopes for the Gwendoline project, and the first signs of a nervous disorder, probably the result of a syphilitic condition, that would claim his life 14 years later."

The project to which Huebner refers was the operatic tragedy Gwendoline, on which Chabrier had begun working in 1879. The librettist was Catulle Mendès, described by the pianist and scholar Graham Johnson as "a relentlessly ambitious member of the literary establishment". Mendès wrote texts that were set by at least seven French composers, including Fauré, Massenet, Debussy and Messager; none of his operatic works were successful, and Johnson rates the libretto for Gwendoline as "catastrophic". Chabrier worked on the piece until 1885.

The conductor Charles Lamoureux appointed Chabrier as his chorus master and répétiteur, and included his music in the Lamoureux Orchestra's concerts. In 1881 Chabrier's piano cycle Pièces pittoresques was premiered. César Franck commented, "We have just heard something extraordinary: this music links our time with that of Couperin and Rameau". Chabrier travelled to London (1882) and Brussels (1883) to hear Wagner's Ring cycle, and in 1882 Chabrier and his wife visited Spain, which resulted in his most famous work, España (1883), a mixture of popular airs he had heard and his own original themes. It was premiered under its dedicatee, Lamoureux, in November 1883. It met with what Poulenc calls "immediate and rapturous success", made Chabrier's reputation, and by public demand received multiple performances over the next months. Admirers included de Falla, who stated that he did not think any Spanish composer had succeeded in achieving so genuine a version of the jota as in the piece.

The Paris Opéra declined to present Gwendoline, which was premiered at La Monnaie in Brussels under Henry Verdhurdt in 1886. It was well received, but closed after two performances because the impresario went bankrupt. William Mann wrote of the music that "in full, rapturous cognizance of mature Wagner", Chabrier composed "great music ...such as the long solo and choral ensemble, 'Soyez unis', and all the love duet music, and there is more Frenchman than Wagner in them, above all in the final Liebestod".

While striving for a staging of his opera Chabrier was also working on some of his mature songs – Sommation irrespectueuse, Tes yeux bleus, Chanson pour Jeanne, Lied, as well as a lyric scene for mezzo, women's chorus and orchestra La Sulamite and the piano version of the Joyeuse Marche. He then found a new lyric project to tackle – Le roi malgré lui (The King in Spite of Himself) – and completed the score in six months. It was premiered at the Opéra-Comique in Paris, and a favourable reception seemed to promise a successful run, but the theatre burned down after the third performance. Through Chabrier's friendship with the Belgian tenor Ernest van Dyck and subsequently the conductor Felix Mottl, directors of opera houses in Leipzig and Munich expressed interest in both works and Chabrier made several happy trips to Germany as a result; his works were given in seven German cities. In July 1888 he was appointed as a Chevalier de la Légion d'honneur.

Chabrier left a rich and exuberant body of correspondence; Rollo Myers sees the "letter-writer's gift of spontaneous self-expression, with no undertones of insincerity or of writing for effect". He expressed himself in "Rabelaisian language" and "laced with a profusion of racy slang". In 1994 the musical scholar Roger Delage, with Frans Durif and Thierry Bodin, produced a 1,300 page edition of the composer's correspondence, containing 1,149 letters, ranging from those to his family and Nanine, exchanges with contemporary friends in the musical world (sometimes with musical quotations), negotiations with publishers, and one a commiseration with his son André on the death of his pet bird (with gentle reproach for having over-fed the creature).

=== Decline and final years ===
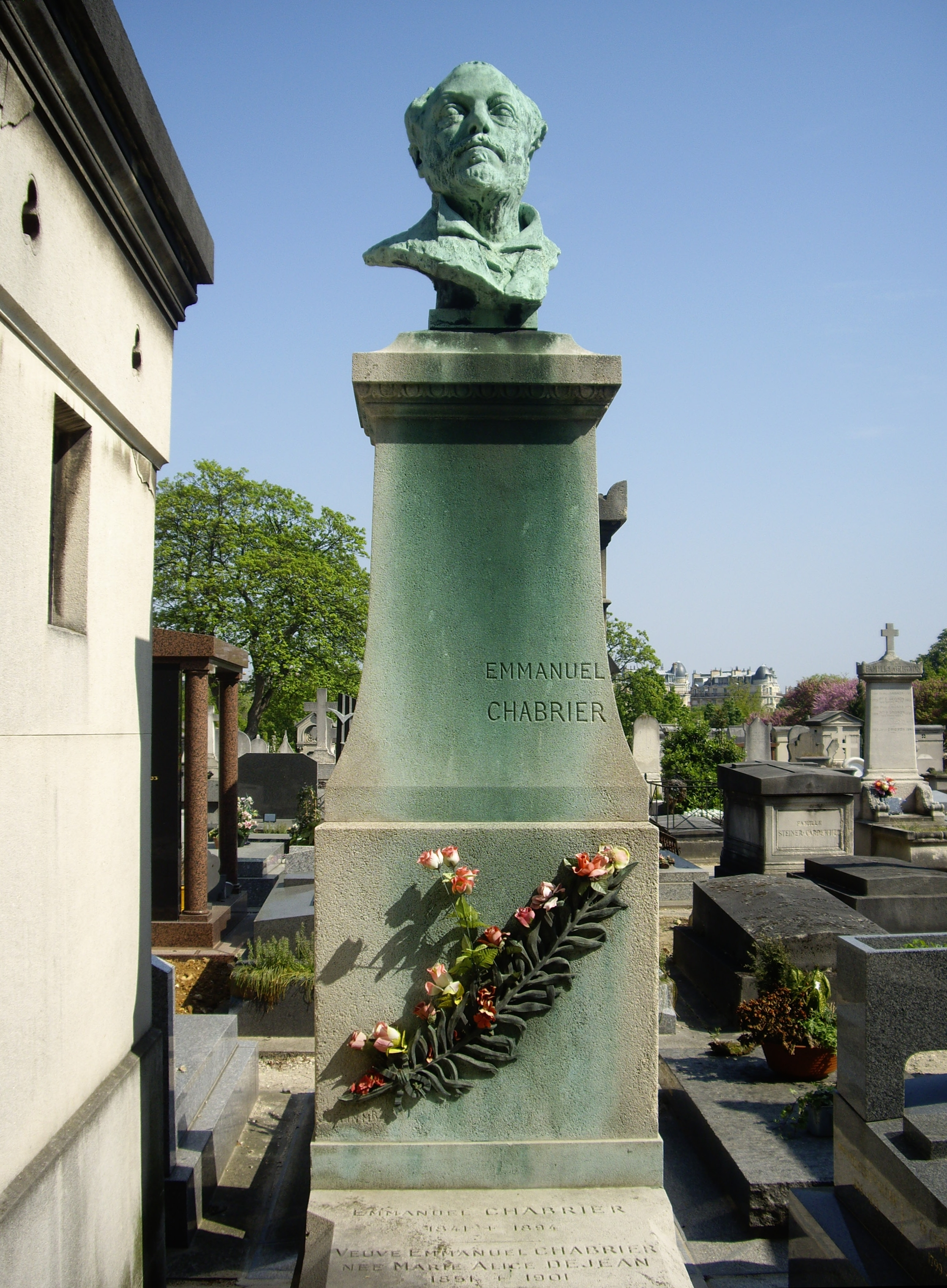
Chabrier's tomb, Montparnasse cemetery (division 9), Paris.

In his final years, Chabrier was troubled by financial problems caused by the collapse of his bankers, failing health brought on by the terminal stage of syphilis, and depression about the neglect of his stage works in France. The death of his beloved "Nanine" in January 1891 greatly affected him. In 1892, he wrote to his friend Charles Lecocq, "Never has an artist more loved, more tried to honour music than me, none has suffered more from it; and I will go on suffering from it for ever". (Note: "Jamais un artiste n'aura plus adoré, plus cherché que moi à honorer la musique, nul n'en aura plus souffert; et j'en souffrirai éternellement".) He became obsessed with the composition of his final opera Briséïs, which was inspired by a tragedy of Goethe and has melodic echoes of Wagner; he completed only one act. The Paris première of Gwendoline, finally took place in December 1893. The composer, ailing physically and mentally, sitting in a stage box with his family, enjoyed the music but did not realise he had written it, nor did he understand that the applause was for him.

Chabrier succumbed to general paresis in the last year of his life and died in Paris at the age of 53. Although he had asked to be buried near the tomb of Manet in the Cimetière de Passy, a plot was not available and he was interred in the Cimetière du Montparnasse. His widow and children also suffered from probable infection: she had severe eye problems, becoming almost blind, and, after Chabrier's death, became paraplegic, dying aged 51; the eldest son, Marcel, died at 35 having also displayed related symptoms, and the second son, Charles, died after only five weeks, the youngest, André, also became paraplegic and died also aged 35.

== Works ==
Vincent d'Indy called Chabrier "that great primitive ... a very great artist". In The Oxford Companion to Music (2011), Denis Arnold and Roger Nichols write that Chabrier's lack of a formal musical education at one of the major conservatoires allowed him the freedom to "bypass the normal paths of French music of the 1860s, and to explore a new harmonic idiom and especially a novel way of writing for the piano". Chabrier's musical language introduced several striking features. Among them, Huebner singles out a liking for melodies of wide range with large leaps from one note to the next; frequent doubling of melodies by the bass or in octaves; a mixture of orthodox and unorthodox chromatic decoration; and frequent use of cross-rhythms and syncopation. Chabrier is reported to have said, "My music rings with the stamp of my Auvergnat clogs", and the pianist and scholar Roy Howat points to examples of this in fast stamping rhythms in the Bourrée fantasque, the Joyeuse marche and several of the Pièces pittoresques.

=== Orchestral ===
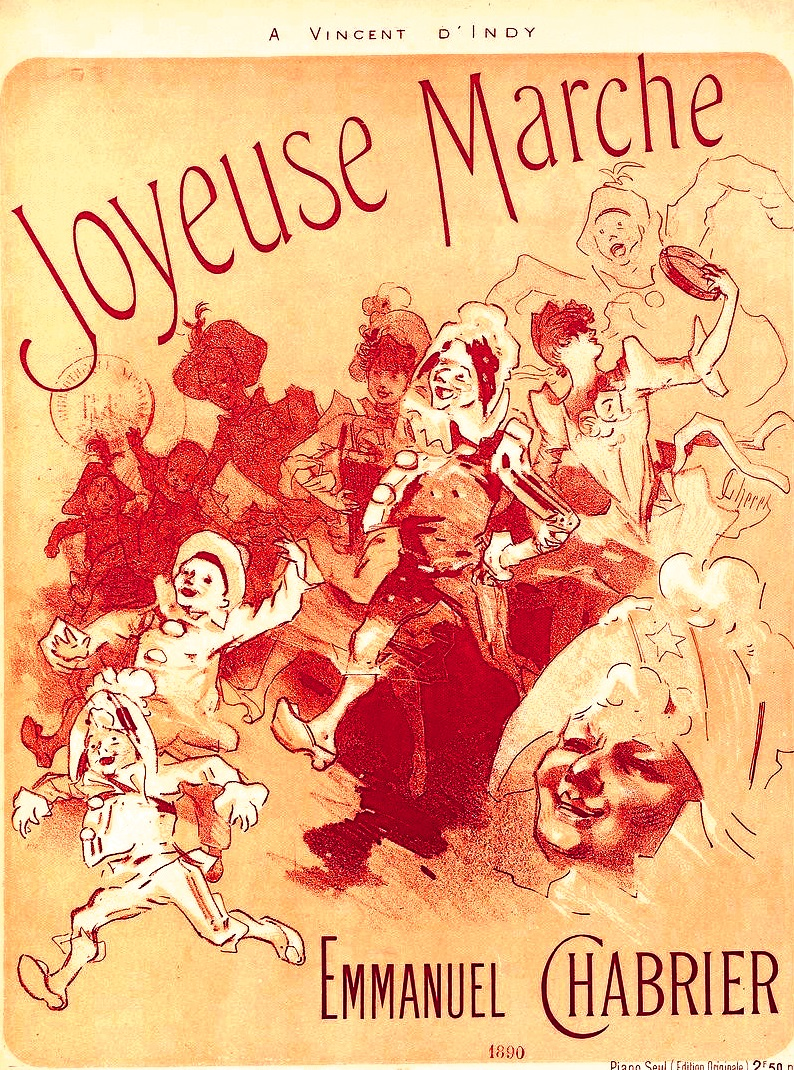
1890 edition of Joyeuse marche

Duparc and Ravel both had reservations about Chabrier's skills as an orchestrator in his early works; Poulenc disagreed, feeling that Chabrier was a master of orchestration from an early stage. Poulenc wrote, "The fact that Chabrier always composed at the piano – as did Debussy and Stravinsky – did not prevent him from finding a rare orchestral colour: a unique achievement at a time when Franck, d'Indy and Saint-Saëns hardly ever emerged from well-worn paths".

The work for which Chabrier is best known is his rhapsody España, which became popular internationally (except in Spain, where it was not a success). (Note: Isaac Albeniz disliked the piece, and Spanish audiences found it unintelligible.) The rhythmic verve of España is found also in the Joyeuse marche, which goes further in orchestral invention. Not all of Chabrier's orchestral pieces are in this exuberant vein: his Lamento (1874), unpublished in his lifetime, is an unusually poignant work.

A few of Chabrier's piano works were later orchestrated. The composer arranged the four movements of the Suite pastorale from the ten Pièces pittoresques. Chabrier began an orchestration of Bourrée fantasque in 1891 (completed in 1994 by Robin Holloway) but his friend and champion Felix Mottl orchestrated it in 1898, proving popular; he did the same for Trois valses romantiques in 1900, and in 1917–18 Ravel arranged the "Menuet pompeux" from the Pièces pittoresques.

=== Stage works ===
Chabrier's ebullient orchestral works have always been popular with the public and critics, but there is less agreement about his serious stage works, and in particular the influence of the music of Wagner. For some critics, the Wagnerian ethos and French sensibilities are simply incompatible, and consequently much of the music of Gwendoline and Briséïs has been denigrated; others have argued that Chabrier so transformed his influences that the music does not sound especially Wagnerian. Huebner puts the truth somewhere between the two, noting Wagner's influence in the similarities between Gwendoline and The Flying Dutchman and Tristan and Isolde, but noting Chabrier's "un-Wagnerian concision", the retention of conventional self-contained numbers, and Chabrier's recognisable melodic and instrumental characteristics. He suggests that preoccupation with supposed derivativeness has deprived the repertory of works such as Gwendoline "with substantial musical and dramatic interest". (Note: Huebner applies this comment to d'Indy's Fervaal and Chausson's Le roi Arthus as well to Gwendoline.)

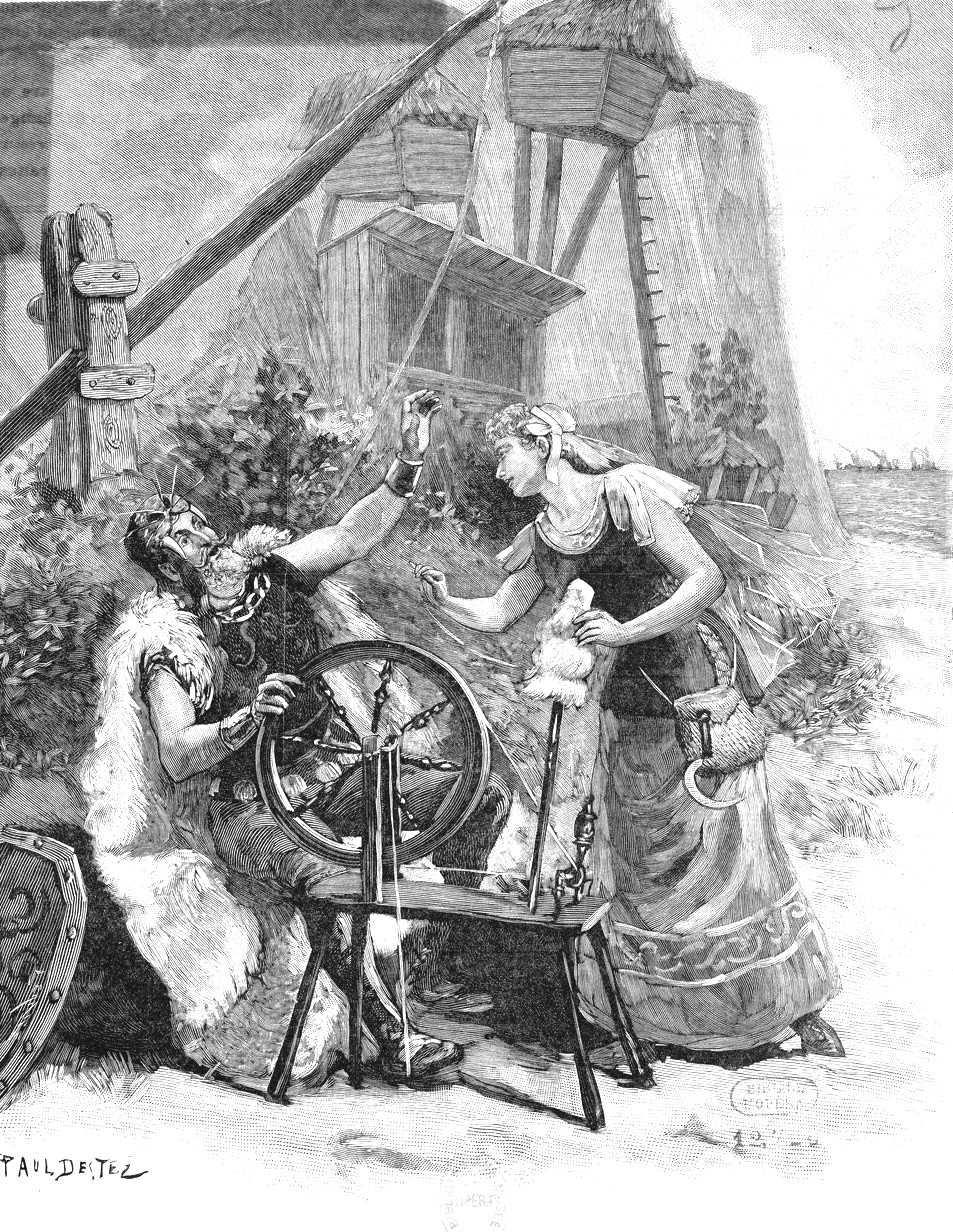
Scene from first Paris production of Gwendoline, 1893

L'etoile, an opéra bouffe in three acts (1877) was Chabrier's first modestly successful opera, and is the most often revived. Although the plot was described by a reviewer in 2016 as "wilfully unfathomable and illogical", the libretto was professional and polished, in contrast with other libretti set by Chabrier. The critic Elizabeth Forbes calls the score, "light as thistle-down … in the best tradition of Offenbachian opéra bouffe, with each singer perfectly characterized in his or her music".

Une éducation manquée (An Incomplete Education), a one-act opérette about a young couple seeking essential advice on their wedding night, received a single private performance in 1879, and was not performed in public until 1913. Forbes wrote in 1992, "Why this charming little work had to wait so many years for a public performance remains a total mystery. The subject is treated with the greatest delicacy… Musically, the piece is quite enchanting, in particular the central duet for the two high voices, while the bass has a fine comic number."

Chabrier's only completed serious opera was Gwendoline, composed between 1879 and 1885 and premiered in 1886. Mendès's libretto was a liability: Henri Büsser commented that it lacked the verve and movement the composer needed; (Note: "Dans Gwendoline, le livret conventionnel de Catulle Mendès, quoique fort inspiré de la forme wagnérienne, n'a pas fourni au musicien ce qui lui était propre : la verve et le mouvement.") Poulenc was dismissive of "Mendès' ineptitudes … balderdash"; and another critic wrote in 1996, "Mendes's dramaturgy is not only painfully thin but takes a long time to get under way". Arnold and Nichols comment that the work is considerably less Wagnerian than has often been supposed: "certainly the modal, asymmetrical, loosely articulated theme of the overture is individual to a degree". The music satisfied neither the pro- nor anti-Wagner lobby: Chabrier commented, "The wagnérien calls me a reactionary and the bourgeois considers me a wagnérien". The opera has been revived from time to time, but has not gained a regular place in the international repertory.

Arnold and Nichols write that some of Chabrier's best music went into his comic opera Le Roi malgré lui (Opéra-Comique, 1887), "but unfortunately the work is saddled with one of the most complex and incomprehensible librettos of all time". Ravel so loved the piece that he said he would rather have written it than Wagner's Ring cycle; reviewing a rare revival in 2003 the critic Edward Greenfield commented that despite the plot, the music made one see Ravel's point. After the same production, the critic Rupert Christiansen wrote, "Le Roi malgre lui doesn't know whether it's a Carry On farce by Offenbach or a nationalist epic by Wagner. Perhaps "grand operetta" is the best way of describing this problem piece".

Chabrier's last opera was Briséïs, to another libretto by Mendès. Mortally ill, Chabrier could only complete the first of the projected three acts, and the remaining sketches were too inconclusive for any of his colleagues to attempt a completion. It was to have been a romantic tragedy, set in Corinth during time of the Roman Empire. The existing act is rarely staged, but a recording of a concert performance in 1994 has been issued on CD. Poulenc was unimpressed by the libretto, but Messager thought the music of Briséïs showed what heights Chabrier might have reached had he lived.

=== Piano ===
Although the piano works are not the best known part of Chabrier's oeuvre, Poulenc put the cycle Pièces pittoresques on a par with Debussy's Preludes in its importance for French music. (Note: Poulenc wrote of his first experience of the music, "Even today it makes me tremble with emotion to think of the resultant miracle: a whole universe of harmony suddenly opened up before of me, and my music has never forgotten this first kiss".) In his introduction to a 1995 edition of the piano works, Howat writes that it was Chabrier, more than any other composer, who restored to French music "the essential French traits of clarity, emotional vitality, wit and tenderness" when other French composers were under the influence of Wagner or of dry academicism.

Chabrier's early works were for piano solo, and in addition to a small corpus of about twenty completed mature works, some juvenilia have survived. Most of the piano pieces were published in the composer's lifetime, but five completed works and the unfinished Capriccio (1883) were issued posthumously. (Note: Chabrier also made a transcription of Berlioz's Harold en Italie for piano duet, in 1876.)

Some of the mature works are better known in their later orchestral versions, including the Joyeuse marche and the four numbers from the Pièces pittoresques that make up the Suite pastorale. The trip to Spain that inspired España also gave Chabrier the material for a Habanera (1885) which became one of his most popular piano works.

Among Chabrier's works for four hands is Souvenirs de Munich. Although Wagner's Tristan und Isolde had made a deep impression on him, his irreverent nature led him to arrange five themes from the opera into a comic quadrille. Poulenc called it "irresistibly funny … Tristan's principal themes with false noses and added beards." (Note: Souvenirs de Bayreuth, a similarly irreverent dance arrangement of themes from Wagner's Ring Cycle by Fauré and Messager is generally thought to have been composed after Chabrier's piece – Grove's Dictionary of Music and Musicians estimates the date of Chabrier's piece as 1885–1886, and Fauré and Messager's as 1888 – but the original composition dates of both pieces are uncertain.)

Vincent d'Indy wrote, after studying the Trois valses romantiques and playing them with the composer: "I thus worked on these three waltzes con amore, doing my best to perform all the indications marked with the greatest precision... and there are many of them! In rehearsal, which was at Pleyel's, Chabrier stopped me dead in the midst of the first waltz, and, addressing me a look that was both amazed and arch, said: "But my dear boy it's not that at all!..." And, as not quite knowing how to react, I asked for explanations, he retorted: "You play that as if it were music by a Member of the Institute!..." And then I had a marvellous lesson in playing alla Chabrier; contrary accents, pianissimi to the point of extinction, sudden fire-crackers bursting out in the middle of the most exquisite softness, and also indispensable gesturing, giving over the body, too, to the intention of the music".

Chabrier was an important influence on Debussy, as he was later on Ravel and Poulenc; Howat has written that Chabrier's piano music such as "Sous-bois" and "Mauresque" in the Pièces pittoresques explored new sound-worlds of which Debussy made effective use 30 years later.

=== Songs ===
There are forty-three published songs by Chabrier. He began writing songs – mélodies – when he was about twenty-one; the first nine were written between 1862 and 1866. Johnson comments that it is strange that in all his songs Chabrier never set anything by his friend Verlaine, but among the well-known poets whose verse Chabrier set in the early songs were Théodore de Banville ("Lied") and Alfred de Musset ("Adieux à Suzon").

In 1888 Chabrier made sixteen arrangements of French folk songs for an anthology called Le plus jolies chansons du pays de France. He was among the first important composers to work with folk songs, a pioneer for Ravel, Bartók, Britten and others. Johnson writes that Chabrier's touch in these pieces is "deceptively light and restrained", but that the piano writing continually adds enormously to the charm of the music. A later group of songs (1889) with a linking theme is what Chabrier called his "poultry farm", to lyrics by Edmond Rostand and Rosemonde Gérard, with subjects including fat turkeys, little ducklings, pink pigs and chirping cicadas.

Most of the songs are for solo voice and piano, but there is one duet (the comic "Duo de l'ouvresse de l'Opéra-Comique", 1888) and in Chabrier's setting of Baudelaire's "L'invitation au voyage" (1870), the voice and piano are joined by a solo bassoon. Chabrier's last song, "Ode à la Musique", to words by Rostand, is for solo soprano, piano and female choir.

== Influence ==
The musicologist David Charlton evaluated his influence by saying "While the musical language of Reyer, Massenet and Saint-Saens presented syntheses of current practice, that of Emmanuel Chabrier (1841–1894) was a catalyst: his work became the cradle of French modernism".

Ah! Chabrier, I love him as one loves a father! An indulgent father, always merry, his pockets full of tasty tit-bits. Chabrier's music is a treasure-house you could never exhaust. I just could not do without it.

— Francis Poulenc

Debussy, Ravel and Poulenc all acknowledged Chabrier's influence on their music. Debussy wrote in 1893 "Chabrier, Moussorgsky, Palestrina, voilà ce que j'aime" – they are what I love, and said that he could not have written La Damoiselle élue without Chabrier's La sulamite as a model. Huebner remarks on echoes of Chabrier in Debussy's "La soirée dans Grenade" in Estampes, and the piano prelude "Général Lavine – excentric". The influence on Ravel is still more marked. In a 1975 study of the two composers, Delage wrote, "In truth there are few works by Ravel which do not to some extent echo one or another work of Chabrier and of which the harmonic procedures are not derived from him". Ravel paid explicit homage to Chabrier in his A la manière de Chabrier, based on Chabrier's piano piece Mélancolie.

Poulenc said that he had L'étoile in mind while he wrote Les mamelles de Tirésias. Huebner comments that the influence of Chabrier on Poulenc and the other members of Les Six was particularly strong, although the later composers were more often drawn to the humorous, parodic side of Chabrier's oeuvre than to the romantic and serious. Other French composers whose music shows the influence of Chabrier include Charles Lecocq, Messager and Satie.

Composers from other countries who works show the influence of Chabrier include Stravinsky, whose Petrushka has thematic and melodic echoes of Chabrier, and Mahler, who called España "the beginnings of modern music" and alluded to the "Dance Villageoise" in the Rondo Burleske movement of his Ninth Symphony. Richard Strauss, who was an admirer of Chabrier, conducted the first stage performance of the one act of Briséïs, and the critic Gerald Larner comments that Strauss was evidently influenced by the work when he came to compose his Salome eight years later.

Un bar aux Folies Bergère by Édouard Manet, completed in 1882 was among those sold from Chabrier's collection after his death.

== Chabrier and art ==
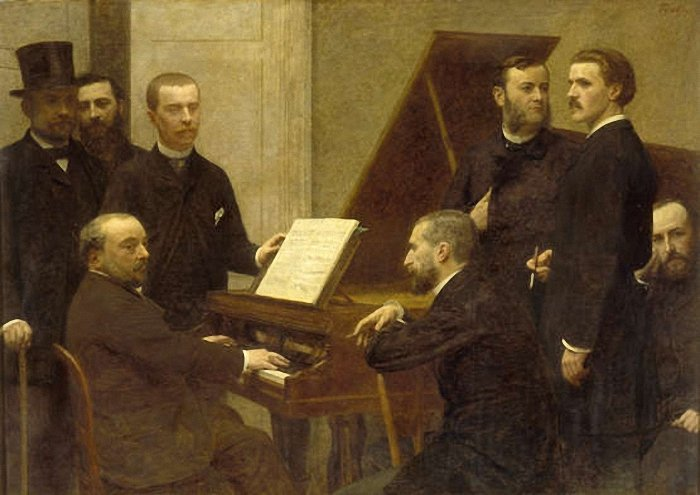
Autour du piano, 1885, by Henri Fantin-Latour; Chabrier at the piano, and Vincent d'Indy standing, furthest right (Note: The other musicians in the picture are Adolphe Julien, Arthur Boisseau, Camille Benoît, Edmond Maître, Antoine Lascoux and Amédée Pigeon.)

Chabrier was known for his continual contacts with contemporary artists, particularly painters of the Impressionist school. He left a rich collection of paintings by contemporary French painters; Edward Lockspeiser felt that "if ever it could be reassembled [the collection] would be rivalled, among collections of other composers, only by that of Chausson, which consisted largely of Delacroix". A sale of his collection at the Hôtel Drouot on 26 March 1896 included works by Cézanne, Manet, Monet, Renoir, and Sisley. (Note: Details of these paintings: Les Moissonneurs by Paul Cézanne; Un bar aux Folies Bergère by Édouard Manet; Le Skating by Manet; Polichinelle by Manet; Les bords de la Seine by Claude Monet; Le parc Monceau by Monet; La fête nationale, rue du Faubourg Saint-Denis by Monet; The Rue Saint-Denis, 30 June 1878 by Monet; Femme nue by Pierre-Auguste Renoir; Canotier à Hampton Court by Alfred Sisley; La Seine au Point du Jour by Sisley.)

Chabrier himself was frequently painted or sketched by his artist friends. Two of these portraits are reproduced above: a drawing of Chabrier at the piano (1887) by Édouard Detaille and Manet's Portrait de Chabrier (oil on canvas, 1881). He is seen at the piano in Autour du piano by Henri Fantin-Latour (right). Other portraits of Chabrier include a crayon drawing by James Tissot (1861); in the stage box in L'orchestre de l'Opéra by Degas (c. 1868); on the right of Bal masqué à l'opéra by Manet (1873), a pastel sketch by Manet (1880), a portrait by Marcellin Desboutin (c. 1881) and a bust (1886) by Constantin Meunier.

Johnson comments that although it now seems extraordinary that the owner of such magnificent works of art should have money worries, this was before Impressionist paintings became sought-after and expensive, and "in any case, this was a composer who regarded his collection as a spiritual necessity rather than a financial asset". Chabrier was also a collector of avant-garde writing; as well as Verlaine, among others he sought out the works of Régnier, Willette and Gill.

== Notes, references and sources ==
=== Sources ===
==== Books ====
- Chabrier, Emmanuel (1994). Correspondance. Ed Delage R, Durif F. Klincksieck. ISBN 978-2-252-02966-4. (Format = Year - Letter number - Note number)
- Delage, Roger (1982). Chabrier, iconographie musicale. Geneva: Minkoff & Lattès. ISBN 978-2-8266-0638-3.
- Delage, Roger (1999). Emmanuel Chabrier (in French). Paris: Fayard. ISBN 978-2-213-60508-1.
- Desaymard, Joseph (1934). Emmanuel Chabrier d'après ses lettres (in French). Paris: Fernand Roches. OCLC 217973854.
- Howat, Roy (1995). "Introduction". Works for Piano: Emmanuel Chabrier. New York: Dover. ISBN 978-0-486-28574-0.
- Huebner, Steven (2006). French Opera at the Fin de Siècle. New York: Oxford University Press. ISBN 978-0-19-518954-4.
- Johnson, Graham (2011). Gabriel Fauré. Farnham and Burlington: Ashgate. ISBN 978-0-7546-5960-0.
- Myers, Rollo (1969). Emmanuel Chabrier and His Circle. London: J. M. Dent & Sons. OCLC 468885958.
- Nichols, Roger (1987). Ravel Remembered. London: Faber and Faber. ISBN 978-0-571-14986-5.
- Poulenc, Francis (1981) [1961]. Emmanuel Chabrier. trans. Cynthia Jolly. London: Dobson. ISBN 978-0-234-77252-2.
- Poulenc, Francis (1978). Audel, Stéphane (ed.). My Friends and Myself. Translated by Harding, James. London: Dennis Dobson. ISBN 978-0-234-77251-5.
- Stove, R. J. (2012). César Franck: His Life and Times. Lanham: Scarecrow Press. ISBN 978-0-8108-8207-2.

==== Journals ====
- Delage, Roger (January 1963). "Emmanuel Chabrier in Germany". The Musical Quarterly. 49 (1): 75–84. doi:10.1093/mq/xlix.1.75. JSTOR 740499. (subscription required)
- Delage, Roger (October 1975). "Ravel and Chabrier". The Musical Quarterly. 61 (4): 546–552. doi:10.1093/mq/lxi.4.546. JSTOR 741394. (subscription required)
- Prod'homme, Jacques-Gabriel (October 1935). "Chabrier in His Letters". The Musical Quarterly. 21 (4): 451–465. doi:10.1093/mq/xxi.4.451. JSTOR 738665. (subscription required)
