= Bourrée fantasque =

Piece of music for solo piano by Emmanuel Chabrier

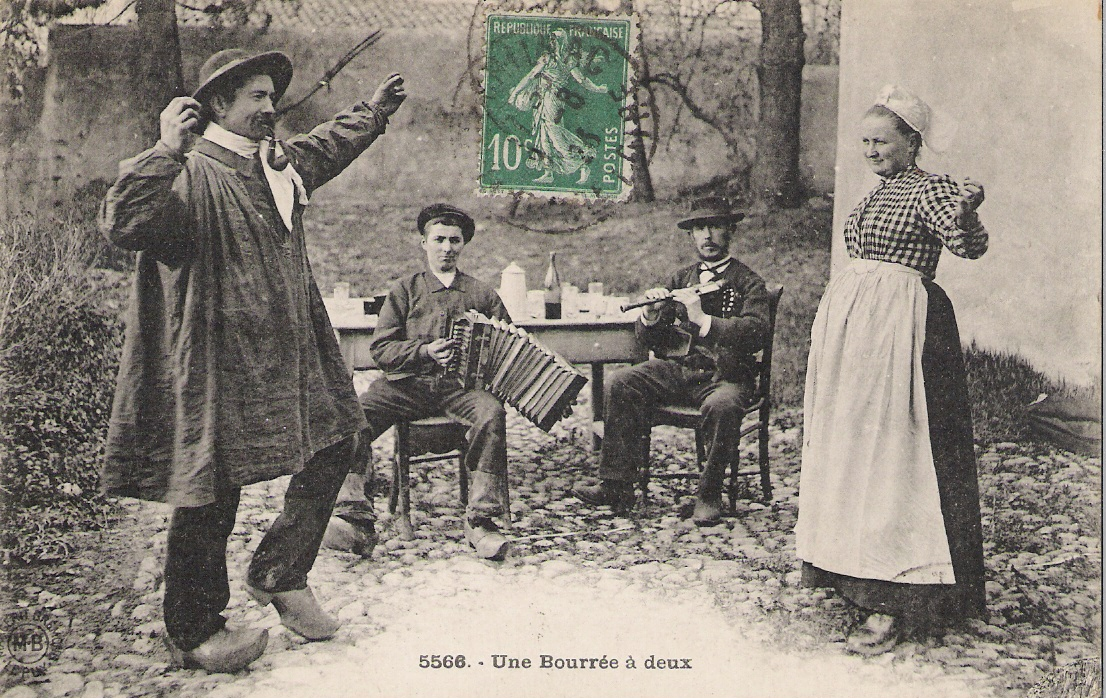
Bourrée in Auvergne, early 20th century

"Bourrée fantasque" is a piece of music for solo piano by Emmanuel Chabrier (1841–1894), being one of his last major completed works.

== Background ==
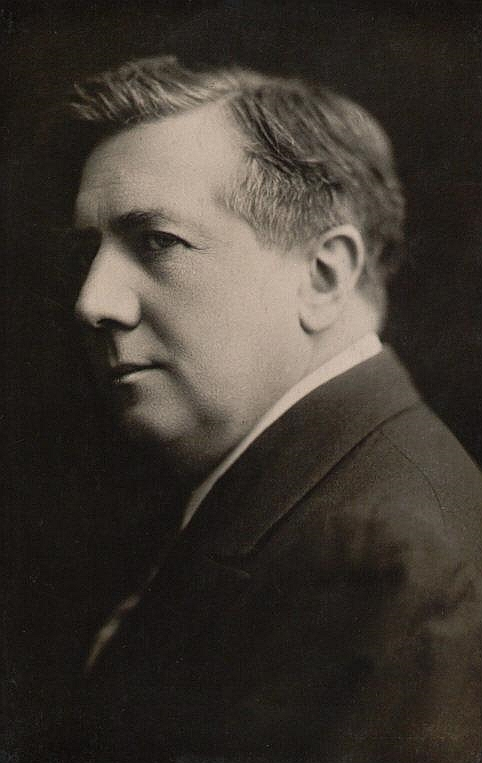
Risler, dedicatee of Bourrée fantasque

"Bourrée fantasque" is dedicated to the pianist Édouard Risler (1873–1929), who in fact did not play the work in public until after the composer's death. The first public performance was given by Madeleine Jaeger (Mme Henry Jossic, 1868–1905) on 7 January 1893 at the Société Nationale de Musique in Paris.

It was composed around April 1891, following a visit to his native Auvergne the previous summer, when Chabrier's health was deteriorating. According to Alfred Cortot it is "one of the most exciting and original works in the whole literature of French piano music". Unlike much nineteenth century writing for the pianoforte, the instrument is treated almost like an orchestra, and "foreshadows innovations in pianistic technique introduced by Ravel in Gaspard de la nuit and Debussy in the late Études". The manuscript is at the Bibliothèque nationale de France.

== The music ==
In a letter to Risler dated 12 May 1891, Chabrier wrote, "I have made you a little piano piece which I think is quite amusing and in which I have counted about 113 different sonorities. Let us see how you will make this one shine! It should be bright and crazy!" The precision of the notation in each bar, dynamics from ppp to tutta forza, accents, pedal indications, bear witness to his wish to obtain an exceptional tonal variety and richness. The piece lasts six to seven minutes.

In 2/4 time, the piece opens with the repeated notes of the main theme (Très animé et avec beaucoup d'entrain) hammered out in the middle register of the piano, and put through its paces. The middle section changes mood with a freely-modulating caressing melody (molto espressivo) before the original theme returns pp, worked in combination with the second theme, until the main bourrée theme "rampages from top to bottom of the keyboard subjected to increasing elaboration and bravura treatment".

In relation to the "Bourrée fantasque" Charles Koechlin affirmed that Chabrier was the forerunner of modern French composers through the boldness of his writing technique, use of certain chord progressions, and use of modal atmosphere and ancient modes – which is never artificial or imitative, but a natural means of poetic expression.

== Orchestrations ==
Chabrier's unfinished orchestration consists of 16 pages of score, or about one third of the work, with all tempi and indications for performance carefully marked.

- 1898 by Felix Mottl (for large orchestra), first performance 27 March 1898, Orchestre Lamoureux, Felix Mottl.
- 1924 by Charles Koechlin, first performance 25 January 1925, Paris Conservatoire Orchestra, Philippe Gaubert.
- 1994 by Robin Holloway (completion of Chabrier's unfinished orchestration), first performance 8 February 1994, Queen Elizabeth Hall, London, English Northern Philharmonia, Paul Daniel.

In addition John Iveson made an arrangement for ten brass instruments, which was recorded by the Philip Jones Brass Ensemble in 1983.

== Ballet ==
Jean-Jacques Etchevery created a ballet of the same title using Chabrier's music for the Opéra-Comique in 1946.

George Balanchine also created a ballet based on the piece and three others by Chabrier for New York City Ballet in 1949.
