= Pièces pittoresques =

Set of ten pieces for piano by Emmanuel Chabrier

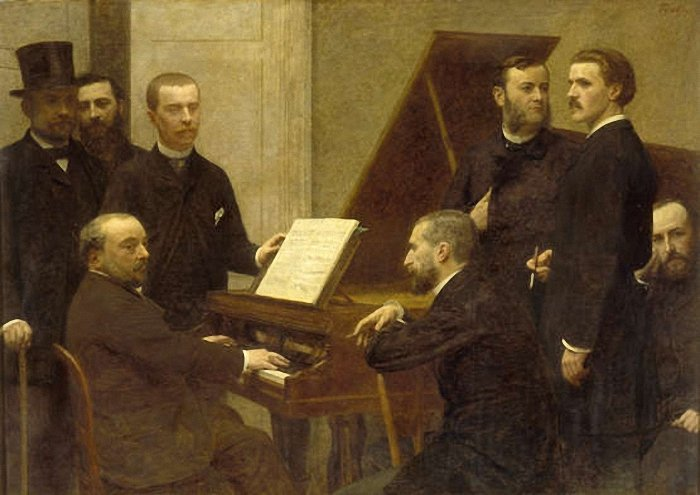
Autour du piano, oil on canvas 1885 by Henri Fantin-Latour; Chabrier at the piano, Adolphe Julien, Arthur Boisseau, Camille Benoît, Edmond Maître, Antoine Lascoux, Vincent d'Indy and Amédée Pigeon grouped around.

Pièces pittoresques (Picturesque pieces) are a set of ten pieces for piano by Emmanuel Chabrier. Four of the set were later orchestrated by the composer to make his Suite pastorale.

== Background ==
In 1880, while on a convalescent holiday at the coastal resort of Saint-Pair (near Granville), Chabrier composed what were to be called Pièces pittoresques. Both Alfred Cortot (in La musique française de piano, PUF, 1932) and Francis Poulenc (Emmanuel Chabrier, 1961) discuss these short works enthusiastically. César Franck, at their premiere in 1881, remarked that those present had "just heard something exceptional. This music links our own time to that of Couperin and Rameau".

The manuscript in the archive of Litolff publishers was destroyed by an air-raid on Brunswick in 1942.

The first performances of individual pieces took place on different dates: 9 April 1881 for Sous-bois, Idylle, Danse villageoise, Improvisation, Menuet pompeux, Scherzo-valse (Marie Poitevin); Mélancolie on 24 December 1887 (Marie-Léontine Bordes-Pène); others unknown.

Several of the movements were incorporated by Constant Lambert in the 1934 ballet Bar aux Folies-Bergère.

== Pieces ==
=== 1. Paysage (Landscape) ===
D♭ major, 2/4; Allegro non troppo – vivo (dedicated to La comtesse de Narbonne-Lara)
For Poulenc, Paysage portrayed a landscape where life was to be enjoyed. The middle section is a voluble depiction of agitation calmed by the return of the main theme.

Paysage opens the cycle with a straight perfect cadence to the tonic D-flat, downgrading what textbooks would tell us should be reserved for a more conclusive moment. Paysage is riddled with rhythmic and harmonic games, not least the absence throughout of a single clear four-bar phrase; the piece's opening section, all in three-bar phrases, makes two teasing feints at four-bar phrases, both thwarted. Poulenc suggests that the piece should be played with "allegresse et tendresse".

=== 2. Mélancolie (Melancholy) ===
G major, 9/8 & 6/8; Ben moderato senza rigore et sempre tempo rubato (dedicated to Marie Pillon)
About Mélancolie, Cortot was moved to write that its 'nostalgic charm and discreet perfection' defied analysis. Ravel saw the soul of Manet's Olympia in Mélancolie. The alternating 9/8 and 6/8 bars create an atmosphere of wandering tenderness and uncertainty; the piece closes with a canon at the double octave then in lows fifths.

Mélancolie is a sophisticated blend of textural inversion, canon and rhythmic compression that essentially determines the piece's outer envelope. Poulenc suggests that the piece should be played with "allegresse et tendresse".

=== 3. Tourbillon (Whirlwind) ===
D major, 3/4; Allegro con fuoco (dedicated to Marie Meurice)
At first echoing the animated rhythms of Berlioz's Béatrice et Bénédict, it evolves into a more complex beat, avoiding the bar-line. Its almost aggressive force is perhaps a reminder of the possibilities of Chabrier's own playing. The final bars juxtapose a Mendelssohnian passage with one ironically in the manner of Offenbach.

=== 4. Sous-bois (Under the trees) ===
C major, 2/4; Andantino (dedicated to Marie de la Guèronnière)
Economy of means, a sense of movement even in immobility and constantly changing harmonies (from C major to remote and unlikely tonalities) in the right-hand and the weaving bass over which a broken melody.

Poulenc wrote that Ravel had often spoken to him of this piece with enthusiasm, considering it one of the great moments in Chabrier's output.

=== 5. Mauresque (Moorish) ===
A minor, 3/4; Moderato (dedicated to Madame Charles Phalen)
Written before Chabrier's visit to Spain but colourful and with modal touches, muted effects and plucked notes – a precursor of Debussy's Soirée dans Grenade. Poulenc compared it to the Forlane from Ravel's Le tombeau de Couperin.

=== 6. Idylle (Idyll) ===
E major, 4/4; Allegretto (dedicated to Jeanne Monvoisin)
'Allegretto avec fraîcheur et naïveté' albeit with some artfulness – a song ('bien chantée'), accompanied by a pizzicato effect 'un sentiment assez campagnard'. Poulenc wrote that when he heard this piece for the first time in February 1914 he was overwhelmed: "un univers harmonique s'ouvrait soudain devant moi et ma musique n'a jamais oublie ce premier baiser d'amour". He added that the piece should be played at the metronome marking, without rubato.

=== 7. Danse villageoise (Village dance) ===
A minor, 2/4; Allegro risoluto (dedicated to Yvonne de Montesquieu)
Danse villageoise, in a more traditional ternary form, provides a slightly heavy-footed contrast and illustrates the rustic spirit of Chabrier yet with precise polyphony (with some elements of Beethoven's Piano Sonata No. 25). The decisive scherzo is in A minor while the hesitating trio in the major.

=== 8. Improvisation ===
B♭ major, 6/8, 2/4; Andantino – Appassionato e con impeto – molto con impeto – moderato (dedicated to Marguerite Gagne)
'Fantasque et passionnée' with the greatest variety of rhythms, the hints of methods which become common in Debussy (e.g. four dotted quavers in a bar of 6/8): the bars become at times 3/4 or 2/4. Although entitled an improvisation, it is in fact in a strict sonata form.

=== 9. Menuet pompeux (Pompous minuet) ===
G minor, 3/4; Allegro franco – meno mosso e molto dolce e grazioso (dedicated to Gabrielle Petitdemange)
Menuet pompeux, despite some arresting harmonies, shows Chabrier looking backward rather than forward. If the minuet is more like an Auvergnat dance, the G major trio is a nod to the 18th century. Ravel would orchestrate this movement, which would premier in 1918.

=== 10. Scherzo-valse ===
D major, 9/16, 3/8; Vivo (dedicated to Mina de Gabriac)
A spirited conclusion to the set, although again the trio allows a respite from the energy of the infectious joie de vivre of the main section. Poulenc criticised those who take this piece faster than dotted crotchet = 192 (as Ricardo Viñes played it).

The titles appear not to be Chabrier's own, but were provided by his publishers.

== Suite pastorale ==
Between 1881 and 1888 Chabrier orchestrated Idylle, Danse villageoise, Sous-bois and Scherzo-valse to form the Suite pastorale. The suite was first performed on 4 November 1888 by the Association artistique d'Angers, conducted by Chabrier himself.

The instrumentation is 2 flutes (one doubling piccolo), 1 oboe, 2 clarinets in B♭ and A, 2 bassoons - 2 horns in F and E, 2 cornets à pistons in C, 3 trombones (Scherzo-Valse only) - timpani, bass drum, triangle - harp, strings.
