= Une éducation manquée =

Opérette in one act and nine scenes by Emmanuel Chabrier

- opérette by Emmanuel Chabrier
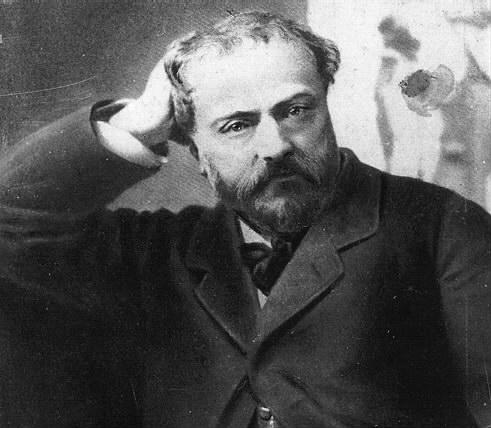
- Librettist: Eugène Leterrier; Albert Vanloo
- Language: French
- Premiere: 1 May 1879

Une éducation manquée (French pronunciation: [yn edykasjɔ̃ mɑ̃ke], An Incomplete Education) is an opérette in one act and nine scenes by Emmanuel Chabrier. The French libretto is by Eugène Leterrier and Albert Vanloo. Composed in 1878–79, the work, which is set in the 18th century, is in a lively, light operetta style in which Chabrier excelled and had perfected in L’étoile a year or so earlier. It was much admired by Ravel, Hahn and Messager, among others. One director drew parallels with earlier French opéras-comique by such as Favart; set in the eighteenth century, Chabrier's characters of a young count, his new very young wife and former tutor are "sophisticated equivalents of the characters in Favart's [Les Amours de] Bastien et Bastienne or Rousseau's Le Devin du Village.

== Performance history ==
The ‘opérette’ was first performed on 1 May 1879 as part of an evening's entertainment organized by the ‘Cercle international’ in the Boulevard des Capucines, with piano accompaniment by Chabrier himself. There is evidence that the Vitale Italian Operetta Company (Italy) prepared the work around 1904, and gave the first Buenos Aires performance at the Teatro Politeama on 12 September 1904 (as Tuono provvidenziale) and again in 1905. The work was revived in March 1910 in Monte Carlo and on 9 January 1911 at the Théâtre des Arts conducted by Gabriel Grovlez. In December 1918 Jane Bathori mounted the piece at the Théâtre du Vieux-Colombier. The 1924 Paris production by Diaghilev, designed by Juan Gris and conducted by André Messager, had recitatives by Darius Milhaud to replace the spoken dialogue. Milhaud also composed an aria for Hélène based on a melody he found among Chabrier's unpublished manuscripts, Couplets de Mariette.

The first performance at the Paris Opéra-Comique, conducted by Roger Désormière, was on 24 March 1938, and it reached its 50th performance there in April 1946. It has occasionally been revived, though sometimes with Gontran transposed for a tenor.

The 1961 St Pancras Arts Festival saw performances (as A Lesson in Love), coupled with The Medium, at St Pancras Town Hall directed by Anthony Besch and conducted by Bernard Jacob.

== Roles ==
The names of the two newly-weds are allusive : bois massif is 'solid wood' and cerisaie is a cherry orchard.

Role	Voice type	Premiere Cast, 1 May 1879 (Piano accompaniment: Chabrier)
Gontran de Boismassif	soprano	Jane Hading
Hélène de la Cerisaie	soprano	Mme Réval
Maître Pausanias	bass	Louis-Auguste Morlet

== Synopsis ==
The overture quotes from “Lorsque le ciel”, the letter song and “Faisons-nous petits”.

=== Act 1 ===
Scene 1 and 2

Arriving directly from their (teenage) wedding, the young Count Gontran and his wife Hélène, are both expecting some adult advice from their relations. Their annoyance is interrupted by the arrival of Pausanias, Gontran's tutor. Slightly tipsy, Pausanias explains in song “Ce vin généreux” that the Vin de Roussillon was to blame – he had ended by drinking twelve glasses. Then Pausanias explains although Hélène's aunt is ready to see her, as Gontran's grandfather is ill he can't come to talk to the young man, but has sent a letter instead.

Scene 3

Alone, Gontran reads the letter (in song) which ends by saying that there is nothing Gontran's grandfather can teach him... Gontran hastily pens a letter to Pausanias, asking him to return and give him wedding-night advice.

Scene 4

Hélène enters, and it turns out that her aunt's advice was simply to be kind and obedient to her husband. In a duet “Eh bien, ma chère” they exchange a kiss but realize that there must be something more to being husband and wife...

Scene 5 and 6

Alone again, Gontran gets more irritated, as Pausanias arrives back, hinting that he might be interrupting something. But Gontran complains that Pausanias was engaged to teach him all that a man should know about life. In a buffo duo “Après vous avoir saturé d’hébreu”, Pausanias rejects this, insisting that he has taught Gontran Hebrew, Hindu, algebra, chemistry, Greek, trigonometry, metaphysics, therapeutics, mechanics, dialectics, aesthetics, statistics, mythology, metallurgy, ...and so on. Gontran rebuts "no, a thousand times, that’s not enough!" Finally, Pausanias admits that he doesn't know – he is too busy, and it wasn't on the curriculum. But he promises to find out and return immediately.

Scene 7 and 8

Gontran curses his tutor, but, as a storm gathers, confesses his frustrated feelings in “Lorsque le ciel”; as thunder sounds Hélène rushes into the room her nightdress undone, and explains that she is really frightened of thunder. Gontran is struck by how attractive she looks and tells her the best way to remain calm in a storm is to come closer and hold hands. As their duo “Faisons-nous petits” takes flight they get closer still and kiss more and more – and find the answer to their question.

Scene 9

But they are interrupted as Pausanias returns. Gontran orders him out – asking the indulgence of the audience. After a quick reprise of the previous duo the curtain falls.

== Recordings ==
- Christiane Castelli, Claudine Collart and Xavier Depraz, with orchestra conducted by Charles Bruck (1953).
- Liliane Berton, Jane Berbié and Jean-Christophe Benoît, Orchestre de la société des Concerts du Conservatiore, conducted by Jean-Claude Hartemann (EMI, 1965).
