= Gwendoline (opera) =

1886 opera by Emmanuel Chabrier

- Opera by Emmanuel Chabrier
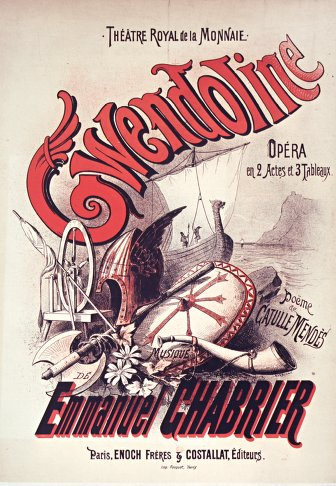
- Poster from the opera Gwendoline, 1886 (premiere)
- Librettist: Catulle Mendès
- Language: French
- Premiere: 10 April 1886; Théâtre de la Monnaie, Brussels

Gwendoline is an opera in two acts and three scenes by the French composer Emmanuel Chabrier, with a libretto by Catulle Mendès. It was first performed at the Théâtre de la Monnaie, Brussels, Belgium, on 10 April 1886. Further performances followed in Karlsruhe in 1889, Leipzig in 1890 and then in Lyons and Paris in 1893. Gwendoline was Chabrier's attempt to write a serious opera in the style of Richard Wagner.

Though the complete opera has become something of a rarity, the Overture has had a performance life of its own, including classic recordings, and furnishes part of the score to George Balanchine's ballet Bourrée Fantasque.

== Roles ==
Roles, voice types, premiere cast
Role	Voice type	Premiere cast, 10 April 1886 Conductor: Joseph Dupont
Gwendoline	soprano	Élisa-Eugénie Thuringer
Armel	tenor	Pierre-Émile Engel
Erick	tenor	Franklin
Aella	baritone	Gustave Seuille
Harald	baritone	Charles Bérardi
A Dane	bass	

== Synopsis ==
Place: The Coast of Britain
Time: The eighth century

=== Act 1 ===
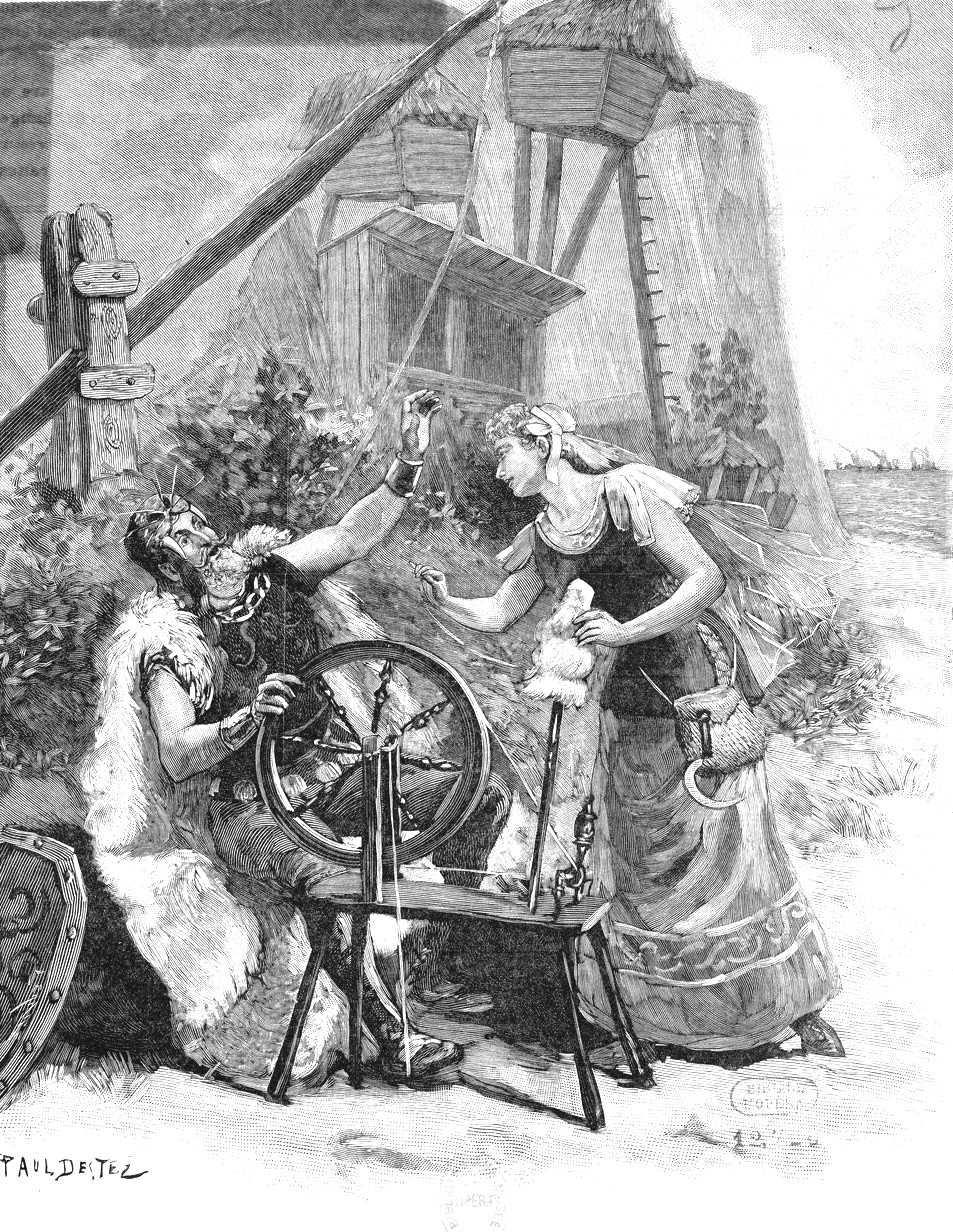
Scene from first Paris production of Gwendoline, 1893

The Saxon village, situated in a valley, not far from the sea

Saxon villagers prepare for the day's work. Gwendoline warns her father, the Saxon chief Armel, about the menace of Danish pirates. After the menfolk leave, Gwendoline recounts her vision of being carried off by a Danish raider. Suddenly the Saxon men return, victims of a surprise Danish raid, led by Harald. He orders Armel to reveal the location of his hoard, and when Armel refuses, Harald prepares to execute him. Gwendoline begs him to spare her father; spellbound by her, Harald commands everyone to leave. Gwendoline sings a spinning song and succeeds in getting him to spin. Harald asks Armel to give his daughter in marriage – to which the Saxon elder consents while assuring his compatriots that revenge will come following the wedding feast. The two lovers take up the spinning song again as the act closes.

=== Act 2 ===
The coarsely decorated nuptial chamber

A choral wedding procession is heard, while Armel plots with Aella and Erick to take the Danes' weapons and burn their ships. Gwendoline and Harald enter and Armel blesses their union. But Armel slips a dagger to Gwendoline for her to kill Harald that evening. Alone with Harald, Gwendoline urges him to flee, without revealing her father's intentions. They sing of their love but are interrupted by shouts of pirates being killed. Harald leaves to join his companions; Gwendoline gives him the dagger, swearing to join him in death.

A rocky ravine by the sea, Danish vessels in the background

As the Danes are being slaughtered, Harald staggers on and is trapped against a tree but laughs defiantly. The old man stabs him. Seeing her beloved dying, Gwendoline seizes the dagger and stabs herself to death. The two lovers stand together embracing as a ray of light illuminates them, with the Danish ships alight in a ball of fire.

== Recordings ==
- Gwendoline Adriana Kohútková, Didier Henry, Gérard Garino, Brno Czech National Philharmonic Male Choir, Slovak National Philharmonic Choir, Slovak National Philharmonic Orchestra, conducted by Jean-Paul Penin (L'Empreinte Digitale, 1999)
