= Charles Lamoureux =

French conductor and violinist (1834–1899)

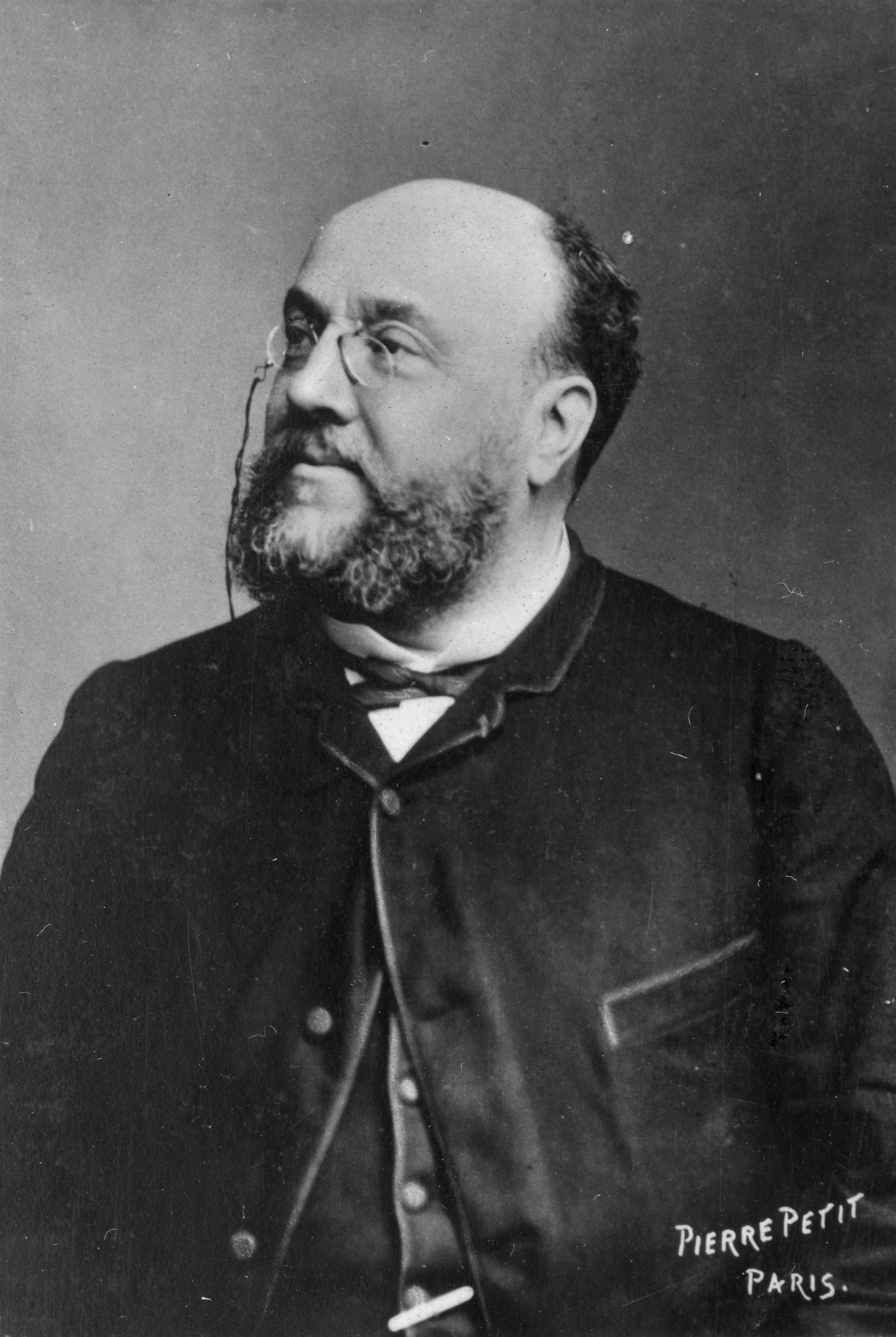
- Born: 28 September 1834; Bordeaux
- Died: 21 December 1899 (aged 65); Paris
- Education: Paris Conservatoire
- Occupation: Conductor
- Known for: Société Française de l'Harmonie Sacrée

Charles Lamoureux (pronounced [ʃaʁl la.mu.ʁø]; 28 September 1834 – 21 December 1899) was a French conductor and violinist.

== Life ==
He was born in Bordeaux, where his father owned a café. He studied the violin with Narcisse Girard at the Paris Conservatoire, taking a premier prix in 1854. He was subsequently engaged as a violinist at the Opéra de Paris and later joined the Société des Concerts du Conservatoire. In 1860, he was a co-founder of the Séances Populaires de Musique de Chambre and in 1872 he founded a quartet which eventually took on the proportions of a chamber orchestra.

Having journeyed to England and assisted at a Handel festival, he thought he would attempt something similar in Paris. Having come into a fortune through marriage, he put on the performances himself, leading to the foundation of the Société Française de l'Harmonie Sacrée. In 1873, Lamoureux conducted the first performance in Paris of Handel's Messiah. He also gave performances of Bach's St Matthew Passion, Handel's Judas Maccabaeus, Gounod's Gallia, and Massenet's Eve. As funds ran out, Lamoureux took up posts at the Opéra-Comique (1876) and the Paris Opéra (1877–1879) which were short-lived, due to Lamoureux's tendency to quarrel over their productions.

Lamoureux then drew up a contract with the Théâtre du Château d'Eau to give weekly symphony concerts. The Société des Nouveaux-Concerts (which became known as the Concerts Lamoureux) was directed by Lamoureux from 1881 until 1897, when he was succeeded by Camille Chevillard, his son-in-law. These concerts contributed greatly to popularizing Wagner's music in Paris.

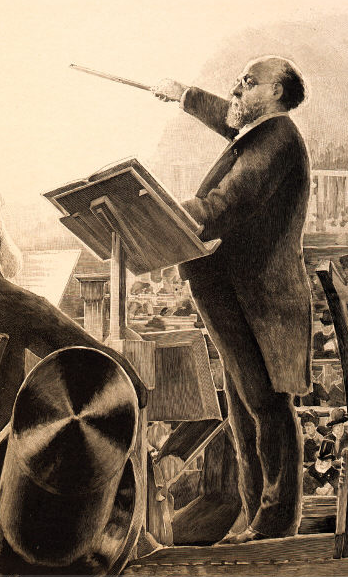
Charles Lamoureux conducting from the podium.

In fact Lamoureux's advocacy of Wagner's music was untiring. When he gave the first French performance of Wagner's Lohengrin at the Eden-Théâtre in 1887, the Chauvinists held street demonstrations outside denouncing the performance as an unpatriotic act. Despite this setback, two years later the work was restaged at the Opéra. Lamoureux was successively second chef d'orchestre at the Conservatoire, first chef d'orchestre at the Opéra-Comique, and twice first chef d'orchestre at the Opéra.

In 1893 Lamoureux made a tour of Russia. He visited London on several occasions, and gave successful concerts with his orchestra at the Queen's Hall, on one occasion sharing the stage with Sir Henry Wood and Wood's own orchestra. Lamoureux died at Paris in December 1899; Tristan und Isolde had been at last heard in Paris, owing to his initiative and under his direction. After conducting one of the performances of this masterpiece he was taken ill and succumbed in a few days, having had the consolation before his death of witnessing the triumph of the cause he had so courageously championed.

== See also ==
- Berthe Marx

Cultural offices
Preceded by none	Principal Conductors, Lamoureux Orchestra; 1881–1897	Succeeded by Camille Chevillard
