= Billy Eidi =

French classical pianist (born 1955)

Billy Eidi (born 17 May 1955) is a French classical pianist of Lebanese ancestry.

== Early life ==
He was born in Egypt and completed his first musical studies at the Beirut Conservatory under Zafer Dabaghi and Leila Aouad, where he graduated at age 15.

He took advanced training courses with Hans Leygraf in Salzbourg and Guido Agosti in Siena. He moved to Paris to work with Jacques Coulaud at the Conservatoire de Versailles where he won first prize and an honorary prize. He then studied under Jean Micault at the École normale de musique de Paris. He graduated for concert in 1979, first nominated.

== Career ==
In 1981, he won second prize in the International Viotti-Valsesia Competition.

He is a laureate of the Menuhin foundation, as well as of the Francis Poulenc International Competition where he won a prize for melody with baritone Jean-François Gardeil.

He gave concerts throughout the world (France, England, Italy, Switzerland, Belgium, Spain, Germany, Luxembourg, Czech Republic, Greece, Bulgaria, Ukraine, Sweden, United States, Japan, South Korea and the Middle East). He features the romantic repertoire and the French music of the twentieth century, striving to discover unknown authors and repertoires.

Eidi performed pieces by Erik Satie (Sixième Nocturne), Henri Sauguet (Ombres sur Venise is dedicated to him), Maurice Jaubert, Guy Sacre, Narcís Bonet, and Karol Beffa.

He is passionate about French melody, and works for a better knowledge and a renewal of the genre. He founded the associations Contrechants (1991-1995), for which he gave concerts concerts "Piano au Palais-Royal", in collaboration with the Bibliothèque nationale. and Les Donneurs de sérénades (1997-1998), performing melodic cycles at the Maison de la Poésie). With composer Guy Sacre he holds concerts-conferences centered on musical and literary themes, such as les musiques de la nuit, la musique et les éléments, and les masques et bergamasques, which featured Fauré and Debussy around Verlaine and Watteau.

His version of Poulenc's L'Histoire de Babar, le petit éléphant, with Hugues Cuénod, is now a reference.

Among his latest records, his CD devoted to Déodat de Séverac's piano work was awarded a Diapason d'or.

Eidi is an academic at the Conservatoire à rayonnement régional de Paris, the Schola Cantorum de Paris, as well as at the Académie internationale d'été de Nice and Nancy.

He is regularly invited for master classes, both in France and abroad (notably in Spain, China, Japan and South Korea).

== Discography ==
These tastes are to be found in his 15 albums, featuring many premières. These include works for piano (Sauguet, Milhaud, Scriabine, Sacre, Satie, Poulenc, Séverac) and melodies (Ravel, Debussy, Poulenc, Auric, Honegger, Chausson, Delage, Sacre), as well as Albert Roussel's complete work, with Marie Devellereau, Yann Beuron and Laurent Naouri.

- Maurice Delage: mélodies with Sandrine Piau, Jean-Paul Fouchécourt and Jean-François Gardeil
- Guy Sacre: Œuvres pour piano (Timpani)
- Déodat de Séverac: Baigneuses au soleil, Cerdana, Sous les lauriers roses, Les Naïades and le Faune indiscret (Pionovox)
- Erik Satie: Socrate - 6 Nocturnes - with Jean Belliard
- Guy Sacre - Mélodies with Florence Katz and Jean-François Gardeil
- Guy Sacre - 24 Préludes for piano (Timpani)
- Ravel/Poulenc: Mélodies with Jean-François Gardeil
- Gabriel Fauré: Mélodies with Yann Beuron
- Arthur Honegger: Les Mélodies with Brigitte Balleys and Jean-François Gardeil (Timpani)
- Henri Sauguet: Mélodies with Jean-François Gardeil (Timpani)
- Darius Milhaud: Première Sonate; Printemps; L'Automne; Quatre Sketches; Sonatine
- Claude Debussy / Albert Roussel: Les mélodies with Jean-François Gardeil (Adda)
- Gabriel Fauré: treize Barcarolles and the 3rd collection of melodies (with tenor Yann Beuron)

== Recognition ==
- 1981: Second Prize of the Concours international Viotti-Valsesia
- 1985: Best Piano Singing Team Award at the "Francis Poulenc International Competition" (with baritone Jean-François Gardeil)
- Laureate of the Menuhin Foundation
- 1993: Grand Prix of the Académie Charles-Cros and Grand Prix of the "Nouvelle Académie du Disque français"
