= Maurice Emmanuel =

French composer (1862–1938)

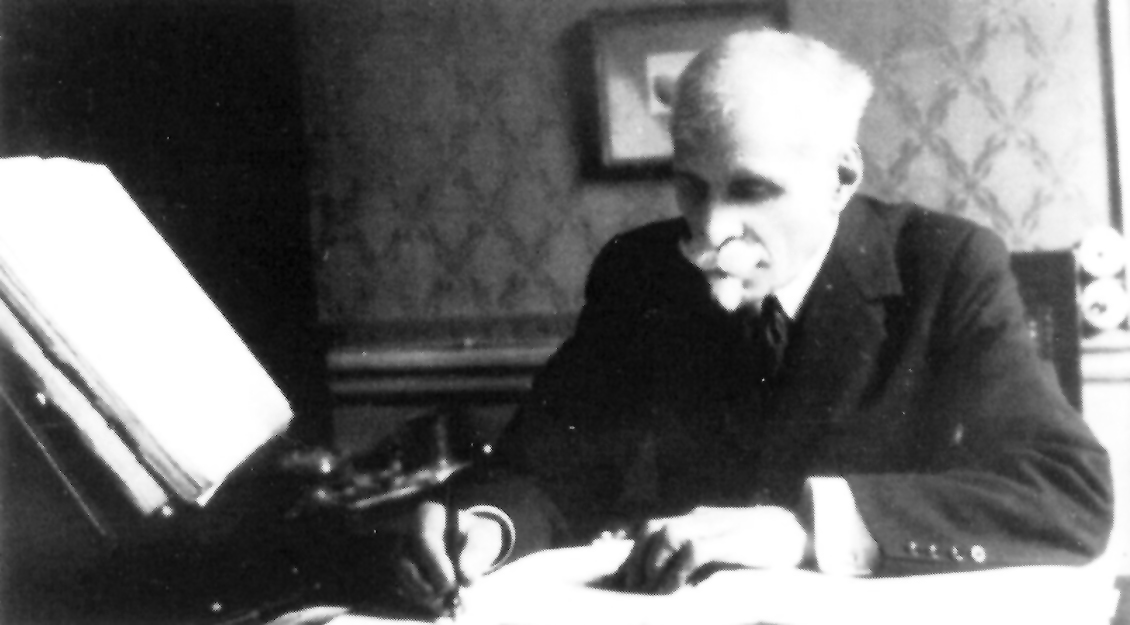
Maurice Emmanuel in 1930

Marie François Maurice Emmanuel (2 May 1862 – 14 December 1938) was a French composer of classical music and musicologist born in Bar-sur-Aube, a small town in the Champagne-Ardenne region of northeastern France. It was there where he first heard his grandfather's printing press which according to his granddaughter, Anne Eichner-Emmanuel, first gave him the feeling of rhythm.

Brought up in Dijon, Maurice Emmanuel became a chorister at Beaune cathedral after his family moved to the city in 1869. According to his granddaughter, Anne Eichner-Emmanuel, he was influenced by the brass bands on the streets of Beaune and by the "songs of the grape pickers which imprinted melodies in his memory so different from all the classical music he was taught in the academy of music." Subsequently, he went to Paris, and in 1880 he entered the Paris Conservatoire, where his composition teacher was Léo Delibes. His other teachers included Théodore Dubois (harmony) and Louis-Albert Bourgault-Ducoudray (history). Emmanuel also studied classics, poetics, philology and art history at the Sorbonne and École du Louvre. Delibes' strong disapproval of his early modal compositions (Cello Sonata, Op. 2, Sonatinas No. 1, Op. 4 and No. 2, Op. 5) caused a rift between them and his expulsion from Delibes' class. Emmanuel subsequently went to study with Ernest Guiraud, also at the Conservatoire. At the Conservatoire he came to know Claude Debussy who was also a pupil there. In addition, he attended the Conservatoire classes of César Franck, about whom he wrote a short book in 1930 (César Franck: Etude Critique).

Emmanuel pursued a notable academic career. He wrote a treatise in 1895 on the music of Ancient Greece, for which he earned a doctorate in 1896. He taught art history at the Lycée Racine and Lycée Lamartine until 1904, when he became choirmaster at the church of Sainte-Clotilde, assisted by Émile Poillot, during the tenure of organist Charles Tournemire, serving until 1907. He was appointed professor of the history of music at the Conservatoire in 1909, and taught there until 1936. His daughter, Marthe Emmanuel initially pursued history but went on to earn a doctorate in geography. His students included Robert Casadesus, Yvonne Lefébure, Georges Migot, Jacques Chailley, Olivier Messiaen and Henri Dutilleux. Emmanuel destroyed all but 30 works composed up to 1938; he died in Paris that year.

Emmanuel's interests included folksong, Oriental music, and exotic modes — his use of these modes in various of his works had appalled Delibes, who had vetoed his entering for the Prix de Rome. The compositions of Emmanuel, seldom heard today even in France, include operas after Aeschylus (Prométhée enchaîné and Salamine) as well as symphonies and string quartets. Probably the creations of his most often performed now are his six sonatines for solo piano, which (like many of his other pieces) demonstrate his eclectic academic interests. The first of the sonatines draws on the music of Burgundy, while the second incorporates birdsong, the third uses a Burgundian folk tune in its finale, and the fourth is subtitled en divers modes hindous ("in various Hindu modes").

== Recordings ==
- Complete Songs - Odelettes anacréontiques op. 13; Musiques op. 17; Vocalise-étude op. 24; In memoriam op. 11. Florence Katz, Marie-Catherine Girod, Timpani (record label), 1995
- Songs of Burgundy - orchestral songs. Florence Katz, Jean-Pierre Quénaudon, Laure Rivierre (piano), Choeur de Bourgogne, cond. Roger Toulet Marco Polo (record label), 1995
- Chamber Music - Sonata for Cello and Piano, Op. 2; Trio for Flute, Clarinet and Piano, Op. 11; Suite on Greek Folk Songs, Op. 10; Sonata for bugle and piano, Op. 29; String Quartet, Op. 8. Various Artists Timpani (record label), 2010
- Symphonies, Suite, Overture - Overture for a Gay Story, Op. 2; Symphony No. 1 in A, Op. 18; French Suite, Op. 26; Symphony No. 2 in A, Op. 25. Slovene Philharmonic Orchestra, cond. Emmanuel Villaume Timpani (record label), 2010

- 6 Sonatines (Op. 4, Op. 5, Op. 19, Op. 20, Op. 22, Op. 23) - Laurent Wagschal, piano Timpani (record label), 2010
