= Le Flibustier =

Le Flibustier may refer to

- Le flibustier (opera), by César Cui, composed during 1888–1889
- Le Flibustier, an 1888 play by Jean Richepin
- French destroyer Le Flibustier, ship in the French Navy, launched in 1939
