= Les Nuits d'été discography =

Les Nuits d'été (Summer Nights), Op. 7, is a song cycle by the French composer Hector Berlioz, setting six poems by Théophile Gautier. The cycle, completed in 1841, was originally for soloist and piano accompaniment. Berlioz orchestrated one of the songs in 1843 and did the same for the other five in 1856. The cycle was neglected for many years, but during the 20th century it became, and has remained, one of the composer's most popular works. Of the many recordings made in the 20th and 21st centuries, most are of the orchestrated version and are sung by a soprano or mezzo-soprano.

== Single female voice ==
Recordings include:

- Victoria de los Ángeles, soprano (1955). Boston Symphony Orchestra, conductor Charles Munch (RCA Victor)
- Brigitte Balleys, mezzo-soprano. Orchestre des Champs-Élysées, conductor Philippe Herreweghe (Harmonia Mundi, 1995)
- Janet Baker, mezzo-soprano (1967). New Philharmonia Orchestra, conductor Sir John Barbirolli (EMI)
- Agnes Baltsa, mezzo-soprano. London Symphony Orchestra, conductor Jeffrey Tate (Philips)
- Régine Crespin, soprano (1963). Orchestre de la Suisse Romande, conductor Ernest Ansermet (Decca)
- Suzanne Danco, soprano. Cincinnati Symphony Orchestra, conductor Thor Johnson (London)
- Joyce DiDonato, mezzo-soprano. New York Philharmonic Orchestra, conductor Alan Gilbert (New York Philharmonic)
- Bernarda Fink, mezzo-soprano. Deutsches Symphonie-Orchester Berlin, conductor Kent Nagano (Harmonia Mundi, 2007)
- Véronique Gens, soprano. Orchestre national de l'Opéra de Lyon, conductor Louis Langrée (Virgin)
- Bernadette Greevy, mezzo-soprano (1989). Ulster Orchestra, conductor Yan Pascal Tortelier (Chandos)
- Katarina Karnéus, mezzo-soprano (1999). BBC Philharmonic, conductor Vassily Sinaisky (BBC)
- Lorraine Hunt Lieberson, mezzo-soprano. Philharmonia Baroque Orchestra, conductor Nicholas McGegan (Philharmonia Baroque)
- Jessye Norman, soprano. London Symphony Orchestra, conductor Colin Davis (Philips)
- Anne Sofie von Otter, mezzo-soprano. Berlin Philharmonic Orchestra, conductor James Levine (Deutsche Grammophon)
- Anne Sofie von Otter, mezzo-soprano. Les Musiciens du Louvre, conductor Marc Minkowski (Naïve, 2011)
- Leontyne Price, soprano. Chicago Symphony Orchestra, conductor Fritz Reiner (RCA Victor)
- Eleanor Steber, soprano. Columbia Symphony Orchestra, conductor Dimitri Mitropoulos (Sony)

== Single male voices ==
- Nicolai Gedda, tenor. Swedish Radio Symphony Orchestra, conductor Silvio Varviso (Bluebell, 1968)
- José van Dam, bass-baritone. Orchestra della Svizzera Italiana, conductor Serge Baudo (Forlane)
- Jean-Paul Fouchécourt, tenor. Quatuor Manfred (Paraty, 2019)
- Stéphane Degout, tenor, Les Siècles, conductor François Xavier Roth (Harmonia Mundi 2019)
- Michael Spyres, tenor, Orchestre Philarmonique de Strasbourg, conductor John Nelson (Erato Warner classics 2022)
