= Bruno Belthoise =

French classical pianist and improviser

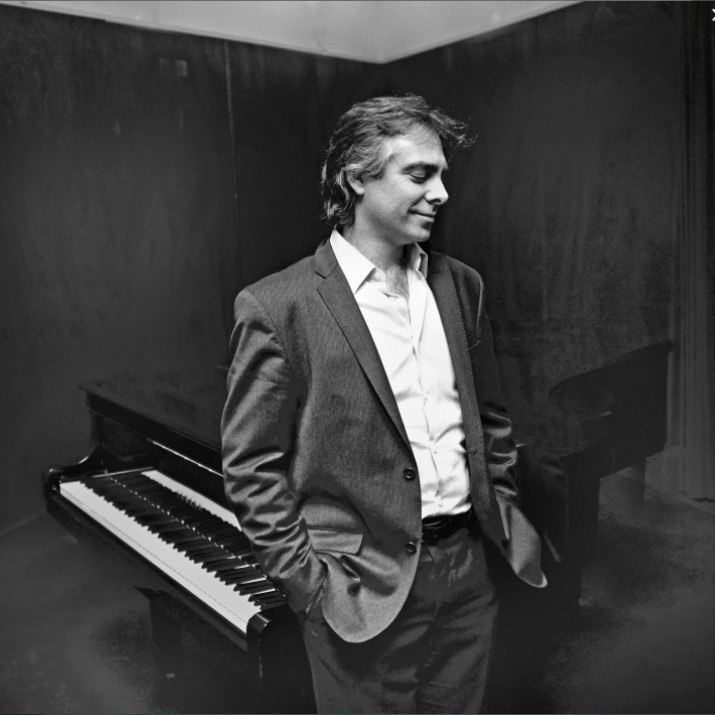
Bruno Belthoise 2012.

Bruno Belthoise (born 9 July 1964) is a French classical pianist and improviser.

== Biography ==
Born in Paris, Belthoise comes from a family of artists. His grandfather Guy Verdot, a writer and drama critic, introduced him to theatre and literature. His aunt Béatrice Belthoise, an actress, is at the origin of his taste for narration. His mother Dominique Verdot, a graduate of History of Art, took him to Italy and museums to discover the masters of the Quattrocento. Finally, his grandmother Yvonne Lephay-Belthoise, a violinist and pianist, encouraged him to develop his gifts for music. Belthoise began his musical studies at the piano at the age of seven with Isabelle Duha but also percussion with Serge Biondi and violin with his grandmother. Feeling more deeply attracted by the piano, he continued his musical studies with her and then met pianist Claude Maillols who, for five years, taught him technique and repertoire.

== Studies, awards, concerts ==
In 1985, Belthoise entered the École normale de musique de Paris in Françoise Buffet-Arsenijevic's class, also studying in parallel with Madeleine Giraudeau-Basset. In 1987 he obtained the Diploma of Teaching unanimously of the jury then the Superior Diploma of Execution of piano in 1989, the same year as the pianist Frederic Chiu. He then perfected his skills on various occasions with François-René Duchâble, Bruno Rigutto, Helena Sá and Costa. He also studied harmony with Françoise Lengelé. From 1985 onwards, his qualities as a chamber musician were noticed by several performers with whom he gave his first concerts (Jean-Claude Dewaele, Maurice Gabay, Frédéric Laroque, Jean-Philippe Audin, Pascal Meslé...) and recorded in 1987 for the Cybelia Records, the three sonatas by Johann Sebastian Bach BWV 1027-1029 in Les Solistes Français series. In 1988, he received the Charles Oulmont Prize from the Fondation de France and in 1991 he was laureate of the Laurent-Vibert Foundation. Belthoise has been invited since 1993 by festivals in France and abroad (Festival International de la Vézère, Les Concerts de Vollore, Festival de l'été Mosan, Festival d'Estoril...). He performs as soloist or with his partners (Yves Charpentier, Anne Chamussy, Christophe Giovaninetti, the Concert Impromptu, the Ensemble viennois de Paris, the Trio Pangea). He may also be heard on France Musique, the Saarländischer Rundfunk or Antena 2 in Lisbon where he likes to interpret the French repertoire: Fauré, Poulenc, Honegger, Milhaud, Roussel, up to the composers of today. He gave first performances of works by Emmanuel Hieaux, Bernard de Vienne, Marc Kowalczyk, Louis Marischal, Alberto Colla, Raymond Alessandrini.

Bruno Belthoise was named Classic Revelation by the Société civile pour l'administration des droits des artistes et musiciens interprètes in 1997.

== Music by Portuguese composers ==
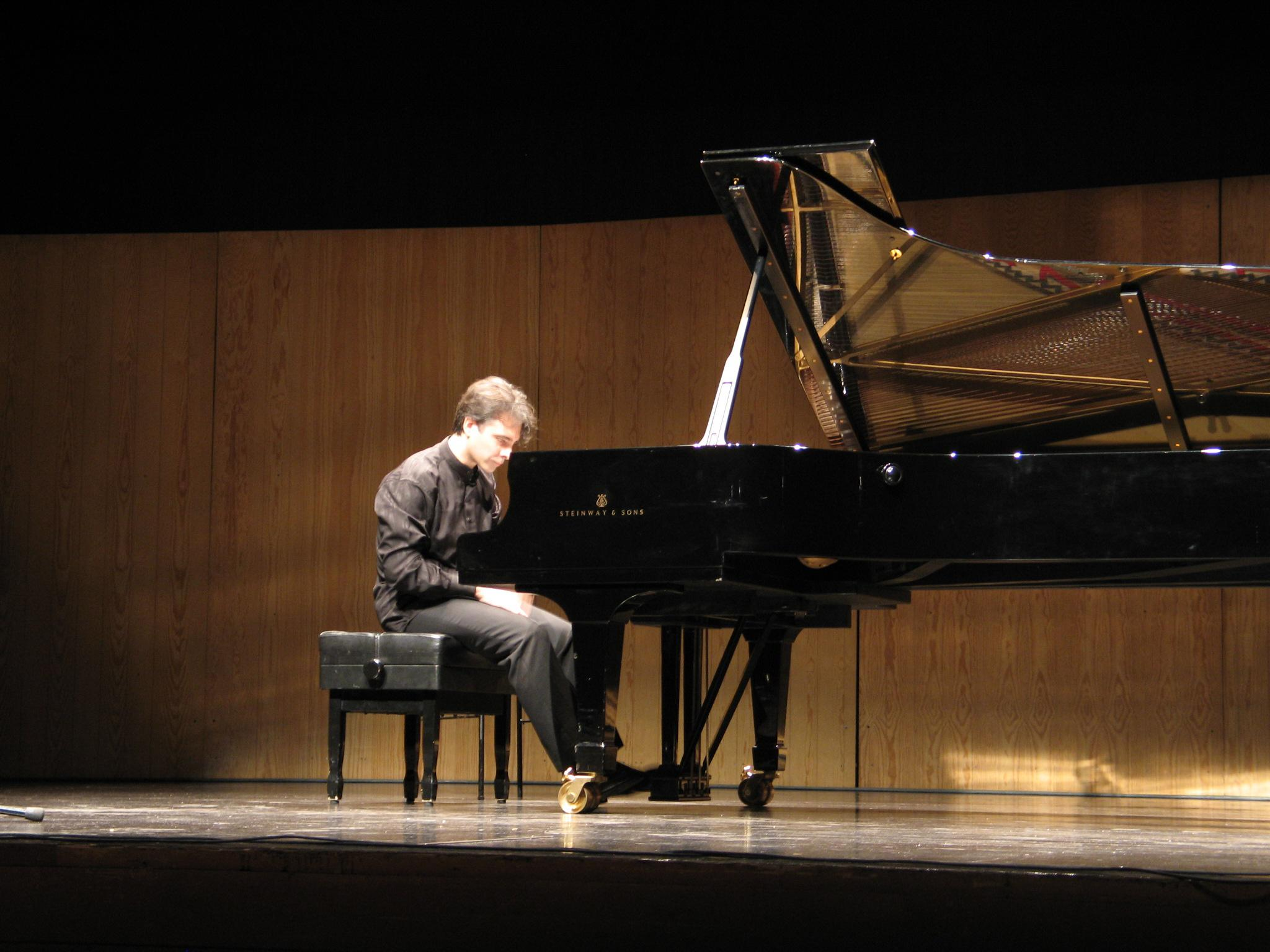
Centro Cultural de Belém, hommage à Fernando Lopes Graça, 2006

From 1993, Belthoise began a very personal research work towards an original repertoire. Deeply attracted by unknown works and passionate about Portuguese culture, he multiplied the opportunities to come into contact with the piano repertoire of Portuguese composers. In 1995, he recorded his first solo piano album (Disques Coriolan) devoted to the works of Francisco de Lacerda (1869–1934), a conductor and composer friend of Claude Debussy. This world premiere recording, published in France, was hailed by the French and Portuguese press. Like a founding act, this record designated Belthoise as an essential interpreter of 20th century Portuguese music. Between 1999 and 2011, Belthoise recorded several other monographs which are world premieres for Coriolan Records in the series Le Piano Portugais: Armando José Fernandes (1906–1983), Luiz Costa (1879–1960), Fernando Lopes-Graça (1906–1994), Alexandre Delgado (1965–).

He is also invited by Universities for conferences, (Lille 3, Lyon 2, Montreal...) writes articles for the specialized press (Piano, Latitudes, Seara Nova magazines) and gives recitals in Europe and North America. Since 2001, he has been regularly collaborating as soloist with the Portuguese national radio RDP-Antena 2 for live concerts and recordings. In a spirit of collaboration with current Portuguese composers, he is also at the origin of several commissions and has created works by Sérgio Azevedo (1968-), Alexandre Delgado (1965-) and Fernando Lapa (1950-). In parallel, he is developing a six-volume anthology of scores dedicated to Portuguese composers for piano with AvA Musical Editions. His work is encouraged by the most prestigious institutions in Portugal (Ministério da Cultura, Fundação Gulbenkian, Instituto Camões, RDP-Antena2...)

== Young audience concerts ==
The world of childhood, storytelling and narration is a field in which Belthoise likes to evolve, create, imagine and invent. Indeed, since 1995 he has endeavoured to defend on the one hand the sound and literary heritage, and on the other hand living music as an educational vehicle in its own right. In addition, he engages in a close collaboration between writing, narration and musical creation to give birth to works that lead children to discover the musical world as a stimulation of the imagination. For him, as for "Frémeaux & Associés", his publisher, sound is like writing, it offers the possibility to the child to build his own dreamlike world and his reflection. It does not impose a pre-established universe and frees the young listener's imagination. A fine storyteller, Belthoise is also the author of narrative texts, co-written with his wife Béatrice Belthoise, and cultivates this storytelling art that he associates with his piano.

He designs and records three albums for La Librairie Sonore by Frémeaux & Associés: La véritable histoire de Babar (1997), Hänsel & Gretel (2003), Les aventures de Poucette (2008). Thanks to several shows for young audiences Belthoise tours concerts in front of thousands of children throughout France (Opéra Bastille, Arsenal de Metz, Opéra de Lille...), as well as in French-speaking countries (Switzerland, Belgium, Quebec). In these productions, he collaborates with his privileged partners: Laurent Martin (piano), Sébastien Marq (flute), Le Concert Impromptu (wind quintet) and Christina Margotto (piano). It is with the latter that he conceived since 2010 the series of Concertos Narrados at the Conservatory of Porto. Through this initiative, which combines musical creation and educational activities in five languages (French, Portuguese, Spanish, German, English), new works are created such as "Homero" (2012), a tale by Sophia de Mello Breyner Andresen to music by Fernando Lapa. The success of his albums and shows has been continually highlighted by the press since 1997, confirming that this quality educational project has nothing to envy either audiovisual or multimedia.

== Collaborations ==
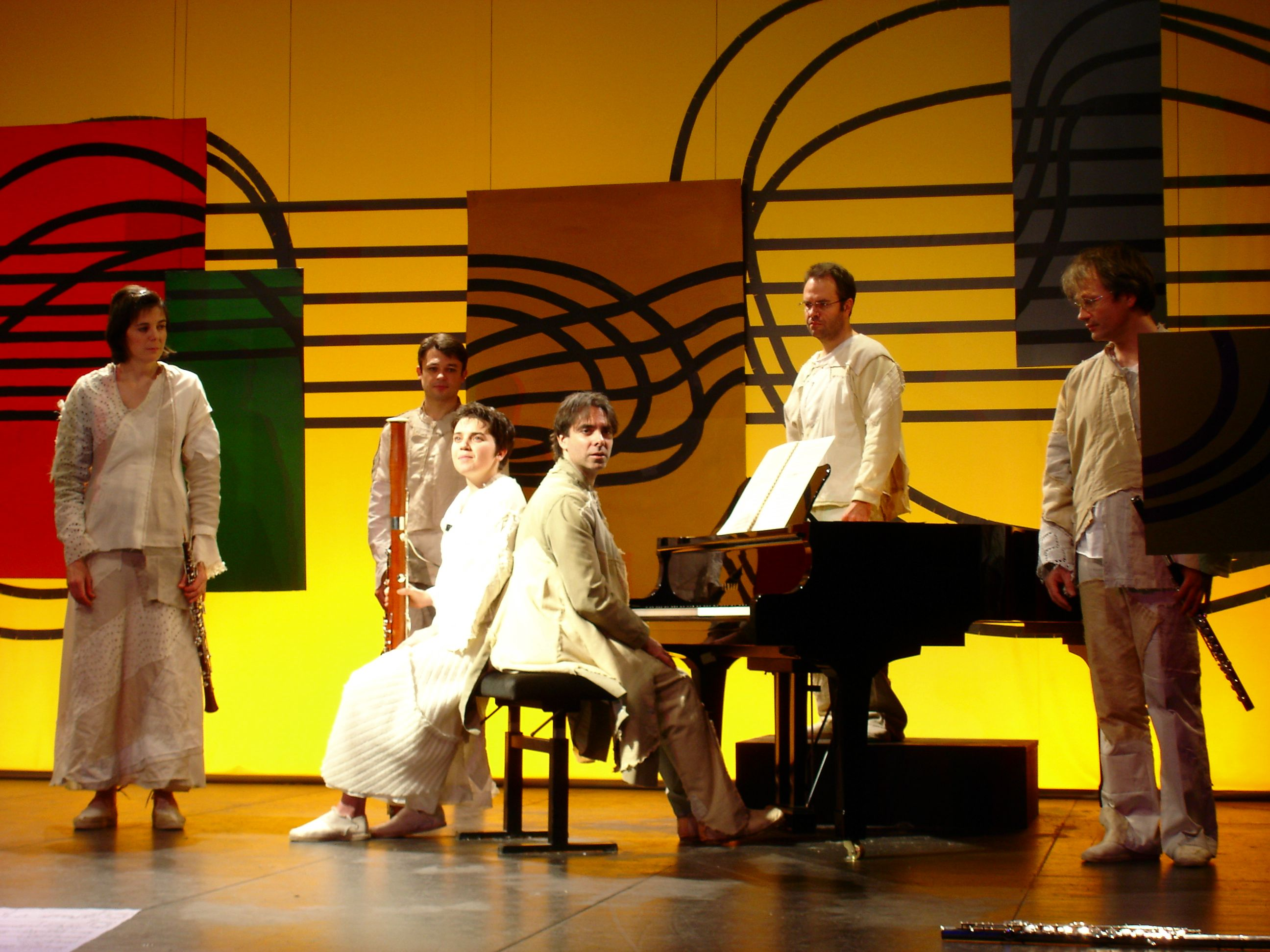
Belthoise and the Concert Impromptu, spectacle Bleu d’Outremer, Scène Nationale de Cavaillon (2005)

His need for diversity in modes of expression led Belthoise to meet the Syrian singer-songwriter Abed Azrie. Together they produced recitals and an album "Chants d'Amour et d'Ivresse" (2002) recorded live at Radio-France. He also composed for the wind quintet the Concert Impromptu for its show'Nouvelles Folies d'Espagne' (2002). His artistic collaboration with Le Concert Impromptu has also given rise to several shows, in which a polysemy is invented that brings together poetry, contemporary music and scenography. Thus, were created Bleu d'Outremer pour stimuler l'esprit (2005), echoing René Char's fulgurances and Vieira da Silva's painting, Mozart de Vienne (2007), meeting and confrontation between Bernard de Vienne, living composer and Wolfgang Amadeus Mozart, Pèlerinage Rothko (2009), inspired by Mark Rothko's vibrant painting. Their new production for the 2013 season is entitled BWK, musical theatre in homage to Berthold Brecht, Kurt Weill and Paul Klee. Passionate about poetry and improvisation, he has been working since 2003 as a pianist, composer and actor with the Compagnie Alain Rais for Le Poète à New York (2003), Traverser (2006) and gives poetry-music recitals with Alain Rais, Inês de Medeiros and Matthieu Fayette. In 2008, Belthoise created the Trio Pangea with Adolfo Rascón Carbajal (violin) and Teresa Valente Pereira (cello) and performs in Spain, France and Portugal. The new album of the Trio Pangea which was released in 2013 was dedicated to composer Emmanuel Hieaux's chamber music published by Disques Coriolan in the Musique d'Aujourd'hui series. For the 50th anniversary of Francis Poulenc's death in 2013, he gave the complete works for wind quintet and piano in two concerts with the Concert Impromptu for the radio Antena 2 then recorded with the same ensemble an album dedicated to Darius Milhaud in collaboration with the RDP.

== Discography ==
- Johann Sebastian Bach: Trois sonates BWV 1027 - 1029 CY 1102
- Ensemble Viennois de Paris: Un soir à Vienne EV 9804
- Francis Poulenc's L'Histoire de Babar, le petit éléphant & Camille Saint-Saëns's Le Carnaval des Animaux FA 804
- Emmanuel Hieaux & Georges Bizet: Hänsel & Gretel, Jeux d’Enfants FA 836
- Francisco de Lacerda: Œuvres pour piano COR 330 701
- Armando José Fernandes: Œuvres pour piano COR 330 901
- Armando José Fernandes: Sonatas COR 330 0201
- Luiz Costa: œuvres pour piano COR 330 0001
- Alexandre Delgado: Bamboleio COR 33à 301
- Bruno Belthoise: Fandango pour quintette à vent LCI 02/02 1AA
- Abed Azrié et ses musiciens: Live in Radio-France 2CD NTCD807
- Raymond Alessandrini: Les Aventures de Poucette FA 869
- Bernard de Vienne: Les Identités remarquables COR 330 0901
- Fernando Lopes Graça & José Atalaya: Geografia da Música IV NUM 1208
- Fernando Lopes Graça: Melodias Rústicas Portuguesas COR 330 028
- Emmanuel Hieaux: Une goutte d’ombre COR 330 110

== Bibliography ==
- Grand témoin — Bruno Belthoise : Vers un piano de l'imaginaire, in Improvisation so piano, Jean-Pierre Thiollet, Neva éditions, 2017, p. 143-150. ISBN 978 2 35055 228 6
