= Émile Poillot =

French organist and pianist

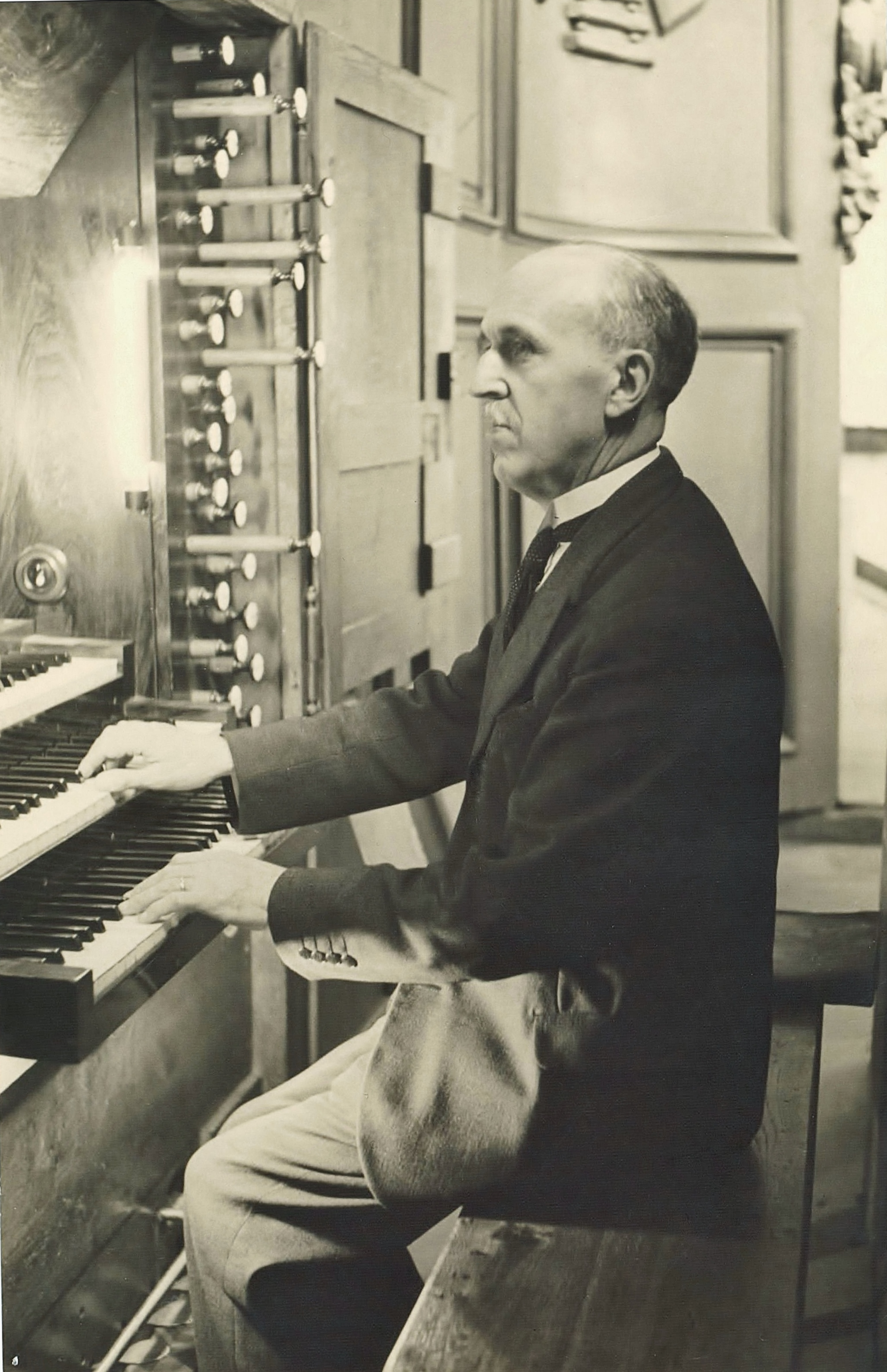
Émile Poillot at the console of St. Benignus organ, Oct. 2, 1938

Émile André Poillot (French pronunciation: [emil ɑ̃dʁe pwajo]) (10 March 1886 – 22 June 1948) was a French pianist, organist, and pedagogue.

== Life ==
Émile Poillot was born in Dijon, Côte-d'Or, France, on 10 March 1886. He received his first musical training from his father, Jules Poillot, who has been playing the choir organ of the Saint-Michel church in Dijon during 54 years. In 1895, Émile Poillot joined the choir of the Dijon Cathedral, directed by the Reverend Father René Moissenet, whose brother and assistant, the Reverend Father Joseph Moissenet, gave him piano lessons and introduced him to play the organ. In 1900, he went to the Dijon Conservatory in Adolph Dietrich's piano and harmony classes. He won a first prize in piano performance in 1901 and in harmony in 1902.

In October 1903, he entered the Conservatoire de Paris, where he studied piano in Isidor Philipp’s class and received a first prize in piano performance under Philipp's successor, Édouard Risler, in 1907. Then he studied organ with Alexandre Guilmant and Louis Vierne and received a first prize in organ performance and improvisation under Guilmant's successor, Eugène Gigout, in 1911:

That year the great favorite was Émile Poillot. He had won his first prize in piano in Diémer’s [sic; actually Risler’s] class and his organ work foretold an unusually good competition – the prophecy was not wrong … Poillot, keen to emulate his predecessors, had held the school’s banner high.

— Louis Vierne, Mes souvenirs.

Poillot also studied the history of music with Maurice Emmanuel.

From 1904 to 1907, at the Basilica of Sainte-Clotilde in Paris, Poillot was assistant to Maurice Emmanuel, the choirmaster, and substitute for Leon Cazajus, the choir organist, during the tenure of Charles Tournemire at the great organ.

In 1911, he was named the regular organist at the Cathedral of St. Benignus in Dijon. He played the organ during 36 years, until his death.

In 1919, he was appointed as professor of piano at the Conservatory of Dijon and this position he held for 25 years.

He died in Dijon on 22 June 1948 (aged 62). André Fleury took over from him in 1949 as organist at the Cathedral of St. Benignus and professor of piano at the Conservatory of Dijon.

Among his students were Michel Chapuis and Ralph L. Grosvenor.

His grandson, Michel Poillot, is the organist of the Basilica Notre-Dame-de-Bonne-Garde in Longpont-sur-Orge, Essonne, France, since 1997.

A street is named after him in Dijon.

== Performer ==
As an organist, Poillot falls within the tradition of performers and improvisers of the French school of the early twentieth century. He was particularly known for his brilliant improvisations. At that time, it was rare to hear the organ outside the offices or religious events. However, some concerts have marked his career, such as the broadcast performance he gave on 19 March 1932 at the Salle Pleyel in Paris.

As a pianist, Émile Poillot gave many concerts, solo or as accompanist. He accompanied his friend cellist Maurice Maréchal during several tours in Spain (1925 and 1926), in France (1928), in Singapore (7 August 1933), and in the Dutch East Indies (August and September 1933).

== Compositions ==
- Allegretto in E (May 1913), revised by Yves Cuenot, who interpreted it on 2 June 2013 at the great organ of Dijon Cathedral.
- Ave Maria (1918), Lyon, Janin Frères, Éditeurs, J.F. 1023, To my dear and revered Master the Canon René Moissenet, Chapel Master of the Dijon Cathedral.

== Dedications ==
- Maurice Emmanuel, Three pieces for organ or harmonium Op. 14 (1892-1911), to Émile Poillot (1892).
- Charles Tournemire, The Mystical Organ, 51 Offices of the Liturgical Year based on the freely paraphrased Gregorian chants, cycle after Pentecost, No. 40, Op. 57, Domenica XIV post Pentecosten, to his friend Poillot, organist of the Dijon Cathedral (1934).
- Louis Vierne, Twenty-four pieces in free style, Op. 31, Book II (1913), 24. Postlude, Quasi fantasia to Émile Poillot.

== Premieres ==
- 3 anacreontic odelets, Op. 13 (1911), written by Maurice Emmanuel, on 27 March 1912 in Paris.
- First sonatina for piano, called Burgundian, Op. 4 (1893), written by Maurice Emmanuel, on 14 March 1923 in Dole, Jura.
- Second sonatina for piano, called Pastoral, Op. 5 (1897), written by Maurice Emmanuel, on 11 November 1922 in Beaune, Côte d'Or.
