= Miarka =

Miarka may refer to:

- Miarka (novel), an 1883 novel by Jean Richepin
- Miarka (play), a 1905 play by Jean Richepin based on his novel
- Miarka (1920 film), a French silent film directed by Louis Mercanton
- Miarka (1937 film), a French film directed by Jean Choux
- Miarka (opera), an opera based on the same source
