= L'Histoire de Babar, le petit éléphant =

French piano composition

- Piano music by Francis Poulenc
- Catalogue: FP 129
- Based on: Histoire de Babar by Jean de Brunhoff
- Composed: 1940–45
- Scoring: narrator; piano

L'Histoire de Babar, le petit éléphant (The story of Babar, the little elephant), FP 129, is a composition for narrator and piano by Francis Poulenc, based on Histoire de Babar and written from 1940. Orchestral versions were later written by Jean Françaix and David Matthews.

== Genesis ==
During the summer of 1940, Francis Poulenc stayed with cousins in Brive-la-Gaillarde. The children of the house, bored by his piano playing, put the book Histoire de Babar by Jean de Brunhoff on his piano and asked him to "play" the story. Poulenc obliged and freely improvised around the narrative situations that were proposed to him. In the following years, he often recalled this incident. L'Histoire de Babar was born from his memories.

The score is dedicated to the eleven children who inspired it: "For my little cousins Sophie, Sylvie, Benoît, Florence and Delphine Périer; Yvan, Alain, Marie-Christine and Marguerite-Marie Villotte; And my little friends Marthe Bosredon and André Lecœur, in memory of Brive". It was created in a broadcast on 14 June 1946 played by the composer, assisted by the recitation of Pierre Bernac. In 1962, Jean Françaix proposed an orchestral version of the piece, which satisfied Poulenc. The English composer David Matthews also transcribed it for chamber orchestra.

L'histoire de Babar is one of Francis Poulenc's most popular compositions. According to Guy Sacre, "it is in every respect a success, and one of the most accomplished works he has given to his instrument".

== Structure ==
This narrative composition presents itself as an "uninterrupted succession of pianistic images". Diverse musical forms succeed each other:

- Elephantine berceuse sung by Babar's mother (pp. 1–2), whom he then recalls with tears (pp. 10)
- Valse musette of the pastry (pp. 12–13)
- Babar's wedding march, celebrated by pompous chords (pp. 26–27)
- Dancing polka played on the evening of the same wedding (pp. 27–29)
- Nocturne in the form of a lunar reverie (pp. 30–31)

== Selected recordings ==
Recordings with piano solo include:

- A recording of L'Histoire de Babar, le petit éléphant was made in 2012 by Natalie Dessay, narrator and Shani Diluka piano, at éditions Didier Jeunesse.
- Pierre Fresnay, narrator, and Francis Poulenc piano
- Raymond Gérôme, narrator, and Jacques Février piano
- Bruno Belthoise, narrator and pianist, éditions Frémeaux et associés 1997
- Jean-Marc Luisada, piano; Jeanne Moreau, narrator (1993)

Among the recordings for orchestra are:

- one with Barry Humphries, narrator, with the Melbourne Symphony Orchestra under the direction of John Lanchberry in 1997 (Naxos)
- one with Peter Ustinov, narrator, with the Orchestre de la Société des concerts du Conservatoire under the direction of Georges Prêtre (EMI Classics)
- one with Sophie Marceau, narrator, with the orchestre de l'opéra de Lyon under the direction of Kent Nagano in 1994 (ERATO junior)
- one with Àgata Roca, narrator, with the Ensemble Orquestra de Cadaqués under the direction of Philippe Entremont in 2004 (Tritó)

== Bibliography ==
- Johnson, Graham (2013). "L'histoire de Babar, le petit éléphant, FP129". Hyperion Records.
- Sacre, Guy (1998). La Musique de piano (in French). Robert Laffont. pp. 2130–2131. ISBN 978-2-221-08566-0.
- Schmidt, Carl B. (1995). The Music of Francis Poulenc (1899–1963): A Catalogue. Oxford: Clarendon Press. ISBN 978-0-19-816336-7.
- Southon, Nicolas (2014). Francis Poulenc: Articles and Interviews: Notes from the Heart. Ashgate Publishing. ISBN 978-1-4094-6622-2.
- "Jacques Fevrier / Tacchino / Brunhoff - Poulenc: histoire de babar le petit elephant / Ravel: ma mere l'oye". cdandlp.com.
- "Concerts narratifs" (in French). Bruno Belthoise.
- "L'histoire de Babar, le petit éléphant FP.129" (in Dutch). muziekweb.nl.
- "Histoire de Babar, le petit éléphant. FP 129" (in French). catalogue.bnf.fr. 1994.
