= Florence Katz =

French opera singer

Florence Katz is a contemporary French a mezzo-soprano, graduated from the Conservatoire de Paris, she is also a singing teacher at the Conservatory of Bourg-la-Reine/Sceaux. She specializes in the French repertoire. She is a recipient of the Darius Milhaud Prize.

== Education ==
A pupil of Régine Crespin and Gabriel Bacquier at the Conservatoire de Paris, Katz completed three years of training at the Studio of the Centre de Musique Baroque de Versailles (conducted by Rachel Yakar and René Jacobs, then Marc Minkowski), as well as master classes with Daniel Ferro, Ileana Cotrubas, Suzanne Danco, Irène Joachim, Gérard Lesne, Janine Reiss, Gérard Souzay.

Katz sang with conductors Jonathan Darlington, Emmanuelle Haïm, Marc Minkowski, Manuel Rosenthal, Christophe Rousset, Marc Soustrot, and with pianists David Abramovitz, Solange Chiapparin, Jeff Cohen, Serge Cyferstein, Billy Eidi, Marie-Catherine Girod, Christian Ivaldi, Maciej Pikulski, Alain Planès, Mercedes Proteau, Laure Rivierre, Marie-Pascale Talbot, Alexandre Tharaud, Jean-François Zygel... and with Leonie Rysanek, Lucia Valentini Terrani, Rockwell Blake, Ruggero Raimondi...

Katz performed in Paris (Auditorium du Louvre, Invalides, Musée d'Orsay, Opéra-comique, Opéra Bastille, Salle Cortot, Salle Pleyel, Sorbonne,...), Versailles (Opéra du château, Trianon, Théâtre de la Reine, Théâtre Montansier...), Marseille, Aix-en-Provence, Lille, Lyon, Strasbourg, Geneva, Munich, Dresden, Madrid, Kiev.

== Prizes and distinctions ==
- Singing and Art lyrique prizes of the Conservatoire de Paris
- Prix Honegger and SACEM at the international competition of French melodists
- 1st Prize unanimously at the Darius Milhaud competition
- Prix Roussel at the international competition of La Plaine-sur-Mer
- Winner, unanimously, of the Yehudi Menuhin Foundation
- Winner of the "forum de la mélodie et du Lied" (organised by the Culture Ministry)

== Concerts ==
- Debut at 22 years at the Théâtre des Champs-Élysées, as La Périchole, directed by Jérôme Savary.
- Roles of Dorabella (Cosi fan tutte / Mozart), Metella (La Vie parisienne / Offenbach), Sorceress (Dido and Aeneas / Purcell)...
- Recitals with piano or instrumental ensembles, in France and Europe.

== Discography ==
- Gabriel Fauré / Ernest Chausson. Mélodies sur des poètes symbolistes (Lyrinx)
- Darius Milhaud. Alissa et autres poèmes en prose (Timpani)
- Maurice Emmanuel. Integral melodies (Timpani)
- Guy Sacre. Melodies (Timpani)
- Gabriel Dupont. Integral melodies (Timpani)
- Maurice Emmanuel. XXX chansons bourguignonnes (Naxos Records)
- Arthur Honegger. 6 poems by Jean Cocteau / Darius Milhaud. Les machines agricoles (Naxos)
- André Jolivet: Poems for the child (and other works) (ADDA)
- Darius Milhaud: Vocal quartets (ADDA)
- Monic Cecconi-Botella: Le Tombeau de Van Gogh. (REM)
- Monteverdi, Rossini, Fauré. Soundtrack of the film The sentinel by A. Desplechin (Delabel / Virgin Musique)
- Jean-Philippe Rameau: Hippolyte et Aricie - role of Oenone (Arkiv prod./Deutsche Grammophon)
