= Gabriel Dupont =

French composer

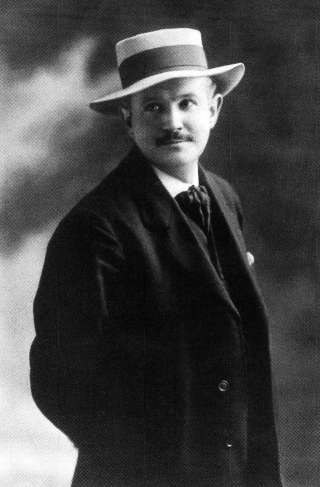
Gabriel Dupont, 1901

Gabriel Édouard Xavier Dupont (1 March 1878 – 2 August 1914) was a French composer, known for his operas and chamber music.

== Biography ==
Dupont was born in Caen. Following after his father who was a teacher at the Malherbe secondary school and the organist at the Church Saint-Étienne in his home town, Dupont began his studies at the Paris Conservatory at the age of 15. There he studied composition with Jules Massenet, harmony with Antoine Taudou, and descant with André Gedalge. In 1895, he was also given instruction on the organ by Alexandre Guilmant. Between 1897 and 1903, he studied composition with Charles-Marie Widor.

In 1901, while performing his military service, Dupont competed for the Prix de Rome. He won second prize, behind André Caplet but ahead of Maurice Ravel. He was also named laureate of the Sonzogno competition for his opera La Cabrera, which was later presented with success at La Scala and then at the Théâtre national de l'Opéra-Comique in 1905.

In 1903, Dupont composed a cycle of fourteen pieces for the piano, Les Heures dolentes, during his convalescence from his first bout of tuberculosis – the disease that would ultimately cause his death at the age of 36. While residing at Cap Ferret, in a small island refuge for tuberculosis patients, he composed another cycle of ten pieces for the piano, La Maison dans les dunes (1908–1909). Maurice Dumesnil premiered the suite on 3 June 1910 at the Salle Pleyel.

Dupont wrote three more operas: La Glu (1909), a Breton melodrama based on a novel by Jean Richepin; La Farce du cuvier (1911), using a libretto by Henri Caïn; and Antar (1912–14), also using a Caïn libretto. Antar was performed after Dupont's death in a grandiose and exotically dark production at the Opéra Comique in March 1921.

Dupont died from tuberculosis in Le Vésinet. The monument on his tomb is prominent in the cemetery there.

Dupont's brothers also had artistic careers. Maurice, curator of the Guimet Museum, was an Oriental expert and man of letters. Robert (1874–1949) was a landscaper for Sarthe and Brittany, as well as an official painter of the town halls of Paris.

== Selected works ==
Based on Adriano Spampanato's thesis.

Operas

- La Cabrera, libretto by Henri Cain (1903)
- La Glu, libretto by Jean Richepin and Henri Cain (1908)
- La Farce du cuvier (1911)
- Antar, libretto by Chekri Ganem (1913)

Vocal

- Trois Choeurs, songs from Normandy for women's choir (1900)
- Poèmes d'automne, songs (1904)

Orchestra

- Jour d'été « Esquisse symphonique » (1900)
  Matinée ensoleillée
  Sous-bois, l'après-midi
  Nocturne
- Le Chant de la Destinée, symphonic poem (1908)

Organ

- Allegretto (1898)
- Élévation en Si bémol majeur
- Pièce en forme de canon, published in L'Orgue moderne, 10th issue, edited by Charles-Marie Widor and Alexandre Guilmant (Paris: Leduc, 1898)
- Méditation, published in L'Orgue moderne, 15th issue, edited by Charles-Marie Widor and Alexandre Guilmant (Paris: Leduc, 1899)
- Pour la Toussaint (1902)
- Offertoire, Élévation and Sortie, published in Archives de l'organiste, vol. 4, edited by H. Delépine (Arras: Procure Générale de musique religieuse, c. 1902)
- Largo «Au maître Charles-Marie Widor», transcription from L.van Beethoven sonata op.2 n°2, 2nd movement. Edited by E. Demets (Paris, 1902).
- Choral «A mon ami Louis Vierne, organiste de Notre-Dame de Paris.», transcription from Robert Schumann's Choral, Symphonie No. 3. Edited by E. Demets (Paris, 1902).
- Pour la Toussaint «A mon ami Louis Vierne». Edited by E. Demets (Paris, 1902).

Piano

- Deux Airs de Ballet (1895)
  Pavane
  Aria
- Feuillets d'album (1897)
  Valse
  Fughette
  Berceuse
  Air à danser
- Les Heures dolentes (1905)
- La Maison dans les Dunes (1909)

Chamber

- Journée de Printemps for violin and piano (1901)
- Poème for piano and string quartet (1911)

== Recordings ==
Dupont's complete works for solo piano have been recorded by Émile Naoumoff, Marie-Catherine Girod, and Bo Ties.

A recording of La Cabrera has been released on the Bongiovanni label.

A recording of "Les Heures Dolentes", played by pianist Daniel Blumenthal, was released on the Cybella label.

Dupont's "Poème", "Journées de Printemps", as well as selections from "Heures dolentes" and "La Maison dans les dunes", were recorded by Marie-Catherine Girod and the Pražák Quartet and released on the Mirare label in 2014.

Cyrille Dubois and his pianist Tristan Raës released The Complete Songs of Gabriel Dupont in January 2025.

== Bibliography ==
- Robert Jardillier, Hommage à Gabriel Dupont, in Revue de Bourgogne, vol. 12, p. 635–646 (Dijon, 1924)
- Philippe Simon, Gabriel Dupont (1878–1914), ou La Mélancolie du Bonheur, Atlantica-Séguier (2001).
- Adriano Spampanato, Gabriel Dupont, un compositeur méconnu, CNSMDP, Master's thesis, 2016
- Adriano Spampanato, En attendant Dupont ..., in: Revue Massenet, no. 14, p. 50–58, Mortagne-au-Perche 2018
- Bo Ties, An Orchestral Approach to the Piano Works of Gabriel Dupont. Remembering and Recording a Forgotten Musician, DMA (Doctor of Musical Arts) thesis (University of Iowa, 2018)
