= Alexandre Georges =

French organist and composer (1850–1938)

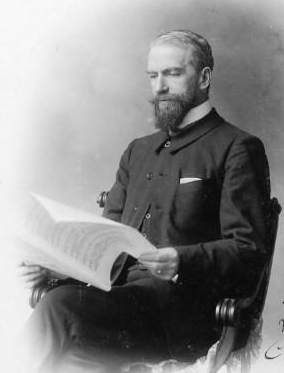
Alexandre Georges (1903)

Alexandre Georges (25 February 1850 – 18 January 1938) was a French organist, teacher and composer. Of his compositions, his most successful opera was Miarka, given at the Opéra-Comique and later at the Opéra. His most popular work was the song-cycle, Chansons de Miarka.

== Life ==
Born in Arras, Georges studied at the École Niedermeyer de Paris, after which he joined the army and subsequently became maître de chapelle at the Basilica of Saint Clotilde, Paris, where César Franck was organist. He later became organist at Saint-Vincent de Paul. In addition to his church appointments he was a teacher, returning to the École Niedermeyer as professor of harmony, and was also a successful organ teacher.

Strongly attracted by the theatre, Georges composed several operas, of which the most successful was Miarka, premiered at the Opéra-Comique and later revised for a production at the Opéra. It tells the story of a Romany girl destined, according to the tarot cards, to become a queen. He wrote the incidental music for two important symbolist plays by Villiers de L'Isle-Adam, performed at the Paris Odéon in the 1890s. His Requiem Mass was performed before 10,000 people outside Arras Cathedral in the 1920s, commemorating France's soldiers who died in the First World War. His most popular work was Les chansons de Miarka, a cycle of fourteen songs for voice and piano, with words by Jean Richepin (1888).

Georges died, aged 87, on 18 January 1938. According to Grove's Dictionary of Music and Musicians and Baker's Biographical Dictionary of Musicians he died in Paris; obituaries in Le Figaro and Le Temps say that he died in his native Arras.

== Works ==
According to Grove, Georges' style, is "often restlessly chromatic", showing the influence of Franck, but like many composers of his generation, "he introduced local colour into his works by using characteristic regional dances and songs".

=== Operas ===
- Le Printemps (1888)
- Poèmes d'amour (1892)
- Charlotte Corday (1901)
- Miarka (1905)
- Myrrha (1909)
- Sangre y sol (1912)

=== Church music ===
- Notre Dame de Lourdes
- Balthazar
- Chemin de Croix
- Passion
- Requiem Mass

=== Symphonic poems ===
- Leila
- La Naissance de Venus
- Le Paradis perdu

=== Song cycle ===
- Chansons de Miarka for voice and piano (also with orchestra)

== Sources ==
- Slonimsky, Nicolas; Laura Diane Kuhn (2001). "Georges, Alexandre". Baker's Biographical Dictionary of Musicians. New York: Schirmer Books. OCLC 1028661730.
