= Marthe Emmanuel =

French geographer, historian (1901–1997)

- Born: 20 August 1901; Chaville (Hauts-de-Seine
- Died: 15 May 1997 (aged 95); Le Mée-sur-Seine (Seine-et-Marne)
- Education: University of Paris
- Occupations: Geographer, historian, biographer
- Known for: Histories of polar explorers
- Father: Maurice Emmanuel

Marthe Emmanuel (20 August 1901 – 15 May 1997) was a French geographer, historian, and biographer. Emmanuel's work focused on the history of geography, particularly on polar scientific explorers from France. She initially devoted her writings to biographies about Jean-Baptiste Charcot, describing both his contributions to science and the explorer's personality. She then published research about other explorers, including Robert Falcon Scott. Her works have been awarded several prizes.

== Biography ==
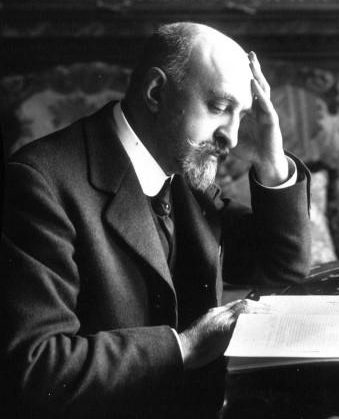
Jean-Baptiste Charcot in 1914

Marthe Emmanuel was born in Chaville (Hauts-de-Seine) 20 August 1901. Her father was the composer Maurice Emmanuel (1862–1938). She became an engineer at the French National Centre for Scientific Research (CNRS), where she organized the journal Mémoires et Documents.

She became the long-time assistant and collaborator of the French explorer Jean-Baptiste Charcot. He regularly came to see her at the Château de Montaure (Eure). After Charcot died in 1936, Emmanuel became his biographer, publishing three books based on his letters and logbooks.

In 1956, she defended her doctoral thesis on the history of geography, France and Polar Exploration: From Verrazano to La Pérouse, 1523–1788, at the University of Paris. Her thesis included a discussion of the first polar explorer, the ancient Greek geographer Pytheas. She then recounts the various Celtic and Viking expeditions, the discovery and rediscovery of Cape Horn, and mentions lesser-known French explorers such as Jean-François Regnard in Lapland in 1861 and Pierre Louis Maupertuis in the Arctic Circle in Finland. While the English and German expeditions are well-documented, Emmanuel's thesis complemented those other works by offering the French perspective. Her research drew on archives and historical texts, producing a comprehensive and authoritative overview of the Arctic and Antarctic.

She served as the editorial secretary of the Bulletin of the Association of French Geographers and then librarian of the French Geographical Society.

She died on 15 May 1997, at Le Mée-sur-Seine (Seine-et-Marne).

== Tributes and awards ==
- Montyon Prize of the French Academy and Conrad Malte-Brun Prize of the Geographical Society in 1944 for Charcot, polar navigator
- Marcelin Guérin Prize of the French Academy in 1960, Georges Dreyfus Prize and Prize of the Naval Academy for France and Polar Exploration
- Her portrait appeared on a stamp with the French Southern and Antarctic Lands in 2007

== Selected works ==
- Marthe Emmanuel (preface by Jean de La Varende), Charcot, Polar Navigator, Éditions des Loisirs,1943, 205 p.
- Marthe Emmanuel (preface by Jules Sottas), Jean-Baptiste Charcot, and "Polar Gentleman", Éditions Alsatia, 1945, p. 192
- Marthe Emmanuel, Scott, the hero of the South Pole, 1946, 143 p.
- Marthe Emmanuel, France and Polar Exploration, Nouvelles éditions latines Doullens, 1959, 399 p.
- Marthe Emmanuel (preface by Paul-Émile Victor), Such Was Charcot: 1867–1936, Beauchesne, coll. "Figures of Yesterday and Today", 1986 (ISBN 978-2-7010-1134-9)
