= Yvonne Lephay-Belthoise =

French violinist (1914–2011)

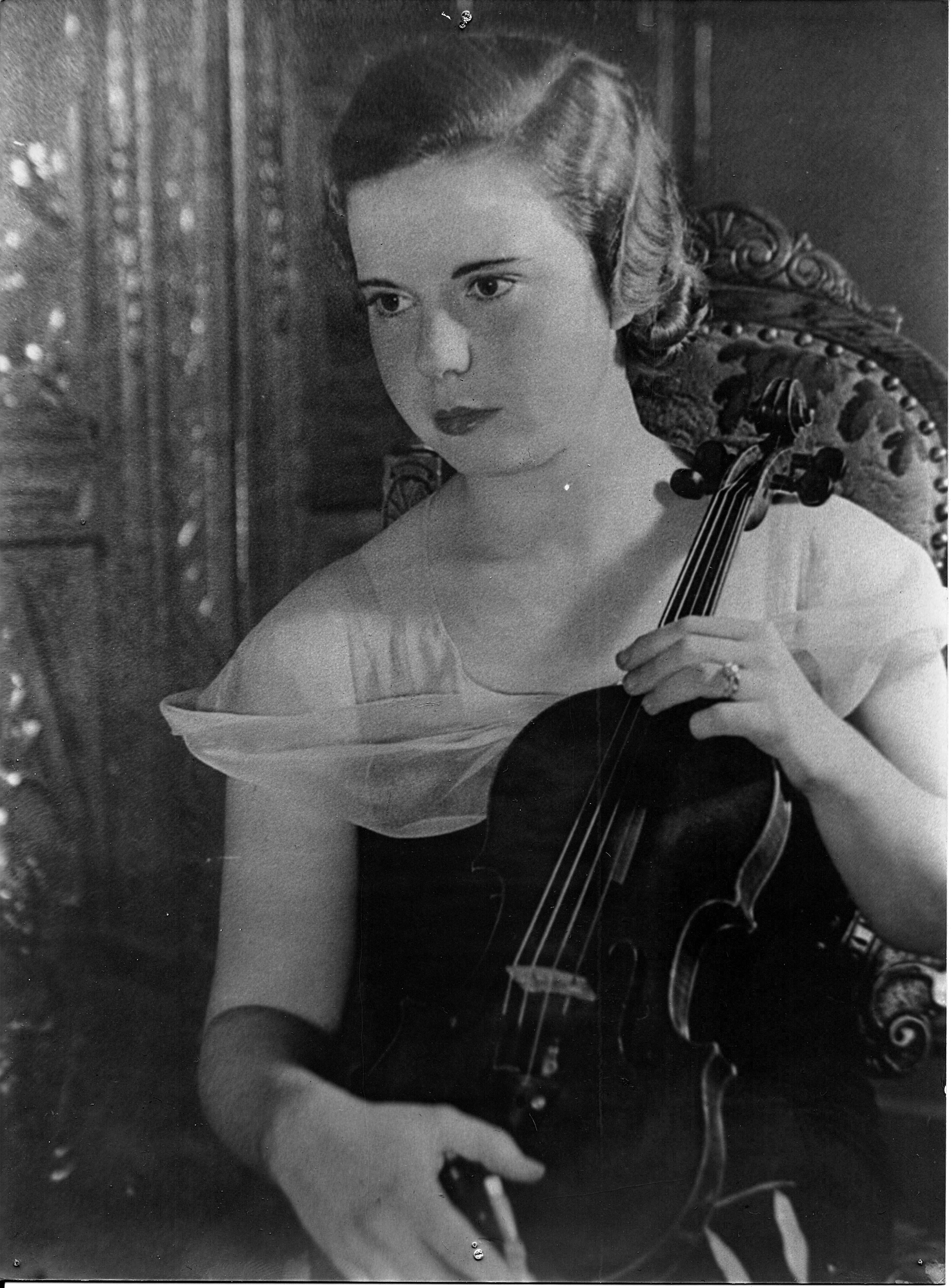
Yvonne Lephay in 1934

Yvonne Lephay-Belthoise (27 September 1914 – 17 November 2011) was a French virtuoso violinist.

== Life ==
=== Training ===
Born in Dieppe, after having worked the piano with Joseph Morpain, harmony with Jean Gallon, chamber music with Jean Roger-Ducasse and violin with Jules Boucherit in 1934, Lephay-Belthoise obtained her First Prize in violin in 1935 unanimously at the Conservatoire de Paris in Gabriel Bouillon's class.

=== Career ===
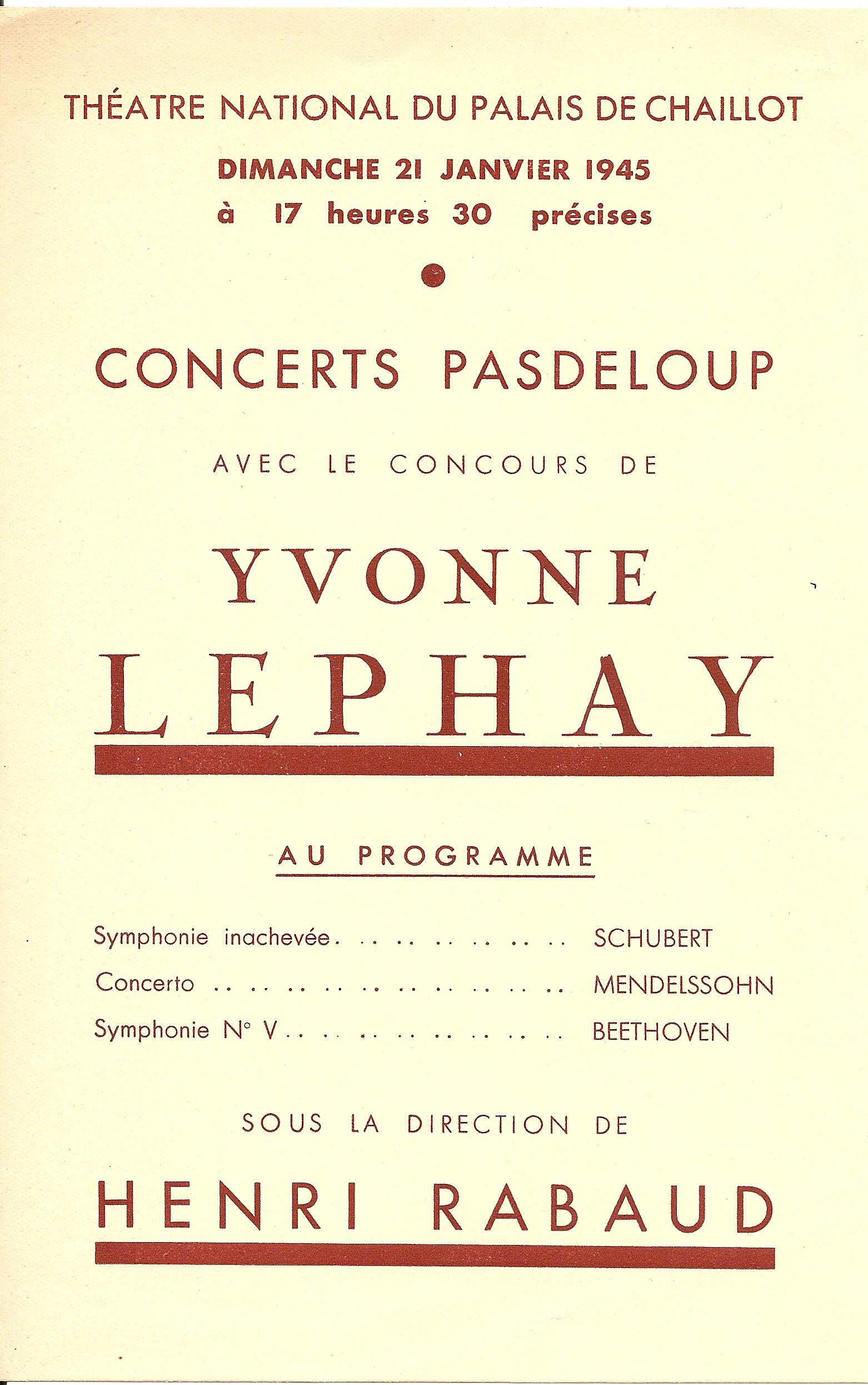
Programme

From 1936, she performed in recitals in Paris (Salle Gaveau, Salle du Conservatoire, Théâtre de l'Œuvre, Salle Cortot) with partners such as Lucette Descaves, Wanda Landowska, Jean Neveu, Boris Zadri, Robert Bernard, Maurice Faure as well as a soloist with the Pasdeloup Orchestra.

In May 1936, at the École normale de musique de Paris, accompanied by the Orchestre Fémininin de Paris and its conductor Jane Evrard, she presented the Concertos in E major by Bach and E flat by Mozart in the first part. Then, in the second part, she played the "Romance" in F by Beethoven, pieces by Paradis, Kreutzer, Kreisler:

She then showed ease, velocity, elegance, lightness, brilliance. In a charming Cansonella of Spanish essence, where the dream is combined with the fantastic, and created by Mr. Joaquín Rodrigo, whose first offer he made to Mrs. Lephay. The audience made it a great success. Mrs. Evrard and her symphonists assisted her as she wished.

Belonging to the same generation as Ginette Neveu (1919–1949), Lephay-Belthoise was considered by Henri Rabaud as "one of the most brilliant representatives of our beautiful French violin school". Her repertoire included works emblematic of French music like E. Chausson's Poème, the Sonates for violin and piano No 1 and No 2 by Fauré, Ravel's Tzigane, Lalo's Rapsodie norvégienne and Symphonie espagnole and Saint-Saëns' Havanaise.

She also performed the German repertoire: Bach, Schumann, Brahms, Beethoven and was the first violinist to play Mendelssohn's Violin Concerto again in public at a concert at the Théâtre National de Chaillot on 21 January 1945 with the Pasdeloup Orchestra conducted by Henri Rabaud, Mendelssohn's music having been prohibited from performance during the occupation by the Nazi regime (see poster opposite).

During her career, Lephay-Belthoise conducted several first auditions of composers of the time and works dedicated to her: Claude Delvincourt (Danceries), René Challan (Concerto for violin and orchestra), Yvonne Desportes (Variations pour violon), Georges Hüe (Fantaisie pour violon), César Sautereau (Concerto pour violon et orchestre), Jean Martinon (Suite nocturne), Michel Ciry (La pastorale mystique)

In 1946, she participated with Pierre Barbizet to the Milhaud festival in Paris and then toured several times until 1949 in recital for the Alliance Française in the countries of northern Europe (Denmark Sweden, Norway) as well as with the Philharmonic Orchestra of Randers. On these occasions, she performed concertos from the repertoire, French music and gives lectures on French composers. Invited every year, the Scandinavian press unanimously consecrated her as a world-class violinist.

A member of the Orchestre symphonique de Paris under the direction of Pierre Monteux, she was one of the first female musicians admitted to national orchestras and joined the Orchestre philharmonique de Radio France at the request of Désiré-Émile Inghelbrecht. She spent the first year of the occupation in Rennes where the radio had retreated. She was then appointed concertmaster of the ORTF Radio-Lyric Orchestra, a position she held until 1974.

=== Private life ===
Lephay Belthoise had four children and encouraged her daughter, the actress Béatrice Belthoise, who trained at the Conservatoire national supérieur d'art dramatique, who has a career in French theatre and television. Lephay-Belthoise was also at the origin of the musical studies of her grandson, the pianist Bruno Belthoise, whose evolution she closely followed from the 1980s.

== Tours in Scandinavia ==
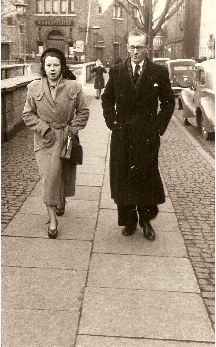
Yvonne Lephay and Robert Bernard, Denmark, in 1948.

Between 1946 and 1949, Lephay-Belthoise, accompanied by Robert Bernard, made regular tours in Scandinavia (Denmark Sweden, Norway) organised by the Alliance française. She was invited to perform in recital with piano and with the Randers symphony orchestra. The press considers Lephay-Belthoise, then 32 years old, as one of the first performers of French music of her time.
