= Jean-François Gardeil =

French baritone and theatre director

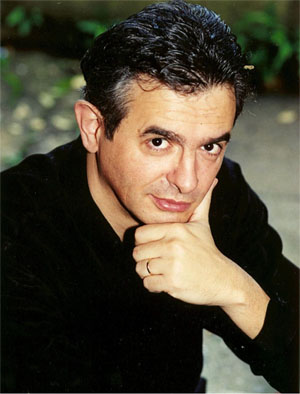
Jean-François Gardeil

Jean-François Gardeil is a French baritone and theatre director. He is also the founder and artistic director of the Chants de Garonne.

== Biography ==
Originally from Agen, Gardeil, after studying at the Lycée Fermat and a Master of Arts at Toulouse University, studied singing at the Lausanne Conservatory, then at the École d'Art Lyrique of the Opéra de Paris. A prizewinner of the Ravel Academy, the Toulouse International Competition (French Melody Prize) and the Yehudi Menuhin Foundation, he was first known as a performer of Baroque music and Mozartian repertoire.

=== Baritone ===
With William Christie and Les Arts Florissants, he made manyconcert tours around the world, singing in thirty countries. In particular, he played one of the leading roles in Atys by Lully, at the Opéra-Comique, Florence and New York in 1987, 1989 and 1992. He was also Straton in Alceste by Lully at Versailles and the Théâtre des Champs-Élysées, production Martinoty-Malgoire, La Hire in La fée Urgèle by Favart at the Opéra-Comique, with Jean-Marie Villégier and Christophe Rousset, Saül in David et Jonathas by M.A. Charpentier (tour in concert version in France and England) with William Christie, also sang in Karlsruhe and Schwetzingen in Tarare by Salieri (prod Martinoty-Malgoire), played the title role in Les surprises de l'Amour by Rameau at Montpellier (Barrat-Christie)…

He sang the three roles of Don Giovanni (theater in Rennes), Leporello (Opéra-Comique) and Masetto (Angers-Nantes Opéra) in the same year 1987. In the 1990s, he also sang Guglielmo then Don Alfonso (Cosi fan tutte) in various productions.

In French opéra comique, he has notably sung the roles of Moralès and Le Dancaïre in Carmen (at Limoges and Besançon) Frédéric in Lakmé (Opéra-Comique, Nancy), Brétigny in Manon (Opéra-Comique).

Gardeil also sang and recorded with Gustav Leonhardt, Michel Corboz, Emmanuel Krivine, Armin Jordan, Michel Plasson, Serge Baudo, Lothar Zagrosek, Alan Curtis, Friedman Layer, and worked with directors such as Antoine Vitez, Pier-Luigi Pizzi, Jean-Marie Villégier, Jean-Louis Martinoty, Nicolas Joel, Pierre Barrat, Goran Järvefelt, Antoine Bourseiller, Christian Gangneron.

Jean-François Gardeil is also fond of French melody: Associated with the pianist Billy Eidi, with whom he gives concerts in France and abroad, he has received the Grand Prix of the Académie Charles Cros, and that of the New Disk Academy for their integral of the melodies by Honegger (at Timpani). A specialist in Poulenc, Ravel and Debussy, he is also a specialist in the music of les Six. He performed the discographic creation of the Darius Milhaud cycle Tristesses (at Maguelone), and recorded the mélodies by Ernest Chausson, Maurice Delage, Guy Sacre, Aubert Lemeland and Henri Sauguet (Timpani).

=== Teacher ===
Interested in teaching, he founded in 1991 "Les Chants de Garonne", and in 2000 "Opéra de Gascogne", a light lyrical structure that contributes to the detection of singers and the broadcasting of shows in south-western France. He is also a jury member at the Conservatoire de Genève, of Toulouse and the Ravel Academy in Saint-Jean-de-Luz.

=== Director ===
Finally, Jean-François Gardeil is also passionate about mise en scène.

To his credit, a tour of L'Orfeo by Claudio Monteverdi with Gilles Ragon, Claire Brua and Fernand Bernadi, first stage adaptation of La descente d'Orphée aux Enfers by Marc-Antoine Charpentier, and King Arthur by Henry Purcell.

In 2000, he created the opera La Voie Écarlate by Jacques Castérède and Michel Serres.

In 2002 and 2003, two Offenbach works, La Belle Hélène and La Périchole, with Anna Holroyd. This latter work will be revived in 2004 in Toulouse and Tarbes. In January 2002, he also staged a chamber opera performance in Bordeaux and the Aquitaine Region, which brought together Le pauvre matelot by Darius Milhaud and Jean Cocteau, Le Piège de Méduse by Érik Satie, and The Telephone by Gian Carlo Menotti, in a coproduction Grand Théâtre de Bordeaux -OARA- Chants de Garonne.

2004 saw the creation of Fleurs, flèches and flammes, a show - of which he is the author. - after madrigals by Claudio Monteverdi, but also a new production of Ciboulette by Reynaldo Hahn.

In 2005 Gardeil staged L'Enfant et les Sortilèges by Maurice Ravel and Colette in Toulouse (production du CNR) and Le voyage dans la lune by Jacques Offenbach at Condom, Toulouse (Cité de l’Espace) and Agen. In 2006, Masques, creation by Marc Bleuse, Dido and Aeneas by Henry Purcell with Guillemette Laurens, at Toulouse, Périgueux, Condom and Agen, as well as a new production of Trois coups by Fabien Prou and Monsieur Choufleuri by Offenbach in several cities in the southwest.

The year 2008 saw the creation of Blanche at the Agen theatre, adapted by J.F Gardeil from the Dialogues des Carmélites, by Francis Poulenc and Georges Bernanos, revived in summer 2008 in the Gers. Also the staging of Véronique by André Messager, a scenic adaptation of oratorios by Giacomo Carissimi and Marc-Antoine Charpentier in the cathédrale Saint-Caprais d'Agen, and most recently The Magic Flute by Mozart.

== Discography ==
=== Under the direction of William Christie (Les Arts Florissants) ===
- Célénus in Atys by Lully (Harmonia Mundi)
- Saül in David et Jonathas by M-A. Charpentier (HM)
- Dorilas in Le Malade imaginaire by Charpentier-Molière (HM)
- Comus in Les Plaisirs de Versailles by Charpentier (Erato)
- Apollon and Titye in La Descente d'Orphée aux enfers by Charpentier (Erato)
- Te Deum and Messe "Assumpta est" by Charpentier (HM)
- Cantates de Campra (Les Femmes, Eneas and Dido) (HM)
- Cantates de Montéclair (Pyrame et Thisbé) (HM)

=== Under the direction of Jean-Claude Malgoire ===
- Straton in Alceste by Lully (Astrée)
- Momus in Platée by Rameau (CBS)
- Carmen Saeculare by Philidor (Erato)
- Messe à quatre chœurs by Charpentier (Erato, reissued at Apex)

=== Others ===
- At Lira d'Arco, under the direction of Michel Laplénie: Messes des Morts by Charles Levens
- At Ama Deus Musique Production, under the direction of Joël Péral: Cantate sur l'Europe by Jean-Paul Lécot
- At Forlane with organist Jean-Paul Lécot: L'orgue "Renaissance" of Saint-Savin in Lavedan
- At Cybélia (reissued at Arion), under the direction of Jonathan Darlington: the friend in Le pauvre matelot by Milhaud

=== French mélodie ===
==== With pianist Billy Eidi ====
- Hommage à Cocteau (melodies by Satie, Honegger, Milhaud, Sauguet, Auris, Sacre…) (Adda) (reissued at Accord)
- Mélodies by Ravel and Poulenc (Histoires naturelles, Mélodies populaires grecques, Don Quichotte à Dulcinée by Ravel, Banalités, Montparnasse and other melodies by Poulenc on poems by Apollinaire) (Adda)
- Mélodies by Debussy and Roussel (Le promenoir des deux amants, les ballades de Villon, Les Fêtes Galantes by Verlaine, the sonnets by Mallarmé by Debussy and various melodies by Roussel) (Adda)
- Integral of Arthur Honegger's melodies (Timpani label)
- Integral of Ernest Chausson's melodies (2 CD) (Timpani)
- Integral of Maurice Delage's mélodies (Timpani)
- Mélodies by Guy Sacre (Timpani)
- Mélodies by Henri Sauguet (Timpani)

==== Others ====
- Chez Maguelone, with pianist Irène Kudela: Mélodies by Darius Milhaud (Tristesses, les soirées de Pétrogrades and Le catalogue de fleurs)
- Chez Intégral, with guitarist Alain Prévost: Mélodies by Aubert Lemeland
