= Armando José Fernandes =

Portuguese composer (1906–1983)

Armando José Fernandes (Lisbon, 26 July 1906 - Lisbon, 3 May 1983) was a neoclassical Portuguese composer; with Jorge Croner de Vasconcelos, Fernando Lopes-Graça, and Pedro do Prado, one of the "group of four" who dominated mid-20th-century Portuguese music. After studying at the National Conservatory of Lisbon (Conservatório Nacional de Lisboa in Portuguese), he won a three-year scholarship to Paris and became a pupil of, among others, Nadia Boulanger.

Originally trained as a concert pianist, Fernandes came to concentrate more on composition and teaching. He composed, among other works, a cello sonata, a violin concerto, and numerous piano pieces. His work, usually of an intimate character, occasionally contains virtuosic passages. It has been described as "[pursuing] a more conventional neoclassical path, albeit with great finesse". Most of his works were written for the national broadcasting station.

From 1940 onwards he taught at the Academia de Amadores de Música in Lisbon, and from 1953 to 1976 at the Lisbon Conservatory.

He also produced editions of early music from Portugal.

== Prizes ==
- Moreira de Sá Prize for composition (1944)
- Prize of the Círculo de Cultura Musical (1946)

== Further references ==
- N. Barreiros: Semana Armando José Fernandes. Lisbon, 1988. (Portuguese)
- Biblioteca Nacional, Centro de Estudos Museológicos: Armando José Fernandes 1906-1983. Fernando Lopes Graça 1906-1994: mostra bibliográfica. Lisbon: Biblioteca Nacional, 2006. (Portuguese)
- Scores and recordings catalogued on Worldcat. Retrieved 24 December 2007.
