= Alexandre Delgado =

Portuguese composer from Lisbon

Alexandre Delgado (born 1965) is a Portuguese composer from Lisbon. He is the composer of the chamber opera O doido e a morte (Death and the Madman) (1993), which premièred at the Teatro Nacional de São Carlos in Lisbon in November 1994, and was later staged at the Theater am Halleschen Ufer in Berlin in December 1996 with Delgado conducting.

== See also ==
- List of Portuguese composers
