= Le flibustier (opera) =

Opera by César Cui

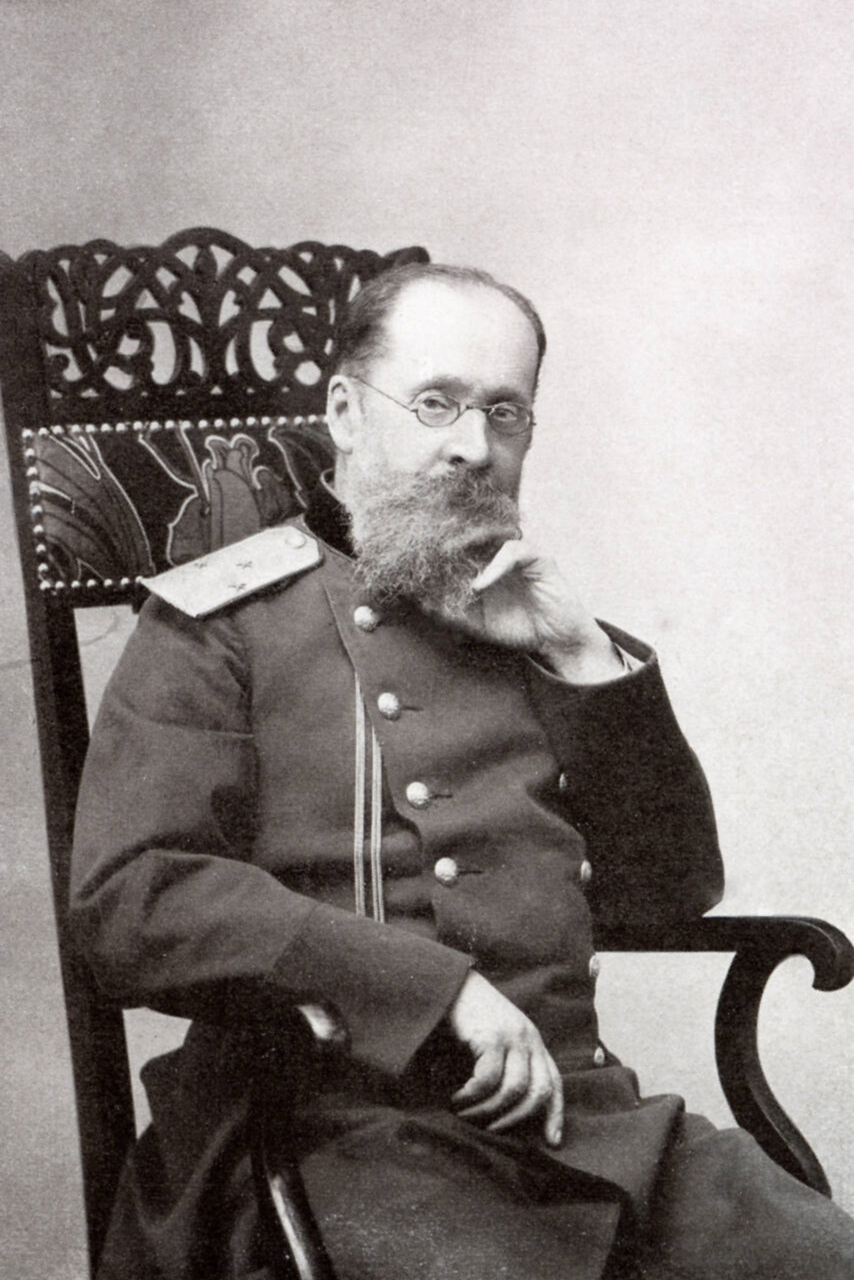
Composer César Cui

Le flibustier is a comédie lyrique (lyric comedy) in three acts, composed by César Cui during 1888–1889. Although the title can translate as The Pirate or The Buccaneer, this is no swashbuckling action-drama, but an idyllic domestic comedy of mistaken identity.

The opera is based on the like-named play by Jean Richepin, who wrote the libretto, and is dedicated to La Comtesse de Mercy-Argenteau. It premiered at the Opéra-Comique in Paris on 22 February 1894, and played for four performances. It was revived in 1908 in a production by students at the Moscow Conservatory under the conductorship of Mikhail Ippolitov-Ivanov, and a Russian edition of the piano-vocal score was printed under the title У моря (U morja = By the Sea). Nevertheless, despite the composer's own special fondness for this work, Le Flibustier seems never to have been performed again and never became part of the standard operatic repertoire.

In the year of its premiere, the composer contributed a rare biographical article entitled "Flibustier in Paris" about his experiences with this opera published in the Russian periodical Knizhki nedeli.

The composer extracted an orchestral suite from this work consisting of the initial Prelude, the Dances that close Act I, and the March in Act III.

The French title of the opera has been transliterated into Cyrillic variously as Флибустьер or Флибюстье. Russian renderings of the French title include Морской разбойник (Morskoj razbojnik) and Пират (Pirat), both meaning "pirate."

== Characters and setting ==
- François Legoëz, old sailor: baritone
- Pierre, his son, a former flibustier: bass
- Jacquemin, a flibustier: tenor
- Janik, granddaughter of François Legoëz: soprano
- Marie-Anne, daughter-in-law of François Legoëz: mezzo-soprano / contralto
- Fishermen, wives of fishermen, girls: chorus

The action takes place in Saint-Malo, at the end of the 17th century, in the dwelling of Legoëz, which overlooks the sea.

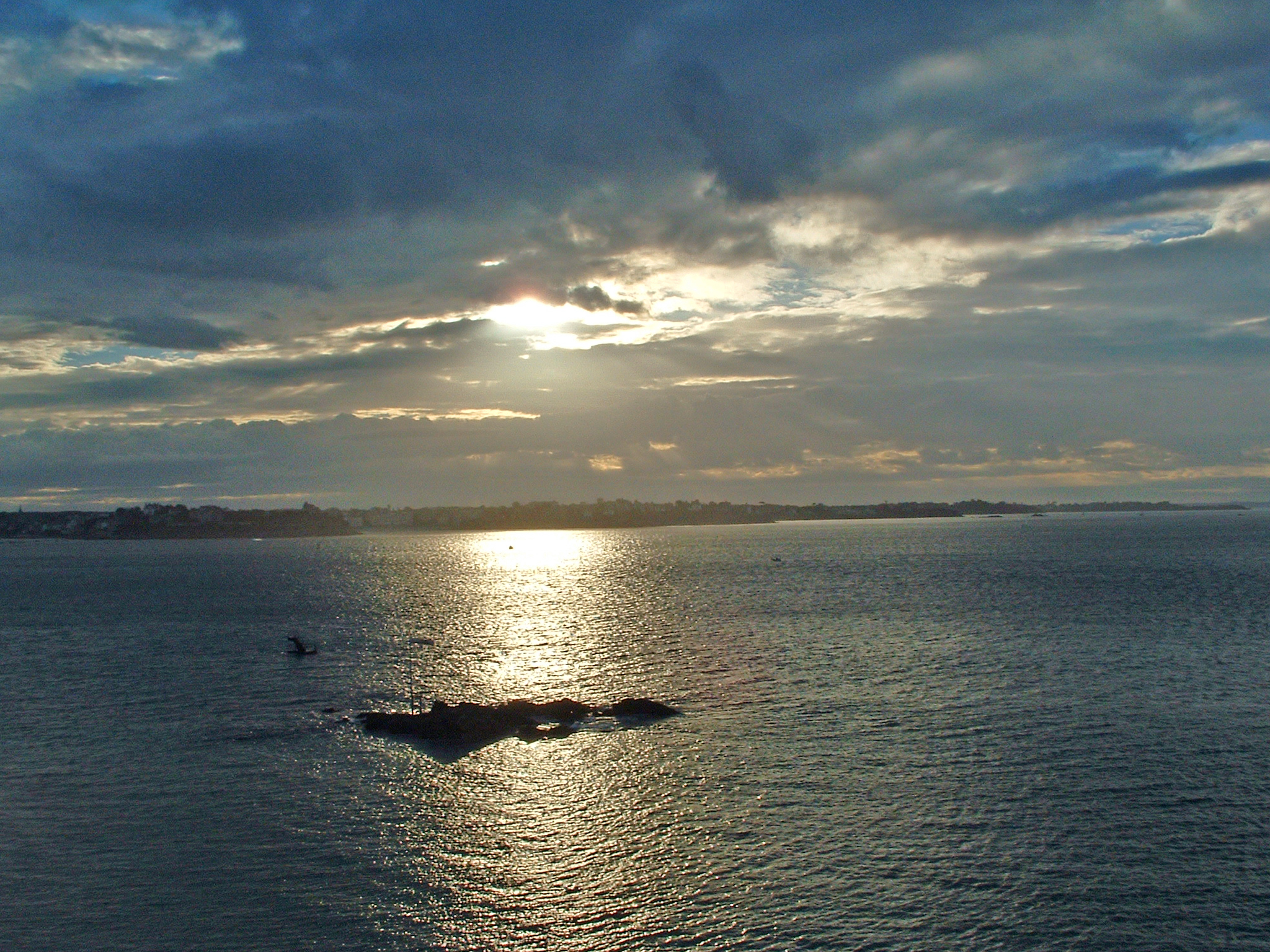
A view of the sea from Saint-Malo

== Synopsis ==
Act I. Eight years ago, Pierre left home at the age of ten to be a pirate. His grandfather Legoëz and cousin Janik—who loves him—have long hoped that he would return.

One day, while only Marie-Anne is in the house, the stranger Jacquemin, who was Pierre's comrade years ago but does not know what has happened to him, stops by to inquire about him, bringing along some of his things. Both he and Marie-Anne are convinced that Pierre perished, and to spare old Legoëz the bad news, she hides Jacquemin, but a misunderstanding occurs when Legoëz enters and notices the bundle of Pierre's things. He discovers the hidden Jacquemin and mistakes him for Pierre. Before any correction can be made, there is rejoicing and dancing.

Act II. At a celebratory feast Jacquemin recounts his adventures; Janik, thinking he is her cousin, is even more in love with him. Legoëz, sensing that the two of them are being shy, asks the guests to leave them alone for a while. With the two of them alone, Jacquemin, who likewise has fallen in love with Janik, tells her the truth. The deception does not matter to her: she loves him, even though he is not the Pierre from her childhood.

Jacquemin leaves Janik alone; her aunt Marie-Anne enters, and the two of them reconcile the deception. At this moment, by a great coincidence, the long-lost Pierre enters and identifies himself. Then Legoëz enters with Jacquemin from outside, and the latter tries to embrace his friend, but Pierre rejects the traitor, and the deception is revealed to Legoëz, who angrily sends Jacquemin away.

Act III. Pierre recounts his adventures with Spanish and English ships, resulting in wealth that allowed him to leave the seafaring life to be a land-dweller. He invites Legoëz to come live in his new country away from the fog of the sea-side. Legoëz feels alienated from Pierre now—they have become so different. Meanwhile, Janik is still in love with the banished Jacquemin, but Legoëz will not hear of it, and there is no joy in the house, despite Pierre's return.

Pierre finds out from Marie-Anne about the accidental nature of the mistaken identity (without knowing of Janik's feelings for Jacquemin, however), and outside on the street he relates this to Legoëz, who decides to forgive Jacquemin. In the meantime, though, Jacquemin drops by the house to bid a reluctant final farewell to Janik and Marie-Anne. Pierre enters and reconciles with Jacquemin. But when it is clear that the latter has Janik's love, Pierre at first is furious, but eventually realizes that a physical contest can make no difference, and so he relents. Legoëz enters, and, after learning what has transpired, consents to his granddaughter's marriage to Jacquemin and leads all in an homage to the sea.

== Bibliography ==
César Cui. Le Flibustier: comédie lyrique in trois actes. Paris: Au Ménestrel, Heugel, 1893.

_______. "Flibustier в Париже (Письмо к редактору)" ["Flibustier in Paris (Letter to the editor)"]. Книжки недели, апр. 1894, pp. 180–198.

_______. У моря (Le Flibustier): лирическая комедия в трех действиях, текст Ж. Ришпена [By the Sea (Le Flibustier): a lyric comedy in three acts, text by J. Richepin]. Москва: А Гутхейль, 1912.
