= Miarka (opera) =

1905 comic opera by Alexandre Georges

Miarka is a 1905 comic opera by Alexandre Georges. Described as a "drame lyrique en 4 actes dont un prologue et 5 tableaux", it tells the story of a Romany girl destined, according to the tarot cards, to become a queen. It premiered at the Opéra-Comique in November 1905, and was later revised for a production at the Opéra. The libretto was by Jean Richepin, adapted from his own 1883 novel Miarka, la fille à l'ourse.

George's music was based on his 1888 song cycle Les chansons de Miarka.
