= Marie-Catherine Girod =

French pianist (born 1949)

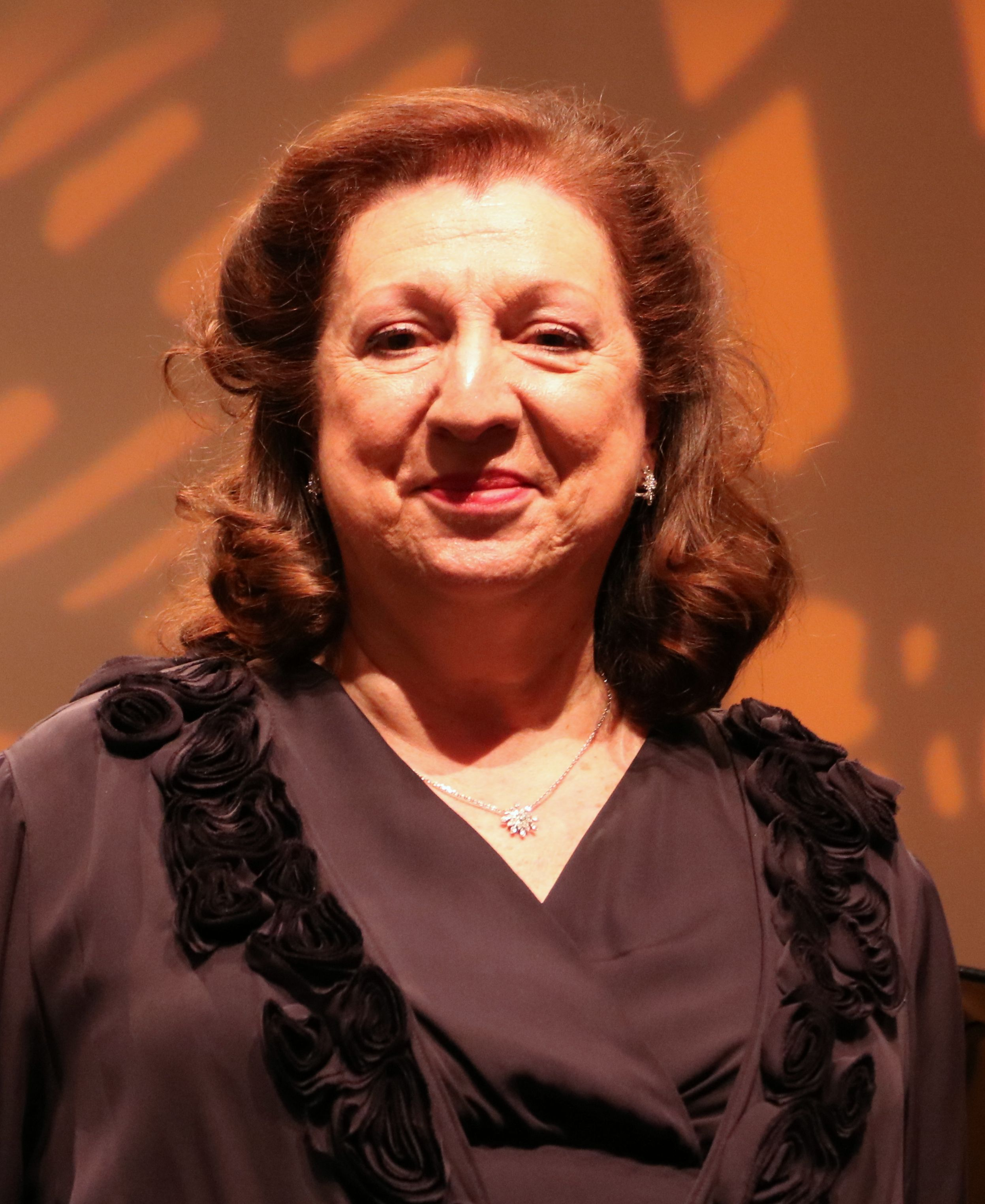
Marie-Catherine Girod at La Folle Journée in 2018 in Nantes

Marie-Catherine Girod (born 19 August 1949) is a French classical pianist known for her work in classical and romantic music. In addition, she also practices as a music teacher.

== Biography ==
Born in Peyrehorade, Girod studied piano at the Conservatoire de musique de Bordeaux, then at the Conservatoire de Paris where she entered Jules Gentil's class. She then worked with Paul Badura-Skoda and György Sebők. She is regularly invited to "Mai" festivals in Bordeaux, La Roque-d'Anthéron, the "Festival Estival de Paris", the "Chopin Festival" of Château de Bagatelle, the Festival de Nohant, the Husum Festival in Germany, the "Alexandre Paley et ses amis" Festival, the "Moulin d’Andé" Festival (Normandy). She performs in recital in Europe and the United States (Richmond Festival in Virginia), in chamber formation and as soloist with various orchestras, including the orchestra of Brittany with which she recorded Paul Le Flem's Fantaisie pour piano et orchestre. She frequently participates in concerts organized by Radio France, and in radio broadcasts.

Girod's recordings of works by Gabriel Dupont, Maurice Emmanuel, André Jolivet, Arthur Lourié and Gustave Samazeuilh are acclaimed by critics, and have won her numerous awards.

In 2009 she completed a recording cycle of the complete piano work by Felix Mendelssohn.

A pedagogue, she directed the Conservatory of Sucy-en-Brie (94) from 1986 to 2012, and created in 1992 the Concours national de piano of Sucy that she organized until 2005. She has been teaching since October 2011 at the École Normale de Musique de Paris.

== Prizes ==
- Grand prix de l’Académie nationale du disque français (piano sonatas: Auric, Dutilleux, Jolivet's 1st piano sonata)
- Grand prix de l’Académie nationale du disque français (Sonatines by Maurice Emmanuel)
- Lauréate du Grand prix International Charles Cros (1991) (Arthur Lourié's works for piano)

== Distinctions ==
- 1991: Chevalier of the Arts et Lettres
- 2011: Officier of the National Order of Merit

== Selected recordings ==
Among many recordings, worth mentioning are:

- Felix Mendelssohn: Complete work for piano (8 CDs), Éditions Saphir
- Sergueï Rachmaninov: 2nd sonata Op.36, 6 moments musicaux Op.16, Éditions Solstice
- Carl Maria von Weber: the four sonatas for piano, Éditions Solstice
- York Bowen: 24 Preludes, Nocturnes, Op.78, Rêveries Op.86, Éditions 3DClassics
- Louis Aubert / Abel Decaux and others: Sillages / Clairs de lune / Tombeau de Claude Debussy, Éditions 3DClassics
- Gabriel Dupont / Gustave Samazeuilh: La Maison dans les dunes / Le chant de la mer, Éditions 3DClassics
- Pierre-Octave Ferroud: Complete piano music (world premiere recording) Éditions 3DClassics
- Paul Le Flem:
1. Fantaisie pour piano et orchestre (+ La Magicienne de la mer, Symphonie n°1), Orchestre National de Bretagne, dir. Claude Schnitzler, Éditions Timpani
2. Works for piano, works for piano and violin, Annick Roussin, violin, Éditions Accord
