= Jean Richepin =

French poet, novelist and dramatist (1849–1926)

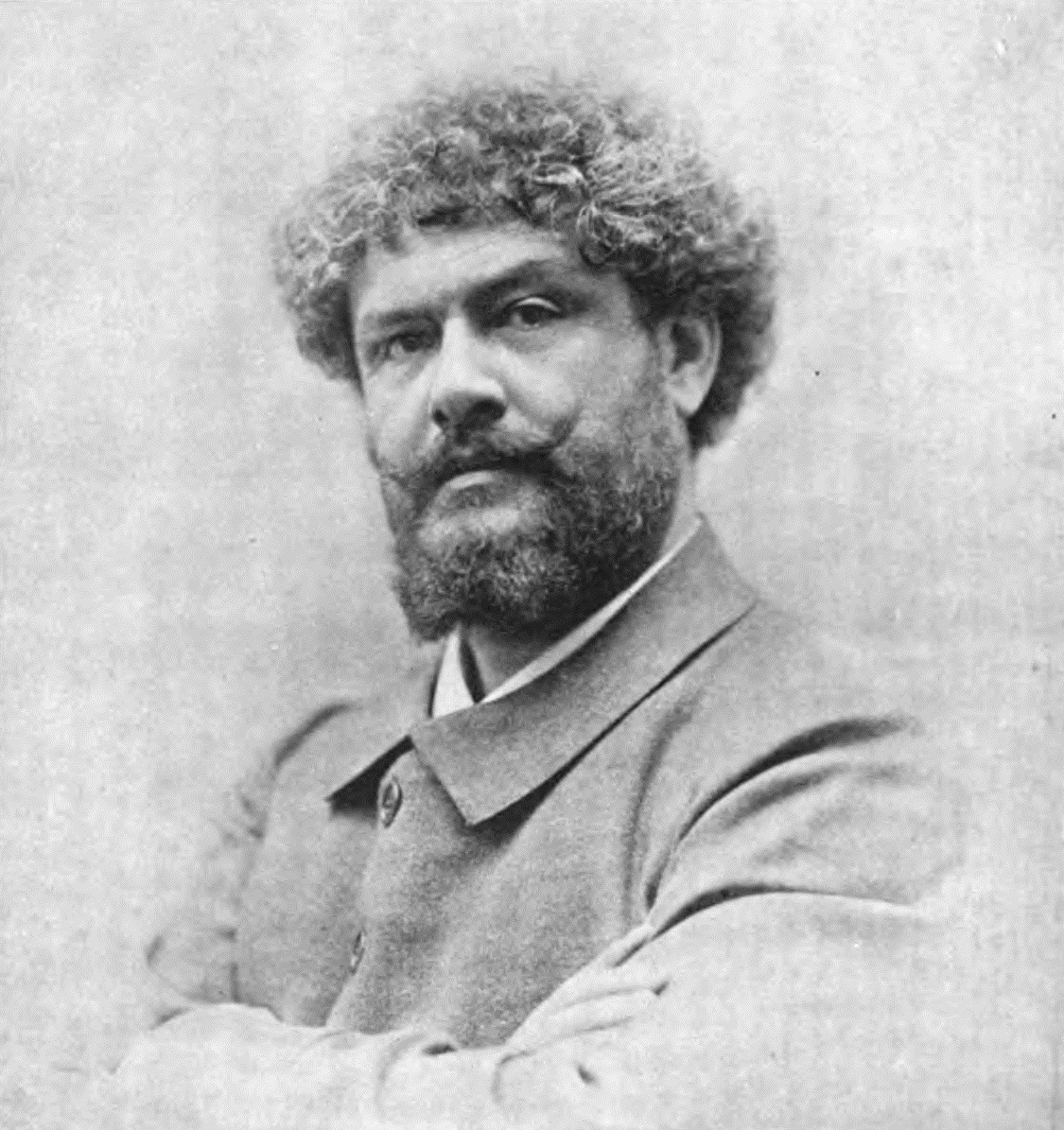
- Born: 4 February 1849; Médéa, French Algeria
- Died: 12 December 1926 (aged 77); Paris, France
- Occupations: Poet, novelist and dramatist

Signature
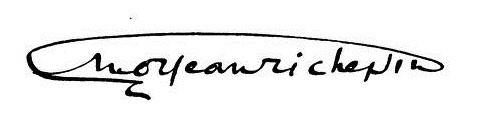

Jean Richepin (French pronunciation: [ʒɑ̃ ʁiʃpɛ̃]; 4 February 1849 – 12 December 1926) was a French poet, novelist and dramatist.

== Biography ==
Born on 4 February 1849 at Médéa, French Algeria, Jean Richepin was the son of an army doctor.

At school and at the École Normale Supérieure he gave evidence of brilliant, if somewhat undisciplined, powers, for which he found physical vent in different directions—first as a franc-tireur in the Franco-German War, and afterwards as actor, sailor and stevedore—and an intellectual outlet in the writing of poems, plays and novels which vividly reflected his erratic but unmistakable talent. A play, L'Étoile, written by him in collaboration with André Gill (1840–1885), was produced in 1873; but Richepin was virtually unknown until the publication, in 1876, of a volume of verse entitled La Chanson des gueux, a declaration of war against the bourgeoisie, according to Jacques Cellard: Richepin's outspokenness resulted in his being imprisoned and fined for outrage aux mœurs. The collection was republished, without the contentious pieces, which were published separately in Brussels in 1881.

The same quality characterized his succeeding volumes of verse: Les Caresses (1877), Les Blasphèmes (1884), La Mer (1886), Mes paradis (1894), La Bombarde (1899). His novels have developed in style from the morbidity and brutality of Les morts bizarres (1876), La Glu (1881) and Le Pavé (1883) to the more thoughtful psychology of Madame André (1878), Sophie Monnier (1884), Cisarine (1888), L'Aîné (1893), Grandes amoureuses (1896) and La Gibasse (1899), and the more simple portrayal of life in Miarka (1883), Les Braves Gens (1886), Truandailles (1890), La Miseloque (1892) and Flamboche (1895).

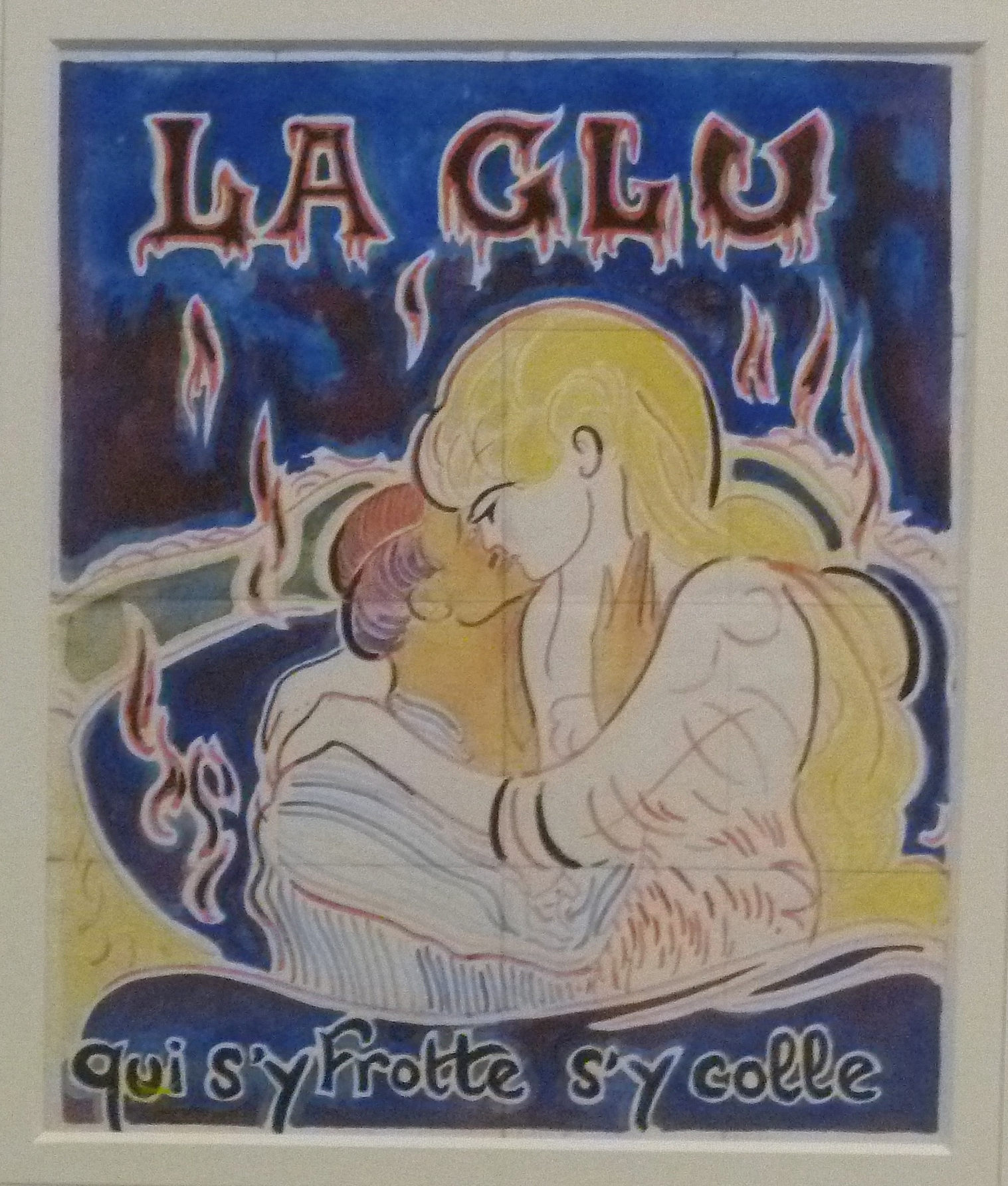
(not-executed) playbill by Léon Spilliaert (1917)

His plays, though occasionally marred by his characteristic propensity for dramatic violence of thought and language, constitute in many respects his best work. Most of these were produced at the Comédie française. During the 1880s he had an affair with Sarah Bernhardt, the greatest actress of the time.

Richepin and Arthur Rimbaud met in 1871 and seem to have formed a friendly relationship : it is through him, in any case, that the manuscripts of Fêtes de la patience (including notably 'Chanson de la plus haute Tour') have reached us. Also, Richepin was one of only "seven known recipients" of the first edition of A Season in Hell. They remained in correspondence at least until 1874.

On 14 June 1913 a banquet, the Ligue des Gourmands, Xeme Diner d’Epicure was held at the Hyde Park Hotel in London. The menu was designed and a toast given by August Escoffier, the league's founder and at the time co-president with Richepin.

Richepin won three prizes awarded by the Académie française: the Prix Toirac for the best comedy in verse or prose performed at the Théâtre Français during the previous year), in 1893, for Par le glaive, and again, in 1906, for Don Quichotte. He also won the Prix Émile-Augier (awarded to the author of a dramatic work), in 1899, for Le Chemineau. He was elected to the Académie française on 5 March 1908, winning the chair over Henri de Régnier, who was also proposed. Richepin was also Commander of the Legion of Honour.

A commemorative plaque pays tribute to him at 85, rue de la Tour, Paris, on the façade of the building where he died.

His son Jacques Richepin was also a dramatist; one of Jean Richepin's favourite composers, Xavier Leroux, composed incidental music for Jacques Richepin's comedy Xantho chez les courtisanes. His other son, Tiarko Richepin, a composer of operettas and film music.

In an interview recorded in 1942 Tiarko said: "My grandfather, Jules Richepin, was a military doctor. Unfortunately, I didn't know him very well. My grandmother followed her husband to the garrisons, so it was by chance that my father was born in Médéa, Algeria. Let's delve a little deeper into the past. My father was an extraordinary storyteller. He had the whole of Paris and many foreigners flocking to his famous Annales lectures. He was received with great respect in the courts of Europe. He was friends with Queen Elisabeth of Romania, also known as Carmen Sylva. He admired her poetry and visited her often. Returning from his lecture tours, he would bring back decorations, modestly stored in a trunk, because my father was simplicity itself. He spoke verse admirably, like a professional actor. In 1884 [In fact 1883], he performed her drama, Nana-Sahib, alongside the legendary Sarah Bernhardt. With a prodigious memory, he could recite thousands of verses by heart. Later, the French Academy opened its doors wide to him." (RTF, 1942)

Tiarko is perhaps overly eulogistic—cultivating a legend seems to be a trait he shares with his father, though his father crafted the legend around himself. He spread self-serving rumours after he was expelled from the École normale supérieure, probably for cheating. One rumour claimed he had been caught one night in the chapel of the École normale, in the company of three women. This fabricated achievement was intended to obscure his real fault. A second rumour suggested that the day after his expulsion, he set up a stall opposite the École normale supérieure, selling chestnuts - or possibly chips - and displayed a sign reading: 'Jean Richepin, former student of the École normale, chestnut seller'). This was another lie designed to undermine those who expelled him and mock them. He later used manipulative lies to draw attention to himself and gain fame (for want of being recognized as a great writer), particularly when he was about to publish a new book. The newspapers sometimes criticized him severely: 'As soon as the news of Jean Richepin's madness broke along the boulevard, everyone exclaimed with a smile: 'This Richepin, what a clever fellow!' It never occurred to anyone — even those unfamiliar with his cold, calculating nature — that M. Richepin might really be mad; on the contrary, everyone thought that it was M. Richepin himself who, with the complaisance of a friend — the poet Ponchon, perhaps — who was spreading the rumour of his sudden madness through the cafés. People especially admired the ingenious staging, completely new, which seemed to have been planned by M. Duquesnel, of this gripping drama: the Trappists refusing to open the door of their cloister to the author of Blasphèmes, the unhappy wife setting off in pursuit of the desperate man, and the latter, filth on his body, revolt in his soul, sinking into the desert, the mysterious desert from which no one has returned, and where he was already represented to us, loved by panthers, taming lions and raising up wandering peoples.' (First paragraph of a long and delightful article by Octave Mirbeau published on the front page of the newspaper Le Gaulois, 8 December 1884 Justine Richard suspects that this lie was invented in collaboration with Sarah Bernhardt, whom the actor Paul Mounet introduced to Richepin in 1882, and who became her lover.

== Richepin and composers ==
Richepin adapted a libretto from his 1883 novel Miarka la fille à l'ours for Alexandre Georges' opera Miarka (Paris, 1905), and Le mage (1891) for the music of Jules Massenet (Paris, 1891). Le Flibustier was made into an opera by César Cui (1888). Richepin adapted from his play Le Chemineau a libretto for Le Chemineau (opéra), a lyric drama composed by Xavier Leroux, and premiered in Paris in 1907. Also for Leroux, he wrote the libretto for Le Carillonneur, based on the novel by Georges Rodenbach (Opéra-Comique, 20 March 1913. Still for the same composer, he composed the libretto for La plus forte in collaboration with Paul de Choudens. The ballet L'Impératrice by Paul Vidal is based on a text by Richepin (Paris, 1901) who also wrote the lyrics for his friend Emmanuel Chabrier's concert "scène lyrique" La Sulamite and helped with the libretto of Le roi malgré lui. His novel La Glu was the basis for two other operas, one by Gabriel Dupont (1910) and one by Camille Erlanger. Another work he collaborated on is "Soléa", a lyric drama in four acts and five tableaux, with poetry and music by Isidore de Lara, versified into French by Jean Richepin (Cologne, 19 December 1907). Composer Dagmar de Corval Rybner used Richepin's text for her song "Te Souvient-il", as did composer Jeanne Rivet for her song "Le Bateau Rose." Mam'selle Napoléon is a musical comedy by Joseph W. Herbert based on a play by Jean Richepin, with music by Gustav Luders, which opened at the Knickerbocker Theater in New York, 8 December 1903, starring Ann Held.

There are over 100 poems by Jean Richepin which have inspired a large number of musicians. Forty poems from "Les Caresses" attracted the attention of composers such as César Cui, Gabriel Dupont, Louis Vierne, Auguste Chapuis, Alfred Bruneau, Camille Erlanger, Nikolay Sokolov, Paul Hillemacher and his brother, Georges Hüe, André Messager, Florent Schmitt, Paul Puget, Ernest Garnier, Edmond Missa ('Du mouron pour les p'tits oiseaux') and Ernest Moret. 'Le bateau rose' was his most popular poem with composers, set to music more than ten times, including by Paul Lacôme : the song was titled 'Je m'embarquerai, si tu le veux' (Lacôme also set "Vieilles amourettes" as "Aux prés de l'enfance on cueille") There are several translations of ' Où vivre ? Dans quelle ombre ?' that have been set to music : one in Italian for Casella, and two translations in Russian, one for Cui and the other one (Где жить?) for Mikhail Ippolitov-Ivanov, for his opus 22.

Over 20 poems from "La Mer" garnered significant interest, particularly for "Larmes" (Pleurons nos chagrins, chacun le nôtre) with 8 different settings, including those by Marie Jaëll, André Caplet, Ange Flégier, Cui, Fauré, Alfredo Casella.

Sixteen poems from La chanson des gueux have been the sources for melodies by Désiré Dihau, Cui, Marguerite Roesgen-Champion, etc. "Miarka la fille à l'ours" particularly inspired Alexandre Georges, while also inspiring two works by Ernest Chausson or Arthur Honegger, and one by Frederick Delius.

Only two poems from La bombarde, contes à chanter have retained the attention of composers : 'Trois petits oiseaux dans les blés' (Gabriel Pierné, Marcel Samuel-Rousseau) and 'Les deux ménétriers' (Cécile Chaminade, Cui, Robert Dussaut - as well as Edith Piaf). There are also six settings of 'La Chanson de la Glu' (Y avait un' fois un pauv' gas) from the novel La Glu (Auguste Chapuis, Georges Fragerolle, Charles Gounod, Joseph Jongen, and others), two poems from Par le Glaive, one set by Ethelbert Nevin and the other one by Richepin himself (who also composed music for 'Les trois bateaux' from Les Truands). Louis Vierne composed on 'Les roses blanches de la lune' (from Les Glas, Poèmes); Max Arham and Ange Flégier on 'La requête aux étoiles' and César Cui and Ernest Moret on 'Si mon rival' (all three poems from Les Blasphèmes, as well as 'Le Hun' by Georges Alary (Chœurs sans accompagnement, op. 37), and Alfred Bruneau on ' Ohé! la belle, en vous levant' (from Interludes). One poem from Mes Paradis was also set to music. Octave Fouque composed the melody 'Rêve !' on a poem by Richepin.

More recently, 'Les deux ménétriers' was sung by Damia, Line Marsa as well as Piaf. Singer-songwriter Georges Brassens sang two poems from La Chanson des gueux: 'Les oiseaux de passage' and 'Philistins' (Richepin's title was 'Chanson des cloches de Baptême'). Rémo Gary has released a double CD-book, Même pas foutus d'être heureux : the second CD contains 15 songs based on poems by Richepin taken from La Chanson des Gueux, Mes Paradis, La Mer... - and one by his friend Raoul Ponchon : 'Vive l’eau', from La Muse au cabaret.

== Bibliography ==
- La Glu (1881, novel) was made into a silent film, La Glu (1913), by Henry Krauss.
- Nana Sahib (1883, play), with incidental music by Massenet.
- Monsieur Scapin (1886, play)
- Le Flibustier (1888, play; the basis for an opera of the same name by César Cui)
- Par le glaive (1892, play)
- Vers la joie (1894, play)
- Le Chemineau (1897, play) was made into a (silent) film by Henry Krauss, Le chemineau or A Vagabond of France (1917) and again by Fernand Rivers (1995), with music by Tiarko Richepin (1884-1973). This play was also performed in London and New York, first as Ragged Robin, adapted by Louis N. Parker, at Her Majesty's Theatre (London, 1898) with Charles Warner; and in New York, as The Harvester : A Drama of the Fields, adapted by Charles Montgomery Skinner, at the Lyric Theatre (1904) with Otis Skinner.
- Le Chien de garde (1898, play)
- Les Truands (1899, play)
- Don Quichotte (1905, play)
- L'Aile, Roman des Temps Nouveaux (1911) translated as The Wing by Brian Stableford (2011) ISBN 978-1-61227-053-1
- Mères Françaises (1917, film, translated as Mothers of France), scenario for the war film directed by Louis Mercanton, starring Sarah Bernhardt
- Nouvelle Mythologie Illustree, Tome I & II (1920)
- Le Coin des Fous (1921) translated as The Crazy Corner by Brian Stableford (2013) ISBN 978-1-61227-142-2
