= Guy Sacre =

French composer, pianist and musical critic

Guy Sacre (born 1948) is a French composer, pianist and musical critic.

== Biography ==
He is best known for writing La Musique de piano, a critical census of a large part of the piano repertoire, dealing with some 4,000 works by 272 composers.

In his compositions, Guy Sacre tries to reconnect with the French musical tradition: he is the author of Vingt-Quatre préludes and Mélodies after poems by Paul Verlaine, Jean Cocteau and Guillaume Apollinaire.

With Billy Eidi he created the association "Contrechants" intended to rediscover an unknown repertoire ("Piano au Palais-Royal" concerts from 1991 to 1995, in collaboration with the Bibliothèque nationale).

Guy Sacre is also author of radio broadcasts (Radio Suisse Romande) and conferences centered on themes of musical and literary aesthetics, such as "la musique et les éléments", "Vigny et le silence", "Apollinaire poète du souvenir", and the "masques et bergamasques" which gather Fauré and Debussy around Verlaine and Watteau.

== Critical works ==
- La Musique de piano, Paris, éditions Robert Laffont, series "Bouquins" (2 volumes), 1998

== Compositions ==
Non-exhaustive list (to be completed)

=== Works for piano ===
- 1982: Thème varié
- 1979: Piccolissima-Sérénade
- 1981–1982 : Deuxième Sérénade
- 1989: Variations sur une mazurka de Chopin
- 1993: 24 Préludes
- Chansons enfantines

=== Vocal music ===
- 1976: Cartes postales (on 4 poems by Jean Cocteau)
- 1980–1982: Clair-Obscur for baritone and piano (on 4 poems by Jean Cocteau)
- 1982: L'Exécution for baritone and piano (on 1 poem by Jean Cocteau)
- 1978–1982: Six poèmes de "Vocabulaire" for voice and piano (on 6 poems by Jean Cocteau)
- 1986–1990: "L'Album de Poil de Carotte" for voice and piano (on 9 texts by Jules Renard)
- Cinq Poésies de Georges Schehadé
- Cinq Poèmes de Guillaume Apollinaire
- Sept Phrases pour Éventails
- Six Nouveaux Éventails
- Trois Poèmes de Verlaine
- Trois Poèmes de Robert Desnos
- Quatre Exemples tirés des "Nécessités de la vie"
- Trois Poésies de Georges Schehadé
- Mauvais Cœur

== Discography ==
- Mélodies and Mélodies - 2, performed by Jean-François Gardeil, Florence Katz and Billy Eidi on the Timpani label.
- Œuvres pour piano and Œuvres pour piano - 2, performed by Billy Eidi on the same label.
