= Jean-Paul Fouchécourt =

French opera singer

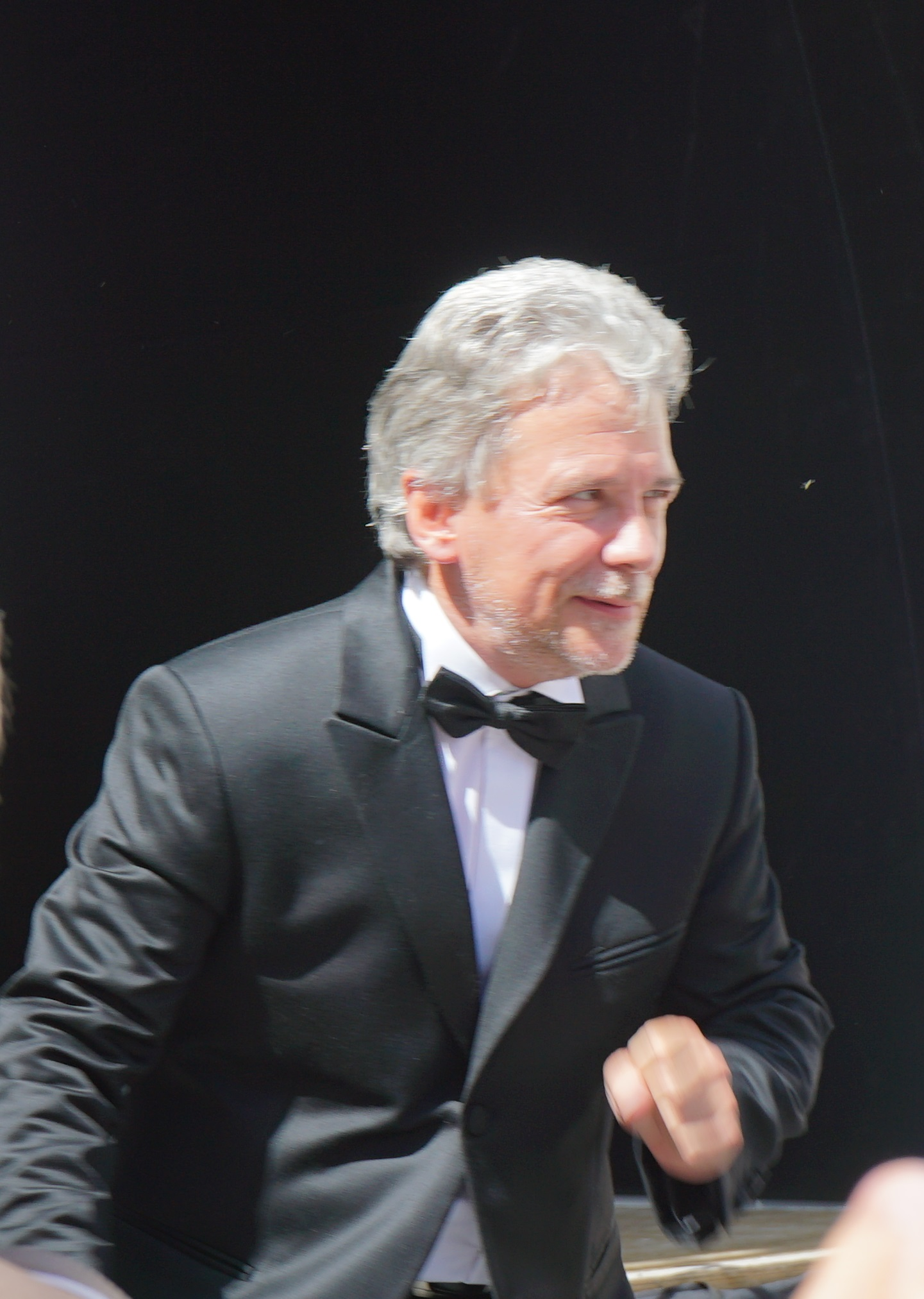
2015

Jean-Paul Fouchécourt is a French tenor, mostly as an opera singer. He was born on 30 August 1958 at Blanzy in the Burgundy region. He is best known for singing French Baroque music, especially the parts called in French haute-contre, written for a very high tenor voice with no falsetto singing.

== Life and career ==
Specialist in French Baroque repertory, Jean-Paul Fouchécourt gained his reputation with his portrayal of the title role Platée by Rameau, Arnalta in l’Incoronazione di Poppea by Monteverdi, the four servants in the Tales of Hoffmann by Offenbach and le Mari in the Mamelles de Tirésias by Poulenc.

After studying the classical saxophone and conducting, Jean-Paul Fouchécourt decided to become a singer after a workshop with Cathy Berberian in 1982. He began his career with Les Arts Florissants directed by William Christie in 1986, having concerts in Europe, US, Soviet Union, South America, Australia and Japan. Jean-Paul Fouchécourt then went on to work with the conductor Marc Minkowski and his Musiciens du Louvre: highlights of his career in the Baroque repertory include the title roles of Hippolyte et Aricie by Rameau, Titon et l’Aurore by Mondonville, Acis et Galatée by Lully and Resurrezione by Handel. He has also collaborated with other Baroque ensembles.

Fouchécourt has performed with many of the world’s leading opera companies, including Royal Opera House - London, Metropolitan Opera, New York City Opera, Cincinnati Opera, Opéra Bastille, Théâtre des Champs-Élysées, Théâtre du Châtelet in Paris, Grand Théâtre de Bordeaux, Opéra National de Lyon, Opéra national du Rhin, and Opéra national de Montpellier, La Monnaie, Vlaams Opera, Grand Théâtre de Genève, Lausanne Opera and Zürich Opera, Dutch National Opera, Theater an der Wien, Israeli Opera and Opera Australia.

His operatic productions have included L'enfant et les sortilèges and L'heure Espagnole (Torquemada) by Ravel, Le Nozze di Figaro (Basilio) by Mozart, Orphée aux Enfers (Pluton) by Offenbach, Falstaff (Bardolfo) by Verdi, Manon (Guillot de Morfontaine) by Massenet, Madame Butterfly (Goro) by Puccini, Eugene Onegin (Monsieur Triquet) by Tchaikovsky, L'étoile (Ouf 1er) by Chabrier, Calisto (Pane) by Cavalli, and The Golden Cockerel (The astrologer) by Rimsky-Korsakov.

Jean-Paul Fouchécourt has also performed at music festivals including Aix-en-Provence, Chorégies d'Orange (France), Berkley (USA), Saito Kinen (Japan), BBC Proms, Edinburgh (UK), and Salzburg (Austria).

His discography of more than 100 recordings includes works from Monteverdi, Mondonville, Rameau, Fauré, Bizet, Boulanger, Delage, Poulenc, Offenbach, Ravel, and Rosenthal to Szymanowski.

In 2000, Jean-Paul Fouchécourt was honoured with the 'Chevalier de l’ordre National du Mérite' by the French Government.

He became the artistic director of the Studio de l’Opéra de Lyon (SOL) in 2011.

== Selected recordings ==
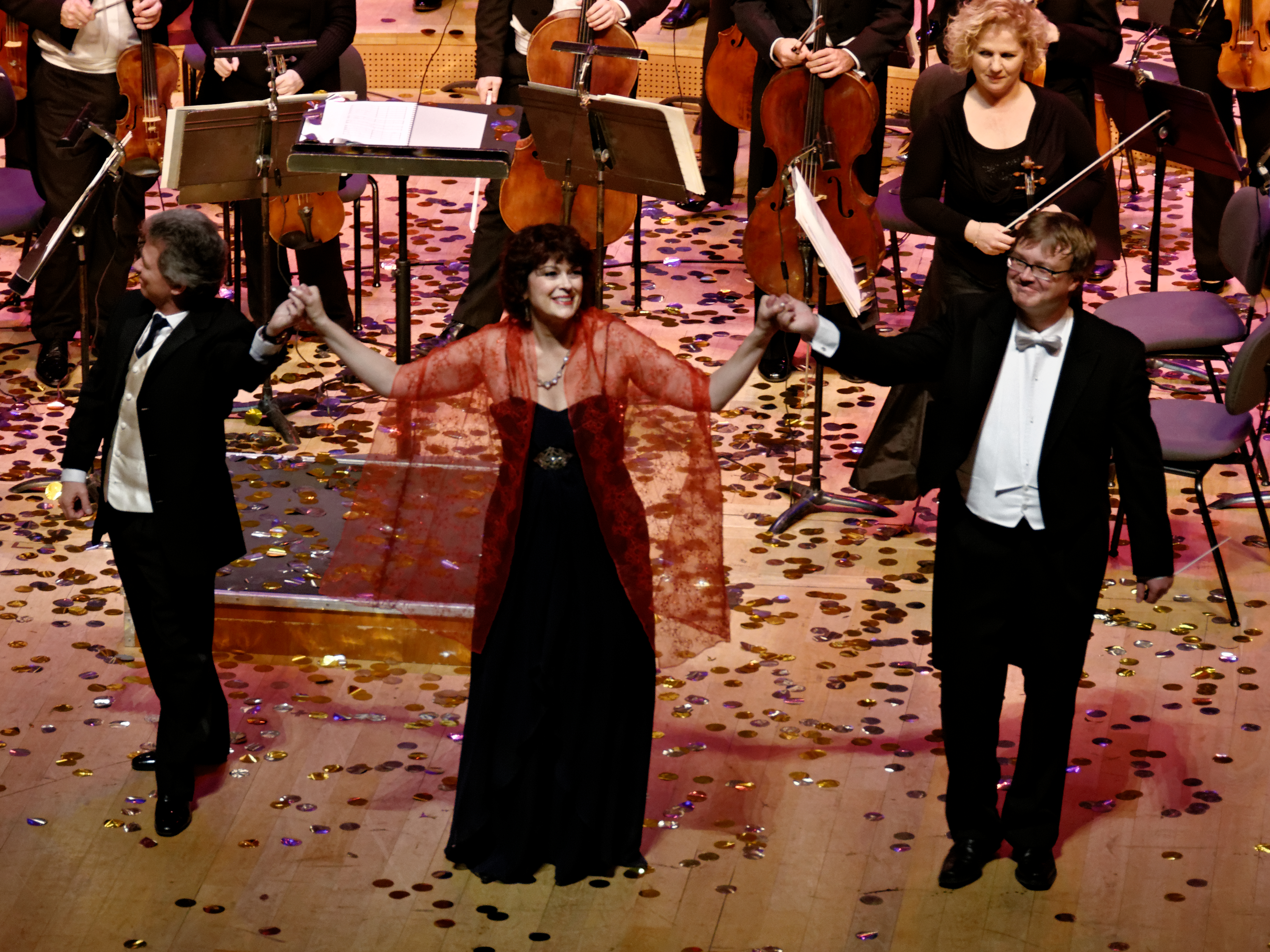
Jean-Paul Fouchécourt, Jennifer Larmore, Philippe Bach.

Solo recitals

- Rameau: Operatic Arias. Opera Lafayette Orchestra, Ryan Brown
- Airs de Cour des XVI, XVII, XVIII Siecles. Éric Bellocq

Among the many Baroque operas and vocal pieces that Fouchécourt has recorded are:

- Atys by Jean-Baptist Lully, conducted by William Christie (1987) Harmonia Mundi
- David et Jonathas by Marc-Antoine Charpentier, conducted by William Christie (1988) Harmonia Mundi
- The Fairy-Queen by Purcell, conducted by William Christie (1989) Harmonia Mundi
- Alcyone by Marin Marais, conducted by Marc Minkowski (1990) Erato
- Te Deum by De Lalande, conducted by William Christie (1991) Harmonia Mundi
- Titon et l'Aurore by Jean-Joseph Cassanéa de Mondonville, conducted by Marc Minkowski (1992) Erato
- Les amours de Ragonde by Jean-Joseph Mouret, conducted by Marc Minkowski (1992) Erato
- Les Indes Galantes by Jean-Philippe Rameau, conducted by William Christie (1992) Harmonia Mundi
- Idoménée by André Campra, conducted by William Christie (1992) Harmonia Mundi
- Te Deum by Marc-Antoine Charpentier, conducted by William Christie (1992) Harmonia Mundi
- Pigmalion by Rameau, conducted by Hervé Niquet (1993) Fnac / re-release from Virgin Classics/EMI (1999)
- Phaëton by Lully, conducted by Marc Minkowski (1993) Erato
- Hippolyte et Aricie by Rameau, conducted by Marc Minkowski (1994) Archiv
- Dido and Aeneas by Purcell, conducted by William Christie (1995) Erato
- Les Fêtes de Paphos by Mondonville, conducted by Christophe Rousset (1997) L'Oiseau-Lyre
- Les Fêtes d'Hébé by Rameau, conducted by William Christie (1998) Erato
- Acis & Galatée by Lully, conducted by Marc Minkowski (1998) Archiv
- Orphée et Euridice (1774 Paris version) by Gluck, conducted by Ryan Brown (2005) Naxos

Other recordings include:

- La cambiale di matrimonio by Gioachino Rossini, conducted by Hervé Niquet (1991) ADDA
- La dame blanche by Boïeldieu, conducted by Marc Minkowski (1996) EMI Classics/Angel
- Les mamelles de Tirésias by Francis Poulenc, conducted by Seiji Ozawa (1999) Philips
- Orphée aux enfers by Offenbach conducted by Marc Minkowski (1998) EMI
- Roméo & Juliette by Berlioz, conducted by John Eliot Gardiner (1998) Polygram
- Maurice Delage: Mélodies, with Billy Eidi (1998) Timpani
- Werther by Massenet, conducted by Antonio Pappano (1999) EMI Classics
- Herodiade by Massenet conducted by Michel Plasson (2001) EMI Classics
- Rodrigue et Chimène by Debussy conducted by Kent Nagano (1993–94) Erato
- Songs by Fauré - Aubade, Chanson d'amour, Les présents, Lydia, Mai, Nell, with Graham Johnson (2005) Hyperion
- La Vie Parisienne by Offenbach, conducted by Sébastien Rouland (2008, DVD) Virgin Classics
- L'enfant et les sortilèges by Ravel, conducted by Simon Rattle (2009) EMI Classics
- Enoch Arden, melodrama by Richard Strauss, with Christian Ivaldi, piano

Carmen by Bizet, conducted by Antonio Pappano (2004) DVD Carmen by Bizet, conducted by Simon Rattle EMI (2012) Eugène Onguin byTchaikowsky conducted by Valery Gergiev (2007) DECA DVD

Saxophone

- Works by Creston, Pierné, Schmitt recorded in 1981, 1984.
