= Charles Tournemire =

French composer and organist (1870–1939)

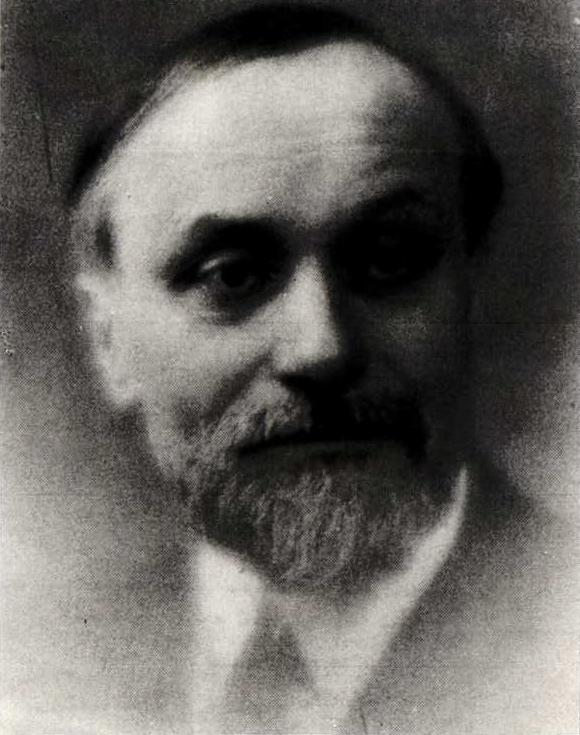
Charles Tournemire, 1910

Charles Arnould Tournemire (22 January 1870 – 3 or 4 November 1939) was a French composer and organist, notable partly for his improvisations, which were often rooted in the music of Gregorian chant. His compositions include eight symphonies (one of them choral), four operas, twelve chamber works and eighteen piano solos. He is mainly remembered for his organ music, the best known being a set of pieces called L'Orgue mystique.

== Biography ==
Born in Bordeaux, Tournemire moved in adolescence to Paris, and there became one of César Franck's three youngest students (the other two were Henri Büsser and a Belgian, Guillaume Lekeu, the latter having been born only two days before Tournemire).

From 1898 (on the resignation of Gabriel Pierné) to 1939, Tournemire served as the organiste titulaire at Franck's old church, the Basilique Ste-Clotilde, Paris. He was also professor of chamber music at the Paris Conservatoire. In 1931, he published a biography of Franck.

A year before the biography appeared, Tournemire recorded five organ improvisations, which were later transcribed by Maurice Duruflé from phonograph recordings. Of ten 78-rpm discs which Tournemire made in 1930, playing the Aristide Cavaillé-Coll organ of Sainte-Clotilde, five contain compositions by Franck. This set of discs was awarded the Grand Prix du Disque in 1931 and has been reissued on both LP and CD.

Insofar as Tournemire's name is now remembered, it is usually spoken of in connection with his largest composition, L'Orgue mystique, a group of 51 sets of five pieces each (except for Holy Saturday, which contains only three pieces), all written between 1927 and 1932. This collection covers the cycle of the Roman Catholic liturgical year, each set being based on the Gregorian chants for the day. Unlike the symphonies of Charles-Marie Widor, which are usually heard in secular recitals (even when individual movements of these symphonies had liturgical origins), L'Orgue mystique was designed for church use.

Tournemire died in Arcachon, France, in 1939. The precise cause of his death is uncertain. All that is known is he left his house on October 31 for a walk and never returned. His body was found in a bog in Arcachon, a fair distance from where he left, on November 4 and he was presumed to have died on November 3 or 4.

A rare revival of one of his four operas took place in December 2022, when Theater Ulm staged La Légende de Tristan (based on Le Roman de Tristan et Iseut by Joseph Bédier) conducted by Felix Bender. In May 2025 Theater Ulm staged his last opera, Le petit pauvre d'Assisi.
