= Brigitte Balleys =

Swiss mezzo-soprano in opera and concert

Brigitte Balleys (born 18 June 1959) is a Swiss mezzo-soprano in opera and concert.

== Biography ==
Born in the canton of Vaud, Brigitte Balleys studied at Sion, then at the Conservatory of Bern where she graduated from the singing class of Jakob Stämpfli and also improved her skills with Elisabeth Schwarzkopf.

She made her debut as a singer in 1982, on the stage of the opera and in 1985, at Fribourg-en-Brisgau. In 1987, she performed the role of Cherubino in Mozart's Le nozze di Figaro, conducted by Erich Leinsdorf, then in his Die Zauberflöte at the Wiener Staatsoper. Subsequently, she appeared in the title role Bizet's Carmen, as Zerlina in Mozart's Don Giovanni, as Dorabella in his Così fan tutte, The title role of Der Rosenkavalier by Richard Strauss, as well as in L'incoronazione di Poppea by Claudio Monteverdi, Brigitte Balleys's favorite composer. She has collaborated with conductors such as Claudio Abbado, Charles Dutoit, Jesús López Cobos, Vladimir Ashkenazy, Philippe Herreweghe and Fabio Luisi.

Balleys is even better known as interpreter of the repertory of the mélodie and the lied. Her many recordings include songs by Robert Schumann, Ernest Chausson, Charles Martin Loeffler, Mel Bonis, Arthur Honegger and compositions for voice and orchestra by Hector Berlioz, Giuseppe Martucci, Ottorino Respighi and Ernest Bloch.

Balleys teaches voice in Sion, Friburg and Lausanne. Among her students is Capucine Keller.
