= Quatre poèmes, Op. 8 (Roussel) =

Song cycle composed by Albert Roussel

Quatre poèmes
- by Albert Roussel
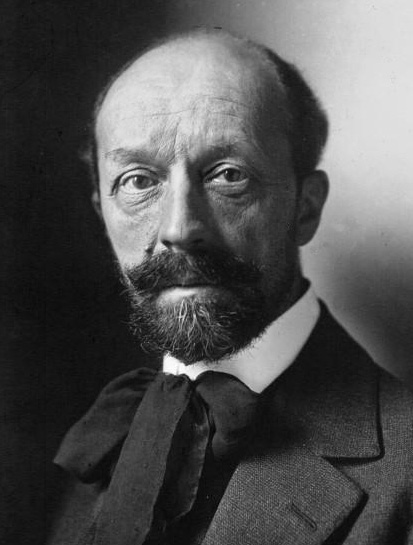
- The composer
- Catalogue: L. 9
- Opus: Op. 8
- Year: 1907
- Text: Henri de Regnier
- Language: French
- Published: 1908 – Paris
- Publisher: Rouart, Lerolle & Cie. (Éditions Salabert)
- Movements: 4
- Scoring: Voice and piano

Premiere
- Date: January 11, 1908; 118 years ago
- Location: Salle Érard, Paris, France
- Performers: Jane Bathori (soprano); Albert Roussel (piano)

Quatre poèmes, Op. 8, L. 9 (from French, Four Poems) is the second song cycle composed by French composer Albert Roussel. Completed in 1907, it is sometimes twinned with his previous song cycle, Quatre poèmes, Op. 3 (1903).

== Background ==
The composition was written in Paris during the first months of 1907. "Adieux" (No. I) was completed at an unspecified date in February, while "Nuit d’automne" (No. III) was finished on February 19. "Odelette" (No. IV) was completed on April 27, and the final piece to be finished was "Invocation" (No. II), completed on May 4. Each one of the four poems was dedicated to a notable person. "Adieux" was dedicated to Paul Poujaud, a French lawyer and artistic socialité. "Invocation" was premiered by Jane Bathori, a French mezzo-soprano that premiered both this composition and Quatre poèmes, Op. 3 (1903). "Nuit d'automne" was dedicated to Pierre-Émile Engel, a famous French tenor and teacher of Bathori. Finally, "Odelette" was dedicated to Octave Maus, a Belgian art critic.

Unlike his previous song cycle based on Henri de Régnier, the textual sources of this composition are somewhat more varied. The poem "Adieux" is taken from Les médailles d'argile (1900), "Invocation" from La sandale ailée (1906), and both "Nuit d’automne" and "Odelette" from Les jeux rustiques et divins (1897). All the manuscripts are preserved at the Bibliothèque nationale de France, except for that of "Adieux." This manuscript was donated to Yvonne Gouverné by Blanche Roussel, the widow of Albert Roussel, after the composer's death. However, it was not found among Gouverné’s archives following her death.

The premiere took place at the Salle Érard in Paris, at a concert of the Société nationale de musique, on January 11, 1908. The first performance was given by soprano Jane Bathori, who had also premiered Quatre poèmes, Op. 3 (1903), this time with Roussel himself at the piano. The work was later published in Paris by Rouart, Lerolle & Cie. in 1908, in a French edition with English translations provided by Rosa Newmarch. It is nowadays reissued by Éditions Salabert.

Roussel also made an arrangement of "Adieux" for voice and orchestra. The circumstances of its origin remain unclear, though it appears to have been written at the suggestion of the singer who premiered the piece, Jane Bathori. Roussel began working on the orchestration while serving in the French army during World War I. On two occasions, February 18 and April 7, 1916, he noted that he was "getting his hand back in" and beginning to orchestrate "Adieux". In a letter to Georges Jean-Aubry dated March 13, 1918, the composer wrote that he had "accepted the idea and even made a sketch while with the army. Then, after reflection, [I] abandoned the idea."

Despite this statement, an eighteen-page orchestral arrangement was composed. It was never published, and neither its date of completion nor any possible premiere is known. The manuscript is now preserved with the composer's other manuscripts at the Bibliothèque nationale de France.

== Structure ==
The composition consists of four movements scored for voice with piano accompaniment. The voice can either be a soprano or a mezzo-soprano, except for "Invocation", which requires a contralto. The movement list is as follows:

1. Adieux ("Farewells"). Modéré
2. Invocation. Assez lent
3. Nuit d'automne ("Autumn Night"). Lent et sonore
4. Odelette. Modérément animé

The orchestral arrangement of "Adieux" was scored for voice and an orchestra consisting of two flutes, two oboes, an English horn, two clarinets in B♭, two bassoons, four French horns in F, two trumpets in C, three trombones, a tuba, timpani, a harp, and a string quintet.

The first poem, "Adieux," is in E♭ major. It features a persistent triplet accompaniment beneath the melodic line, which largely consists of eighth notes, and includes numerous changes of tempo and time signature. "Invocation" is a slower and more serene piece. Written in B♭ major and in 6/4, it maintains a triple meter despite various modulations and other changes. "Nuit d’automne" is in A♭ major, whereas "Odelette" is in A major; both pieces also include frequent changes of tempo, meter, and key.

== Recordings ==
Albert Roussel never recorded the set in its entirety, but he did record "Invocation," recorded on March 12, 1929. The recording was made at the Studio Albert in Paris, where mezzo-soprano Claire Croiza performed the piece with Roussel at the piano.
