= Songs of Emmanuel Chabrier =

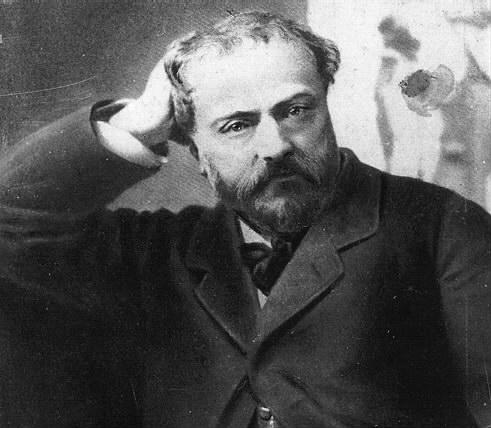
Chabrier in 1882

The French composer Emmanuel Chabrier (1841–94) wrote music in many genres, including opera and operetta, piano, orchestral music, and songs with piano accompaniment. The songs of Chabrier cover most of his creative years, from the early 1860s to 1890, when the illness which would kill him prevented much composition. (Note: Opus numbers and dates of composition are taken from Delage, Fayard, 1999, p. 687 to 719.) He came late to music as a profession, but – although being an exceptional pianist – he had no trappings of a formal training: no conservatoire studies, no Prix de Rome, "none of the conventional badges of French academic musicians, by whom he was regarded as an amateur" (in the best sense).

There are forty-three published songs by Chabrier. He began composing these mélodies when he was about twenty-one; the first nine were written between 1862 and 1866. Chabrier never set any verse by his friend Verlaine (although they did collaborate on two opéras-bouffes Fisch-Ton-Kan and Vaucochard et fils Ier), but among the better-known poets whose verse Chabrier did set in these early songs were Théodore de Banville ("Lied") and Alfred de Musset ("Adieux à Suzon"). Chabrier gave up his job at the Ministry of the Interior in 1880; as a full-time composer he set texts by Victor Hugo, Charles Baudelaire, Catulle Mendès, Edmond Rostand and his wife Rosemonde Gérard, as well as lesser-known poets, and these songs were often intended for notable singers, such as Lucien Fugère, Émile Engel, Jeanne Granier, Ernest Van Dyck and Paul Lhérie.

In a 1891 letter to Madame Colonne, wife of the famous conductor, Chabrier wrote "I'm not a natural writer of romances, which is unfortunate, because the song, agreeably warbled in salons is, at the present time, the only way for a French composer to more or less pay the rent." (Note: « Je ne suis pas très romancier de nature, et c'est malheureux, car le lied, agréablement gazouillé dans les salons, est, à l'heure qu'il est, le seul moyen pour le compositeur français d'arriver à payer relativement son terme ». Quoted in Delage, Roger. Chabrier Mélodiste. In: Emmanuel Chabrier. Ostinato rigore – revue internationale d'études musicales. No.3, 1994, Jean-Michel Place/Centre national du livre, Paris, p. 57.) None of his songs was a commercial success.

== Introduction ==
While not on the level of his contemporaries Fauré and Duparc, some of Chabrier's songs are "unique in the nineteenth century for their wit and satirical humour". Examples such as the "Villanelle des petits canards", the "Ballade des gros dindons", and the "Pastorale des cochons roses" (from the Six mélodies of 1890) "anticipated by some years the twentieth-century reaction against Romantic song". Ravel claimed that "it is impossible to hear two of his chords without attributing them at once to him, and to him alone". French composer Henri Barraud asserted that he was "the most gifted inventor of unimagined harmonies, of rare combinations of timbres, the most vigorous colourist and the most straightforward melodist". Enoch, his publisher, tried to get Chabrier to simplify what they judged to be complex piano parts which would discourage amateurs (and thus reduce sales); despite objections from the composer an edition with easy accompaniments was issued by them.

All are strophic songs, but the rhythm is usually cleverly modified in each stanza to suit the prosody of the literary text. They require, together with perfect precision, a supple, elegant style of interpretation, slightly whimsical; as remarked by Poulenc, a "laisser-aller contrôlé". The singer Claire Croiza (1882-1946) argued that in Chabrier's mélodies there is "a male quality that a woman singer can never give entirely. It must be a man who drinks well and eats well". She continued, "There is a basic roundness, and frankness. Fugère knew how to sing Chabrier. He brought to it his own roundness, his joviality." (Note: Fugère created many roles in opéras-comiques, including the Duc de Fritelli in Le Roi malgré lui by Chabrier in 1887.) The pianist and scholar Graham Johnson comments in relation to several of the songs that the demands on the singer, particularly in range of expression, can be extreme, for example "Ivresses!". In his book on the composer, his spiritual descendant, Francis Poulenc, contends that the difficulty for many singers – amateur and professional – is that Chabrier's songs fall half-way between the concert platform and the stage. He cites Jane Bathori, Roger Bourdin and Pierre Bernac as singers of his time who sought to keep their spirit alive in performance. (Note: Bathori, accompanying herself, recorded "Lied" (1886) in 1929; Bourdin, accompanied by Gustave Cloëz recorded the "Ballade des gros dindons" and the "Villanelle des petits canards" in 1931; Bernac recorded "L'Île heureuse" and the "Ballade des gros dindons" accompanied by Poulenc in 1936, and "L'Île heureuse" and "Villanelle des petits canards", again with Poulenc, in New York in 1950.)

A complete edition of the 25 original songs (excluding the regional folk song arrangements), edited and with an introduction by Roger Delage, was published in 1995 (Heugel, Paris), including two which had never before been published, Le Pas d'armes du roi Jean and Ivresses.

== Early songs ==
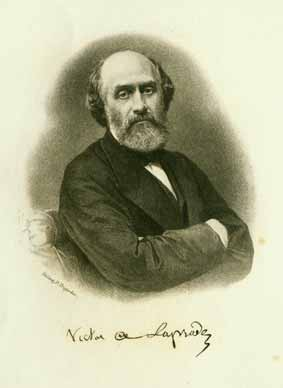
Victor de Laprade, whose poems appear in two Chabrier songs

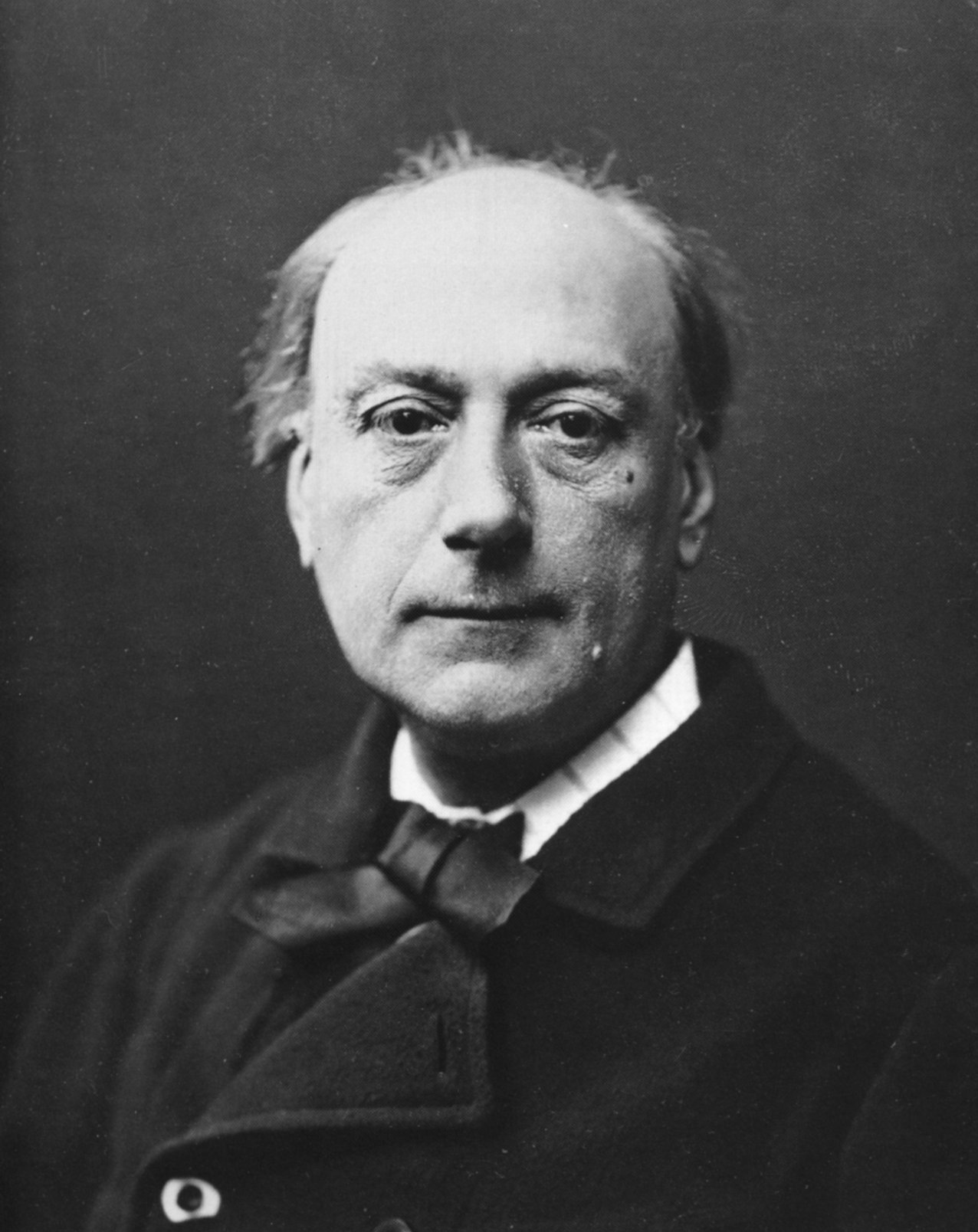
Théodore de Banville

=== Couplets de Mariette ===
« Son absence me désespère » (Mariette's song : "His absence makes me despair") (1862) – anon

Mariette laments the loss of her partner of 15 years. Johnson sees a precursor of the "Chanson de l'alouette" from Act 1 of Le Roi malgré lui. Darius Milhaud inserted the song, with new words by René Chalupt, into a production of Une éducation manquée for Diaghilev in Monte Carlo in 1924.

=== L'Enfant ===
« L'enfant est roi parmi nous » ("The child rules us as a king") (1862) – words by Victor de Laprade (from Idylles héroïques, 1855)

Parents welcome the arrival of a baby, and an impending exacting presence in the home.

=== Ronde gauloise ===
« J'ai vu la fille du meunier » ("I saw the miller's daughter") (1862) – anon

The song evokes a bourrée folk song as a young man gives voice to his love.

=== Le Sentier sombre ===
« Il est un sentier sombre au fond de nos vallées » ("There's a shady path down in the valley") (1862) – anon

A country lad recalls his first love.

=== Lied ===
« Avec ces traits harmonieux » ("with these harmonious features") (1862) – words by Théodore de Banville ('Inviolata' from Améthystes, 1862)

Another love song, where the performers are instructed to sing "con passione".

=== Chants d'oiseaux ===
« Quand nous chantons nos amours » (Bird songs :"When we sing about our love") (1862) – words by Victor de Laprade (in the Livre troisième of Rose Mystica from Idylles héroïques, 1855)

Johnson regards it as "one of Chabrier's earliest masterpieces – a perfect example of his musical conjuring". Predating the barnyard songs, in this second Laprade setting, a bird in a tree comments on the vicissitudes of human love.

=== Sérénade ===
« La plus charmante femme » ("The most charming woman") (1862) – words by the painter, sculptor and poet Auguste de Châtillon (from À la Grand'Pinte, 1860)

A man sings of his obsessive love.

=== Adieux à Suzon ===
words by Alfred de Musset (1862; later set by Bizet in 1866)

A man's vigorous farewell to his love which ends in "renunciation and gentle melancholy" (Johnson). Musicologist Winton Dean describes Bizet's version as a "delightful setting of a half-tender, half-mocking love poem", but Delage considers that Chabrier's setting, with its triple rhythm, sly chromaticism in the bass line, all part of an "allegro risoluto ed appassionato" captures better the mood of the poet.

=== Ah! petit démon ===
(« Ha, little devil ») (1862) – words by Auguste de Châtillon (from À la Grand'Pinte, 1860)

The second Châtillon setting concerns the 'little devil' who comes to steal the singer's grapes at midnight.

== The developing songwriter ==
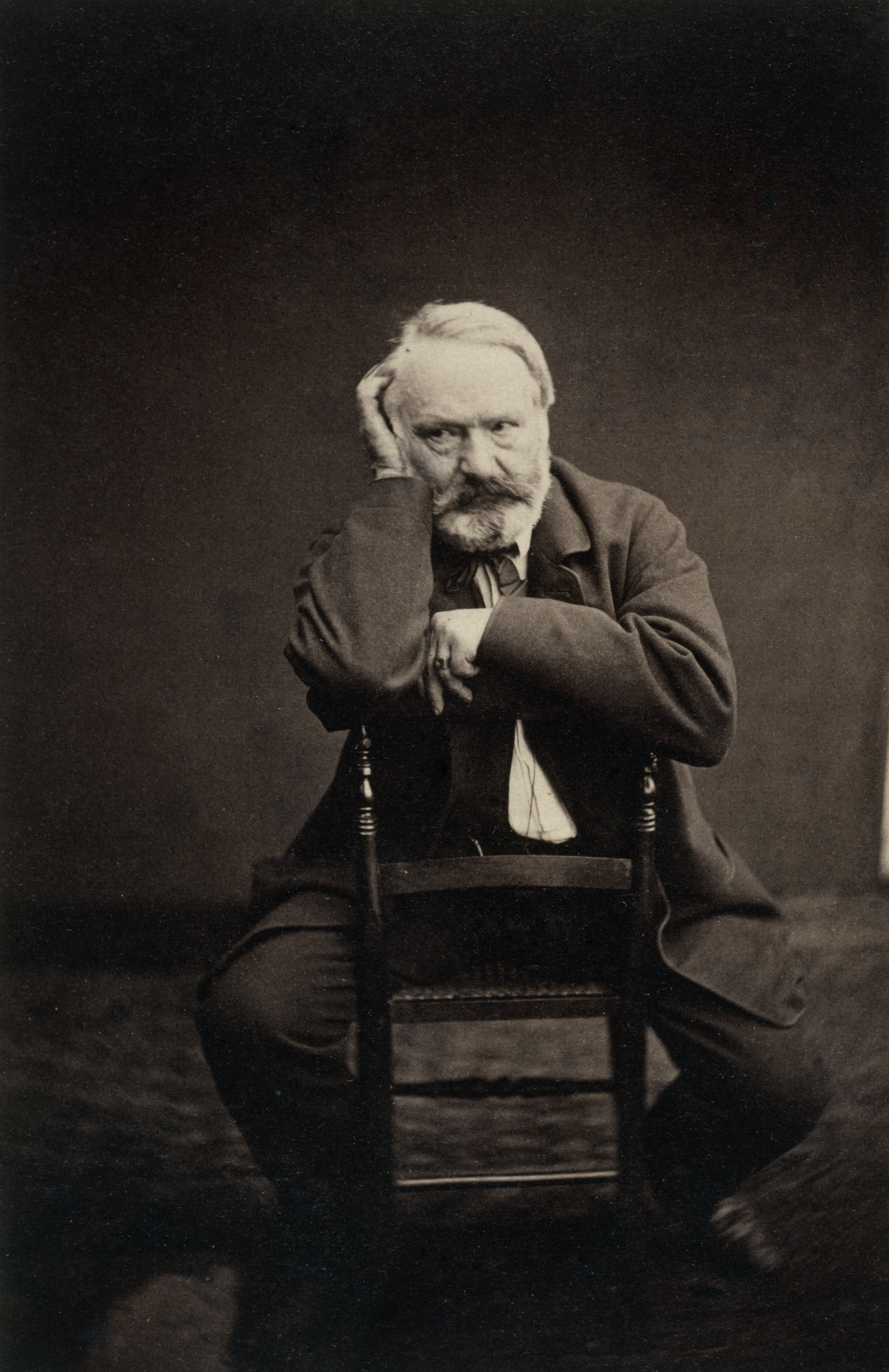
Victor Hugo, who provided words for three Chabrier songs

=== Le pas d'armes du roi Jean ===
« Ça! qu'on selle » ("Right, saddle-up") (1866) – words by Victor Hugo (Ballade XII from Odes et Ballades, 1826).

The song is about a page who falls in a tournament. The young Saint-Saëns set fourteen of Hugo's 32 verses in 1852; Chabrier set eight. "One must admire Saint-Saëns's skill in making a long and effective piece out of unpromising material [...] how much better Chabrier captures, right from the start, the spirit of the festive joust with music which rattles jovially between the hands", Johnson comments. Chabrier regularly sang this song at the Marquise de Ricard's Parnassian salon. It evokes the galop of a horse and plays on ambivalence between modal and tonal harmony, creating new and strange effects.

=== Ivresses! ===
Grande Valse – « Viens! je veux les caresses » ("Come, I want your caresses") (1869) – words by Léon Labarre.

The song is about uncontrollable physical love with wild and impassioned pleas for wine and kisses; Delage describes the words of this song as "improbable" (« invraisemblables ») but Chabrier manages through two gay and rhythmic waltzes to evoke the world of the café-concert. The music reappears subsequently in his Suite de valses of 1872. After a vivace introduction, interrupted by a mysterious andante, the first waltz mimes musically an ardent, unbuttoned love. The second waltz 'espress. Ed appassionato' starts after a short recitative like passage ; the first waltz returns with new harmonies. Notes on the score (cymbal, timpani, violins) indicate that Chabrier had an orchestration in mind. Steven Huebner notes that Chabrier's melodies (instrumental and vocal) are frequently combined with chromatic decoration, citing as an example 'Ivresses'.

=== L'invitation au voyage ===
« Mon enfant, ma sœur, songe à la douceur d'aller là-bas » (Call to expedition : "My child, sister, think how sweet to go over there") words by Charles Baudelaire (from Les Fleurs du mal, 1855, 1857), set at the same time by Duparc (two verses only)

This is about lovers escaping to a place of luxury, calm and sensuality. Chabrier's longest song contains an obbligato part for bassoon. (Note: The part is used in recordings by Laplante, San, Mellon, Lott (2001).) Chabrier savoured the richness of full 9th harmonics; the phrase "d'aller là-bas vivre ensemble" in this song is "set to a succession of 9th chords with root movement by a 5th. The whole song is a study in such harmonies where Chabrier pays particular attention to the colour of the 9th in different registers of the keyboard and even the voice".

=== Couplets de Mariette ===
« À quoi bon entendre les oiseaux des bois ? » ("Why listen to the birds from the woods" – the most tender bird sings in your voice...) (1873, published in 1913) words by Victor Hugo (from Act II of Ruy Blas, 1838; off-stage voices of laundrywomen)

Set in 17th century Spain; the music follows the text closely. It features a lively ritournelle between the verses and a close of softness and mystery, briefly and unexpectedly turning to the sub-dominant, very typical of the composer. A rich and lavish accompaniment sets out it apart from the typical French romance, ranging – with embellishments, shades of modal hue and chromaticism – across the whole keyboard. Composed in the same year as Chabrier's ground-breaking Impromptu for piano, Roy Howat writes that it could easily pass for Wolf.

== Full-time composer ==
=== Sommation irrespectueuse ===
« Rire, étant si jolie, c'est mal » (Disrespectful address : "Laughter, being so pretty, is wrong") (1880) – words by Victor Hugo (Sommation irrespectueuse, VIII. of L'éternel petit roman, VI. from Les Chansons des Rues et des Bois, 1865) This dark song was composed in August 1880 when the Chabriers were on holiday at Saint-Pair-sur-Mer; another poem from the same Hugo collection at the same time inspired Idylle, the sixth Pièces pittoresques. The song was premiered at the Société Nationale de Musique on 9 April 1881 by Léon Melchissédec, like Chabrier from Auvergne. Modal colouration is present again, though Delage contends that Chabrier's use of modes differs from his younger friend Fauré, in coming from "popular music imbibed in childhood, rather than through formal study of 16th century music". Howat remarks that this song, with echoes of Mussorgsky (specifically "In the corner", no.2 from The Nursery), is probably the earliest example of the assimilation of contemporary Russian musical syntax into French music, and which Chabrier would have been exposed to only via scores, as Mussorgsky's songs were not heard in Paris until the mid 1890s. Johnson adds that the verses 16 to 18 are "set to some of the most frantic music in all Chabrier".
In the film Rien de personnel (2009, Gokalp) Sommation Irrespectueuse appears in each segment, sung by Pascal Greggory as Muller.

=== Credo d'amour ===
« Je crois aux choses éternelles » (Love creed : "I believe in things eternal") (1883) – words by Armand Silvestre ('Credo' from La chanson des heures, 1878) A few years previously Chabrier had begun work with Silvestre on Le Sabbat, a two-act opéra comique, which was not completed. The words reflect the composer's regular praise of the female sex. It is dedicated to Madame Enoch, wife of one of his publishers.

=== "España" ===
« À Séville, séjour où les roses » ("In Seville, where the roses bloom") (1883) – the words by Eugène Adenis were written to fit the most famous work by Chabrier, his orchestral rhapsody of 1883, one of several arrangements of the work.

=== Tes yeux bleus ===
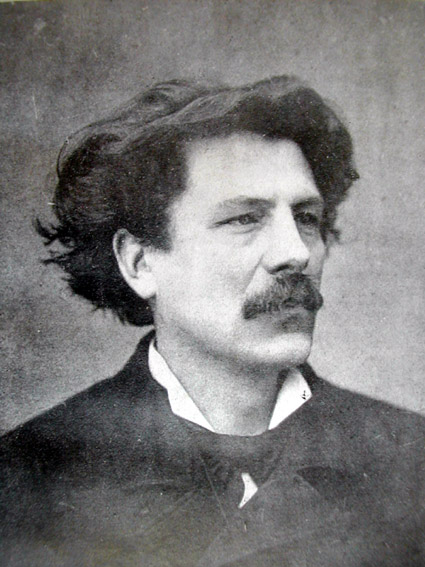
Maurice Rollinat

words by Maurice Rollinat (from Les névroses, 1883)

The song is about the pleasures of sensual enjoyment. With words by a close colleague, Chabrier seems here to have absorbed the musical language of the love duets from Tristan und Isolde, which he had seen and heard in Munich in 1880. The song was first heard in public in 1887 at the Société Nationale. Although Wagnerian techniques abound – unorthodox scales and cadences, rhythmic ambiguities between 3/4 and 6/8 – Chabrier retains his own voice. The manuscript carries a sub-title romance, implying the old French form, which is highlighted by use of the title words as a refrain. Howat sees a precedent here for the Adagio assai second movement of Ravel's G major concerto « with its undercurrent of 6/8 across its slow 3/4 metre ».

One writer has noted that it is an example of Chabrier's gift "one which eluded so many of his contemporaries – of allowing his music to be suffused by the influence of Wagner whilst still retaining his own distinctive voice". Although the music includes clear allusions to the German composer – a pulsating quaver accompaniment, extended, arching vocal lines, and the echoes of the Liebestod in the final bars – Chabrier adds "with the lightest of touches, other dimensions which are entirely his own such as the delicate cross-rhythms in the accompaniment. This is the only song to have been orchestrated by Chabrier – for strings.

=== Lied ===
« Nez au vent, cœur plein d'aise » ("Into the breeze, happy at heart") (1886) – words by Catulle Mendès (from Philoméla, 1863)

This the second Chabrier song with this title, but on a very different subject matter; marked "gaiement", it concerns an encounter between Berthe and an elf in the woods who tempts her to go and pick strawberries off the beaten path. In his book on Chabrier, Poulenc wrote "I know of nothing so insolent in French song". He also describes the poem as "fripon", or "roguish" and the whole song as "d'une fantaisie extraordinaire". Bernac describes this as a "gay, naughty, (and very 1890s) little poem, so wonderfully expressed musically", and recommends a strict tempo with no rubato. Delage points out that Berthe has lost her way in the uncertain tonality of the opening ritournelle; only rediscovering it in bar nine. Although in couplets, each one is varied according to the words enlivened by the melody straying into different registers while the accompaniment frees itself into roguish dissonances.

=== Chanson pour Jeanne ===
« Puisque les roses sont jolies » ("Since the roses are pretty") (1886) – words by Catulle Mendès (from Intermède, 1885)

It was in connection with this song (entitled 'Romance') that Chabrier wrote a notable letter to his publishers Enoch in which he vouched that its music "is certainly music of today or tomorrow, but not of yesterday", adding "This romance, you doubtlessly won't understand any of it, at first glance; I will play it to you in three weeks... do not make a judgement until you have studied it". It was dedicated to Émile Engel, who had created the rôle of Armel in Chabrier's Gwendoline in April 1886 and remained a friend. Although the song is basically strophic, the composer creates modulations by juxtaposition of a differing melodic vision and adding foreign notes to ordinary chords of the scale. Chabrier's subtly equivocal harmonies here are so original in their application that they had a profound effect of the musical development of Ravel. In his 'Esquisse autobiographique' of 1928, Ravel wrote "the Habanera [Ravel, 1895] embodies many of the elements which were to dominate my later compositions, and which through Chabrier's influence (as for instance in the "Chanson pour Jeanne") I have been able to crystallize". Ravel brought this song to his harmony classes under Pessard. Markings "dolce" and "espressivo" predominate. Bernac considers this as "another mélodie extremely rubato. The numerous changes in tempo, the dynamics and nuances are carefully indicated and should be observed".

== Les plus jolies chansons du pays de France ==
In 1888 Chabrier arranged sixteen French folk songs for an anthology called Le plus jolies chansons du pays de France. He was among the first important composers at this time to work in this way with folk songs, a pioneer for Ravel, Bartók, Britten and others. Johnson comments that Chabrier's touch in these pieces is "deceptively light and restrained", but that the piano writing adds enormously to the charm of the music. (Note: Delage 1999 p. 713. The arranger of the other songs was Armand Gouzien.)

- Les Métamorphoses – 'Chanson canadienne' (No.7) – Canada a circular song in 9/8 where the lovers 'transform' themselves until they eventually catch each other.
- Sur le bord de l'île – 'Chanson champenoise' (No.13) – from Champagne. A girl drops her gold ring in the river and a young man drowns trying to rescue it.
- Les Filles de trente ans – 'Chanson angoumoisine' (No.16) – from Angoumois …are too old and have missed out on love.
- Marion s'en va-t-a l'ou – 'Chanson auvergnate' (No.19) – from Auvergne ; a song also found in Poitou and Angoulême.
- La Mie du voleur – 'Chanson agenoise' (No.20), where a girl refuses the hand of a swordsman in favour of a thief.
- Que les amants ont de la peine! – 'Chanson poitevine' (No.21) – from Poitou – the tribulations of lovers.
- Le Flambeau éteint – 'Chanson nivernaise' (No.24) – from Nivernais (a song also found in Nordic countries), where the torch in the title lures the handsome youth to death by his lover's father.
- Joli dragon – 'Chanson languedocienne' (No.25) – from Languedoc where a handsome soldier, courted by a lady, returns to his own land where the girls are prettier.
- Nique nac no muse! – 'Chanson normande' (No.26) – from Normandy. The title words are nonsense, but a man is overcome by the beauty of his sweetheart.
- La Bien-aimée – 'Chanson angoumoisine' (No.29) where a girl wanders by the river with three young men.
- La Mort de la brune – 'Chanson franc-comtoise' (No.31) – from Franche-Comté. An elegy on a dying girl.
- Les Garçons de Bordeaux – 'Chanson bordelaise' (No.32) is a sailor's song.
- Bergère et Chasseur – 'Chanson poitevine' (No.33). A huntsman fails to seduce a shepherdess, whose lover is in the king's service in Paris.
- La Fleur dorée – 'Chanson agenoise' (No.34) compares the yellow flowers of the field with a gold flower in the heart.
- Entrez, la Belle en vigne – 'Chanson saintongeoise' (No.35) – from Saintonge. A young woman hesitates to enter the vineyard because of the thorns, but is persuaded by the offer of gloves.
- Le Déserteur – 'Chanson poitevine' (No.36)

== Late songs ==
6 mélodies (1890) come just before the onset of the degeneration of Chabrier's health as he completed his last piano work, the Bourrée fantasque, and struggled to get his opera Briséïs committed to manuscript. Of these six, a group of four songs with a linking theme is what Chabrier called his "volailleries" [fowl songs], to lyrics by Edmond Rostand and Rosemonde Gérard, with subjects including fat turkeys, little ducklings, pink pigs and chirping cicadas. Rollo Myers comments that these songs "could have been written by no one else", and that in the four "farmyard songs", as they are more usually referred to, Chabrier "made musical history" where "the salient features of each of the creatures portrayed are underlined with a most disarming mixture of irony, humour and realism". Although Offenbach (1842) and Lecocq (among others) had set some of La Fontaine's animal fables to music, Chabrier "introduced a new note into contemporary French music", prefiguring Ravel's Histoires naturelles. Although he did not complete others in a similar vein, Coquelin Cadet wrote to Chabrier asking him to write a Ballade des Veaux (also referred to by Chabrier as Valse des Veaux).

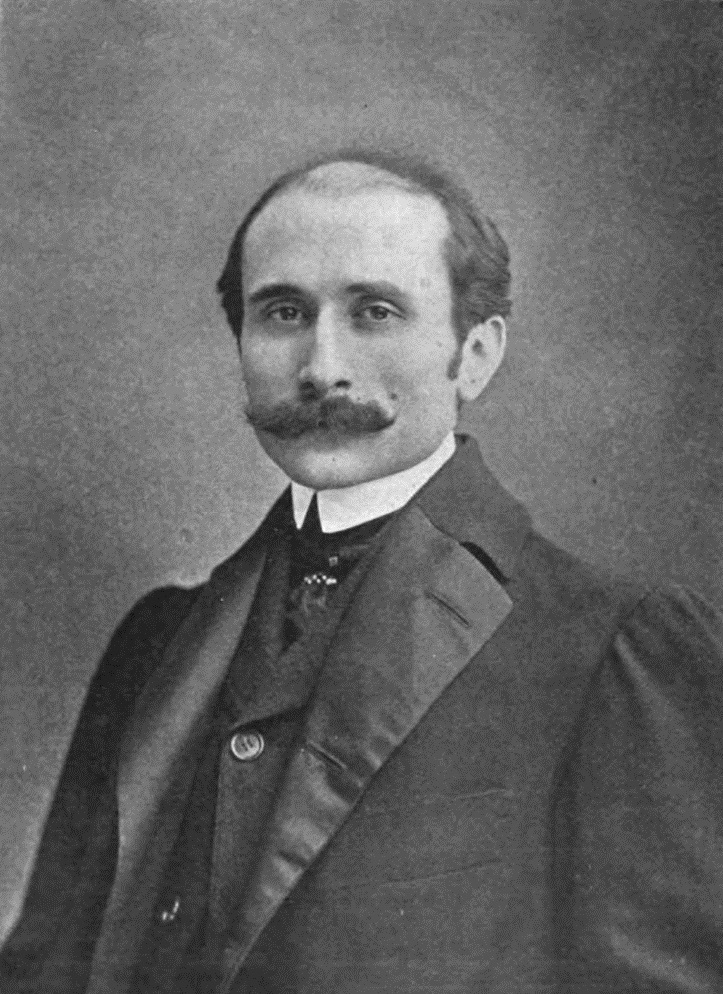
Rostand

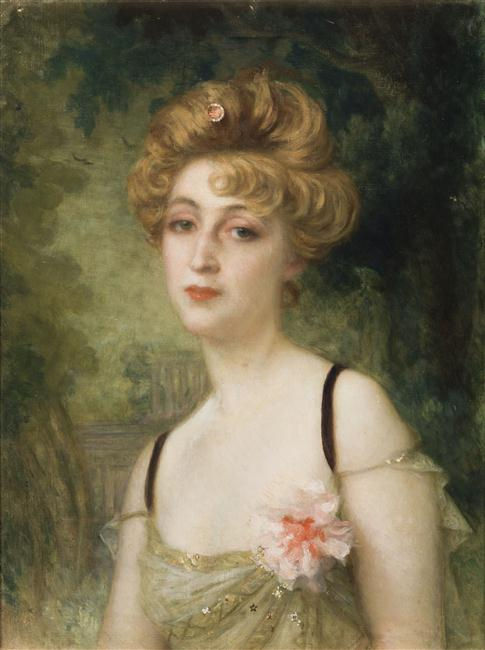
and Gérard

=== Ballade des gros dindons ===
« Les gros dindons, à travers champs » (1889) – words by Edmond Rostand (according to Delage the verse may have been written expressly for Chabrier). It is marked "bêtement" (stupidly) Compared with other Chabrier songs, the Ballade lacks harmonic complexity; but it is full of humour – the turkeys "seem to essay the steps of a habanera (Note: Chabrier had composed a habanera for piano solo in 1885, orchestrated by him in 1888.), while the serenade from Don Giovanni sounds out where one would least expect – like a punch on the nose". Delage muses that Chabrier's friend Manet, whose Les Dindons was first seen in 1877, causing mad laughter from its first viewers, may have planted a seed in the composer's mind. Bernac comments "The ritornello imitating comically the mandolin accompaniment of the serenade of Mozart's Don Giovanni should be played with no rubato at all, no hurry, flatly and fatuously". It is dedicated to Jeanne Granier. In Chabrier's Cocodette et Cocorico (1878) the singers were a rooster and a hen.

=== Villanelle des petits canards ===
« Ils vont, les petits canards » (1889) – words by Rosemonde Gérard (from Les Pipeaux) Marked "très simplement et très rythmé", Johnson asks "has there ever been a more witty use of syncopation and silence in musical characterization?". Bernac again argues for "precise and immutable" rhythm and tempo in this song. It is dedicated to Mily-Meyer, although Chabrier was not satisfied with her interpretation.

=== Pastorale des cochons roses ===
« Le jour s'annonce à l'Orient » (1889) – words by Edmond Rostand from Les Musardises It is dedicated to Lucien Fugère. As dawn breaks, a farmboy takes a drift of pigs along a path, who proceed to play all day until they are led back to their bed where they all fall asleep. Huebner notes the "naïve pastoral 5ths" which underpin "long dissonant chords in the right hand".

=== Les Cigales ===
« Le soleil est droit sur la sente » (1889) – words by Rosemonde Gérard (from Les Pipeaux) The monotonous chirping is illustrated in the piano dissonances. The cicadas have "more soul than viols and sing better than violins". The piano part suggests the grating of the cicadas in the warm atmosphere of the south of France at noon. Johnson draws a comparison with the song Les Grillons by Bizet, where the younger composer anticipates Chabrier with an « astonishing tour de force in the manner of the lively cicadas of Chabrier ».p24 Myers sees Ravel's harmonic formula for the grillon winding up her watch in his Histoires naturelles is "an actual crib of Chabrier's ingenious way of suggesting the shrill chirping of the cicadas". Delage goes further, saying that the "extension of what one finds in the astonishing accompaniment of the song Les Cigales, with its minor seconds under direct attack, bursts forth in Jeux d'eau and Ondine". It is dedicated to his niece Isabelle Jacmart. Manuel Rosenthal made orchestrations of the piano part of the volailleries, which were then performed by Madeleine Grey with Rosenthal conducting at the Concerts Colonne in 1935.

=== Toutes les fleurs ===
« Toutes les fleurs, certes, je les adore ! » (1889) – words by Edmond Rostand The markings are "appassionato, con fuoco" and "très joyeux". The poet adores all the flowers but above all he is in love with lilacs and roses. In 1909 Reynaldo Hahn made a recording of this song, accompanying himself at the piano. It is dedicated to Chabrier's friend Ernest Van Dyck. In a letter of January 1890, Chabrier wrote to the dedicatee ('Nénerst') that the song is an "irresistible salon outpouring", and included a sketch of the first four bars of the vocal part.

=== L'Île heureuse ===
« Dans le golfe aux jardins ombreux » (1889) (The Joyous Isle : "In the gulf with shady gardens") – words by Ephraïm Mikhaël, marked "Animato, molto rubato ed appassionato" (animated with much rubato and passion), and when the voice enters "con slancio" (with abandon) One writer called it "one of the most beautiful of all evocations of a voyage to mythic Cythera", through its "yearning chromatic harmonies and swelling and rocking rhythms". Bernac describes the poem as "mediocre and rather unimportant", but the singer requires a lyricism "approaching caricature". Howat sees echoes of this song in Debussy's "Le balcon" of the same year. Ninon Vallin, accompanied by Alberto de Pierlas, recorded "L'Île heureuse" in 1933, and Hahn accompanied himself in 1909 and 1927.

=== Other vocal works ===
Duo de l'ouvreuse de l'Opéra-Comique et de l'employé du Bon Marché (Duet of the usherette from the Opéra-Comique and the employee of the Bon-Marché department store) is a comic vocal work for soprano and tenor, with piano accompaniment. The lyrics are by Paul Fuchs and Henry Lyon. – « Le sort jadis ne me faisait pas fête comme aujourd'hui » (1888)

À la musique is for solo soprano, women's chorus and orchestra (or piano). The words are by Edmond Rostand.

== Recordings ==
The creators did not leave recordings of their songs, although Fugère did record two airs from Le Roi malgré lui in 1930. Hahn accompanied himself in three Chabrier songs: "Les Cigales" in 1919, "L'Île heureuse" in 1909 and 1927, and "Toutes les fleurs" in 1919 and 1927. A complete cycle was set down in 2001 for Hyperion Records by Felicity Lott, Stephen Varcoe, William Burden, and others; with Graham Johnson (piano), who also wrote comprehensive essays for the booklet, on two compact discs. (Note: An earlier recital, 'Mélodies sur des poèmes de Baudelaire' by Lott and Johnson for Harmonia Mundi in the mid-1980s includes Chabrier's "L'Invitation au Voyage", but without the bassoon part and with only two verses (the same as in the Duparc, also on the record). The recordings by de San and Mellon only have two verses, but do have the bassoon.) Leaving aside recitals featuring only one or two Chabrier songs, other recordings include:

- 1952 – Four songs ("Villanelle des petits canards", "Les Cigales", "Ballade des gros dindons", "L'île heureuse") – Jacques Jansen; Jacqueline Bonneau (piano) – Decca
- 1954 – Fourteen songs – Renée Doria, Guy Fouché, Julien Giovannetti; Tasso Janopoulo (piano) – Pléiade
- 1954 – Four songs ("Ballade des gros dindons", "Pastorale des cochons roses", "Chanson pour Jeanne" and "L'Île heureuse") – Christiane Castelli; Hélène Boschi (piano) – Le Chant du Monde
- 1957 – The 'Barnyard' songs – Camille Maurane, György Sebok (piano) – Erato
- 1978 – Five songs ('Barnyard' songs and "L'Île heureuse") – Hugues Cuénod; Geoffrey Parsons – Nimbus
- 1978 – Thirteen songs – Bruno Laplante; Janine Lachance (piano) – Calliope
- 1990 – Three songs ("Chanson pour Jeanne", "Lied" (1886), "L'île heureuse") – Rachel Yakar ; Claude Lavois (piano) – Virgin
- 1993 – Twenty-two songs – Ludovic de San; Diane Andersen (piano) – Discover International
- 1994 – Fourteen songs – Erick Frelon; Laurent Martin (piano) – Ligia Digital
- 1997 – Twenty-three songs – Franck Leguérinel, Agnès Mellon; Françoise Tillard (piano) – Timpani
- 2006 – Seven songs – Paul Sperry; Ian Hobson (piano) – Zephyr
- 2009 – Eight songs – Brigitte Balleys; Laurent Martin (piano).
- 2018 – The 'Barnyard' songs – Sophie Karthäuser; Eugene Asti (piano) - Harmonia Mundi

== Notes and references ==
Notes

== Sources ==
- Bernac, Pierre (1970). The Interpretation of French Song. New York – Washington: Praeger Publishers.
- Delage, Roger (1999). Emmanuel Chabrier (in French). Paris: Fayard. ISBN 978-2-213-60508-1.
- Johnson, Graham (2002). Musique adorable! The songs of Emmanuel Chabrier. Hyperion Records. OCLC 1055457940.
