= Sylvain Dupuis =

Belgian conductor, composer, oboist and music educator (1856–1931)

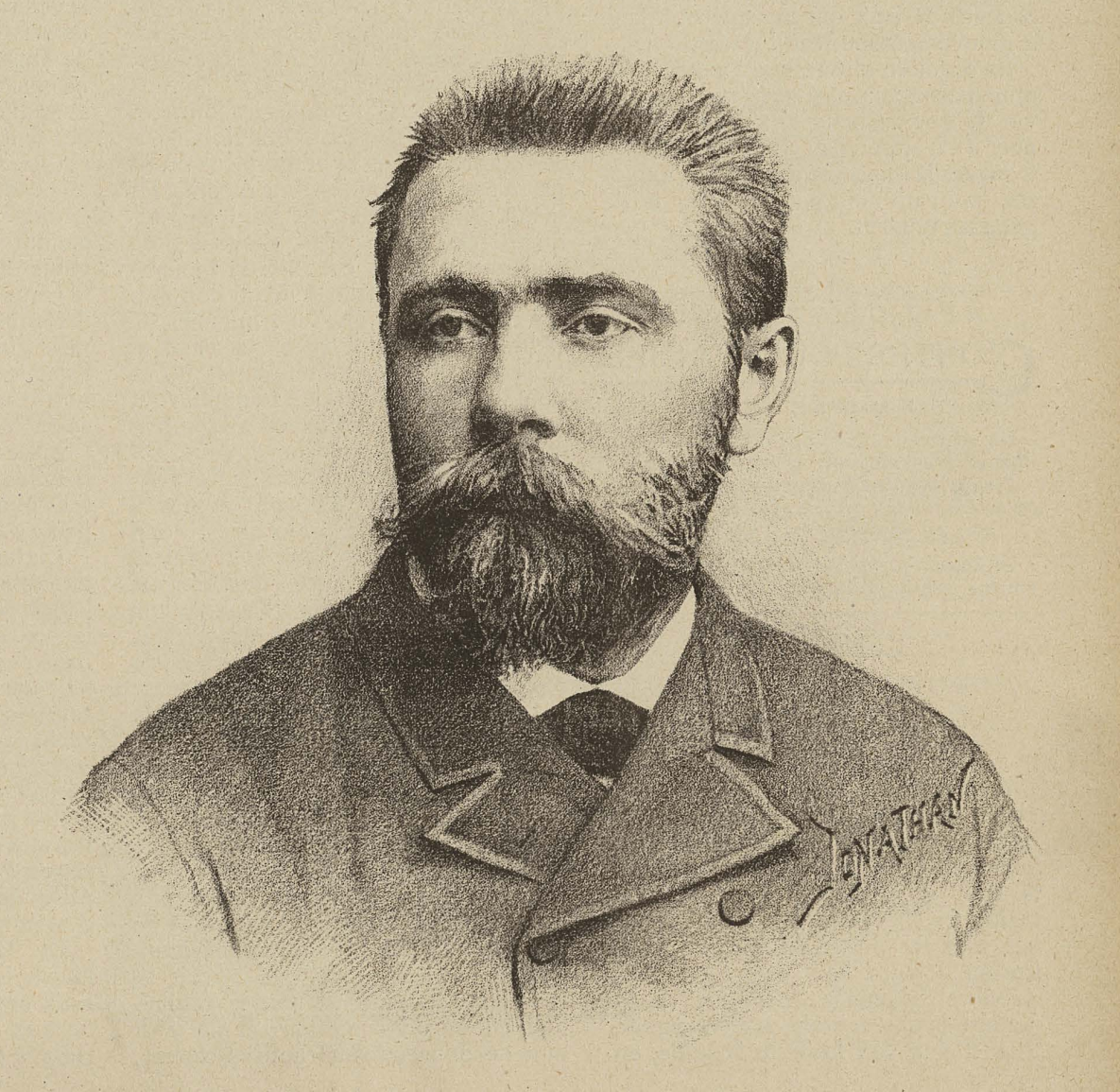
Sylvain Dupuis

Joseph Michel Sylvain Dupuis (French pronunciation: [ʒozɛf miʃɛl silvɛ̃ dypɥi]; 9 October 1856 – 28 September 1931) was a Belgian conductor, composer, oboist, and music educator.

== Life ==
Born in Liège, Dupuis was trained at the Royal Conservatory of Liège. After graduating in 1878, he was appointed to that school's faculty as a professor of harmony. In 1911 he succeeded Jean-Théodore Radoux as the director of the conservatory. Among his notable pupils were Charles Houdret and Joseph Jongen.

Dupuis worked actively as a composer during the early part of his career, but later became more heavily involved in his work as an opera conductor and music teacher. As a result, the majority of his works date from before 1900. In 1879 he won the Belgian Prix de Rome for his cantata Le Chant de la Création. In the 1880s he composed two operas, Moîna and Coûr d'ognon. His other compositions include several secular cantatas, the symphonic poem Macbeth, a concertino for oboe and orchestra, a number of choral works, and music for solo organ, piano, violin and cello.

In 1890 Dupuis was appointed to the conducting staff at the Théâtre Royal de la Monnaie, and in 1900 he assumed the role of principal conductor at that house. He notably conducted that opera house's first productions of Götterdämmerung (13 January 1891), Die Entführung aus dem Serail (15 February 1902), Tosca (2 April 1904), Alceste (14 December 1904), La damnation de Faust (21 February 1906), Les Troyens (27 December 1906), Salome (26 March 1907), Fortunio (4 January 1908), Ariane et Barbe-bleue (2 January 1909), Madama Butterfly (29 October 1909), Elektra (26 May 1910), Feuersnot (16 March 1911), and Roma (15 January 1913). He also conducted numerous world premieres, including Ernest Chausson's Le roi Arthus (30 November 1903), Albert Dupuis's Martylle (3 March 1905), Albert Roussel's Symphony No. 1 Le poème de la forêt (22 March 1908), Pierre de Bréville's Éros vainqueur (7 March 1910), Cesare Galeotti's Dorisse (18 April 1910), and Vincent d'Indy's Le chant de la cloche (21 November 1912). He also conducted the premiere of the third and final revision of Isaac Albéniz's Pepita Jiménez on 3 January 1905.

Dupuis died in Bruges at age 74.

== Honours ==
- 1919 : Commander of the Order of Leopold.
