= Deux poèmes chinois, Op. 12 (Roussel) =

1908 composition by Albert Roussel

Deux poèmes chinois
- by Albert Roussel
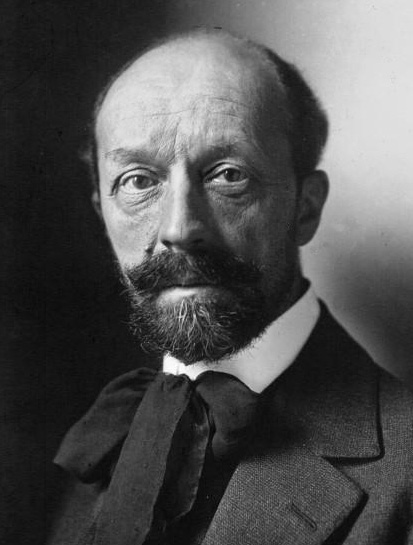
- The composer
- Catalogue: L. 13
- Opus: Op. 12
- Year: 1908
- Language: French
- Dedication: Alfred Cortot's wife, Clothilde Breal (No. I); Mary Pironnay (No. II)
- Published: 1908 – Paris (No. I); 1910 – Paris (No. II)
- Publisher: Rouart, Lerolle & Cie. (Éditions Salabert)
- Movements: 2
- Scoring: Voice and piano

Premiere
- Date: June 28, 1907; 119 years ago (No. I); February 14, 1909; 117 years ago (No. II)
- Location: Le Havre, France
- Performers: Mary Pironnay (soprano) (No. I); Suzanne Balguerie (mezzo-soprano) (No. II); Albert Roussel (piano)

Deux poèmes chinois, Op. 12 (from French, Two Chinese Poems), is a composition for voice and piano by French composer Albert Roussel. It was finished in 1908.

== Background ==
Roussel, originally a naval officer who left the French navy due to poor health, devoted his life to music from 1898, when he joined the Schola Cantorum. During his early years as a composer, he wrote a wide range of works, such as his Piano Sonata No. 1 (1908), his Symphony No. 1 (1906), and his Piano Trio (1902). The Deux poèmes were written in Paris. “À un jeune gentilhomme” (No. I) was written on March 9, 1907, and dedicated to world-renowned pianist Alfred Cortot's wife Clothilde Breal, and “Amoureux séparés” (No. II) was written on February 29, 1908, and dedicated to Mary Pironnay.

The set was not premiered as a single composition. The first performance of “À un jeune gentilhomme” was given at the Cercle de l'art moderne in Le Havre on June 28, 1907. The performance was given by Roussel at the piano with the soprano Mary Pironnay. Another important performance took place in Paris at the Salle Érard, in a concert hosted by the Société nationale de musique, on January 11, 1908, with the mezzo-soprano Jane Bathori and Roussel at the piano. The second piece was premiered at the Cercle de l'art moderne in Le Havre during the first festival of Roussel’s works, on February 14, 1909, performed by Suzanne Balguerie with the composer at the piano. The set was also not published as a standalone work; instead, each piece was initially published independently. It was published by Rouart, Lerolle & Cie. in Paris: the first piece in 1908 and the second in 1910. Both manuscripts are nowadays preserved at the Bibliothèque nationale de France.

The texts of the poems are based on Chinese poetry. "À un jeune gentilhomme" is derived from an anonymous poem in the Classic of Poetry (詩經), the oldest surviving collection of Chinese poetry. The original poem, titled “Zhongzi, Do Not Come” (將仲子), is poem no. 76 in the collection and appears in the Airs of the States, in the Odes of Zheng section. The second poem, “Amoureux séparés,” was adapted from a poem by Fu Xuan, which was incorrectly attributed to Mi Fu. The original poem was titled “Song of Wu and Chu” (吳楚歌). The poems were not set in the original Chinese. They were first collected and translated into English by Herbert Allen Giles, in a collection entitled Chinese Poetry in English Verse, published by Quartich in London in 1898, later reissued in 1902. It was then translated and adapted into French by Henri-Pierre Roché and first published in the Vers et proses magazine, which is the text Roussel took for his composition. The French verses were subsequently retranslated into English by Rosa Newmarch for publication.

== Structure ==
The piece is scored for voice and piano accompaniment. The voice is expected to be a soprano in the first piece, and a medium voice in the second. With a duration of around four minutes, it is one of Roussel's shortest song cycles. The movement list is as follows:

1. [Ode chinoise] À un jeune gentilhomme ([Chinese Ode] To a Young Gentleman). Vif et léger
2. Amoureux séparés (Lovers Divided). Modérément animé

== Recordings ==
Albert Roussel didn't record the whole set, but he recorded "Amoureux séparés" on March 12, 1929. The recording was made at the Studio Albert in Paris, where mezzo-soprano Claire Croiza performed the piece with Roussel at the piano.
