= Quatre poèmes, Op. 3 (Roussel) =

Quatre poèmes
- by Albert Roussel
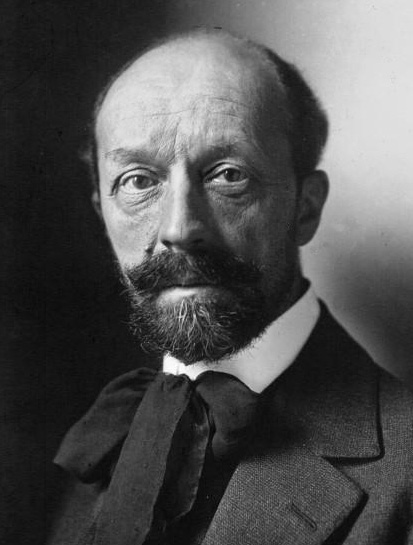
- The composer
- Catalogue: L. 3
- Opus: Op. 3
- Year: 1903
- Text: Henri de Regnier's Les médailles d'argile (1900)
- Language: French
- Dedication: Jeanne Raunay (No. I); Mary Garden (No. II); Maurice Bagès (No. III); M^{me} Albert Groz (No. IV)
- Published: 1910 - Paris
- Publisher: Rouart, Lerolle & Cie. (Éditions Salabert)
- Movements: 4
- Scoring: Voice and piano

Premiere
- Date: April 21, 1906; 119 years ago
- Location: Salle Pleyel, Paris, France
- Performers: Jane Bathori (soprano); Alfred Cortot (piano)

Quatre poèmes, Op. 3, L. 3 (from French, Four Poems) is a short song cycle composed by French composer Albert Roussel. Completed in 1903, it marks the first vocal work by Roussel.

== Background ==
Roussel, a late starter, wrote his first vocal work and one of his first compositions altogether at the age of 34. Quatre poèmes was completed in the fall of 1903 in Tamaris, France, and is generally conceived to be a twin composition with his Quatre poèmes, Op. 8. The first two poems were written in September, while the latter two followed in October. The original handwritten manuscripts for poems I, II, and IV are now preserved at the Bibliothèque Nationale de France. The original manuscript for the third song, "Le jardin mouillé", however, is now considered to be lost. It was written to texts by Henri de Régnier taken from a collection entitled Les médailles d'argile (1900). It premiered in Paris on April 21, 1906 at the Salle Pleyel, under the auspices of the Société nationale de musique. The premiere was performed by mezzo-soprano Jane Bathori, with Alfred Cortot at the piano. The work was later published in Paris by Rouart, Lerolle & Cie. in 1910, in a French edition with English translations provided by Rosa Newmarch. It is nowadays reissued by Éditions Salabert.

Each poem in the set was dedicated to a different person, typically fellow musicians. “Le Départ” was dedicated to Jeanne Raunay, a French mezzo-soprano opera singer. “Vœu” was dedicated to the Scottish-American lyric soprano Mary Garden, who also spent many years developing her career in France. “Le jardin mouillé” was dedicated to Maurice Bagès, a French singer active in aristocratic and artistic salons and who left no recordings after dying tragically young. Finally, “Madrigal lyrique” was dedicated to “M^{me} Albert Groz,” a person whose identity has not been clearly established.

== Structure ==
The suite is scored for solo voice with piano accompaniment. While the first song is specifically for a soprano, the other songs are generally played by mezzo-sopranos. The movement list is as follows:

1. Le départ (The Departure). Assez lent
2. Vœu (The Wish). Modéré
3. Le jardin mouillé (The Garden in Rain). Modéré
4. Madrigal lyrique (Madrigal). Très modéré

"Le départ" is a short piece in D minor with a slow 6/8 tempo. It is 72 bars long. "Vœu" is a bit more lively, with the expression marking "dolce" all throughout. It is in E major and, and has 59 bars. The time signature in "Le jardin mouillé" only features a 3. It is in C minor and is marked "doux et léger" (sweet and light). It is 61 bars long. Finally, "Madrigal lyrique"'s time signature specified it has an alternating meter of 4/42/4. It is in D♭ major, but has a rapidly modulating key. It is 68 bars long.

== Recordings ==
One of the few recordings of Albert Roussel that has survived is his performance of “Le jardin mouillé,” recorded on March 12, 1929. The recording was made at the Studio Albert in Paris, where mezzo-soprano Claire Croiza performed the piece with Roussel at the piano.

== Reception ==
Pianist Graham Johnson and music critic Adrian Corleonis held an appreciative yet mixed opinion on the set. Johnson considered "Le jardin mouillé" (No. III) to be a "masterpiece", noting its influence from Ravel's Jeux d'eau (1901) and Debussy's "Jardins sous la pluie" (1903). He also dismissed "Départ" (No. I) and "Vœu" (No. II) as "rambling creations" and stated that "Madrigal lyrique" (No. III) has "more direction" but criticized it for sounding "too much like d'Indy". Corleonis also stated that “Le jardin mouillé” is “remarkable,” while describing the other pieces as displaying an “elaborately busy, unbalanced overloading of the accompaniments.”
