= Op. 52 =

In music, Op. 52 stands for Opus number 52. Compositions that are assigned this number include:

- Brahms – Liebeslieder Walzer
- Britten – Winter Words
- Chopin – Ballade No. 4
- Mendelssohn – Lobgesang
- Reger – Three chorale fantasias, Op. 52
- Roussel – Sinfonietta
- Schubert – Ave Maria
- Schumann – Overture, Scherzo and Finale
- Sibelius – Symphony No. 3 in C major (1907)
- Strauss – Taillefer
- Tchaikovsky – All-Night Vigil
