= Éros vainqueur =

Éros vainqueur is an opera or conte lyrique in 3 acts and 4 scenes by composer Pierre de Bréville. The work uses a French language libretto by the poet and novelist Jean Lorrain and was dedicated by Bréville to composer Vincent d'Indy.

== Performance history ==
The opera premiered on 7 March 1910 at the Théâtre Royal de la Monnaie in Brussels with Sylvain Dupuis conducting. The original production was staged by Merle Forest and choreographed by François Ambroisiny. The original cast included mezzo-soprano Claire Croiza as Éros, soprano Mary Beral as Argyne, baritone Étienne Billot as the King, and bass Henri Artus as Cardinal-Évêque. In 1918, Jane Bathori gave a concert performance of the opera at the Théâtre du Vieux Colombier in Paris. In 1932, the first staged performance in France was produced at the Opéra-Comique (Salle Favart) under the direction of Louis Masson.

== Roles ==
- Argyne (soprano)
- Tharsyle (soprano)
- Éros (mezzo-soprano)
- Floriane (mezzo-soprano)
- Lisbeth (mezzo-soprano)
- Le roi (baritone)
- Sénéchal (baritone)
- Cardinal-évêque (bass)
- Terkau (bass)
- Capitaine des lansquenets (bass)
