= Deux mélodies, Op. 19 (Roussel) =

Deux mélodies
- by Albert Roussel
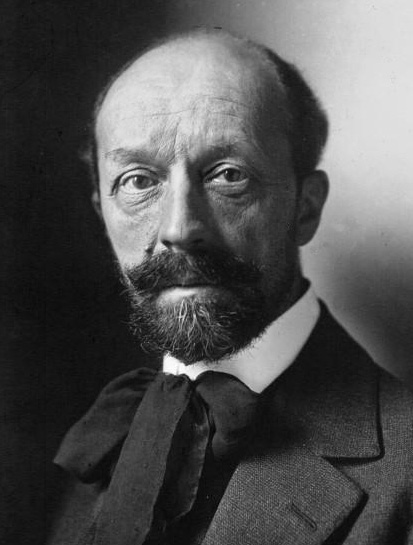
- The composer
- Catalogue: L. 21
- Opus: Op. 19
- Year: 1918
- Text: Poems by Georges Jean Aubry and Ernest Oliphant
- Language: French
- Dedication: Gaston Frager's wife (No. I); Edwin Evans (No. II)
- Published: 1919 – Paris
- Publisher: Durand
- Movements: 2
- Scoring: Voice and piano

Premiere
- Date: December 27, 1919; 106 years ago
- Location: Salle des Agriculteurs, Paris
- Performers: Lucy Vuillemin (soprano) and Louis Vuillemin (piano)

Deux mélodies, Op. 19, L. 21 (from French, "Two Melodies"), is a short collection of melodies for voice and piano by French composer Albert Roussel. It was finished in 1918.

== Background ==
Deux mélodies was composed while the composer was staying at Perros-Guirec. The first piece was written on August 10, 1918, and the second piece was written on August 17, 1918. Up to three manuscripts are still preserved of the first piece. One is found at the Royal Library of Belgium, in Brussels, while the remaining two are preserved at the University of Texas at Austin, one of them not being written by the composer but being a copy likely made by the editor. The second piece has only one surviving manuscript, which is preserved at the University of Texas at Austin.

The pieces are based on poems by Georges Jean-Aubry (No. I) and Ernest Oliphant (No. II). The poem for the first piece remained unpublished for a long time but was sent privately to Roussel. In correspondence dated March 13, 1918, Roussel wrote: "I have read with pleasure your delicate impressions of England, and I find them, like you, perfectly 'musical.' I will reread them carefully. I think that Drame or Light would fit well with my way of thinking." The poem was eventually published in the booklet Le nain vert in 1957. The origin of the poem for the second piece, however, has not been established, and it is unclear whether it was ever published.

Each piece was dedicated to a different person. The first was dedicated to the wife of Gaston Frager (whose given name is unknown), while the second was dedicated to the music critic Edwin Evans. The set premiered on December 27, 1919, at the Salle des Agriculteurs in Paris, in a concert organized by the Société nationale de musique. The premiere performance featured Lucy Vuillemin with pianist Louis Vuillemin. The pieces were published later that year by Éditions Durand in Paris. The published edition included translations into English by dedicatee Edwin Evans (No. I). The poem used in "A Farewell" is set in the original English. The French translator for this piece is unknown, although it is presumed it was written by Charles Nuitter.

== Structure ==
The set is scored for voice (a contralto in the first piece and a mezzo-soprano in the second) with piano accompaniment. It has a total duration of around six minutes. The movement list is as follows:

1. Light. Très lent
2. A Farewell. Lent – Moins lent – Lent

The first song in the cycle is a slow-moving piece in F♯ minor, set in 6/8, while the second, also slow, is in C minor and in 2/4.

== Recordings ==
Albert Roussel did not record the entire set, but he did make a recording of “Light” on March 12, 1929. It was recorded at the Studio Albert in Paris, with the mezzo-soprano Claire Croiza singing and Roussel accompanying her on the piano.
