= Deux mélodies, Op. 20 (Roussel) =

Deux mélodies
- by Albert Roussel
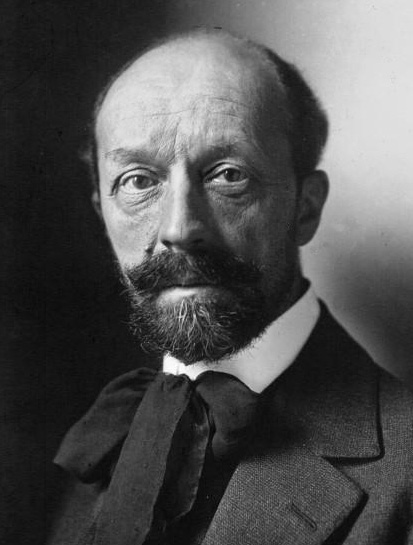
- The composer
- Catalogue: L. 22
- Opus: Op. 20
- Year: 1919
- Text: Poems by René Chalupt
- Language: French
- Dedication: Jacques Durand (No. I); Lucy Vuillemin (No. II)
- Published: 1919 – Paris
- Publisher: Durand
- Movements: 2
- Scoring: Voice and piano

Premiere
- Date: December 27, 1919; 106 years ago
- Location: Salle des Agriculteurs, Paris
- Performers: Lucy Vuillemin (soprano) and Louis Vuillemin (piano)

Deux mélodies, Op. 20, L. 22 (from French, "Two Melodies"), is a short collection of melodies for voice and piano by French composer Albert Roussel. Based on poems by René Chalupt, it was finished in 1919.

== Background ==
The Deux mélodies were composed in Paris in 1919. “Le bachelier de Salamanque” (No. I) was written on February 2, while “Sarabande” (No. II) was completed on March 19. The texts are by the French poet René Chalupt. “Le bachelier de Salamanque” was first published in the collection Onchets (1926), several years after it had been set to music, while “Sarabande” was taken from Interludes (1912). The manuscripts used for the engraving process are still preserved at the University of Texas at Austin within the Harry Ransom Humanities Research Center.

Each song in the set is dedicated to a different person. “Le bachelier de Salamanque” is dedicated to Jacques Durand, head of the publishing house with which the composer worked in the 1910s and 1920s. “Sarabande” is dedicated to Lucy Vuillemin, one of the performers who premiered the work. The set was first performed at the Salle des Agriculteurs in Paris, at a concert organized by the Société nationale de musique, on December 27, 1919. The premiere was given by Lucy Vuillemin (soprano) and Louis Vuillemin (piano). It was published by Éditions Durand in Paris in 1919, with an English translation and adaptation by Rosa Newmarch. It was later reprinted in a collection entitled Six mélodies (1929).

Roussel also made an arrangement of the set for voice and orchestra, presumably at the same time that he was writing it for voice and piano. The arrangement was also published in 1919 by Éditions Durand in Paris. It was, however, only premiered nine years later, on December 9, 1928. It was premiered at the Salle Pleyel in Paris, with Walter Rummel conducting the orchestre symphonique de Paris and soprano Claire Croiza.

== Structure ==
The original version of this set was written for voice and piano, typically for a soprano. Its performance lasts approximately four minutes. The movements are as follows:

1. Le bachelier de Salamanque. Animé
2. Sarabande. Très modéré – Modéré – 1^{er} mouv^{t} (Très modéré)

The orchestration had different scoring for each movement. "Le bachelier de Salamanque" was scored for voice, specifically a mezzo-soprano, and an orchestra consisting of two flutes, two oboes, two clarinets in B♭, two bassoons, two French horns in F, two trumpets in C, a percussion section consisting of a triangle, cymbals, and a bass drum, a harp, and a string quintet. The second movement is scored for soprano and an orchestra made up of two flutes, two oboes, two clarinets in A, two bassoons, two horns in F, two trumpets, a triangle, a celesta, and a string quintet.

== Recordings ==
Albert Roussel did not record the full set, but he did record "Sarabande" on March 12, 1929. The recording took place at Studio Albert in Paris, with the mezzo-soprano Claire Croiza singing and Roussel playing the piano.
