= Bacchus and Ariadne (ballet) =

Ballet score by Albert Roussel

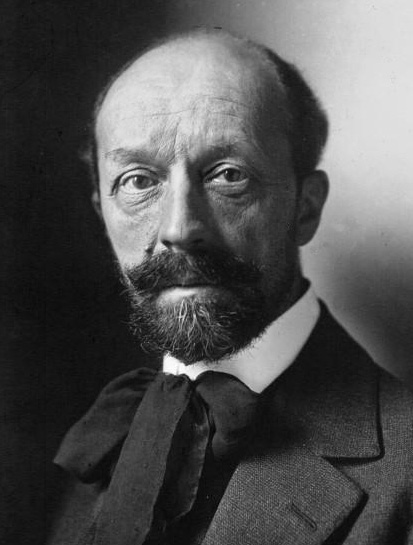
Albert Roussel in 1923

Bacchus and Ariadne (French: Bacchus et Ariane), Op. 43 is a ballet score by the French composer Albert Roussel written in 1930. A late work, the piece reflects Roussel's distinctive orchestration style and his preference for late classical rhythms and harmonies.

Its composition roughly coincides with that of Roussel's Symphony No. 3. It describes the abduction of Ariadne by Dionysus. The Paris Opera premiered the two-act work under the direction of Philippe Gaubert on 22 May 1931, with choreography by Serge Lifar and sets by Giorgio de Chirico.

== Orchestral Suites ==
Roussel created two orchestral suites from the score, the first premiered by Charles Münch on 2 April 1933, and the second by Pierre Monteux a year later.
