= Satie Quartet =

French string quartet

The Satie Quartet is a French string quartet ensemble created in 1999 by four graduate students from the Conservatoire National Supérieur de Musique et de Danse de Lyon who chose the name of the composer Erik Satie, who never wrote a string quartet.

== Composition ==
- Frédéric Aurier, first violon,
- Julie Friez, second violon,
- Patrick Oriol, viola,
- Guillaume Lafeuille, violoncello.

== History ==
The Satie Quartet won several international prizes: second prize in the Competition of the National Federation of Parents' Associations of the Conservatories of Music, Dance and Dramatic Arts in Paris. (FNAPEC), the second prize in Trondheim (Norway) and in 2001, fourth prize at the Banff International String Quartet Competition (Canada).

It shows a predilection for twentieth-century composers, without ignoring the classical and romantic works.

It performs regularly in France (Opéra de Lyon, Salle Molière in Lyon, Musée d'Orsay, Abbaye de Royaumont) and abroad, and is invited by festivals such as Les Nuits d'été en Savoie, the Musicades de Lyon, the Étang des Aulnes, Concerts de Vollore, etc. They have already been invited to play in Venice (with pianist Laurent Martin) in 2010 and 2011 by the Palazzetto Bru Zane foundation and that they return in May 2012.

== Recording (selection) ==
- Alexis de Castillon, Quintette opus 1 et quatuor opus 7, with Laurent Martin, Ligia Digital, Diapason Découverte;
- Maurice Ravel, Quatuor - François-Bernard Mâche Quatuor Eridan and Gabriel Fauré Quatuor avec piano n° 1 Jane Coop piano, Skylark Canada.
