= La naissance de la lyre =

Single act opera

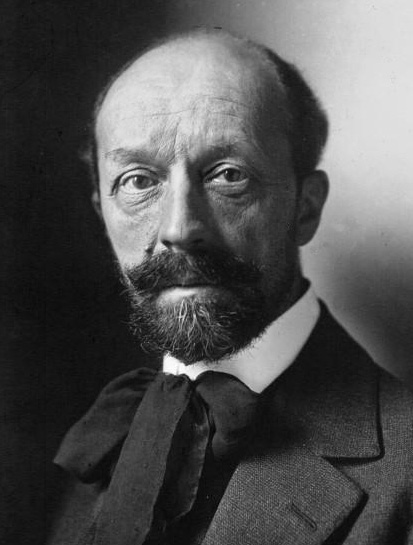
Albert Roussel in 1923

La naissance de la lyre (The Birth of the Lyre) is an opera (styled a conte lyrique) in one act by the French composer Albert Roussel. The libretto, by Théodore Reinach, is based on the satyr play Ichneutae by Sophocles. It was first performed at the Paris Opéra on 1 July 1925 with choreography by Bronislava Nijinska.

== Roles ==
Roles, voice types, premiere cast
Role	Voice type	Premiere cast: 1 July 1925 Conductor: Philippe Gaubert
Kylléné	soprano	Jeanne Delvair
Petite Hermès (Little Hermes)	soprano	Marcelle Denya
Apollon (Apollo)	tenor	Edmond Rambaud
Silène (Silenus)	tenor	Henri Fabert
First choreute (Note: choreute: member of the Greek chorus)	tenor	Georges Regis
Second choreute	bass	Léon Ernst

== Synopsis ==
The newborn god Hermes steals his brother Apollo's cattle. The satyrs, led by Silenus, track him down and find Hermes has made a new musical instrument, the lyre, from the horns of one of the cattle. Apollo is so pleased with the lyre that he adopts it as his own and forgives his young brother.
