= Jocelyn (opera) =

1888 opera by Benjamin Godard

- Opera by Benjamin Godard
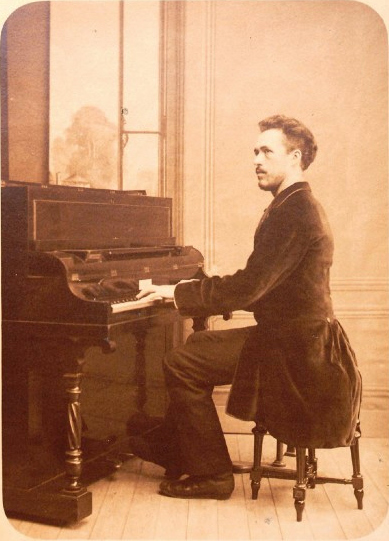
- The composer
- Librettist: Paul Armand Silvestre; Victor Capoul
- Language: French
- Based on: poem by Alphonse de Lamartine
- Premiere: 25 February 1888; La Monnaie, Brussels

Jocelyn (Op. 100) is a four-act opera by Benjamin Godard, set to a French libretto by Paul Armand Silvestre and the tenor Victor Capoul. Based on the poem by Alphonse de Lamartine, the action takes place in Grenoble and the surrounding mountains during Corpus Christi at the close of the 18th century. The score bears a dedication "A mon ami Daniel Barton".

This opera is remembered for Godard's most enduring composition, the tender berceuse (lullaby) for tenor, "Oh! ne t'éveille pas encore" commonly known in English as Angels Guard Thee.

Jocelyn premièred on 25 February 1888 at Le Théâtre Royal de la Monnaie in Brussels with Pierre-Émile Engel creating the title role. A production with a new cast, including Capoul in the title role, opened in Paris at the Théâtre-Lyrique-National on 13 October the same year.

== Roles ==
Role	Voice type	Premiere cast, 25 February 1888 (conductor: Joseph Dupont)
Laurence	soprano	Rose Caron
Julie	soprano	Storrelle
Young mountain girl	mezzo-soprano	Angèle Legault
Jocelyn's mother	mezzo-soprano	L Van Besten
Jocelyn	tenor	Pierre-Émile Engel
Julie's fiancé	baritone	Rouyer
The bishop	bass-baritone	Arthur Henri Seguin
Laurence's father	baritone	Jacques Isnardon
Old man	bass	Jules Vinche
Old shepherd		Jules Vinche
Gaoler	bass	Frankin

== Recordings ==
The popular Berceuse has been recorded by many tenors, including Victor Capoul, John McCormack, Beniamino Gigli, Tino Rossi, Edmond Clément, Richard Crooks, Nicolai Gedda, Jussi Björling and Plácido Domingo, as well as by the cellist Pablo Casals. A notable piano trio arrangement was recorded by the Eroica Trio.

== Sources ==
- Casaglia, Gherardo (2005)."Benjamin Godard". L'Almanacco di Gherardo Casaglia (in Italian).
- Théâtre Royal de la Monnaie Digital archives. Premiere cast list: Jocelyn. Accessed 15 March 2011 (in French)
- Godard, Benjamin (1888) Vocal score: Jocelyn Op.100. Paris: Choudens fils (nd.) at IMSLP
- Upton, George Putnam and Borowski, Felix (1947). The Standard Concert Guide. Halcyon House.
