= Tasso Janopoulo =

Egyptian pianist (1897–1970)

Tasso Janopoulo (Greek: Τάσος Γιαννόπουλος; 16 October 1897 in Alexandria – 1970 in Paris) was an Egyptian pianist of Greek descent, and a naturalised French citizen. He collaborated with musicians such as Nathan Milstein, Henryk Szeryng, Jacques Thibaud, Paul Tortelier, Pierre Fournier and Ninon Vallin as an accompanist.

== Biography ==
He was born to a Greek family in Alexandria, Egypt in 1897. He was orphaned as a young child and played the piano in brasseries. He went to Belgium and became a pupil of Arthur De Greef while continuing to earn his living playing. Presented to Eugene Ysaye by Greef, he became the violinist's accompanist. He met Jacques Thibaud in Brussels in 1923 touring with him that year, and continuing the association until Thibaud's death in 1953. Later he accompanied other major violinists (Milstein, Menuhin, Francescatti) and singers (Flagstad, Vallin).

From 1947 he played for Georges Guétary (his nephew), including his London debut.

His recordings include Chabrier and Fauré songs, music of Spain and Mexico with Henryk Szeryng and violin music with Jacques Thibaud.
