= Cesare Galeotti =

Italian composer, conductor, and concert pianist

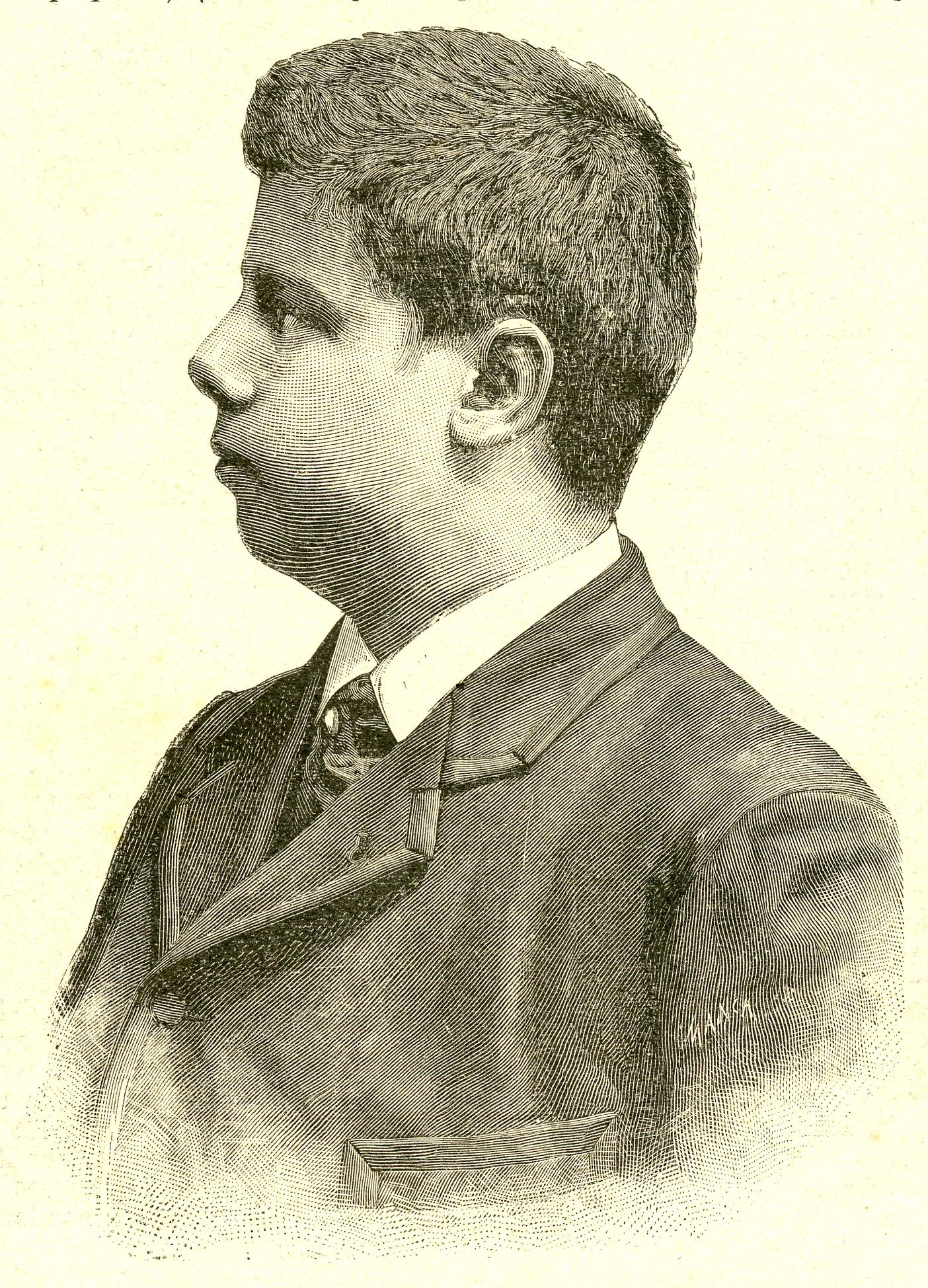
Cesare Galeotti in 1891

Cesare Galeotti (5 June 1872, Pietrasanta - 19 February 1929, Paris) was an Italian composer, conductor, and concert pianist. He is best known for his opera Anton which he conducted at its highly lauded premiere at La Scala on 17 February 1900. His other opera Dorisse premiered at La Monnaie in Brussels on 18 April 1910 under the baton of Sylvain Dupuis and with mezzo-soprano Claire Croiza performing as Alays. In addition to writing operas, he also composed a considerable amount of symphonic music.
