= Laurent Martin =

French classical pianist (born 1945)

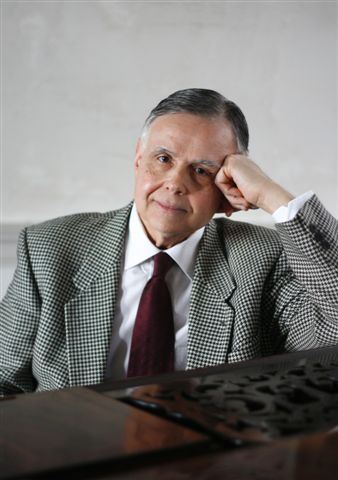
Laurent Martin

Laurent Martin (born 12 September 1945) is a French classical pianist.

== Biography ==
After piano studies with Geneviève Zaigue in Troyes, Joseph Benvenuti at the Conservatoire de Paris, Germaine Audibert in Nice and Pierre Sancan in Paris, Martin distinguished himself in several international competitions in Spain and Italy and began a career as soloist and chamber musician in 1977.

Initially confined to a relatively limited activity, he performed alone with Emmanuel Krivine in 1979 and 1980 and then with other prestigious partners. In the same way, his repertoire as an off the beaten track soloist limits his engagements at first, then, after the recording of his first 4 CDs devoted to Charles-Valentin Alkan in the years 1989-1992, his concerts have continued to develop in Europe until today. He is now recognized as a defender and specialist of the little-known French romantic composers.

This is also how he was approached by the Palazzetto Bru Zane of Venice who engages him every year with the Satie Quartet and which helps him with his CD projects. The first recording of Alexis de Castillon's quintet was thus greeted by a Diapason d'or découverte. Among his "resurrections" of composers are Alkan, George Onslow, Mélanie Bonis, Alexis de Castillon and also Napoléon Henri Reber, Alexandre-Pierre-François Boëly, André Caplet, Alberic Magnard, Charles Martin Loeffler, Théodore Dubois, Federico Mompou and Fernand de La Tombelle.

His research on female composers, with the specialist Florence Launay, also led him to perform the works of Mélanie Bonis, Clémence de Grandval, Blanche Selva, Nadia and Lili Boulanger and Armande de Polignac. In 1978, he also established the Concerts de Vollore which presents forgotten works with great classical performers in the region of Forez in Auvergne.

=== Critics ===
In Diapason magazine (2008), Alain Lompech wrote: An exemplary recording career. A splendid Chopin recital: broad, singing, coppery sound, deep basses, a rare sense of polyphony and rubato. He seems to invent music as it advances...

== Discography ==
(Selection)

- Charles-Valentin Alkan: Portrait, piano solo (Ligia Digital),
- George Onslow: Aussitôt que la lumière, piano solo (Ligia),
- George Onslow: Sonates à 4 mains with T. Ravassard (Ligia),
- Mel Bonis: L'ange gardien, piano solo (Ligia),
- Alexis de Castillon: Pensées fugitives, piano solo (Ligia),
- Alexis de Castillon: Quintette and Quatuor avec piano with the Satie Quartet (Ligia),
- Théodore Dubois: Sonate pour piano (Ligia),
- Robert Schumann: Carnaval and 1st sonata Op 11 (Ligia),
- Frédéric Chopin: Le poète (Ligia),
- Joseph Haydn: 3 sonatas for piano (Ligia),
- Johann Sebastian Bach: Bach intime - intimate vertraut (Ligia).
- Fourteen songs of Chabrier, with Erick Frelon (Ligia Digital)
