= Jean Lorrain =

French poet and novelist

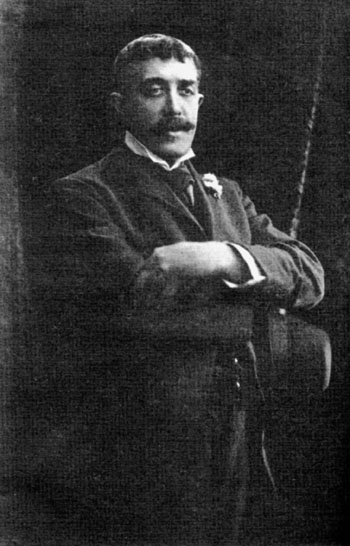
- Born: Paul Alexandre Martin Duval; 9 August 1855; Fécamp, France
- Died: 30 June 1906 (aged 50); Fécamp, France
- Resting place: Cimetière de Fécamp (Fécamp), Seine-Maritime, Haute-Normandie Region, France
- Occupations: Poet and novelist
- Writing career
- Notable works: Monsieur de Phocas; Princesses d'ivoire et d'ivresse Histoires de masques

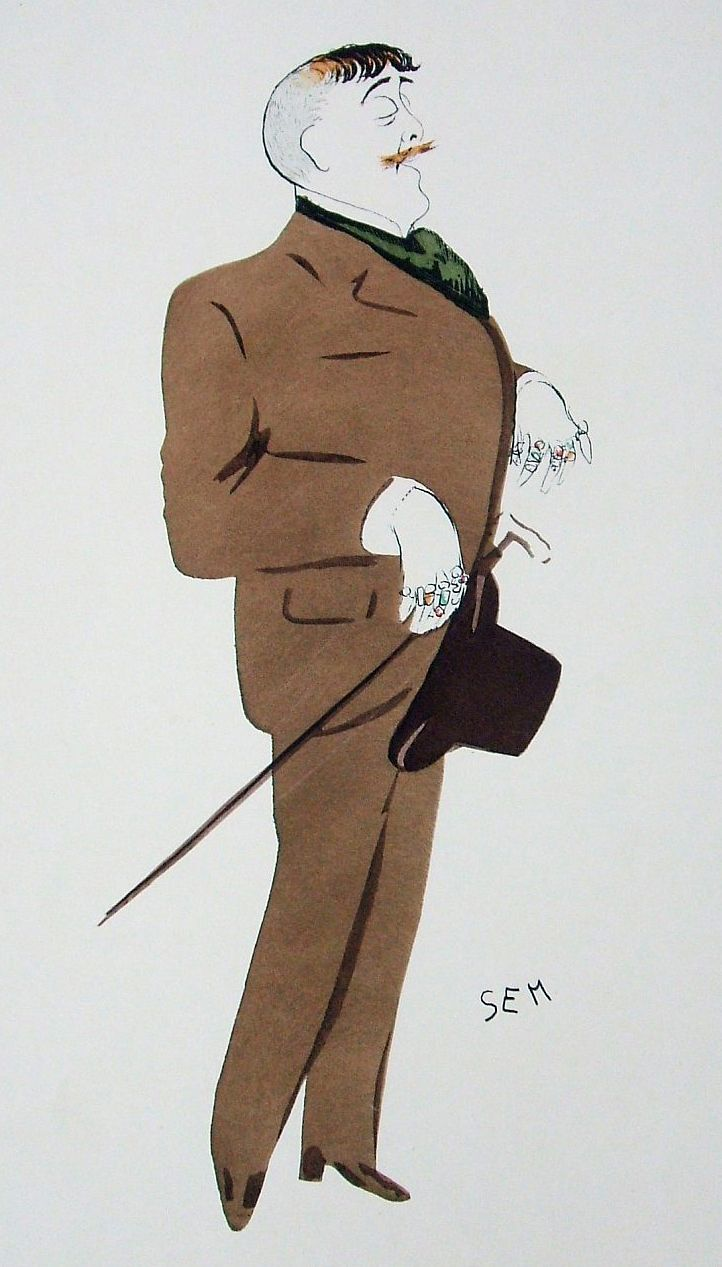
Jean Lorrain, as caricatured by Sem (Georges Goursat, 1863–1934)

Jean Lorrain (9 August 1855 in Fécamp, Seine-Maritime – 30 June 1906), born Paul Alexandre Martin Duval, was a French poet and novelist of the Symbolist school.

Lorrain was a dedicated disciple of dandyism and spent much of his time amongst the fashionable artistic circles in France, particularly in the cafés and bars of Montmartre.

He contributed to the satirical weekly Le Courrier français, and wrote a number of collections of verse, including La forêt bleue (1883) and L'ombre ardente (1897). He is also remembered for his Decadent novels and short stories, such as Monsieur de Phocas (1901), Monsieur de Bougrelon (1897), and Histoires des masques (1900), as well as for one of his best stories, Sonyeuse, which he linked to portraits exhibited by Antonio de La Gándara in 1893. He also wrote the libretto to Pierre de Bréville's opera Éros vainqueur (1910).

Manuel Orazi illustrated his novella Ma petite ville in 1989.

Lorrain was openly gay, often citing ancient Greece as noble heritage for homosexuality, and became colloquially known as "The Ambassador from Sodom".

Due to tubercular symptoms, he started using morphine, and then moved on to drinking ether, a habit he shared with Guy de Maupassant. Under the influence of ether Lorrain wrote several horror stories, but eventually the substance gave him stomach ulcers and health problems.

== Works ==
=== Poetry ===
- Le Sang des dieux (1882)
- La Forêt bleue (1882)
- Modernités (1885)
- Les Griseries (1887)
- L'Ombre ardente (1897)

=== Novels ===
- Les Lépillier (1885 et 1908)
- Très russe (1886)
- Un démoniaque (1895)
- Monsieur de Bougrelon (1897)
- La Dame turque (1898)
- Monsieur de Phocas (1901)
- Le Vice errant (1901)
- La Maison Philibert (1904), adaptée par José de Bérys, Noré Brunel et Georges Normandy et représentée sur la scène du Moulin de la Chanson à Paris en février 1932.
- Madame Monpalou (1906)
- Ellen (1906)
- Le Tétreau Bosc (1906), Le Livre Moderne Illustré n° 354 (1941)
- L'Aryenne (1907)
- Maison pour dames (1908)
- Hélie, garçon d'hôtel (1908)

=== Novellas ===
- Sonyeuse (1891)
- Buveurs d'âmes (1893)
- La Princesse sous verre (1896)
- Un Femme Par Jour (1896)
- Âmes d'automne (1897)
- Loreley (1897)
- Contes pour lire à la chandelle (1897)
- Ma petite ville (1898)
- Princesses d'Italie (1898)
- Histoires de masques (1900)
- Princesses d'ivoire et d'ivresse (1902)
- Vingt femmes (1903)
- Quelques hommes (1903)
- La Mandragore (1903)
- Fards et poisons (1904)
- Propos d'âmes simples (1904)
- L'École des vieilles femmes (1905)
- Le Crime des riches (1906)
- Narkiss (1909)
- Les Pelléastres (1910)

=== Stage ===
- Viviane, conte en 1 acte (1885)
- Très russe, pièce en 3 actes, avec Oscar Méténier, Paris, Théâtre d'Application (La Bodinière), 3 mai 1893
- Yanthis, comédie en 4 actes, en vers (1894)
- Prométhée, avec André-Ferdinand Hérold (1900)
- Neigilde (1902)
- Clair de lune, drame en un acte et deux tableaux, avec Fabrice Delphi, Paris, Concert de l'Époque, 17 décembre 1903
- Deux heures du matin, quartier Marbeuf, avec Gustave Coquiot (1904)
- 1904: Sainte-Roulette de Jean Lorrain et Gustave Coquiot, Théâtre des Bouffes du Nord
- Hôtel de l'Ouest, chambre 22, avec Gustave Coquiot (1905)
- Théâtre: Brocéliandre, Yanthis, La Mandragore, Ennoïa (1906)

=== Chronicles and travel writing ===
- Dans l'oratoire (1888)
- La Petite Classe (1895)
- Sensations et souvenirs (1895)
- Une femme par jour (1896)
- Poussières de Paris (1896–1902)
- Madame Baringhel (1899)
- Heures d'Afrique (1899)
- Heures de Corse (1905)
- La Ville empoisonnée (1930)
- Femmes de 1900 (1932)
- Voyages, (2009), Les Promeneurs solitaires, préface de Sébastien Paré.

=== Translations into English ===
- Monsieur de Phocas, Dedalus Books (1994) ISBN 978-1873982150
- Nightmares of an Ether-Drinker (translation of Sensations et souvenirs, with additional material, by Brian Stableford), Snuggly Books (2016) ISBN 978-1-943813-02-5
- The Soul-Drinker and Other Decadent Fantasies (includes translations of Sonyeuse, La Mandragore, La Princesse sous verre, with additional material, by Brian Stableford), Snuggly Books (2016) ISBN 978-1-943813-09-4
- Monsieur de Bougrelon, translated and with an afterword by Eva Richter, Spurl Editions (2016) ISBN 978-1-943679-03-4
