= Pierre de Bréville =

French composer (1861–1949)

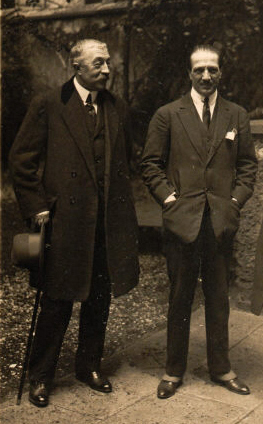
Pierre de Bréville (left) & Jacques Thibaud, Bibliothèque nationale de France.

Pierre Eugène Onfroy de Bréville (21 February 1861 – 24 September 1949) was a French composer.

== Biography ==
Pierre de Bréville was born in Bar-le-Duc, Meuse. Following the wishes of his parents, he studied law with the goal of becoming a diplomat. However, he abandoned his plans after a few years and entered the Conservatoire de Paris. He began his musical studies with Théodore Dubois (1880–1882), later taking courses under the direction of César Franck.

He became a professor, teaching counterpoint at the Schola Cantorum in Paris (1898–1902). Following a twelve-year break, he taught classes in chamber music composition at the Conservatoire de Paris (1914–1918).

He established himself as a music critic and wrote reviews and commentary in Mercure de France, Le Courrier musical and La Revue blanche. He died in Paris.

Although de Bréville was not prolific, he lavished attention to his own compositions. He also completed the orchestration of César Franck's unfinished opera Ghiselle with Vincent d'Indy and Ernest Chausson.

== Selected compositions ==
=== Stage ===
- L'anneau de Çakuntala (The Ring of Shakuntala), Incidental Music for the play Abhijñānaśākuntalam by Kālidāsa
- Le Pays des fées, Incidental Music
- La Princesse Maleine, Opera
- Les Sept Princesses (The Seven Princesses), Incidental Music
- Éros vainqueur (Eros, Conqueror), Lyric Opera in 3 acts, 4 scenes (1905); libretto by Jean Lorrain; first performance 7 March 1910, Théâtre de la Monnaie, Brussels (with Claire Croiza in the title role)
- Les Egyptiens, Ballet, an overture to a piece by Maurice Maeterlinck

=== Orchestral works ===
- La Nuit de décembre
- Stamboul, Symphony

=== Concertante ===
- Tête de Kenwark, Scène lyrique for cello and orchestra after a dramatic poem by Leconte de Lisle

=== Chamber works ===
- Sonata No.1 in C♯ minor for violin and piano (1918–1919)
- Une flûte dans les vergers for flute and piano (1920)
- Pièce for oboe (or flute, or violin) and piano (1923)
- Poème dramatique for cello and piano (1924)
- Prière (D'après le Cantique de Molière) for cello and organ (or piano) (1924)
- Sonatina for oboe (or flute, or violin) and piano (1925)
- Sonata No.2 "Sonate fantaisie en forme de rondeau" for violin and piano (1927)
- Sonata in D minor for cello and piano (1930)
- Fantaisie appassionata for cello and piano (1934)
- Sonata for violin and piano (1942)
- Sonata for violin and piano (1943)
- Sonata for viola and piano (1944)
- Concert à trois for violin, cello, and piano (1945)
- Sonata for violin and piano (1947)
- Fantaisie for guitar
- Trio à cordes
- Trio d'anches

=== Organ ===
- Suite brève for organ (or harmonium) (1896)
- Prélude, méditation et prière for organ without pedals (1912)
- Deuxième suite brève en cinq parties for organ (or harmonium) (1922)

=== Piano ===
- Fantaisie: Introduction, fugue et finale (c.1900)
- Portraits de maîtres (Portraits of Masters) (1907)

1. Gabriel Fauré
2. Vincent d'Indy
3. Ernest Chausson
4. César Franck

- Impromptu et choral (1912)
- Stamboul: rhythmes et chansons d'Orient, 4 Pieces (1921)
- Prélude et fugue (1923)
- Sonate en ré bémol (Sonata in D♭) (1923)
- Sept esquisses (7 Sketches) (1926)
- Quatre sonates (1939)
- Fantasia appassionata

=== Vocal ===
- La forêt charmée for voice and piano (1891); words by Jean Moréas
- Epitaphe for voice and piano (1899); words taken from the tombstone of Marie Dupuis in the "Église de Senan"
- Le Furet du bois joli for voice and piano (1899); words by Jean Bénédict
- Poèmes de Jean Lorrain mis en musique (Poems of Jean Lorrain Set to Music) (1899?)

1. La mort des lys
2. La belle au bois
3. La petite Ilse

- Quatre mélodies pour voix moyennes (Four Songs for Medium Voice) with piano accompaniment (1912)

1. Une jeune fille parle; words by Jean Moréas
2. Venise marine; words by Henri de Régnier
3. Berceuse; words by Henri de Régnier
4. Sous les arches de roses; words by Charles van Lerberghe

- Héros, je vous salue for voice and piano (1916); words by Henri de Régnier
- France for voice and piano (1917); words by Henri de Régnier
- Sainte for voice and piano (1922); words by Stéphane Mallarmé
- Bonjour mon cœur for voice and piano (1925); words by Pierre de Ronsard
- La Terre les eaux va buvant for voice and piano (1925); words by Pierre de Ronsard
- Ô mon ange gardien for voice and piano (1925); words by Francis Jammes
- Baiser for voice and piano (1926); words by Émile Cottinet
- Cantique de 1ère communion for soprano, violin and organ (or piano) (1926); words by Henry Gauthier-Villars
- La Cloche fêlée for voice and piano (1926); words by Charles Baudelaire
- 12 Rondels de Charles d'Orléans for voice and piano (1930); words by Charles d'Orléans
- Bernadette
- La Petite Ilse
- Cœur ardent
- L'Heure mystique

=== Choral ===
- Hymne à Venus, Vocal duo or chorus in 2 parts in phrygian mode (c.1885); words by Auguste Villiers de l'Isle-Adam
- Messe (Mass) for soprano, tenor, baritone, mixed chorus (STB), string quartet, harp and organ (1890s)
- Sainte Rose de Lima, Scène mystique for soprano, female chorus and orchestra (1890s); words by Félix Naquet
- Tantum ergo sacramentum veneremur cernui, Hymne au Saint Sacrement for mezzo-soprano, female chorus and organ (c.1900)
- Les Cèdres du Liban (Cedars of Lebanon) for mixed chorus a cappella
- Motets pour la messe des morts
- Salut for soloists, female chorus and organ or harmonium

== Writings ==
- Les Fioretti du père Franck, (1935–1938), a biography of César Franck
- Une histoire du théâtre lyrique en France
