= Sinfonietta (Roussel) =

1934 composition by Albert Roussel

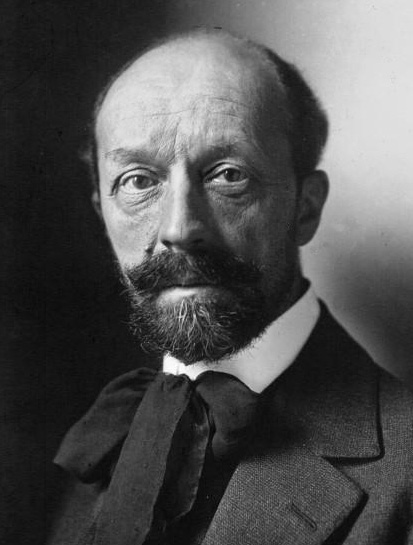
Roussel in 1923

Sinfonietta, Op. 52, is a small symphony for string orchestra by Albert Roussel composed in 1934. It was premiered on 19 November 1934 by the Orchestre féminin de Paris, conducted by Jane Evrard. It was written at the same time as his fourth symphony. The first movement is in sonata form.

== Structure ==
The three movements are:

1. Allegro molto
2. Andante
3. Allegro

The work typically lasts eight minutes.

== Discography ==
- L'Orchestre de chambre de la Sarre, conducted by Karl Ristenpart, 1955 (Les Discophiles français), Grand prix du disque 1956)
- L'Orchestre de la Société des Concerts du Conservatoire conducted by André Cluytens (EMI)
- Royal Scottish National Orchestra conducted by Stéphane Denève, 2007 (Naxos)
