= Histoires naturelles =

Song cycle by Maurice Ravel

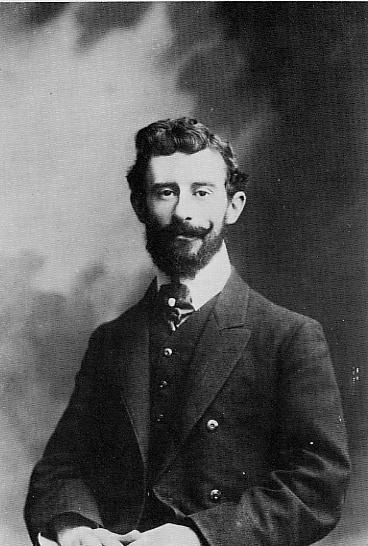
Maurice Ravel in 1907

Histoires naturelles ("Natural Histories") is a song cycle by Maurice Ravel, composed in 1906. It sets five poems by Jules Renard to music for voice and piano. Ravel's pupil Manuel Rosenthal created a version for voice and orchestra. The cycle is dedicated to the mezzo-soprano Jane Bathori, who gave the first performance, accompanied by the composer, on 12 January 1907.

== Content ==
The five songs are:

- Le paon (The peacock)
  - The peacock is described as waiting in his finery for the peahen he is to marry. She does not appear, but his vanity makes him confident that she will come tomorrow.
- Le grillon (The cricket)
  - The cricket returns to his home at the end of the day and obsessively puts it in order, before burrowing deep into the earth.
- Le cygne (The swan)
  - The swan is distracted by reflections in the water, confusing the image of his own neck for a woman's arm. Each time he plunges his beak into the water vainly fishing for reflections he brings out a worm, and so grows fat.
- Le martin-pêcheur (The kingfisher)
  - A fisherman is pleased and proud that a beautiful kingfisher has just perched on his fishing rod before eventually flying on.
- La pintade (The guinea fowl)
  - The guinea fowl is ugly and belligerent, attacking the hens and even the turkey in the farmyard. She occasionally gives them some respite when she leaves the yard to lay an egg out of sight, in the countryside.

Of the poems Ravel said, "the direct, clear language and the profound, hidden poetry of Jules Renard's works tempted me for a long time." Renard recorded in his diary:

M. Ravel, the composer of Histoires naturelles, dark, rich, and elegant, urges me to go and hear his songs tonight. I told him I knew nothing about music, and asked him what he had been able to add to Histoires naturelles. He replied, "I did not intend to add anything, only to interpret them." "But in what way?" "I have tried to say in music what you say with words, when you are in front of a tree, for example. I think and feel in music, and should like to think I feel the same things as you."

== Reception ==
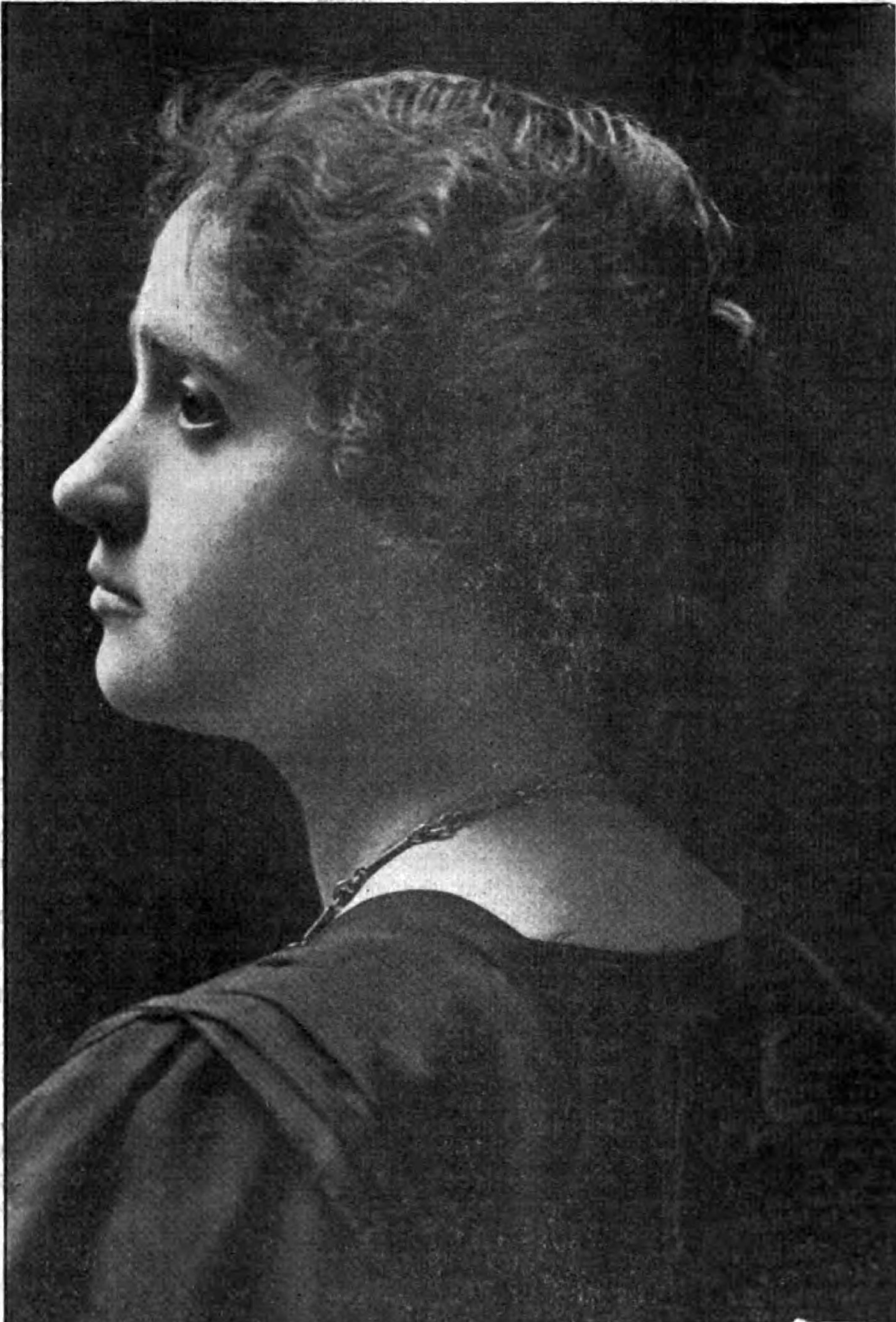
Jane Bathori, who sang the premiere, in 1912

The premiere caused controversy, creating a divide between those who regarded the music as an affront and those who appreciated its populist style. In formal French poetry recitation and singing, it is usual to pronounce schwas ('mute e's) in situations in which they would normally be dropped. In Histoires naturelles, Ravel directed the singer to drop many but not all of these schwas, offending some listeners. Others have appreciated the composer's informal approach while suspecting it of de haut en bas jokiness. Even Ravel's former teacher and supporter Gabriel Fauré was not happy with the work, though his disapproval was more of the verses than of his protégé's music. According to Graham Johnson, Fauré's reaction may also have been due to the fact that many of the audience left at the interval and that the second half of this concert included the first performances of Fauré's first piano quintet, fourth Impromptu, and eighth Barcarolle.

The Ravel scholar Roger Nichols considers the cycle "an important step in Ravel's evolution, as significant of those of Jeux d'eau and Miroirs". Johnson also quotes Vuillermoz's recollections of Ravel's own vocal mannerism of letting his voice fall a fourth or fifth at the end of a phrase – which occurs in many places in both Histoires naturelles and his contemporary opera L'heure espagnole. Some musicologists have seen the cycle as a descendant of the genre initiated by Chabrier in his four 'farmyard' songs of 1890.
