= Pierre-Émile Engel =

French opera singer

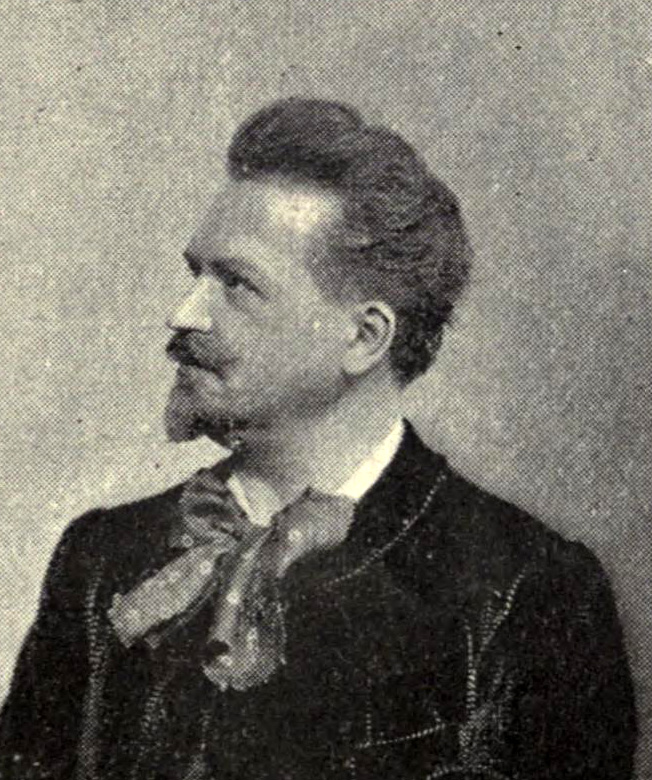
Pierre-Émile Engel

François Pierre Émile Engel (Paris 15 February 1847 – Paris 10th arrondissement 18 July 1927) was a French operatic tenor active on the stages of Brussels, Paris, Monte-Carlo and other European cities where he sang leading roles in several world premieres.

== Life and career ==
Engel was born in Paris and studied for four years with Gilbert Duprez. He made his debut in 1863 at the age of 16 in Duprez's Jeanne d'Arc. Early in his career sang at the Théâtre des Fantaisies-Parisiennes in Paris, where in 1867 he created the title role in Jules Duprato's Le chanteur florentin. He made his debut at the Opéra-Comique in 1877 and the following year there created the role of Enrique in Louis Deffès's Les noces de Fernande. In 1879, he left the Opéra-Comique and sang in other European countries. From 1885 to 1889 he was a leading tenor with Le Théâtre Royal de la Monnaie in Brussels, singing in the world premieres of Litolff's, Les templiers (1886), Chabrier's Gwendoline (1886), Godard's Jocelyn (1888), and Mathieu's Richilde (1888).

His elder son Joseph (José) Engel (born Joinville-le-Pont 13 August 1868) was a painter, who left portraits and caricatures of Chabrier; after Gwendoline the families become close, corresponding and visiting each other. Chabrier dedicated his Chanson de Jeanne to Engel.

In his later years Engel taught singing and remained in demand as a recitalist. His most famous pupil was Jane Bathori, whom he later married. The couple often sang together in recitals of art song by contemporary French composers. Ravel's "Le martin-pêcheur" ("The kingfisher") from his song cycle Histoires naturelles is dedicated to Engel as is Satie's "Daphénéo". Engel became a professor at the Paris Conservatory in 1907 and taught there until World War I. Amongst his other pupils were Louis Cazette, Louis Guénot, Françoise Rosay, and the Canadian tenor Rodolphe Plamondon. Pierre-Émile Engel died in Paris in 1927 at the age of 80.

== Sources ==
- Casaglia, Gherardo (2005)."Pierre-Émile Engel". L'Almanacco di Gherardo Casaglia (in Italian).
- de Sévérac, Déodat and Guillot, Pierre (2002). La musique et les lettres. Editions Mardaga. ISBN 2-87009-779-4 (in French)
- Girard, Victor (1998). Liner Notes: Jane Bathori, The Complete Solo Recordings. Marston Records.
- Martin, Jules (1895) Nos artists: Portraits et biographies. Paris: Libraire de l'Annuaire universale, p. 147 (in French)
