= Claire Croiza =

French mezzo-soprano and singing teacher (1882–1946)

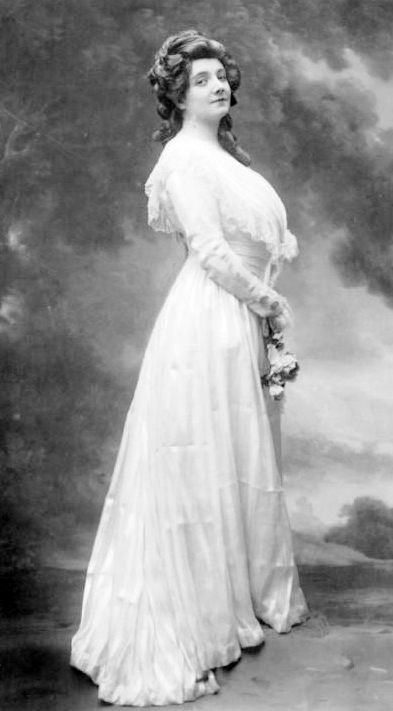
Claire Croiza as Charlotte in the opera Werther by Jules Massenet, 1907

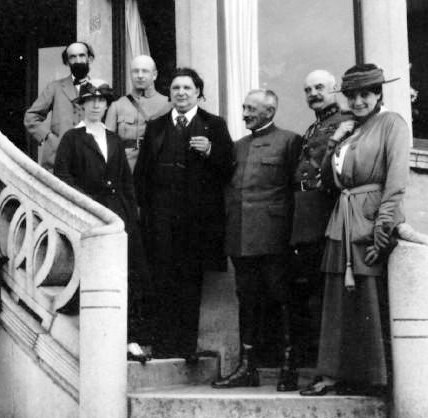
Claire Croiza (right) with the Belgian Queen Elisabeth (left), violinist Eugène Ysaÿe (center) and sculptor Victor Rousseau (top left), 1916

Claire Croiza (14 September 1882 – 27 May 1946) was a French mezzo-soprano and an influential teacher of singers.

== Career ==
Claire Croiza (née Conelly, or O'Connolly) was born in Paris, the daughter of an expatriate American father and an Italian mother. As a child she excelled at piano and singing. She was taught singing privately at first and then went to the Polish tenor Jean de Reszke for further study. She made her opera début in Nancy in 1905 in Messaline by Isidore de Lara. In 1906 she made her first appearance at La Monnaie in Brussels, as Dalila in Samson et Dalila, beginning a long association with that theatre which included the roles of Didon (Les Troyens), Clytemnestra (Elektra), Erda, Carmen, Léonor (La favorite), Charlotte (Werther) and the title role in Fauré's opera Pénélope. In 1910 she performed as Alays in the world premiere of Cesare Galeotti’s La Dorise and created the title role in the world premiere of Pierre de Bréville's Éros vainqueur at La Monnaie. It was again as Dalila that she made her Paris Opera début in 1908.

Although she first established herself as an operatic singer, she increasingly developed her career as a recitalist specialising in mélodies, and she undertook recital tours in numerous countries, including frequent visits to London where she was very well received. She had a great feeling for the French language and was always able to enunciate the words in clear and natural way without sacrificing the flow of the music. Several contemporary composers chose to accompany her personally in performances of their songs, including Ravel (in Shéhérazade), Fauré (in the premiere of Le jardin clos ), Poulenc, Roussel, and Honegger.

From 1922, she also worked as a teacher, giving classes in interpretation at the École Normale, and from 1934 at the Paris Conservatoire. Her pupils included Janine Micheau, Suzanne Juyol, and the baritones Jacques Jansen, Camille Maurane and Gérard Souzay.

In 1926 Croiza gave birth to a son, Jean-Claude (1926–2003), whose father was Honegger, but the parents did not marry. Honegger married that same year the pianist Andrée Vaurabourg.

Claire Croiza died in Paris in 1946 at the age of 63.

Her reputation was concisely summed up by a reviewer in The Times reporting on a Wigmore Hall concert in 1932: "Mme. Croiza is a supreme interpreter of modern French songs. She brings to them an exquisite sensibility that reveals every shade of meaning in the poems."

This view was reinforced in an obituary tribute also in The Times: "Her consummate musicianship, unerring in its intuition, sensitiveness, charm and subtlety, exquisite diction and phrasing, combined with deep poetical feeling and a restrained but profoundly moving dramatic sense allied to an unusually wide culture, made her the friend and chosen interpreter of the chief contemporary French composers from Debussy to Poulenc and of the poets Valéry and Claudel."

== Recordings ==
Her surviving recordings comprise over 40 titles, mostly French songs and opera extracts. They have been collected in a 2-CD set by Marston Records: "Claire Croiza: champion of the modern French mélodie".

== Bibliography ==
- Bannerman, Betty. "Recollections of Claire Croiza", in Bulletin of the Institute of Recorded Sound, (1956), no.1, p. 12, [with discography].
- Bannerman, Betty, (ed. & trans). The Singer as Interpreter: Claire Croiza's Master Classes. (London: Gollancz, 1989) ISBN 0-575-04391-1
