= Jane Bathori =

French mezzo-soprano (1877–1970)

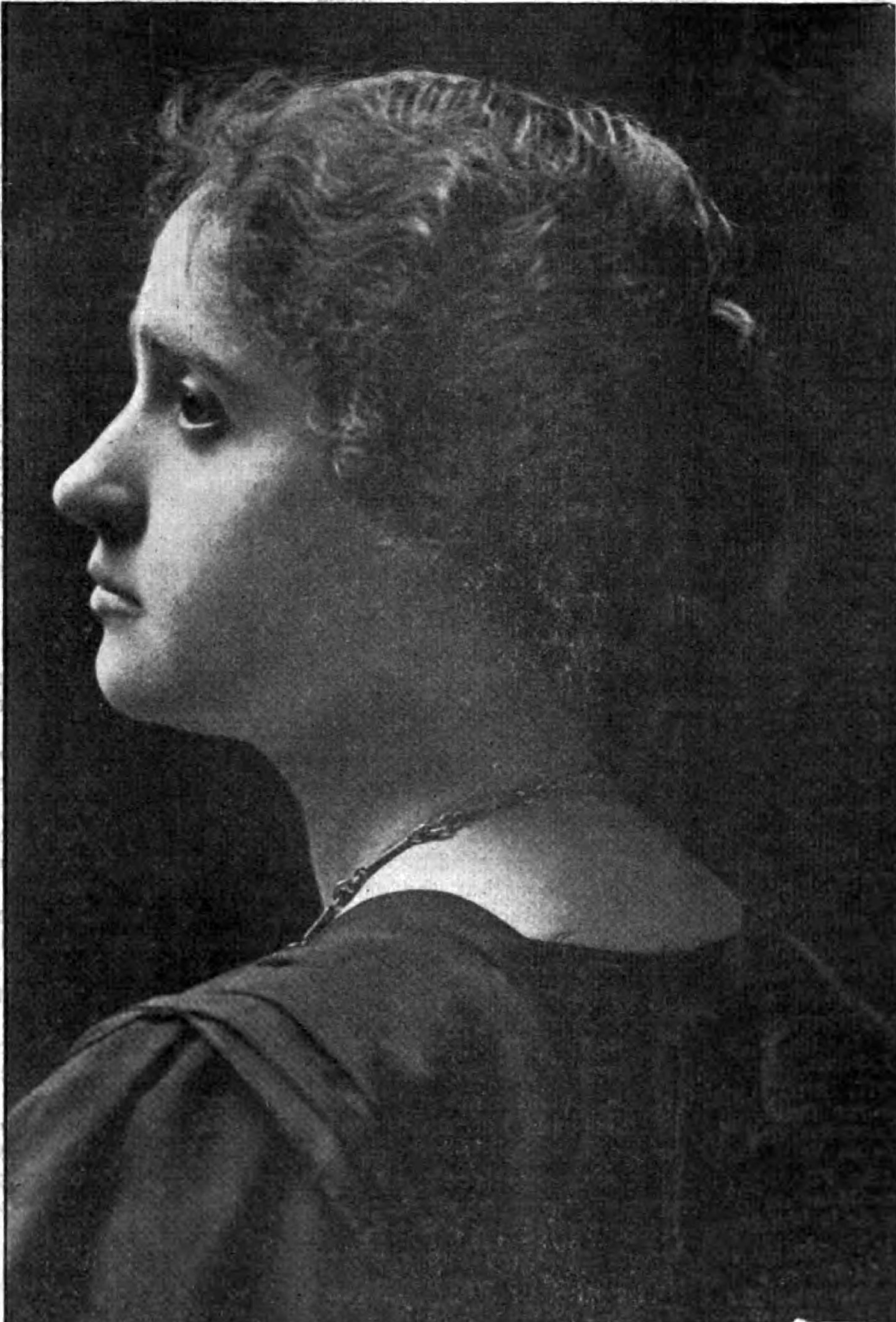
- Jane Bathori, 1912

Background information
- Birth name: Jeanne-Marie Berthier
- Born: 14 June 1877; Paris, France
- Died: 25 January 1970 (aged 92); Paris, France
- Genres: western classical music
- Occupation(s): opera singer, director
- Years active: 1898–1970
- Spouse: Pierre-Émile Engel (married 1905–1927)

Jane Bathori (14 June 1877 – 25 January 1970) was a French mezzo-soprano. She was famous on the operatic stage and important in the development of contemporary French music.

== Life and career ==
Born Jeanne-Marie Berthier, she originally studied piano and planned a career as concert pianist but soon turned to singing, making her professional debut some time in 1898 at the small Théâtre de la Bodinière in the Rue Saint-Lazare in a concert to celebrate the poet Paul Verlaine. In the same year she made her debut in the grands concerts at the Concerts du Conservatoire followed by performances in Fauré's La Naissance de Vénus and Saint-Saëns's Messe de Requiem. During the season 1899–1900 she made her operatic debut at Nantes. Her first roles included soprano parts such as Mimi in La bohème and Micaëla in Carmen.

In the early 1900s Bathori began studying with Pierre-Émile Engel, whom she married in 1908. She became celebrated for her performance of Ravel's song cycle Shéhérazade and gave the premières of his Histoires naturelles (of which she was the dedicatee) and of his Chansons madécasses. In 1917 Bathori became the director of the Théâtre du Vieux-Colombier.

In the early 1920s she played an important role in the propagation of new music of this period, especially by some of the members of Les Six, giving many first performances of their works and those of others.

Throughout the 1930s Bathori appeared every year at the Teatro Colón in Buenos Aires. In 1935 she was appointed to the Legion of Honour for her services to French music. During the German occupation of France in the Second World War she made Buenos Aires her home. After her return to France she taught singing, and gave frequent talks for French radio.

Bathori died in Paris in 1970, aged 92.
