= Études (Debussy) =

1916 solo studies for piano by Claude Debussy

Études for Piano
- by Claude Debussy
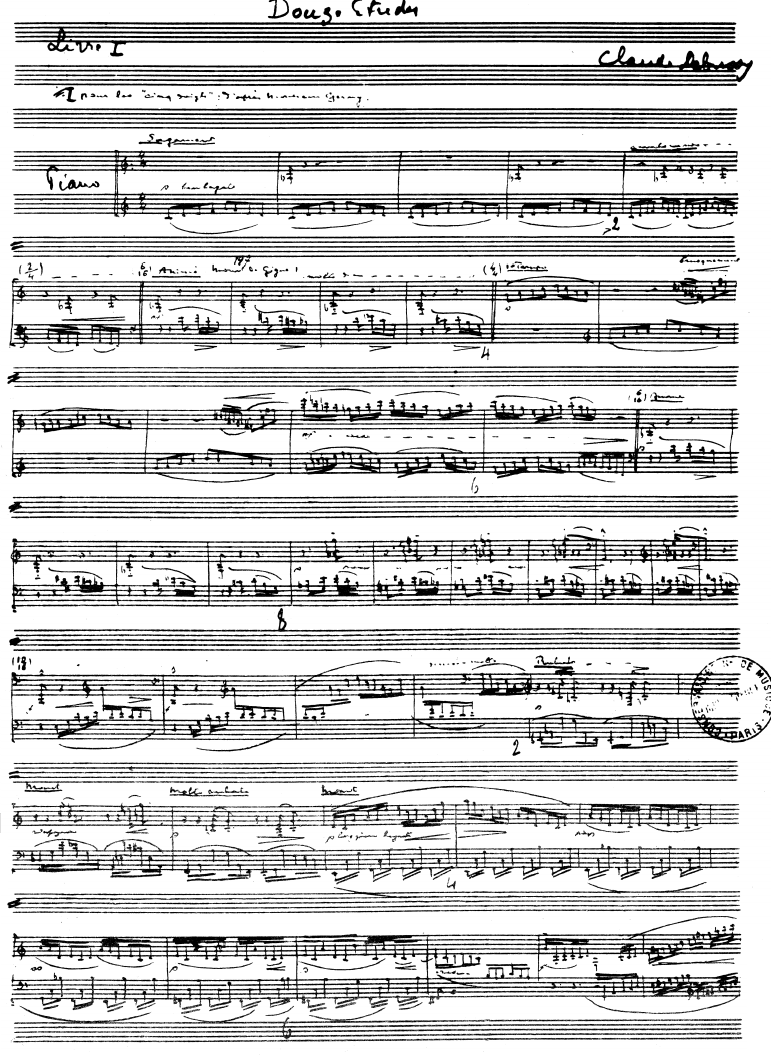
- Composer's manuscript for the first étude, Pour les cinq doigts
- Catalogue: CD 143
- Genre: Étude
- Composed: 5 August – 29 September 1915
- Dedication: To the memory of Frédéric Chopin
- Performed: 21 November 1916 by George Copeland, Aeolian Hall, New York City, U.S. (Études nos. 10 and 11); 10 November 1917 by Marguerite Long, Société nationale de musique, Paris, France (Études nos. 1, 10, and 11)
- Duration: 0:40:00
- Scoring: Bibliothèque nationale de France (ms. 993)

Premiere
- Date: 14 December 1916
- Location: Concert for the benefit of "L'Aide affectueuse aux musiciens," Paris, France
- Performers: Walter Rummel

The Études (CD 143) are the final collection for piano by Claude Debussy, comprising twelve pieces composed between 5 August and 29 September 1915. Divided into two books and dedicated to the memory of Frédéric Chopin, they were premiered partially by pianists George Copeland on 21 November 1916 in New York City; Walter Rummel on 14 December 1916, at a concert for the benefit of "L'Aide affectueuse aux musiciens" in Paris; and Marguerite Long on 10 November 1917 at the Société nationale de musique.

Composed during the turmoil of World War I, this work is characteristic of Debussy's "late style" – austere, concentrated, and visionary – as also seen in the first two of his Sonatas and the suite for two pianos En blanc et noir, composed contemporaneously.

Building on Chopin's Études and Liszt's Transcendental Études, the work addresses various aspects of pianistic technique, from intervals (thirds, fourths, sixths, octaves) and digital mechanisms in the first book, to explorations of new sonorities in the second.

== Context ==
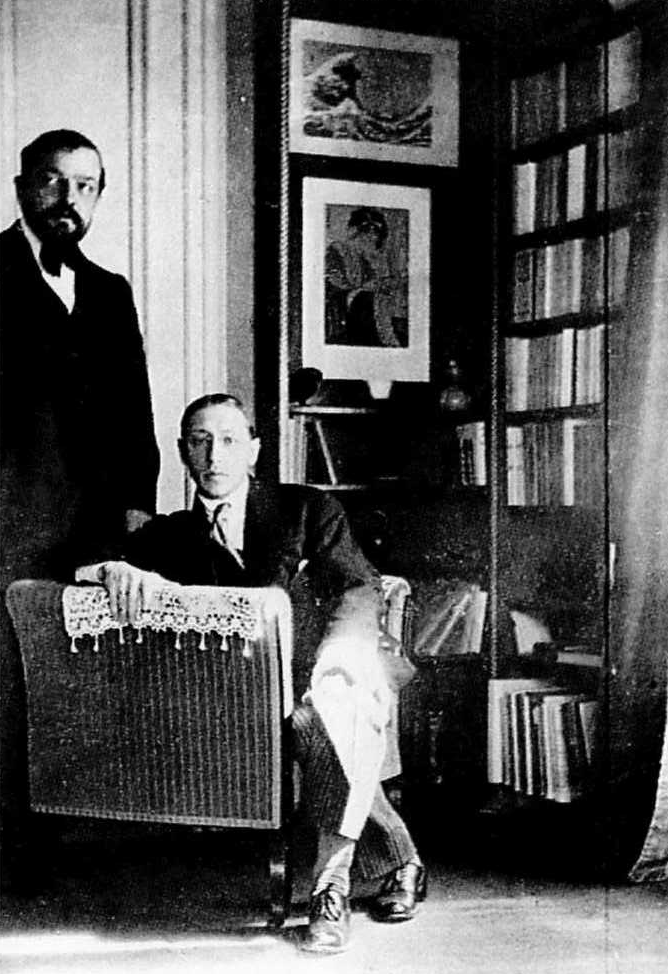
Debussy and Stravinsky in 1910

In the years leading up to World War I and the composition of his Études, Debussy faced numerous challenges despite widespread recognition of his work across Europe and the United States: Pelléas et Mélisande was performed in Brussels, Berlin, Frankfurt, Milan, Munich, and New York City. Although theater directors and concert organizers invited him to present his works from 1907, his career encountered new difficulties.

The premiere of Le Martyre de saint Sébastien on 22 May 1911 was a failure. According to Jean Barraqué, "the reception was mixed" due to the "pretentiously mystical poem" by Gabriele D'Annunzio. Jeux, premiered by Sergei Diaghilev's Ballets Russes on May 15, 1913, met with "a lukewarm, even indifferent public: some applause, some boos". This same public elevated Igor Stravinsky to prominence with the scandal of The Rite of Spring, premiered two weeks after Jeux.

Critics and audiences perceived Debussy as "declining", while Maurice Ravel and Stravinsky were "rising". Although Vladimir Jankélévitch argues that "it would be wrong to think Ravel surpassed Debussy in a kind of arms race where Stravinsky then outdid him" in exploring new harmonies, the rivalry between the two French composers peaked in 1913, when Ravel composed his Trois poèmes de Mallarmé simultaneously with Debussy's Trois poèmes de Stéphane Mallarmé. Stravinsky recalled that "in 1913, Debussy and Ravel were not speaking". Jankélévitch acknowledges that "it is possible that the hardening of Debussy's late works was largely due to Ravel's influence". Debussy's personal and financial situation deteriorated sharply after the death in February 1907 of a wealthy uncle of his wife Emma Bardac, who was disinherited. The uncle, who "always disapproved of his niece's relationship with a composer who, unlike Richard Strauss, could not earn a living, let alone support his wife and daughter", bequeathed his fortune to the Pasteur Institute. Consequently, Debussy accepted all concert invitations despite his aversion to public appearances and lack of experience as a conductor. (Note: Debussy 2005, p. 1015.)

=== World War I ===
The declaration of war on 3 August 1914 caught Debussy off guard, as he had spent the first half of the year travelling and performing incessantly to meet financial obligations. During the July Crisis, his mood swung between exaltation and despair. In a letter to a friend, he wrote of "hours when one sees little but suicide as an escape", revealing his seemingly depressive state:

For a long time – I must admit! – I am lost, I feel utterly diminished! Ah! The magician you loved in me, where is he? He's now just a sullen conjurer who will soon break his back in a final, graceless pirouette (Note: Debussy 2005, p. 1836.).

— letter to Robert Godet, July 14, 1914.

The outbreak of hostilities silenced his musical activities. In a letter to his publisher Durand on August 8, he described himself as "a poor atom swept up in this terrible cataclysm. What I do seems so miserably small! I end up envying Erik Satie, who is seriously preparing to defend Paris as a corporal". (Note: Debussy 2005, p. 1843.) Until the end of 1914, Debussy remained inactive. His depression worsened as the war continued, contrary to his hopes for a resolution by Christmas. His correspondence reflects a chauvinism criticized by biographers. On March 11, 1915, he published a patriotic article in L'Intransigeant titled "Enfin, seuls !..." comparing France and the German Empire musically:

Since Rameau, we have had no distinctly French tradition. His death broke the thread of Ariadne guiding us through the labyrinth of the past. Since then, we stopped tending our garden but shook hands with traveling salesmen from around the world. We listened respectfully to their pitches and bought their wares. We were ashamed of our most precious qualities when they smirked at them. We apologized to the universe for our taste for light clarity and sang a chorale to the glory of depth. We adopted writing techniques contrary to our spirit, excesses of language least compatible with our thought; we endured orchestral overloads, tortured forms, gross luxury, and garish colors ...

— Claude Debussy, Monsieur Croche, antidilettante.

=== 1915 ===
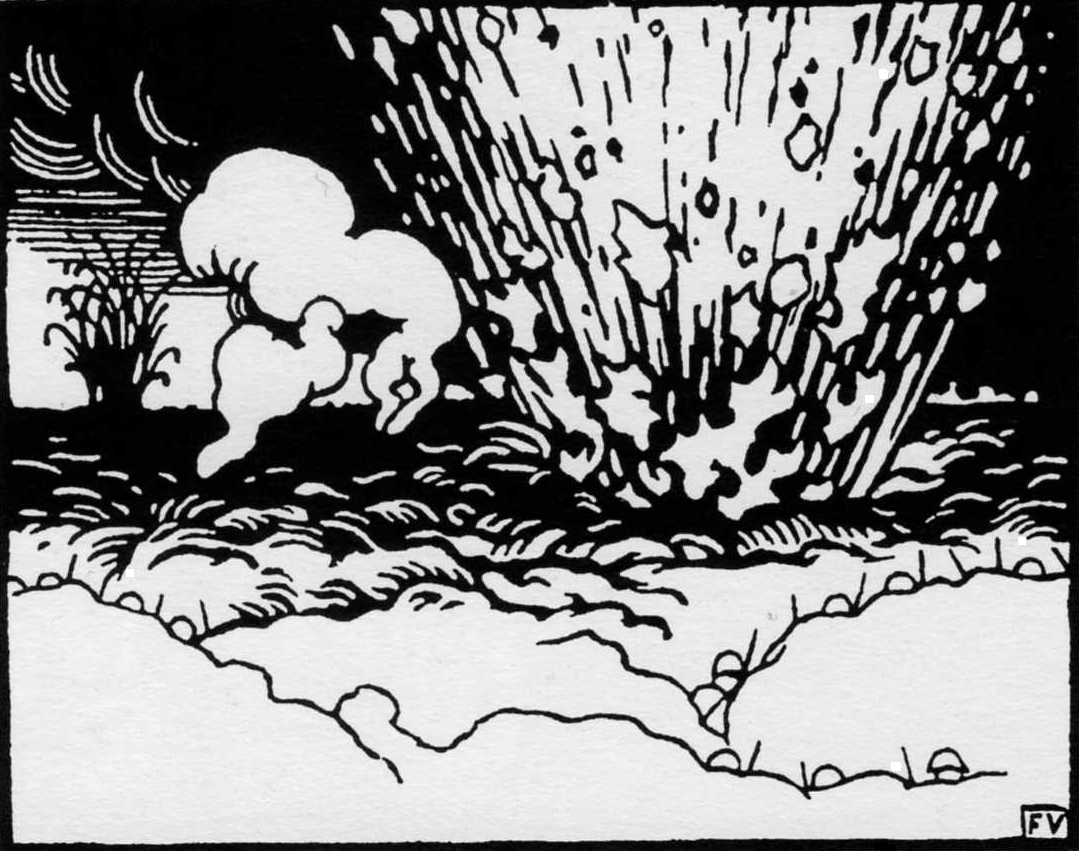
"The Trench", woodcut by Félix Vallotton (C'est la guerre I, 1915)

In early 1915, Debussy worked on a new edition of Chopin's works for Éditions Durand, letter from Debussy to Jacques Durand, January 27, 1915. With German editions withdrawn due to the war, he contributed to an original publication, consulting the manuscript of Chopin's Second Ballade in F major, Op. 38, owned by Camille Saint-Saëns.

This editorial work prompted deep reflection on pianistic technique, distracting him from his progressing rectal cancer, diagnosed in 1909, which worsened to the point where doctors recommended surgery while acknowledging its terminal nature.

The death of his mother on 23 March 1915 deeply affected him. He discussed the meaning of death in letters to friends, including Paul Dukas, (Note: Debussy 2005, p. 1882.) Gabriel Fauré, (Note: Debussy 2005, p. 1884.) Gabriel Pierné, and the young composer Edgard Varèse, mobilized to the École de guerre in April. (Note: Debussy 2005, p. 1888.)

Amid external and internal struggles, Debussy emerged from silence with bold aesthetic choices. Signed "Claude Debussy, French musician", his upcoming works were, per Gilles Macassar and Benoit Mérigaud, "war works in every sense: wartime compositions, economical, rationed, concentrating their means and condensing their effects", fulfilling a vision from 1908, when he told Harper's Weekly:

I have never understood why all music students and countries seeking original schools should rely on a German foundation. It will take France countless years to escape this influence, and when looking at original French composers like Rameau, Couperin, Daquin, and others of their time, one can only regret that foreign spirit imposed itself on what could have been a great school.

— Interview in Harper's Weekly, New York City, August 29, 1908.

=== Composition ===
The twelve Études are among Debussy's final works, composed in 1915. Ill and staying in Pourville, Normandy, letter from Debussy to Jacques Durand, 14 July 1915., he found temporary vitality. Marguerite Long, in her memoir Au piano avec Claude Debussy, recalls how

after a dreadful period of depression and "nothingness", the summer of 1915 revitalized him in what he called his vital element, the sea. He added, "I mean the infinite sea." He regained the ability to think and work. The Études were born, becoming his final message to his instrument.

Debussy composed the two-piano suite En blanc et noir in June–July, the Sonata for Cello and Piano in late July–early August, and the Sonata for Flute, Viola and Harp in late September–early October. These works share, per Harry Halbreich, "a similar inspiration and aesthetic". The Études were composed between the two Sonatas, at the explicit request of Jacques Durand, who provided a pension and sought new music in return, from 5 August to 29 September 1915. Composer and pianist André Boucourechliev reflects:

Reading the score, playing it (however imperfectly), listening endlessly, one tries to imagine this ailing man, at the end of his strength, dreaming and creating these sounds at some wretched table in Pourville... Herculean strength of that other self soaring above the daily self.

Debussy's correspondence dates specific pieces, such as the étude Pour les agréments (August 12 (Note: Debussy 2005, p. 1920.)) and Pour les sixtes (August 22, his fifty-third birthday). Musicologist Heinrich Strobel describes him as "seized by a true creative frenzy". On September 30, Debussy wrote to Durand:

Last night at midnight, I copied the final note of the Études... Phew! The most meticulous Japanese print is child's play compared to the graphics of some pages, but I'm pleased, it's good work. (Note: Debussy 2005, p. 1940.)

On 7 December 1915, Debussy underwent surgery for his cancer, severely weakening him, letter from Debussy to Jacques Durand, 26 December 1915. Jean Barraqué notes that "it is symptomatic of his patriotic fervor that his rare public appearances in his final years were at concerts for war charities". Durand published the two books of Études in 1916, letter from Debussy to Jacques Durand, 9 February 1916.

== Overview ==
According to Jean Barraqué, the two books address distinct aspects of pianistic technique: "The first book focuses on digital mechanics. The second volume proposes – and this represents an original contribution to the literature of this form – a study of sonorities and timbres", resulting, in his words, in a "true auditory anthology". André Boucourechliev offers a more nuanced perspective:

The first six Études are less about a true pianistic problem, presumed to be already mastered, than about a freely chosen principle or framework, ensuring a certain unity to their fragmented forms. One might even wonder if the title Études is not a ruse de guerre: it neutralizes the risk of excessive fragmentation under the pretext of a technical purpose.

- Book I
  - "Pour les cinq doigts" (For the five fingers), after Mr. Czerny
  - "Pour les tierces" (For thirds)
  - "Pour les quartes" (For fourths)
  - "Pour les sixtes" (For sixths)
  - "Pour les octaves" (For octaves)
  - "Pour les huit doigts" (For eight fingers)
- Book II
  - "Pour les degrés chromatiques" (For chromatic steps)
  - "Pour les agréments" (For ornaments)
  - "Pour les notes répétées" (For repeated notes)
  - "Pour les sonorités opposées" (For opposing sonorities)
  - "Pour les arpèges composés" (For composite arpeggios)
  - "Pour les accords" (For chords)

Examining the composer's manuscripts, Paul Roberts notes:

The working manuscript that survives shows the études planned in a completely different order and without the final division into two books. Debussy's instinct for balance and tonal clarity is completely logical.

In the contract signed with Éditions Durand on 3 September 1915, the announced order for the Études included different titles for two of the twelve pieces: (Note: Debussy 2005, p. 1928–1929.)

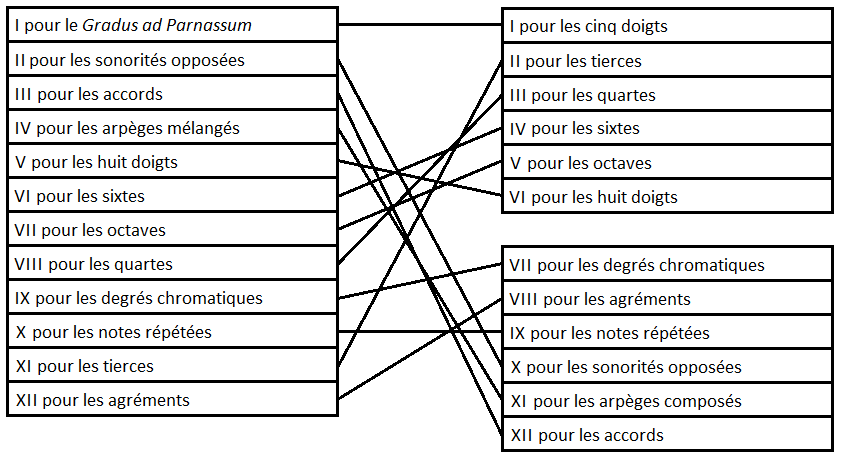
Changes to the order of the Études for piano

- "Pour le Gradus ad Parnassum
- "Pour les sonorités opposées" (For opposing sonorities)
- "Pour les accords" (For chords)
- "Pour les arpèges mélangés" (For mixed arpeggios)
- "Pour les huit doigts" (For eight fingers)
- "Pour les sixtes" (For sixths)
- "Pour les octaves" (For octaves)
- "Pour les quartes" (For fourths)
- "Pour les degrés chromatiques" (For chromatic steps)
- "Pour les notes répétées" (For repeated notes)
- "Pour les tierces" (For thirds)
- "Pour les agréments" (For ornaments)

=== References and form ===
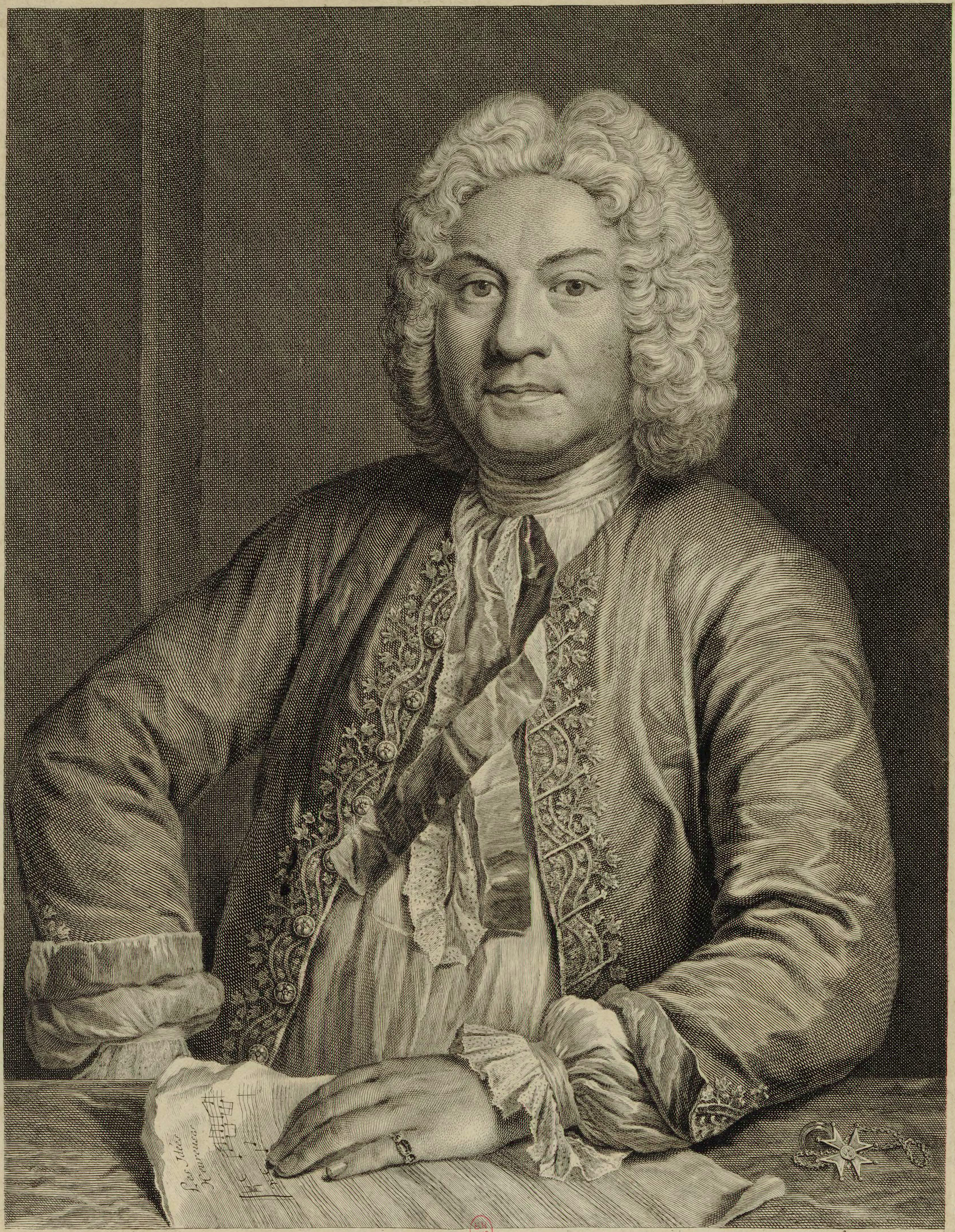
François Couperin around 1700.

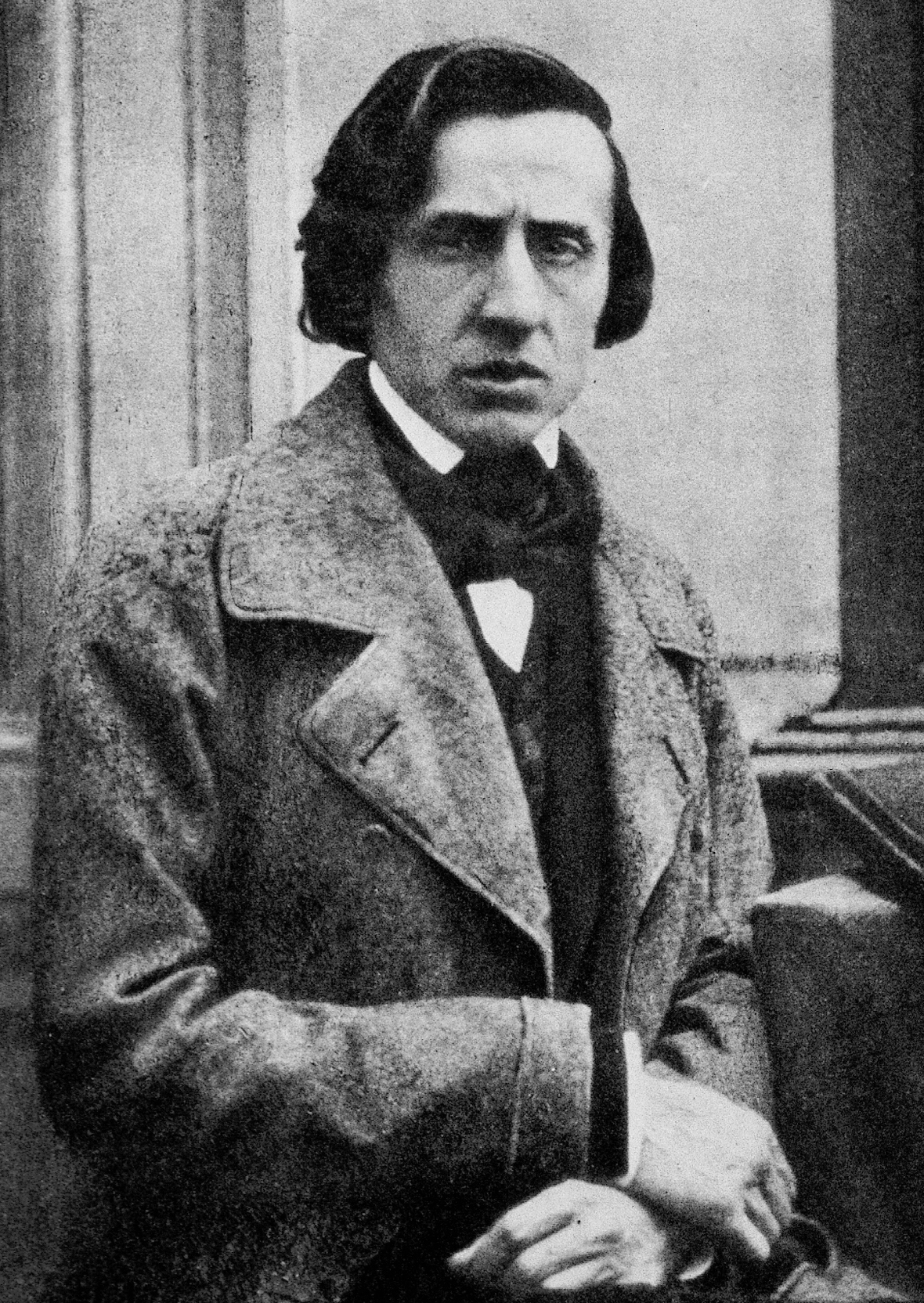
Frédéric Chopin in 1849.

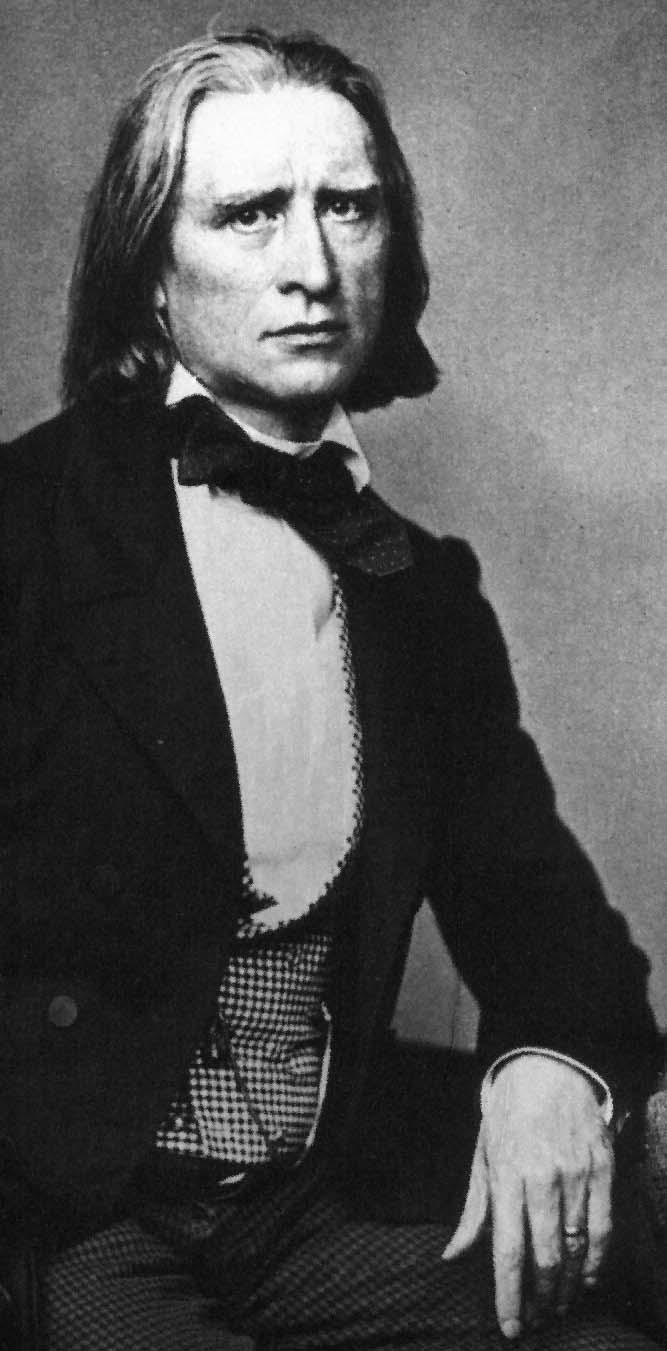
Franz Liszt in 1858.

Debussy's Études are firmly rooted in a musical tradition shaped by considerations of pianistic technique. According to Jean Barraqué, "the studies intended for student practice could intimidate when composed by the finger gymnasts of the 19th century. But Chopin and Liszt lent admirable musical nobility to a genre meant for pedagogy. Debussy embraces this lineage".

Closer to Chopin's Twenty-four Études than Liszt's Transcendental Études in their effort to "soften the hammers of the piano", Debussy's Études present formidable technical challenges while remaining thoroughly musical. In letters to his publisher, the composer stated that "these Études conceal rigorous technique beneath harmonic blossoms". (Note: Debussy 2005, p. 1921.) On September 27, 1915, he added that "beyond technique, these Études will usefully prepare pianists to better understand that one should not approach music solely with formidable hands". (Note: Debussy 2005, p. 1933.)

However, musicologists agree that "Debussy adheres to the rules of the game". Like his predecessors, he assigns each étude a specific challenge: "this purpose is upheld, explored, and executed with supreme acrobatics", with the second book addressing "not an interval or pianistic case, but a broader situation. More risk, more invention, more genius. Less pedagogy, more freedom". According to pianist Paul Crossley, Debussy "almost rediscovers, reinvents: the character, emotion, and sonority of these pieces are unlike any other in the pianistic literature, including, curiously, Debussy's other works".

Antoine Goléa suggests that "upon reflection, this approach seems curious and, in reality, adheres little to pianistic technique considerations". However, for Alfred Cortot,

from each of these dry academic arguments, Debussy extracts such a diversity of effects, so ingeniously employs the musicality of these interval sequences or deliberately identical formulas, and develops them with such independent writing and a keen sense of the piano's natural poetry that, far from seeming to solve a specific problem, these études, one after another, give the impression of translating, without rigidity, an inspiration that could find no more natural mode of expression.

== Around the Études ==
=== Dedication ===
The Études are dedicated to the memory of Frédéric Chopin – "at least theoretically", notes André Boucourechliev, as "the dedication to the Pole was omitted in the published edition". Debussy initially considered François Couperin, finding in these Études "the spirit of Baroque dance", according to pianist Philippe Cassard. On August 15, he shared his hesitation with his publisher: "I have as much respectful gratitude for one as for the other of these two admirable masters, such marvelous diviners". (Note: Debussy 2005, p. 1922–1923.) Thus, it was, according to the composer, "not without some apprehension" (Note: Debussy 2005, p. 1925.) that the twelve pieces were published in homage to Chopin, with Debussy fearing unfavorable comparisons.

According to Émile Vuillermoz, "these are pages of high technical and pedagogical value, but, like Chopin's Études, they are masterpieces of absolute music". André Boucourechliev argues that these twelve Études "have little to do with the famous Twenty-four, for while each is devoted to a specific pianistic situation, they do not provide practice material for pianists. As much as Chopin's are essential for progress, Debussy's are aimed at an accomplished musician, summarizing all they know or are presumed to know". Heinrich Strobel emphasizes that the technical aspect of the challenges posed by the Études "stands out more clearly than in Chopin. Despite their shared nature, this reflects the difference in eras and generations".

In her memoirs, Marguerite Long attests to Debussy's great admiration for Chopin's music and confirms that, rather than Couperin, he chose to dedicate the work to him:

Chopin is the greatest of all, he repeated, for with a single piano, he discovered everything !

Comparing the Études of Chopin and Debussy, Philippe Cassard identifies "technical difficulties just as numerous and sadistic, revolving around instrumental idioms (thirds, octaves, repeated notes, etc.) but never ostentatious, requiring more agility and reflexes than power and exhibitionism".

Philosopher and musicologist Vladimir Jankélévitch views the necessity of the Études project differently, responding to "the essentially innovative vocation of Debussy's music. There is in Debussy a desire not to retrace his steps, never to rely on the past, to avoid precisely the expected or predictable": "This resolve never to imitate himself and to defy expectations undoubtedly explains the disconcerting and profoundly nonconformist language of Ibéria and the Douze Études".

=== Preface ===
The printed edition is preceded by an "amusing foreword, where Debussy, with his usual irony and taste for paradox, justifies – per Harry Halbreich – not including fingerings":

A few words...

Intentionally, these Études contain no fingering, and here is briefly the reason:

Imposing a fingering cannot logically adapt to the different conformations of the hand. Modern pianistic practice has sought to resolve this by superimposing several fingerings; this only creates confusion... The music takes on the appearance of a strange operation where, by an inexplicable phenomenon, the fingers would need to multiply...

The case of Mozart, a precocious harpsichordist who, unable to reach the notes of a chord, reportedly used the tip of his nose, does not resolve the issue and may be due to the imagination of an overzealous compilerThe anecdote about Mozart's nose is recounted differently by Nicolas Slonimsky in his Slonimsky's Book of Musical Anecdotes, while acknowledging it lacks precise corroboration:

One day, Mozart taunted Haydn that the latter would never be able to play a piece which Mozart had just written. Haydn sat at the harpsichord, began to play from the manuscript, then stopped abruptly. There was a note in the center of the keyboard while the right hand was playing in high treble and the left hand in low bass.

– Nobody can play this with two hands, Haydn exclaimed.

– I can, Mozart said quietly.

When he reached the debated portion of his composition, he bent over and struck the central note with his nose.

– With a nose like yours, Haydn conceded, it becomes easier

.

One day, Mozart made a bet with Haydn that he could not play a piece he had just composed. Haydn sat at the harpsichord, began playing from the manuscript, and stopped abruptly. There was a note in the middle of the keyboard while the right hand played in the high register and the left in the low.

– No one can play this with two hands, Haydn exclaimed.

– I can, Mozart replied calmly.

When he reached the contested passage, he leaned forward and struck the middle note with his nose.

– With a nose like yours, Haydn admitted, it becomes easier.

Our old Masters, – I mean "our" admirable harpsichordists – never indicated fingerings, likely trusting in the ingenuity of their contemporaries. To doubt that of modern virtuosos would be improper.

In conclusion: the absence of fingering is an excellent exercise, it curbs the contrarian spirit that drives us to ignore the composer's fingering, and it verifies the eternal saying: "One is never better served than by oneself."

Let us find our own fingerings!

C.D.

These final words inspire Vladimir Jankélévitch to comment:

Let us find our own fingerings! writes Debussy at the start of his Douze Études for piano. This amounts to saying: figure it out! Do what you can. There are no taboos... Everything is permitted, as long as a new music is at stake, as a new message is delivered.

André Boucourechliev sees a caution in this:

The Études, while presupposing a great pianist, do not grant the performer a margin of freedom unique to them, for the simple reason that this freedom is already claimed by the composer himself. Any deviation from the text risks slipping into a romanticism that this text rejects.

== Commented Études ==
According to Jean Barraqué, "in terms of pianistic technique, the Préludes and Images innovate far less than the Études". This final collection has prompted numerous commentaries, beyond biographies or monographs dedicated to Claude Debussy, before becoming the subject of more in-depth studies.

=== Book I ===
==== 1. Pour les cinq doigts (For the five fingers), after Mr. Czerny ====
Pour les cinq doigts, Walter Gieseking (1954)

Vladimir Jankélévitch comments on the "abruptness" of these opening measures: "an explosion of violence". The first étude, Pour les cinq doigts, begins "quite properly, as if 'at 9 o'clock in the morning', as Erik Satie might say, the hour when model little girls practice their scales on the white keys. Measures 3–6 are shown below.

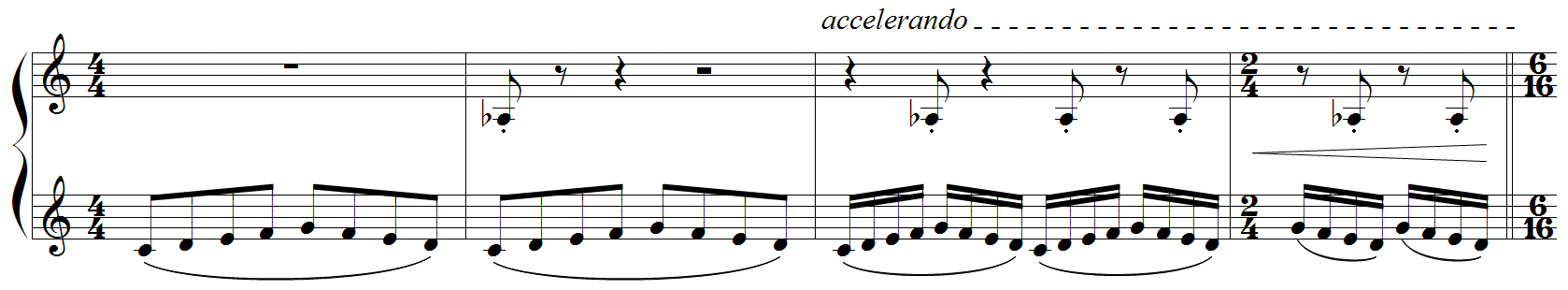

"What is this impertinent and indiscreet A-flat that suddenly jars and insists brazenly, impatiently, beneath the five notes in C major? It's the genius of the spelling mistake and the inkblot that derailed the pensum". Marguerite Long, working on this étude with the composer, notes the "mockery" of the opening measures where the right hand plucks the A-flat "like a fingernail, like a guitar pick, a way of 'plucking' that made the Master say, with a glint of amusement in his eyes: – Gotcha!"

Thus, Harry Halbreich considers that

this ironic homage to the old master of piano mechanics – written without leaps or thumb passages – possesses the carefree humor of Doctor Gradus ad Parnassum. In the first piece of the collection titled Children's Corner (1908), Debussy alludes to the Gradus ad Parnassum (Stairway to Parnassus) by Muzio Clementi, another classic master for beginner pianists.. The five initial notes of the C major scale are "pricked" with irreverent dissonances. Czerny keeps trying to reassert himself, only to be disrupted by Debussy's capricious sarcasms: we quickly abandon the proper and bland school exercise for a dazzling scherzo (animé, gigue movement, 6/16), whose nonchalance does not exclude the hint of bitterness characteristic of the late Debussy

==== 2. Pour les tierces (For thirds) ====
Pour les tierces, Walter Gieseking (1954)

Christian Goubault first notes the "continuous writing of thirds, predominantly in the right hand, very different from that of the prelude Les Tierces alternées", which in 1912 was "an étude in all but name". In this renewed context, André Boucourechliev admires "the rigor of the writing: not a single sound in the main voice that isn't or doesn't contain a third". The third, representing, in his view, "the quintessential tonal interval", this étude reveals "a nostalgic and languorous Debussy, the soft consonances of thirds in D-flat major lending themselves to these romantic effusions." The opening is shown below.

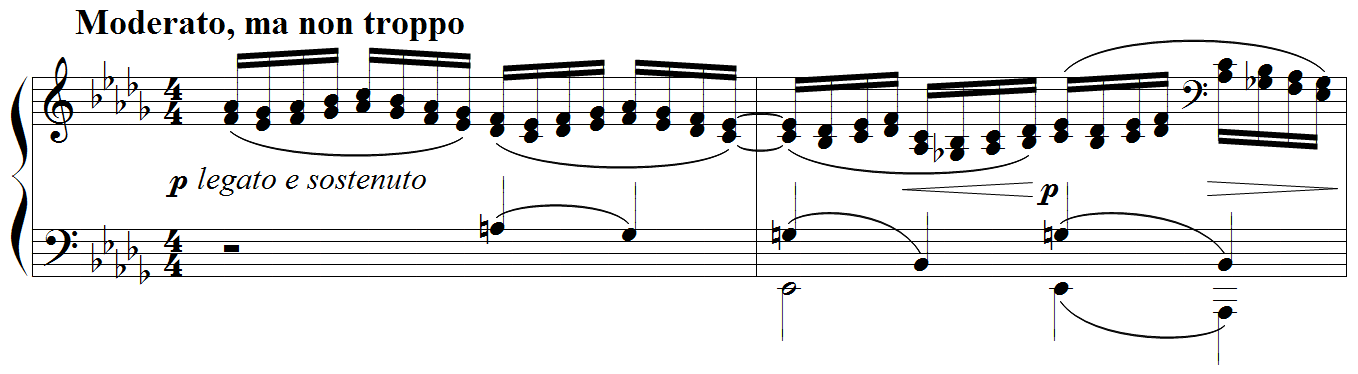

The expression gradually intensifies, reaching "a passionate outburst, almost Brahmsian, con fuoco, abruptly cut off by the merciless conclusion in B-flat minor". Harry Halbreich also notes that "the uncompromising requirement of legato e sostenuto makes the piece particularly demanding for the performer". Vladimir Jankélévitch comments on this progression:

Something grows impatient, agitated, and unleashed in the final coda of the étude. Pour les tierces: both hands hammer the keys with furious insistence; a murmurando full of menace, heralding the moment when the pianissimo will erupt into fortissimo, foreshadows this explosion of violence. It is hunted, the étude for thirds. And so is the étude for five fingers.

Christian Goubault compares this piece to Chopin's Étude Op. 25, No. 6, dedicated to the same interval. However, Debussy's tempo is more moderate, "suggesting that the composer was aware of the limits of his own virtuosity and intended to perform his own pieces".

==== 3. Pour les quartes (For fourths) ====
Pour les quartes, Walter Gieseking (1954)

This étude "is nominally in F major – at least that is its key signature". André Boucourechliev observes that "all F's are absent from the initial statement. But the étude is exemplary as a study of sonorities. The subsequent rupture resonates far, before descending in three stages." Measures 7–9 are shown below.

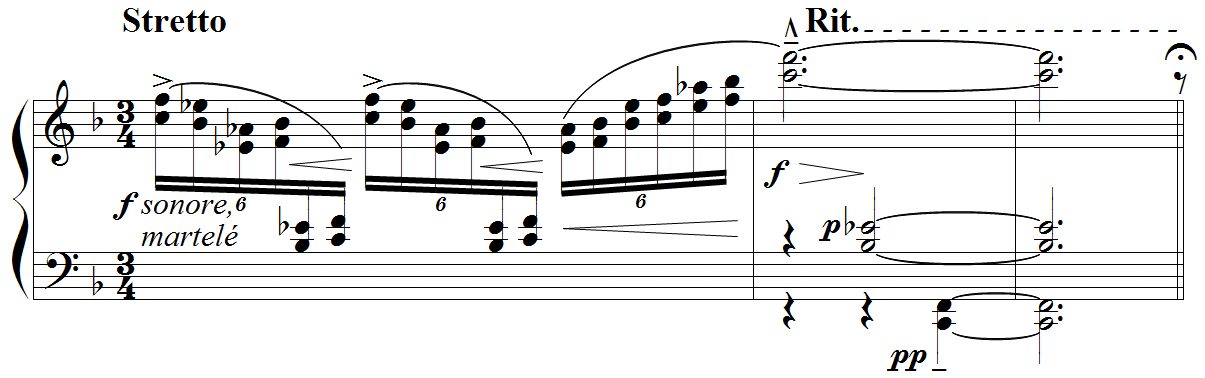

Debussy wrote to his publisher on August 28, 1915, that some Études were dedicated "to exploring special sonorities, including Pour les quartes – so neglected, where you will find the unheard". Harry Halbreich describes these sonorities as "cold and somewhat lunar, determined by the presence of this anti-romantic and anti-tonal interval, occasionally lit by the harsh light of the tritone". The "unheard" quality of this piece, with its great formal freedom, aligns it with the late piano works of Alexander Scriabin, who had recently died, while anticipating the future scores of Olivier Messiaen. Thus, "the étude Pour les quartes serves as the key to the entire first book, just as Pour les sonorités opposées is the key to the second". Antoine Goléa clarifies that "the fourth is one of the three 'just' intervals of all modal music, and the inversion of the fifth". According to him, "this is certainly why Debussy did not compose an étude for fifths, though technically, it would have presented a different challenge from that posed by fourths".

==== 4. Pour les sixtes (For sixths) ====
Pour les sixtes, Walter Gieseking (1954)

André Boucourechliev notes that "Debussy softens a bit. He revels in the sonority of sixths in all possible contexts and registers". Indeed, the composer wrote to his publisher on August 28, 1915, that "the concern for the sixth extends to constructing harmonies solely from the aggregation of these intervals, and it's not unattractive!" Measures 13–15 are shown below.

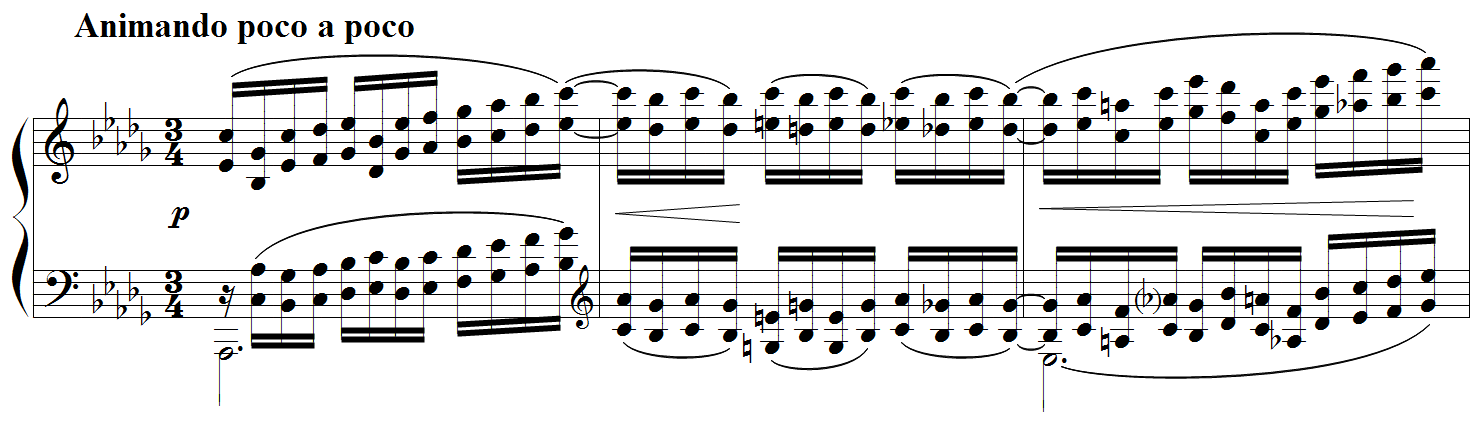

Debussy confided that "for a long time, the continuous use of sixths felt to me like pretentious young ladies sitting in a salon, sullenly embroidering, envying the scandalous laughter of mad ninths..." which leads Harry Halbreich to clarify that "their propriety is heavy with restrained desire, and this piece has a warmth and tenderness quite different from what the composer's biting comment might suggest". For Roland de Candé, "the warm fullness of the sixths (in both hands) forms a happy contrast with the previous étude".

==== 5. Pour les octaves (For octaves) ====
Pour les octaves, Walter Gieseking (1954)

This lively, brilliant, and joyful piece is "one of the rare études where unclouded joy prevails", according to Harry Halbreich, who compares its "sovereign freedom of writing" to the suite En blanc et noir for two pianos. André Boucourechliev sees in this étude only "the unnecessary feat, the difficulty ''per se''", specifying that the writing in octaves aims for "the conquest of a total and open, discontinuous space." Measures 72–76 are shown below.

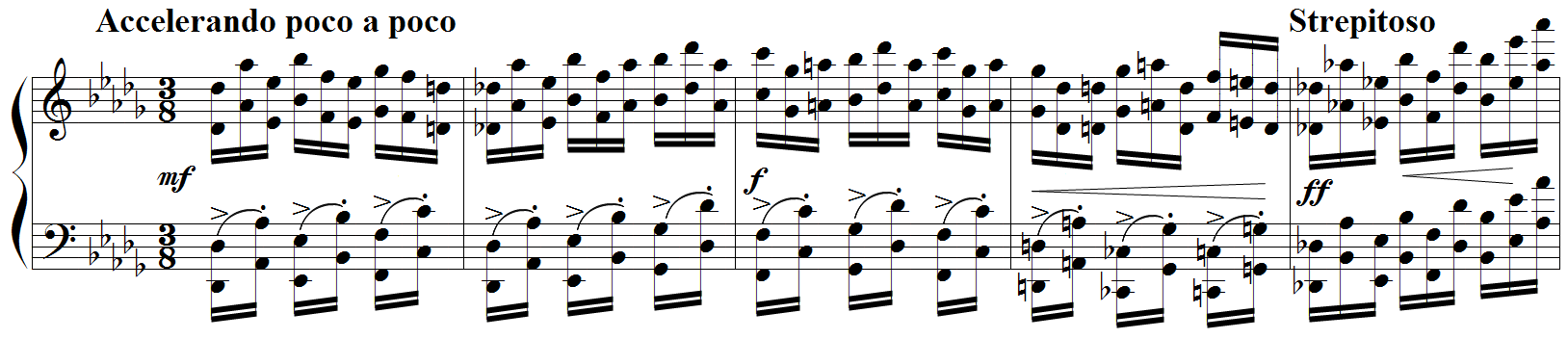

Debussy rarely employed the technique of playing in octaves, except in the prelude Feux d'artifice from 1912, also very Lisztian. However, pianist Claude Helffer detects "traits close to those of Chabrier, an elastic and swirling waltz rhythm", which Paul Roberts connects to The Waltz, a bronze by Camille Claudel that Debussy kept on his desk. Roland de Candé notes that "one forgets the octaves, so colorful is the harmonic filling. The central section, in the style of the trio in classical scherzos, offers an excellent contrast with its calm sobriety" – an opinion shared by Harry Halbreich:

So many thirds and other filling intervals are added to the octaves (except in the central section, whose delicate sonic and dynamic spareness is intentional for contrast) that, musically, one completely forgets the technical pretext of the piece.

==== 6. Pour les huit doigts (For eight fingers) ====
Pour les huit doigts, Walter Gieseking (1954)

This étude, in "perpetual motion with consistently muted dynamics", "poetically reinvents a sonic material reduced to the minimum", excludes the use of thumbs. According to Debussy himself, "in this étude, the changing hand positions make the use of thumbs inconvenient, and its execution would become acrobatic".

According to André Boucourechliev, "this étude is composed of one sound across several pages, close to the speed of sound. The thumbs are excluded – too heavy and too short" for this étude where Vladimir Jankélévitch hears a "true flight of the bumblebee". Marguerite Long says:

The temptation became too strong for me, and the result too satisfying, so I hastened to disobey ("Let us find our own fingerings!" said the preface). Given the success of the fait accompli, the composer could only applaud and – forgive my bad pun – also put up his thumbs.

The étude is based on "the ultra-rapid alternation of the two hands, chaining groups of four sounds with elusive virtuosity", according to Harry Halbreich. The harmony, "completely freed from tonality, arises solely from melodic undulations, splashing the keyboard with a thousand fine droplets reflecting the sun as through a prism." Measures 54–55 are shown below.

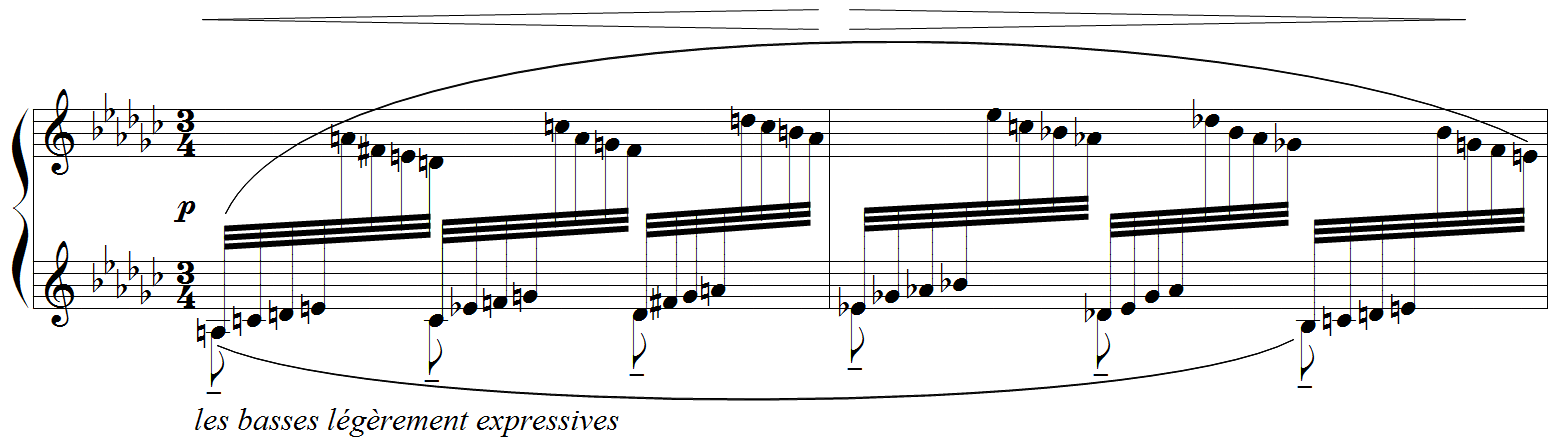

Vladimir Jankélévitch also focuses on this "deluge of tiny notes on the black and white keys. In the étude Pour les huit doigts and at the end of Pour les agréments, the tiny notes disintegrate and fall like rain". The philosopher thus defines the unity of this first Book in terms of a sensory atmosphere: "the austere grayness of Autumn envelops both the étude Pour les cinq doigts, a homage to Mr. Czerny, and the étude Pour les huit doigts".

=== Book II ===
==== 7. Pour les degrés chromatiques (For chromatic steps) ====
Pour les degrés chromatiques, Walter Gieseking (1954)

This étude, "technically and musically quite close to the previous one", according to Harry Halbreich, combines "a stubborn, well-defined theme with a swirling swarm of triplet sixteenth notes in chromatic groups, in a totally free, fairy-like universe, neither tonal, nor modal, nor atonal. The questioning ending is a 'perhaps' open to infinite possibilities". Roland de Candé suggests "it can be described as 'pantonale', where the ear should not distinguish each note but perceive a continuous sonic movement without tonal polarity".

Vladimir Jankélévitch links the "chromaticism of this seventh étude to the Épigraphes antiques: does it not, in its way, give thanks to the morning rain?" – the melody "emerging from a kind of sonic silence." Measures 11–14 are shown below.

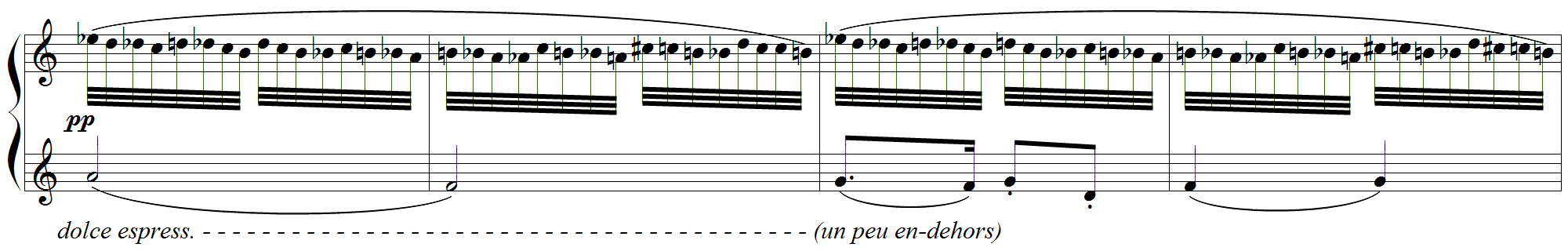

For Guy Sacre, "it anticipates the impalpable rustlings, wing flutters, and elytra sounds that Bartók would fill his night music". André Boucourechliev emphasizes the extreme difficulty of performing this étude. When the left hand "ventures to play triplet sixteenth notes itself, it creates a rupture and problems for the pianist." Measures 59–60 are shown below.

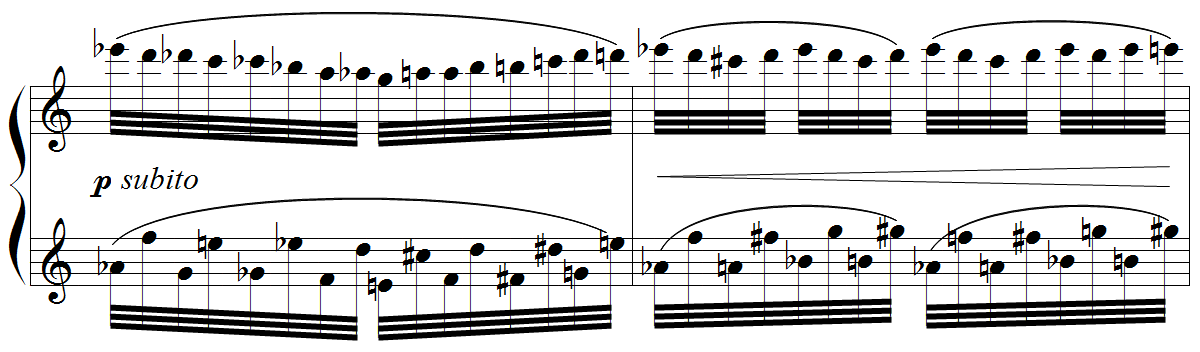

==== 8. Pour les agréments (For ornaments) ====
Pour les agréments, Walter Gieseking (1954)

Of this étude, Debussy said it "borrows the form of a barcarolle on a somewhat Italian sea". André Boucourechliev sees it as

one of the most complex attempts at compartmentalized and discontinuous forms: nothing lasts here, neither a sound (broken, mimicking an ornament), nor the types of structures, nor the rhythms – it is one of Debussy's richest works in this regard.

Harry Halbreich also notes "the rhythmic and agogic structure, of extraordinary flexibility, within a very slow 6/8, while the tonality of F major remains fairly perceptible" at the beginning and end of the piece. Among the enchantments of a writing where melody and rhythm "are instantly replaced by a new idea", André Boucourechliev highlights two measures where "bursts of timbral perfumes emerge, with superimposed irrational rhythms." Measure 33 is shown below.

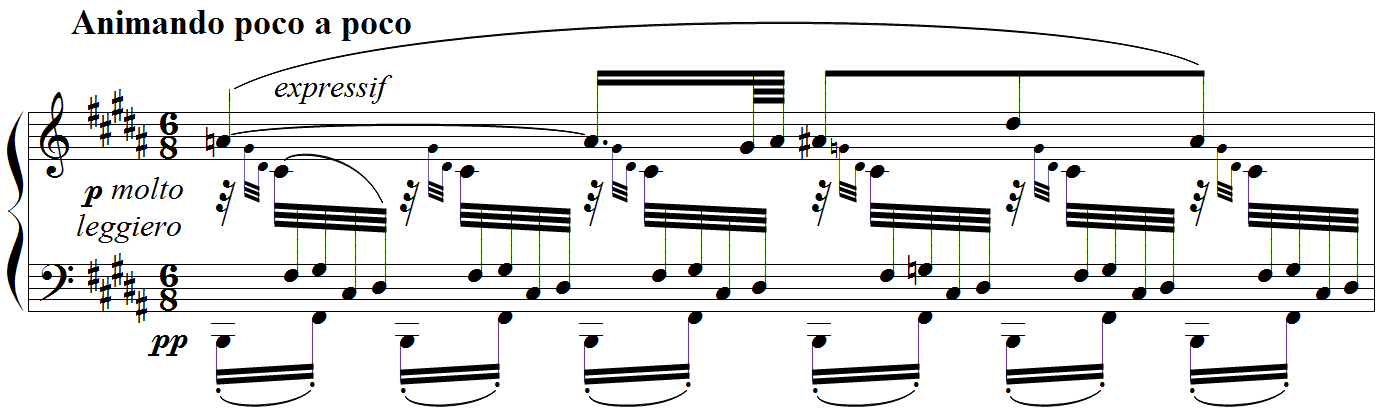

For Harry Halbreich, the technical difficulties peak in the two following measures (mm. 35–36) in 5/8, with their rapid parallel chords in the right hand.

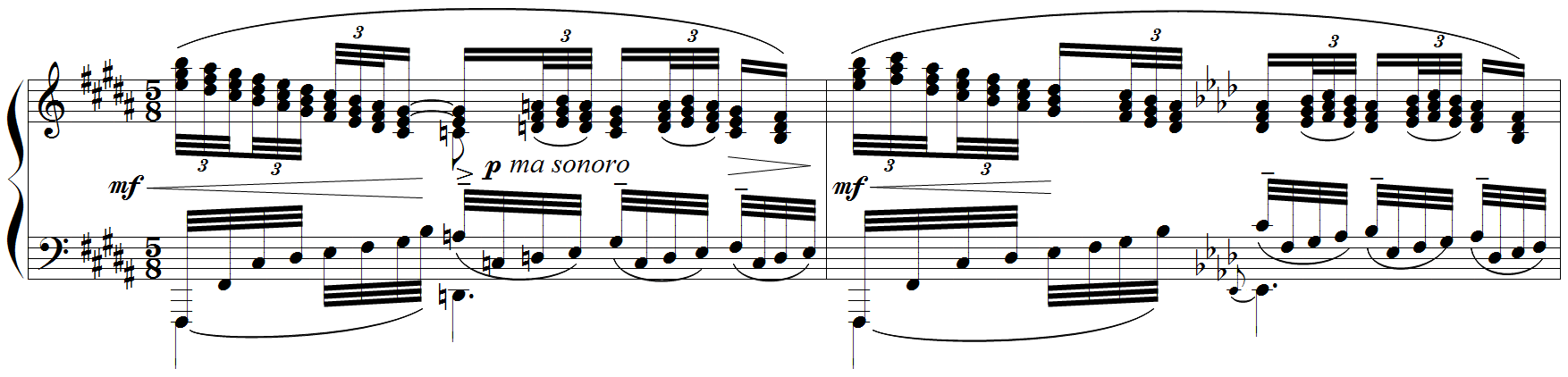

==== 9. Pour les notes répétées (For repeated notes) ====
Pour les notes répétées, Walter Gieseking (1954)

Frank Dowe attributes to this piece, with its stuttering, virtually atonal opening, a memory of General Lavine and the music hall, as well as a foretaste of the fragmentation by Webern and his successors. Harry Halbreich recalls that the technique of repeated notes, illustrated by this humorous toccata, remains "typically Western, especially French (the harpsichordists) and obviously Spanish (Scarlatti, the guitar)." The opening is shown below.

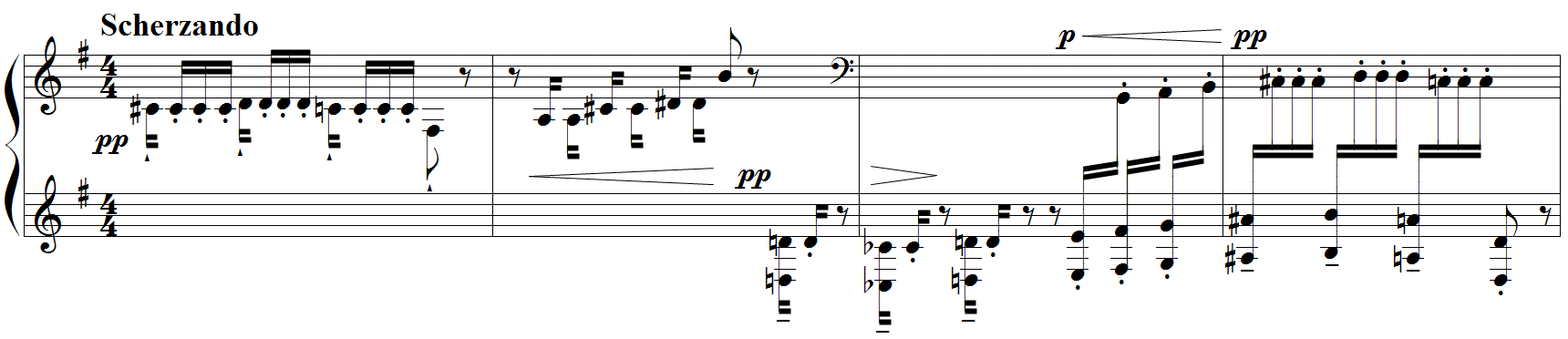

According to Vladimir Jankélévitch, "the dissonant sonority ripples and bristles tremulously in the études for chromatic steps and repeated notes: thrown in staccato, the two adjacent notes vibrate fiercely against each other". In its technique and precision, it "matches the sharp, crisp dryness of an Stravinsky." Measures 40–43 are shown below.

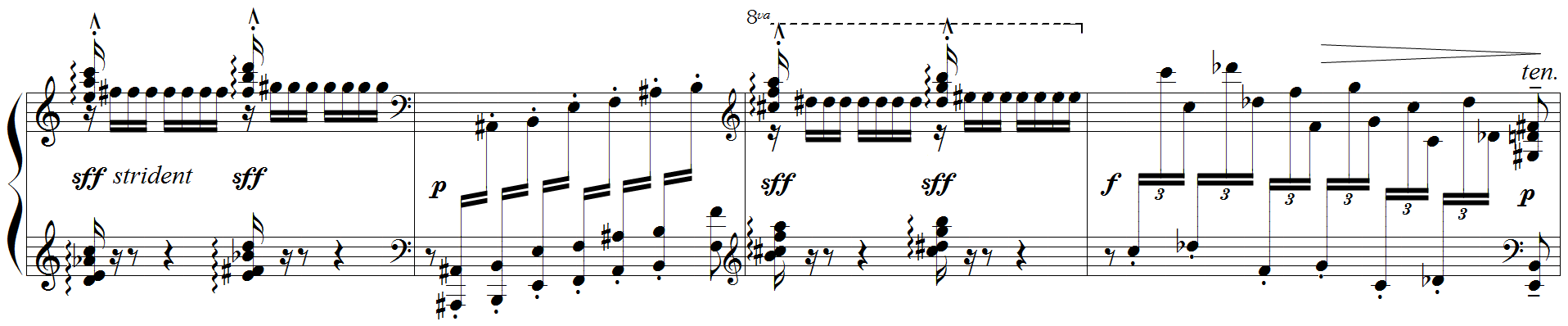

Among the contemporary works of the Études, Guy Sacre suggests a connection with the Sonata for Cello and Piano, whose music "sometimes grimaces, and it's not always for laughs: certain abruptness, certain stridencies are unmistakable, as are certain laments". Harry Halbreich notes that "dissonant intervals of seconds, minor or major, and augmented fourths, dominate, but Debussy also extensively uses the whole-tone scale: the nature of this interval material results in a completely atonal music, with the official tonality of G major remaining a mere possibility... on paper!"

==== 10. Pour les sonorités opposées (For opposing sonorities) ====
Pour les sonorités opposées, Walter Gieseking (1954)

This étude has garnered the most analyses and enthusiastic commentary: André Boucourechliev sees it as the "masterpiece of Debussy's modernity" and "one of the most admirable pages of the Études", according to Jean Barraqué – "of a troubling and audacious beauty", for Roland de Candé – "a doubly ingenious piece", for Harry Halbreich,

due to its sensational novelty of purpose and writing and the depth of its expressive message. For the first time, anticipating Webern and Messiaen, Debussy explores the unsuspected resources of timbres, attacks, and intensities within the sole framework of the piano.

André Boucourechliev defines this piece in terms of

a polyphony of delicately layered timbres in space, where the performer is heavily involved, as it is with their fingers and the imponderable weights they apply that they must materialize (or rather immaterialize) this writing. Moreover, they must, on their own initiative, fill in the gaps in dynamic notation, which requires serious prior reflection.

A characteristic example of the refinement in dynamic writing is found in mm. 38–41, where the same chord must be played three times in succession differently – piano soft, piano marked, piano expressive and penetrating – with hands crossing, to conclude:

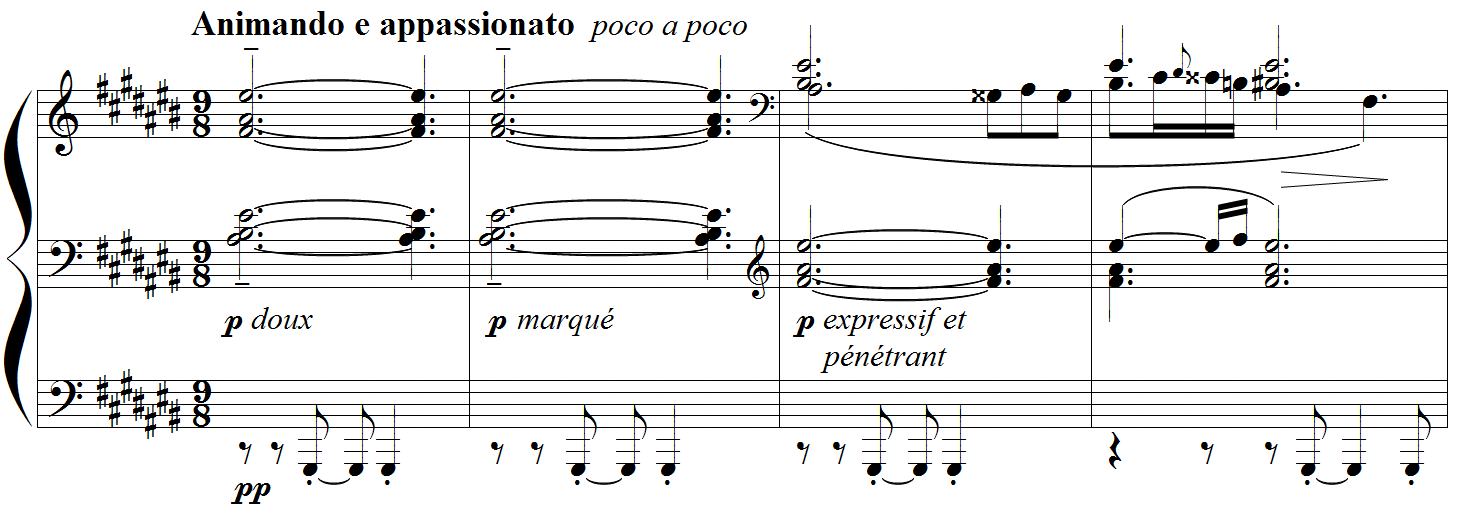

Jean Barraqué highlights "a contrapuntal arrangement of registers, dynamics, tempos, speeds of unfolding, and even expressive style notations". By contrast, "a fanfare motif in fourths and fifths adds an unexpected spatial dimension", a distant echo of En blanc et noir, where "G-sharp, sometimes spelled A-flat, serves as a pivot" between two distant tonalities. Measures 31–33 are shown below.

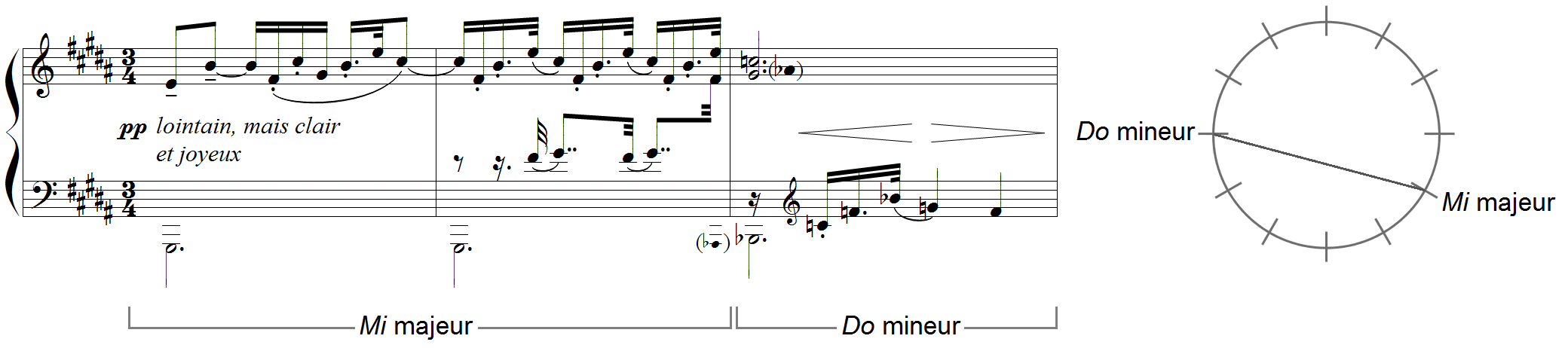

André Boucourechliev says "the greatest miracle is that these high speculations of writing give rise to music of such profound and poignant expression as this great sarabande, which responds more amply and intensely to the Hommage à Rameau" from 1905. The manuscript of this étude bears the indication "sonorities replaced – or expelled", reflecting the composer's unique approach.

==== 11. Pour les arpèges composés (For composite arpeggios) ====
Pour les arpèges composés, Walter Gieseking (1954)

In stark contrast to Pour les sonorités opposées, this piece offers "a delightful and fresh interlude, a luminous, ironic, and light play that recalls the smiling Debussy of the Estampes era", with its "stream of arpeggios and harmonies". Harry Halbreich specifies that "this relaxed page is the only one in the collection to end on a clear major perfect chord, affirming the main tonality of A-flat major".

Roland de Candé appreciates, in "this enchanting interlude, these clouds of colored notes" that "give the impression of fluid, magical clusters". André Boucourechliev comments further on "the writing of timbres based on harmony rather than rhythm", where tonalities shift constantly with the writing: "a change of key signature for a single measure at times!" The opening is shown below.

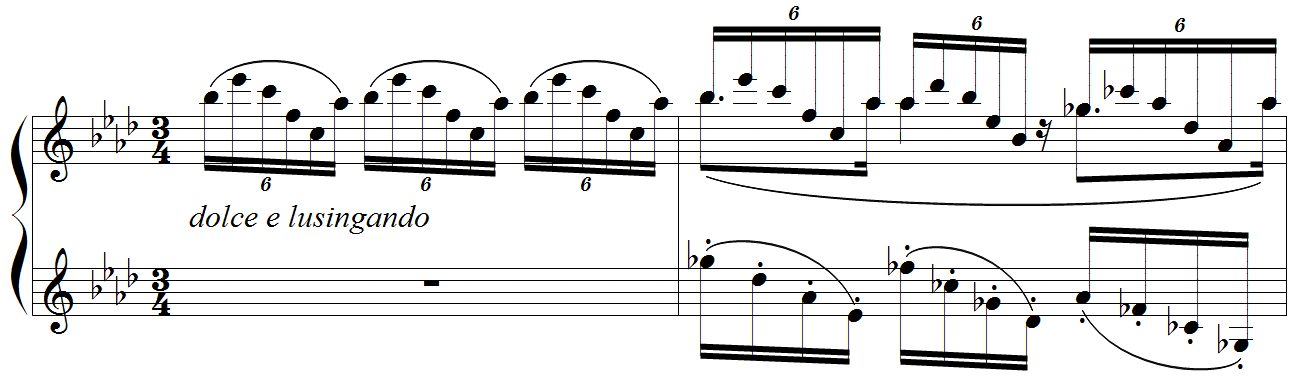

There exists a very different version of this étude, which Jean Gallois considers "a still poorly defined draft (and thus abandoned)", reconstructed and published by Roy Howat in 1980 under the title Étude retrouvée. It is "a six-page manuscript labeled Pour les arpèges composés, long considered a sketch of the final étude. Closer examination reveals a completely distinct piece. It appears Debussy worked on two possible versions for his composite arpeggios, choosing one and keeping the other in his papers, perhaps for later use in another form".

However, "It is most uncharacteristic of Debussy to have preserved anything which he had rejected, on which matter he was quite explicit to Pasteur Vallery-Radot: Je détruis tout ce qui ne me satisfait pas." Roy Howat observes that "the final version of Pour les arpèges composés provides a better foil to its neighboring études in the collection, both in its published position and in the order originally envisioned by the composerOriginal text: "Why did Debussy abandon it? Although one can only speculate, it is worth noting that the published version of pour les arpèges composés provides probably a better foil to its neighbouring etudes in the collection, both in its present position there and in that originally envisaged by the composer."

Close examination of the score reveals that "the paper used is thin and of poor quality, each sheet measuring 21x27cm, rather than the larger and thicker paper always used by Debussy for his final copies". Roy Howat recommends that pianists perform this piece as an intermezzo between the two Books, as the movement of Pour les degrés chromatiques matches that of Pour les huit doigts. According to him, "the two books of the ''Études'' were not composed to be played directly one after the other".

In its final version, Pour les arpèges composés echoes the first étude of Chopin's opus 25, which shares "the same tonality, A-flat major, and the same passion for arpeggiated formulas, a taste for the arabesque heightened in Debussy by his contact with Art Nouveau, inspired by the forms of the natural world. In both pieces, a song emerges from the liquid arpeggiated patterns, but while Chopin's Étude unfolds a broad and penetrating melodic line without continuity break, Debussy's central section introduces a capricious and ironic theme that contrasts with the undulating arpeggios framing it. Both pieces end with ethereal arabesques".

==== 12. Pour les accords (For chords) ====
Pour les accords, Walter Gieseking (1954)

According to Élie Robert Schmitz, this étude forms the best conclusion for the entire two books, due to "its rhythmic vitality, wide dynamic range, and the placement of voices in the presentation of elements, as in the finale of a concerto". Indeed, it stands out "for its immediate expression, whether the vigorous aggression and nightmarish insistence of the first and second parts, or the intensity of the visionary evocations in the mysterious and unsettling central section".

Debussy mentions, in a letter to his publisher, the "almost Swedish gymnastics" this étude demands "for the left hand" – or, more precisely, for both hands. As a pianist, André Boucourechliev speaks rather of a "Zen experience: one can only play without aiming, then count the points (the mistakes...)". The opening is shown below.

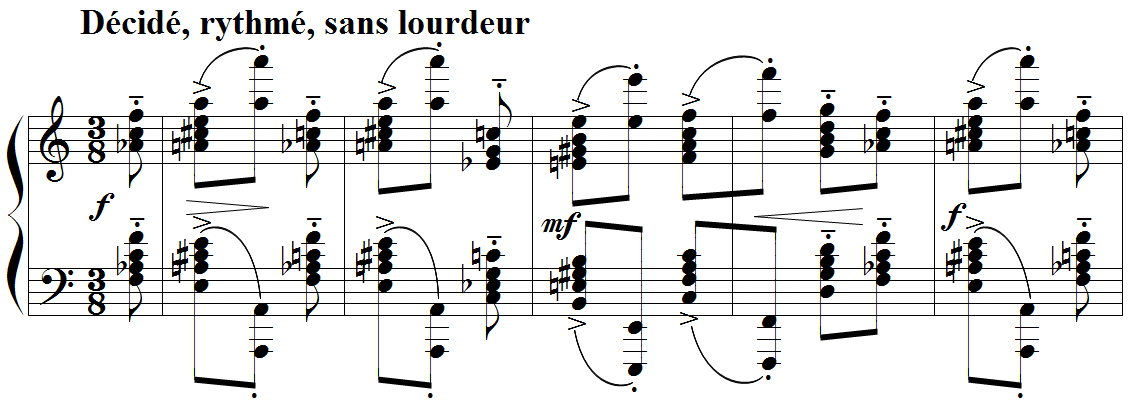

Harry Halbreich hears in this étude "an almost aggressive assertion of power, with a vigorous grip too often denied to the author of Pelléas et Mélisande. Debussy opens percussive perspectives for the piano that his successors would exploit". Harmonically, there is "no languid chromaticism, but a vigorous and austere modalism with a pentatonic infrastructure, juxtaposing unrelated perfect chords, whose vehement dynamics heighten the dissonant context". Guy Sacre also discovers an "unusual Debussy in the twelfth étude, which seems written in praise of the 'machine rhythm' that music, with Stravinsky or Prokofiev, was beginning to exemplify. How far from the blur of impressionism!"

The structure of the étude is symmetrical, with the "extraordinary middle of the piece, entirely different, slow to the point of negating movement (an eighth note in 6/8 equals a measure in the previous 3/8!), and which Vladimir Jankélévitch compares to the "enigmatic and menacing pause" of the "eye of the cyclone" in Masques" – "a sublime poetic moment": Measures 84–85 are shown below.

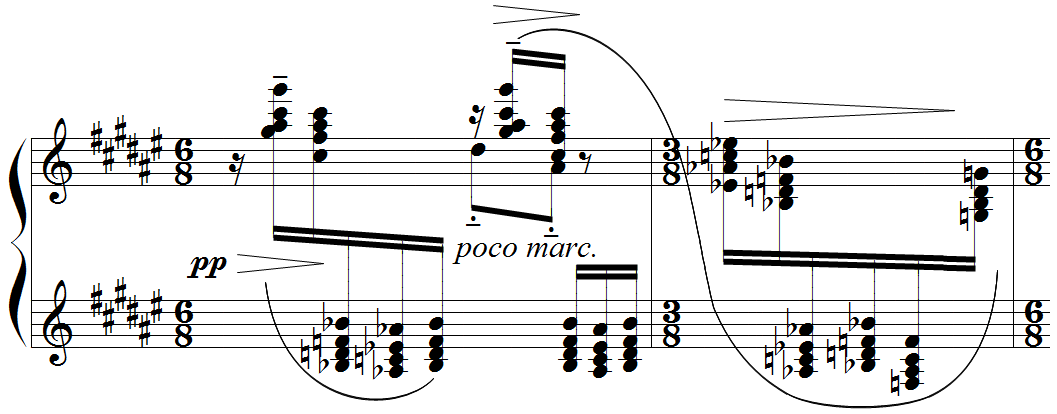

Harmonically, Jankélévitch observes that "the eighth Pour les agréments, the ninth Pour les notes répétées, the tenth Pour les sonorités opposées, and especially the final Pour les accords experiment in every form with this sporadism of perfect chords, the tonal insularity it implies, and the mysterious melodic circulation that runs through it".

In every respect, this final étude constitutes the climax of the work. According to Anthony Girard, "the composer feigns to drift away", offering two peaks of tension (measures 31 to 40, then 140 to 159) before the true climax (measures 168 to 180), "abrupt, gripping: it stands in opposition to what one expects from a brilliant apogee, giving the collection's conclusion a true emotional weight". As such, Pour les accords "is not the most beautiful of the twelve études" in Guy Sacre's view, "but it is undoubtedly the one that best reveals in Debussy other possible worlds, left unexplored".

== Premiere ==
Uncertainty surrounds the premiere of the Études: when and in what context were they first performed publicly? Works dedicated to Debussy state that the Douze Études were premiered on 14 December 1916 in Paris, by the pianist Walter Rummel. André Boucourechliev is highly critical of this performer, stating: "to know that the work was premiered by Walter Rummel in 1916 is to evoke a massacre...". Edward Lockspeiser disagrees, attributing to this pianist, from a lineage of German musicians, "a sense of French piano music comparable to that of Gieseking". Debussy himself held Rummel in high esteem, considering him a "prince of virtuosos". However, due to the war, the Guide du Concert was not printed, and the details of this concert's program remain unknown.

The uncertainty is compounded by confusion, as in his comprehensive chronological work Music since 1900, the meticulous musicologist Nicolas Slonimsky omits mention of Walter Rummel's concert and suggests 10 November 1915 as the premiere date for the Études, performed by Marguerite Long at the Société nationale de musique.

However, in her memoirs, Marguerite Long states that she only worked on the Études with Debussy in 1917 and mentions regarding this concert:

As the S.M.I. had done in the spring, the S.N.M. reopened its doors. On November 10, alongside another great French work, I performed in premiere a group of Debussy's Études (in this order: No. 11 Pour les arpèges composés, No. 10 Pour les sonorités opposées, No. 1 Pour les cinq doigts).

There should be no doubt about the year – though not explicitly stated – of this concert, as the pianist refers to this event after mentioning "the tragic October 1917" when the composer's condition worsened abruptly.

Marguerite Long nonetheless writes that she performed these three études "in premiere" on November 10, 1917, and Nicolas Slonimsky reports this concert as a complete presentation of the Études. However, études Nos. 10 and 11 had already been publicly performed by the American pianist George Copeland on November 21, 1916, at Aeolian Hall in New York.

The composer's correspondence resolves in favor of the concert on December 14, 1916, providing a detail overlooked by his biographers: on November 26, 1916, Debussy congratulated Walter Rummel for his initiative in presenting Four Études in a concert benefiting the Aide affectueuse aux musiciens, an association the pianist had founded in October 1915 with his wife, daughter of the Barbizon school painter Ferdinand Chaigneau. This would thus be another partial premiere of the Études, in the fashionable setting of the Parisian salon of Countess Orlowski.

Thus, as with the two books of the Préludes, the circumstances of a complete premiere of the Études remain unknown.

== Performance ==
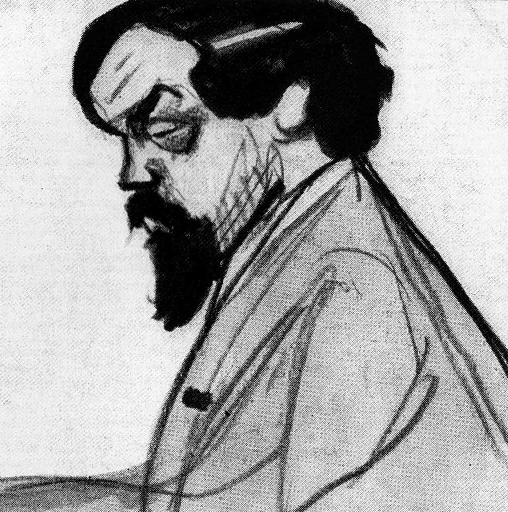
Debussy at the piano – caricature by Jean Dulac in 1912

In a letter dated 1 September 1915 to his publisher, Debussy declares:

I could play you these Études that frighten your fingers. Be assured that mine sometimes pause before certain passages. I need to catch my breath as if after a climb... In truth, this music soars at the peaks of performance – there will be fine records to set.

However, his health deteriorated rapidly. On April 29, 1917, in a letter to Gabriel Fauré, the composer admitted that he gave up performing this score because he no longer knew "how to play the piano well enough to risk performing my Études. In public, I'm struck by a peculiar phobia: there are too many keys; I don't have enough fingers; and suddenly, I no longer know where the pedals are! It's sad and utterly distressing."

According to Harry Halbreich, "despite its robustness", particularly aggressive in the étude Pour les accords, "this music demands from the performer a particular elegance and an elasticity that is very difficult to achieve". Marie Duchêne-Thégarid and Diane Fanjul have explored this aspect of the composer's legacy:

At his death, Debussy left his pianistic oeuvre in the hands of renowned performers who, on stage, could convey to audiences an interpretation authorized – at least in part – by the composer. But neither Walter Rummel, nor George Copeland, nor Ricardo Viñes, nor Élie Robert Schmitz, nor Maurice Dumesnil were led to teach their expertise at the Conservatoire.

Thus, "Marguerite Long, whose relationship with Debussy is now viewed with circumspection, was for a long time one of the few performers and pedagogues" bridging the concert hall and the classroom. She recounts in her memoirs the audience's astonishment:

At the concert, as soon as I began the do-re-mi-fa-sol-fa-mi-re-do of the piece Pour les cinq doigts, a lady in the audience, resistant to its spirit and perhaps recalling the tedious 'scales' of her youth, exclaimed in shock:

– Really! If it weren't signed Debussy!

Yet vigorous applause, including hers, greeted the end of the piece, and all that we have said about its musical beauty.

The humor present in the Études – "this spirit of ironic plagiarism", in Vladimir Jankélévitch's words – indeed reflects "the good humor of mutual parody among French musicians: Debussy parodying Carl Czerny, Séverac parodying Daquin, Charles Bordes, Albéniz, and Emmanuel Chabrier, Chabrier parodying the bombast of tetraological rodomontades, Satie parodying everyone, Saint-Saëns himself, in The Carnival of the Animals, imitating Offenbach, Berlioz... and Saint-Saëns, and finally Ravel, who so often speaks the language of Domenico Scarlatti – they all place the romantic concern for their originality secondary to the concern for their feints".

Christian Goubault directly links the challenges of performance to the innovations introduced by the composer:

These Études organize space and time with changes in registers and tempos, establish an inventory of differentiations in pianistic touch, note and chord attacks (from caresses and the imperceptible to percussion and stridency), dynamics, reliefs, and volumes (thickness and depth), colors, spectra, and sonic layers, and resonance effects (from blended/chained to frictions and note clashes). One must keep these elements in mind and possess exceptional sensitivity when approaching these compositions, where sound is truly scrutinized in all its aspects.

At the end of the 20th century, the pianist Philippe Cassard considers the Études as "the absolute piano". According to him, "Debussy rediscovers a second freshness to accomplish this comprehensive survey of the piano's possibilities. After the second book of the Préludes, where a subtle dissolution undermines the meter, erodes the tempo, and stretches the breath, the composer rebuilds with his two books of Études a framed, angular universe.". Thus, the "sonic material" of this final collection, "naturally rich and inspiring, constantly stimulates the imagination, sparks discoveries, excites the senses, and gives unparalleled relief and a palette of colors to the works of a large part of our repertoire".

Aldo Ciccolini places the Études in the great pianistic tradition established by Mozart and Chopin, specifying that "what is added above or below the note (its intensity, weight, articulation) is as important as the note itself. Scrutinizing it on paper, constantly probing it at the keyboard, this music is highly demanding. It trains the ear to act as a sonic microscope, revealing the infinitely small nuances of color and harmonic subtleties": "Playing Chopin does not necessarily help one better perform Debussy. However, working on Debussy allows one to discern more finesse in Chopin's music."

== Legacy ==
In concluding his correspondence with Jacques Durand about the Études, Debussy confides briefly:

I put a lot of love and a lot of faith in the future of the Études. I hope they will please you, both for the music and for their purpose.

According to Émile Vuillermoz,

Debussy, always inclined to modestly conceal his intimate feelings behind a mask of irony, said of these dazzling achievements: "They represent the thousand ways to treat pianists as they deserve!" But, in reality, he was secretly satisfied with them.

The pianist Jan Michiels regrets that "the Études remain even today in the shadow of the Préludes and Images, which are far more frequently performed: even Alfred Cortot, in his comprehensive work on French Piano Music, devotes only a few paragraphs to the cycle. Yet these twelve pieces constitute a pivotal moment in the history of music" and the culmination of his piano oeuvre, according to Antoine Goléa, who considers them "masterpieces of new music due to their complete formal freedom, rhythmic fantasy, and prodigious harmonic invention at every moment".

In his article for the special issue of La Revue musicale dedicated to Debussy in 1920, Alfred Cortot devotes barely a page to the Études, compared to five pages of commentary on the Préludes. Recognizing in the composer's final piano collection, "with combinations already familiar from earlier works and where Debussy's personality is so characteristically inscribed, an unsuspected range of pianistic sensations all the more striking and original because the succession of a literary idea no longer explains or mitigates their audacious novelty", the pianist suggests that the musical and technical quality of the work, "where the principles of modern virtuosity are affirmed under the aegis of a great name, may suffice to earn Debussy, in the gratitude of tomorrow's piano teachers, a place whose exceptional didactic importance his finest and most ironic humor would surely not have anticipated".

=== Criticism ===
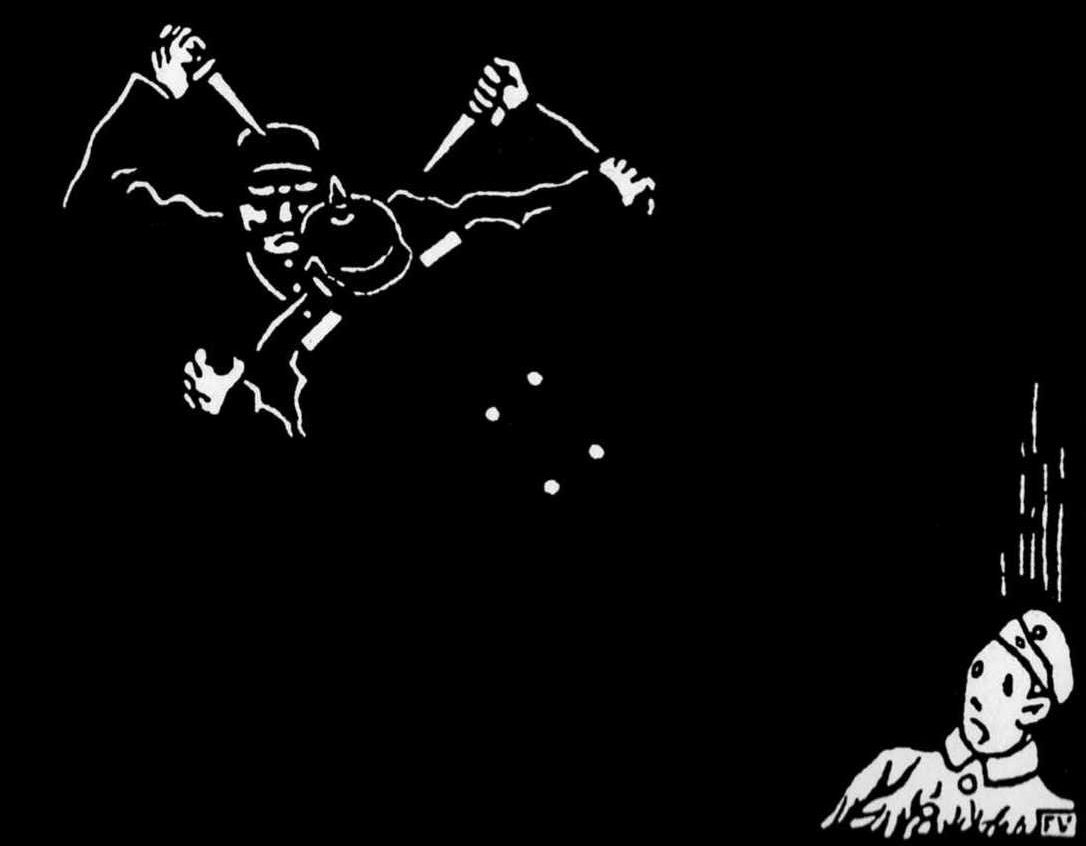
"In the Darkness", woodcut by Félix Vallotton (This Is War IV, 1916)

According to Harry Halbreich, "like all of Debussy's late works, the Études were long considered products of a declining imagination, where pure cerebral abstraction failed to compensate for the impoverishment due to age and illness". The correspondence of Maurice Emmanuel sheds light on the disaffection toward the 1915 piano pieces with a diametrically opposed argument, where it is not the drying up of imagination but its overflow that is at issue. Committed to defending the work and memory of the composer of Pelléas et Mélisande against Saint-Saëns, who argued that "the pursuit of originality leads only to the baroque"; the old classical master adding that "one gets used to everything, to filth, even to crime, but there are precisely things one must not get used to" and concluding that "Debussy did not create a style: he cultivated the absence of style, logic, and common sense. But he had a harmonious name. If he had been called Martin, no one would have ever spoken of him, letter from Camille Saint-Saëns to Maurice Emmanuel, August 4, 1920."

Maurice Emmanuel acknowledges in his response:

I do not claim that his language or style are beyond all criticism. I immensely enjoy many of his subtle works, but there are some, especially among the last ones, where the composer, perhaps fearing to be outdone, pushes himself to extremes and overshoots his original aim: those, I do not like; I do not understand them. And I concede to you, among others, the duos Blanc et Noir.

— Maurice Emmanuel to Camille Saint-Saëns, December 10, 1920.

Annette Becker analyzes the mutual animosity between Saint-Saëns and Debussy during the war:

Saint-Saëns calls him a cubist "capable of atrocities" upon the publication of En blanc et noir. If this music is unbearable to Saint-Saëns, it can only be of German Kultur, responsible for cultural atrocities, kubist in a word, based on the belief that the pictorial invention of the Spaniard Picasso and the Frenchman Braque bore the abject nationality of their dealer Kahnweiler. In reality, Saint-Saëns had long been tracking modernist tendencies in Debussy, and the war reignited this front despite a façade of sacred union for pure French music.

André Suarès justifies this misunderstanding by contemporaries: "they saw in it a game of rare form. The extreme boldness of the harmony misled them about the sentiments: here, the cruel perfume of the flower misleads the musician who breathes it. He no longer discerns the nature of the plant, and its beauty escapes him." However, a new critical orientation emerged in 1915.

In music, it was the era of melodic thread entanglements,

then of undulations and knots of the melodic thread,

then Debussy came, decomposing, enervating, gently shredding the thread,

then Ravel playing with the sonic lint.

— Jean Cocteau, We Would Like to Say a Word. Response to Young Musicians, 1915.

Following the reproaches of the "old masters", this attack expresses the ambitions of a new generation that prefers Stravinsky to Ravel and Satie to Stravinsky. This led to a mystification effort – "masterfully orchestrated by Jean Cocteau", according to Anne Rey – that seeks to "attribute to Satie not only laurels but a priority of inspiration". This "maneuver" is vividly expressed during a Satie Festival organized by Cocteau on June 7, 1920, where the poet claims to quote "a phrase from Satie told to me by Debussy that determined the aesthetic of Pelléas".

Cocteau's claims are now harshly condemned. Ornella Volta, a Satie specialist, recalls:

Cocteau was never close to Debussy, whom he likely met only occasionally at the Ballets Russes, and no more. It is thus highly unlikely, as he claims, that the composer of Pelléas confided in him about any debt to Satie.

In 1923, Satie wrote to the young painter Jean Guérin: "Cocteau continues to annoy me with his intrigues... He claims pretended discoveries (and picks pockets). Let's speak of him no more: he is too much of a liar...", and "this influence that Jean Cocteau sought to exert on French music proved to be without consequence". Faced with this "astonishing evolution of opinion, since 1902, regarding the importance to be given to Debussy's work", Anne Rey observes that "after Pelléas, it no longer followed the course of history: the fin de siècle appearance of Le Martyre de saint Sébastien amidst the peak of cubism (1911), the icy distinction of Jeux at a time when gaiety was in vogue" – and this final piano collection bearing witness to a "choice of total, enigmatic abstraction". Thus, Antoine Goléa acknowledges that, musically, "the solution in the Études reaches and surpasses its critical point. More than ever, admirers of the early Debussy, up to but excluding La Mer, will speak, regarding these two books, of formless music, incoherent music, music of a sick man".

=== Recognition ===
Of the three hypotheses proposed by Antoine Goléa – formless music, incoherent music, music of a sick man – hypotheses:

that, with their air of certainty, take on the appearance of accusations, only the third is accurate – but accurate not in the primary sense that would deny the sick Debussy any power of invention and composition, but in the subtler and only true sense, where complete freedom, the total and constant unpredictability of form, are, in all of Debussy's late works, the sign of the inner liberation of the man and the creator from the contingencies of a life from which he feels himself irrevocably slipping away.

Vladimir Jankélévitch also considers that "Debussy is so great, so ingenious that he was able to anticipate anti-Debussyism: the marvelous and harsh steel mechanisms of the Épigraphes antiques and the Douze Études react, before Les Six did, against impressionism". Anthony Girard is similarly struck: "With the Douze Études, one measures the distance Debussy took from Debussy himself". The final piano collection, "by renouncing the Images, the Estampes, all that intensely poetic figuration that served as the framework for many works, from Jeux de vagues to Parfums de la nuit", embodies "this victory over Debussyism, over the weight of an originality too strong, generating epigones".

"Debussy enters his era of effacement", in the words of Jean Barraqué, at least in France – for "the odious musical milieu of the interwar period", which André Boucourechliev criticizes as the "pseudo-avant-garde of the Six, with their remarkably impoverished language, led by that trickster called Cocteau"; "as the situation was quite different in Europe". In Germany, the musicologist Hans Heinz Stuckenschmidt, a specialist in Schönberg, presents Debussy as "the first radical composer of the new musical era". In Hungary, Béla Bartók, who performed the entirety of Debussy's Préludes in a single concert, declared that "Debussy is the greatest musician of the 20th century". In France, however, Paul Landormy only briefly mentions the Études without listing their titles or commenting on them in his history of French Music (from Franck to Debussy) in 1943.

After World War II, in his analysis of the introduction to Stravinsky's Le Sacre du printemps for his composition course at the Conservatoire, Olivier Messiaen specifies that "Debussy, who was its champion, extends rhythmic irrationality to a new conception of form in scores such as the piano Études or Jeux". In 1948, Guy Ferchault offers a positive judgment on the work:

Despite the apparent dryness of these scholastic titles, the Douze Études are far from lacking genuine musical interest. Beyond their pedagogical significance, it is their pure musical substance that attracts and holds attention. In this regard, they undoubtedly represent the most striking inspiration, the most accomplished example, and the most perfect synthesis of the notion of style applied to Claude Debussy's piano oeuvre.

Roger Smalley reconsiders the composition of the Études in terms of new forms in a 1968 article in The Musical Times titled Debussy & Messiaen: "Debussy's Études are never a merely arbitrary juxtaposition of unrelated ideas. They are poetic music of a continuing thought process which produces a series of images related, not by a background of musical logic which can be precisely demonstrated, but simply by the fact that they were generated by that thought process".

According to Antoine Goléa, "their extraordinary freedom is purely musical: it belongs entirely to Debussy, the visionary, whom illness helped liberate from all earthly, temporal, or merely practical constraints". At the end of the 20th century, Guy Sacre summarizes the evolution of judgments on the Études: "Lovers of the 'first', or even 'second', Debussy continue, it seems, to shun these pages. The deliberate choice of abstraction, of 'pure music' (that dreadful term!) that accompanies them leads them to imagine a gaunt, cerebral work, a laboratory product". But "those who simply apply their ears to them love them more each day".

=== Influence ===
In a radio interview on 13 December 1953, titled Mind over Music, Edgard Varèse notes, starting with Jeux, "a certain surface hardness, a more austere atmosphere, a higher tension than in any of his previous works". He believes that "Debussy sensed the changing pulse of his era, and I am sure that, had he not been incurably ill, we would have witnessed a new orientation in his music". Heinrich Strobel confirms this new direction regarding the Études: "Whether approached from the perspective of technique or composition, one is astonished by the novelty of spirit that reigns in them".

Vladimir Jankélévitch specifies that "Debussy is not alone", mentioning the études composed around the same time by Roger-Ducasse, whose titles recall those of Debussy: Étude en sol dièse mineur with repeated notes (1914), Quatre études (1915), Étude en la bémol majeur and Étude en sixtes (1916), Rythmes (1917), Sonorités (1918). This composer, "the cherished student of Fauré", was a close friend of Debussy and an excellent pianist, to the point of premiering the suite En blanc et noir in a duet with him on December 21, 1916. The Études he composed were premiered by Marguerite Long on May 7, 1917, and enthusiastically praised by Debussy: "I heard your Études, so difficult, for which Marguerite Long's fingers multiplied!" Guy Sacre notes, however, that "unlike Debussy's contemporary étude in G-flat major, for sixths, it chooses the brilliance of color and the radiance of sonority".

According to Edward Lockspeiser, "the prelude of Ravel's Le Tombeau de Couperin evokes the first of the Douze Études". Jan Michiels notes that Paul Dukas alludes to the étude Pour les sixtes and to the Prélude à l'après-midi d'un faune in La plainte, au loin, du faune... from the Tombeau de Claude Debussy commissioned by La Revue musicale in 1920. Among French composers of the second half of the 20th century, Olivier Messiaen focuses "as much on instrumental writing as on compositional theory" in his Quatre études de rythme (1950) and André Boucourechliev pays homage to the étude Pour les quartes in his Six Études d'après Piranèse (1975). For this generation of musicians, Debussy's Études represent "a laboratory of composition, a place of exploration".

Roland de Candé highlights in "this visionary masterpiece" of the Études "an extraordinary subtlety of rhythms and timbres, with gradations of intensities and attacks, far ahead of its time. Debussy invents everything: this music is foreign to any pre-existing principle. Tonal harmony is surpassed: only its shadow, its symbol, remains. The pianistic technique creates a new world, anticipating the research after 1950 and even serving as its inaugural step".

Vladimir Jankélévitch evokes the influence of the "painful Debussy of the final years" on the Douze Études, Op. 33, by Karol Szymanowski, "when the writing begins to take on a jagged edge, becomes corrosive and harsh, making the melodious violins scrape everywhere". Finally, Paul Roberts considers that, in these pieces, "Debussy directly announces the pianistic language of Bartók, even without Bartók's violently dissonant harmonies" – a connection confirmed by Harry Halbreich for Bartók's Trois Études, op. 18, which are "a Debussy who knew Schönberg, spiced with distant folkloric memories".

In piano music, however, a more precise influence of the Études is evident in the Douze études d'interprétation, by Maurice Ohana, also composed in two books, from 1982 to 1985. According to Paul Roberts, in these two works, "the instrument does not undergo the music but is its source: it constantly explores and discovers in terms of resonance, texture, and timbre". Alain Poirier considers "the connection with the first book of Debussy's Études even more evident in the études dedicated to an interval – the seconds (No. 8), fifths (No. 5), sevenths (No. 7), and ninths (No. 10) – precisely the only intervals Debussy had not addressed".

In a more classical perspective, in 1939, the pianist and composer Robert Casadesus dedicated his Huit Études, op. 28 to intervals and explorations of timbres – the thirds (No. 1), fourths and fifths (No. 4), octaves (No. 2), chords (No. 7), and sonorities (No. 3) – already illustrated in Debussy's Études.

From 2000 to 2011, Karol Beffa composed twelve Études for piano, published in two books – "the six études of the first book play with intervals: thirds and fifths for the first, octaves for the second, sevenths for the third, etc. Cascades of notes, chord oscillations, and three-against-two recall Debussy's Pour les arpèges composés".

Frank Dowe connects the asymmetry of the rhythms of certain Études, particularly Pour les notes répétées, to the music of Stravinsky, whose polyrhythmic audacities trace back to the Quatre Études, op. 7 (1908). Through their rhythmic finesse, intensity, and attack, the Études pave the way for composers such as Messiaen, Boulez, Jean Barraqué, and Stockhausen, up to Toshio Hosokawa in his Études I-VI of 2013. The pianist Philippe Cassard extends the influence of this work to the styles of Webern, Britten, Dutilleux, Bill Evans, Thelonious Monk, and Erroll Garner.

== Analysis ==
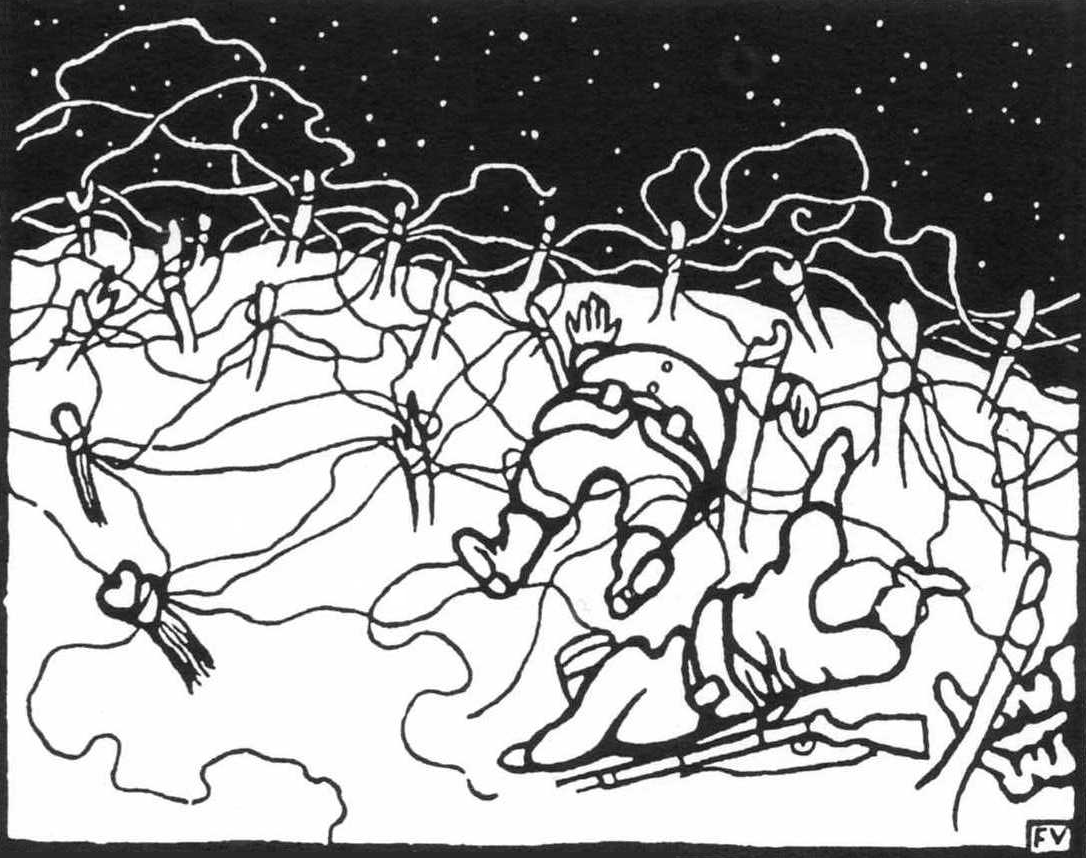
"Barbed Wire", woodcut by Félix Vallotton (This Is War III, 1916)

Pierre Boulez seeks to analyze the Études in great detail, without separating them from Debussy's piano oeuvre and highlighting their connections with his other works:

There was much to say; the Études were neglected and underestimated, and I wanted to give them their full value: they are, in my eyes, very important, not only for piano writing but for musical conception. And it is one of the works Debussy cared about most.

— Pierre Boulez, Regards sur Debussy, 2013.

Antoine Goléa believes that,

for Debussy, technical questions were mere pretexts. What interested him were three orders of purely musical structural problems:

the problem of certain harmonic structures, completely foreign to tonal structures, of which the étude Pour les quartes offers the most accomplished example;

the problem of timbres, particularly evident in the étude Pour les sonorités opposées;

finally, the problem of the freedom of form, the greatest of Debussy's musical concerns.

=== Harmonic structures ===
André Boucourechliev considers that the first étude, Pour les cinq doigts, "immediately reveals the technique of ruptures. All the material derives from the five notes of the diatonic scale. It becomes clear that do-ré-mi-fa-sol is not 'the theme' – there is no theme – but the program of the work, which gives it its coherence. As for tonality, it is severely tested, and this, far from any chromaticism. Barely is a tonality stated before we find ourselves in another, in none, or in a recall. Harmonically, it's a game of cat and mouse." Measures 11–14 are shown below.

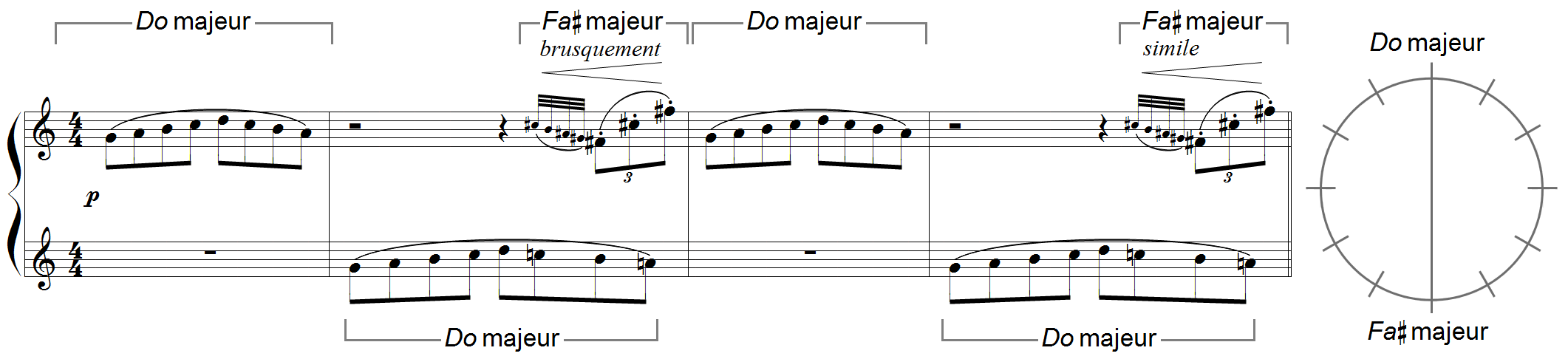

Edward Lockspeiser emphasizes the importance of "the diminished seventh chord, which has the particular property of being a pivotal, modulating chord, capable of branching into one of eight tonalities (four major and four minor). However, if this chord is not used to modulate to another key but is linked to other seventh chords in succession, it creates a sense of continuous suspense". Measures 70–71 of Pour les notes répétées are shown below.

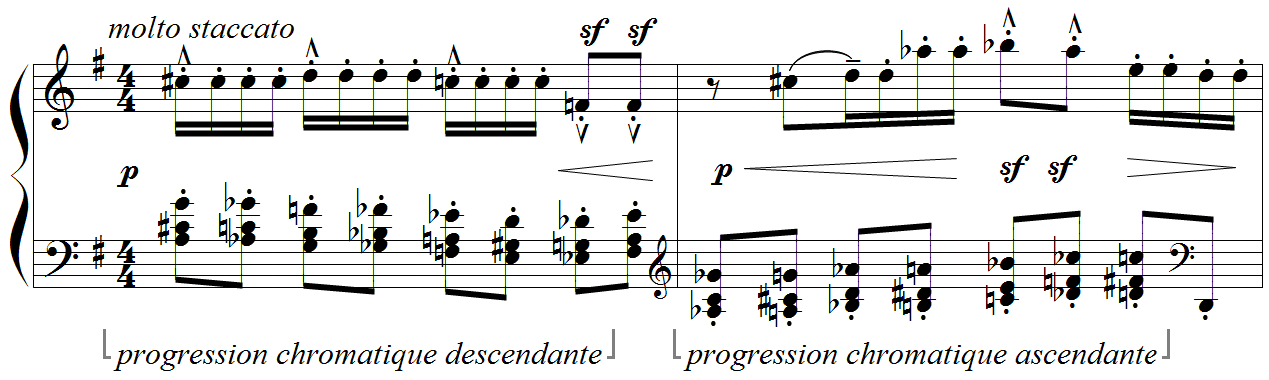

Across the Études, Vladimir Jankélévitch marvels at "this magical power to evoke immensity through an infinitesimal fracture of harmony":

Here, bitonality grates and dissonates fiercely; here, the false note wounds and tears; here, the violence is a bite and a scratch!

Analyzing the relationships between chords in greater detail, the musicologist observes an "alternation, in the étude Pour les sonorités opposées, between the two keys of A-flat major and E major. Yet, this étude reveals clearings in C major that unexpectedly pierce the general tonality." Measures 19–20 are shown below.

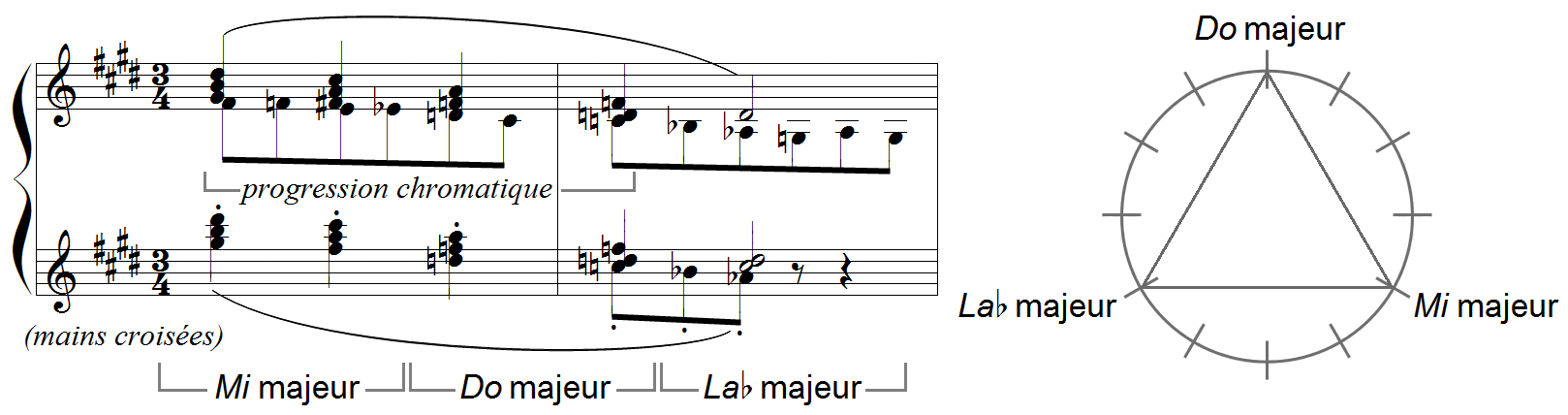

From a dual musicological and philosophical perspective, this polytonality "poetically expresses the coexistence and copresence of all creatures and creates a harmonic atmosphere where chords, captured in their evanescent state, vibrate and shimmer with divine ambiguity".

=== Sonorities ===
According to Jan Michiels, the titles of the Études "confirm that Debussy does not use catalysts external to pure music, as in La Mer, the Images, or even the Préludes, where descriptive titles only appear after the final double bar. Pure sound, a single interval, a particular texture, a specific pianistic gesture are the only references on which the composer builds his Études".

In the étude Pour les quartes, Frank Dowe associates the piano's sonorities with "effects of gamelan". Guy Sacre sees in this piece "the most harmonious of sonic objects, carrying a thousand reminiscences that blend seamlessly: Javanese gamelan, Andalusian scale, medieval modes..". For Christian Goubault, "the music fades into silence and the sky, not without having plumbed the depths of muted chords of stacked fourths on which fragments of the arabesque are articulated". In the étude Pour les agréments, "there are no trills, no grupetto. The interest lies elsewhere, in vibrant sonorities, in timbres". From the first étude, Pour les cinq doigts, "Debussy offers a kaleidoscope of colors through flats (C-flat major, E-flat major, A-flat major) within the general key of C major". And, by "a taste for paradox, the tonality of C major is boldly affirmed (mes.53)" in the étude Pour les degrés chromatiques.

According to Didier Guigue, "more than a chord in C-sharp minor", the final chord of the étude Pour les sonorités opposées constitutes "a sonic object endowed with essential functional qualities inherent to its final position, within the framework of a closed form": "more than ever before in his work or in the history of music, Debussy experiments here with the formal power of sound against that of the note". Measures 74–75 are shown below.

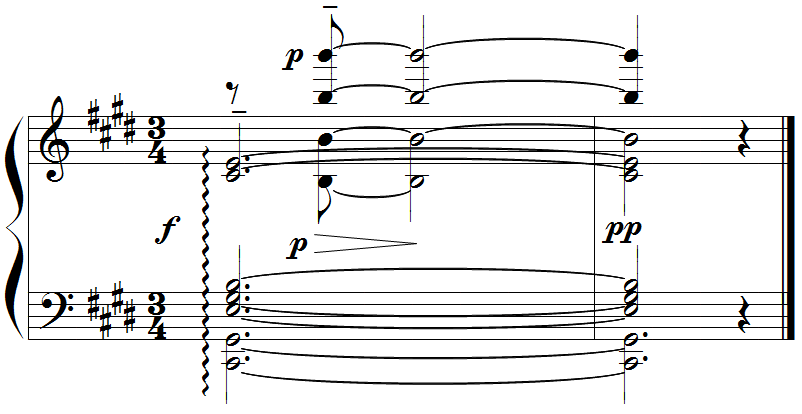

Edward Lockspeiser considers the "distant" effects in Debussy's work: "this idea of a scene played at a distance is found at the end of Une soirée dans Grenade, and again in the central part of the last piano étude, Pour les accords. Distance, space, and light are suggested in the broad textures of Brouillards and La Terrasse des audiences du clair de lune (Nos. 1 and 7 of the second book of Préludes) and the étude Pour les sonorités opposées." Measures 68–70 are shown below.

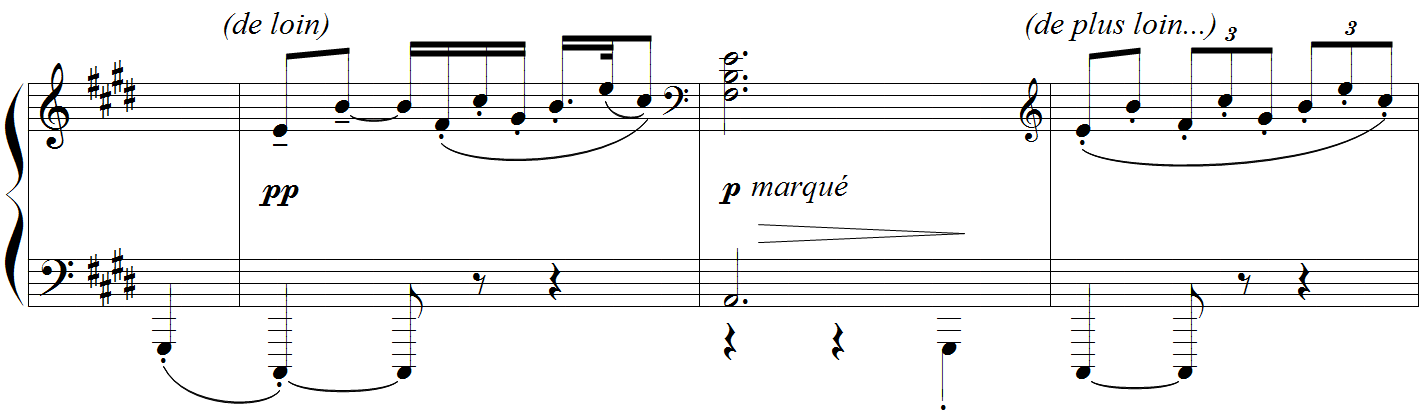

Vladimir Jankélévitch devoted significant work to Debussy's musical aesthetic, where "everywhere the distant beckons to the distant" – from the "languid distances of the étude ''Pour les quartes'"" to the "mysterious distances of the étude ''Pour les degrés chromatiques''" or, in the étude Pour les accords, the "furtive and anxious staccatos in the low register" evoking "the shadow of Golaud lurking in the distance like a threat". The philosopher and musicologist suggests that "sometimes, the effect of distance results from the harmony itself and the relationship of tonalities. Naturals, generating contrasting illuminations, naturalize the flattened traits of the étude Pour les huit doigts and alternate the glissando on the black keys with the glissando on the white keys": Measures 33–35 of Pour les huit doigts are shown below.

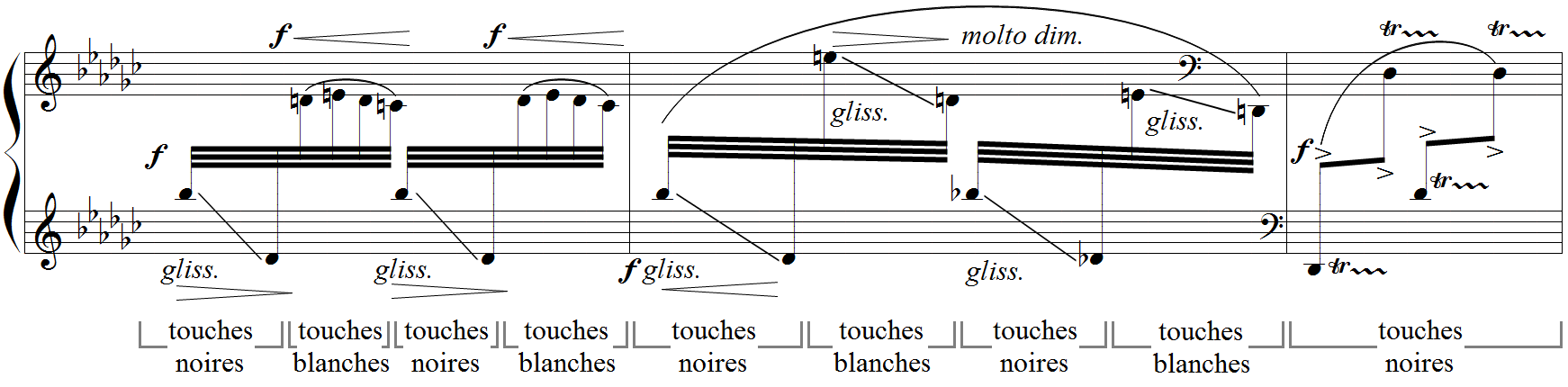

Through a technical artifice, the piano's sonority is no longer discontinuous but pulverized: "there is then only a deluge of small notes on the black and white keys". Debussy works with a musical material that is "instantaneous – where invention constantly renews itself – with such mobility and discontinuity that the form adapts to the music with extreme flexibility".

=== Free forms ===
Christian Goubault has taken a particular interest in the form of Debussy's Études. Considering only their structure, the twelve pieces initially evoke the spirit of the toccata, with a freedom in development close to improvisation. The most common formal model can be noted as A–B–A′, clearly identifiable in the études Pour les tierces, Pour les sixtes, Pour les octaves, Pour les notes répétées, Pour les arpèges composés, and Pour les accords, even if this pattern is "treated differently each time" and sometimes "in a more veiled or ambiguous form".

Anthony Girard interprets this general A–B–A′ structure as a "varied strophic form, but the idea of a form proceeding by successive waves seems more pertinent", especially if one aims to "highlight the dynamic plan in relation to the tonal and thematic plan". It is then possible to consider a true "dynamic form" where the forte and fortissimo represent the culmination of tension beyond mere color effects. The following table provides, as examples, the structure of the ninth and eleventh études:

Étude	A	B	A′
pour les notes répétées	mm. 1–27	mm. 28–65	mm. 66–84
pour les arpèges composés	mm. 1–25	mm. 26–49	mm. 50–67

According to Roy Howat, "from a formal perspective", the "rediscovered" version of the étude Pour les arpèges composés "From a formal point of view, this etude has virtually nothing in common with the published version; the latter is in clear ternary form with a coda recalling the central episode (the most characteristic form found in Debussy's piano works), while the earlier version is more difficult to define in conventional terms".

Pierre Boulez identifies a "circular form, or more precisely that of a scherzo with two trios", in the étude Pour les notes répétées: while recalling "the thematic introduction of certain sonatas by Beethoven, the first eight measures evoke the progressive focusing of a primary figure. The elements appear in the order that will be fixed in the figure but are incomplete, unstable, interspersed with pauses, and lacking clear direction". The following table delineates "the segments where the true processes occur":

Scherzo I	Trio I	Scherzo II	Trio II	Scherzo III
mm. 1–27	mm. 28–38	mm. 39–54	mm. 55–65	mm. 66–84
Introduction (mm. 1–8)		Varied and amplified introduction (mm. 39–48)	Amplification of Trio I	Introduction (mm. 66–69)
Figure 1 Transition (mm. 9–13)		Figure 1, varied (mm. 49–54)		Figure 1, varied (mm. 70–80)
Derived figure Transition; Varied repetition (mm. 17–21)				Coda (mm. 81–84)

Musicologists agree on defining this form as A–B–A′ rather than the traditional A–B–A. Sylveline Bourion analyzes in greater detail the technique developed by Debussy in his Études "to gradually but surely slide the material toward the breaking point" through a process of duplication, far removed from classical or Franckist principles. In the étude Pour les sixtes, for example, duplication occurs from one measure to the next "by rhythmic modification of the second beat, which leads to a slowing down, a softening of the articulation." Measures 10–11 are shown below.

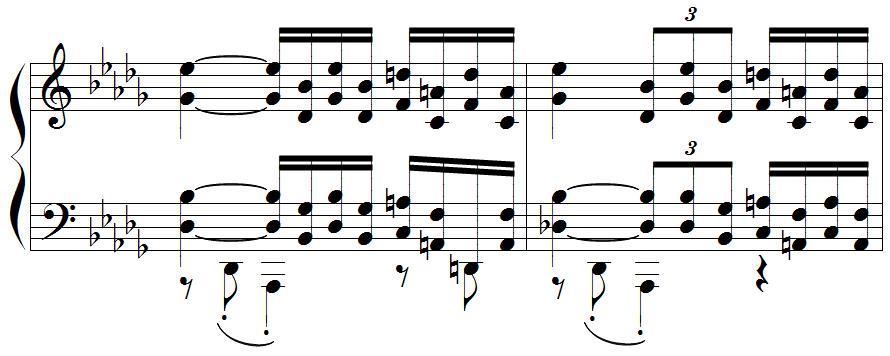

In the re-exposition (A′), "Debussy somewhat resumes, at measure 51, the situation as it was left some forty measures earlier: we find, in the melody's notes, the characteristic triplet of sixths played in back-and-forth motions at a fourth's distance; but it is accompanied, at the left hand, by a rhythmic simplification that continues the slowing effort undertaken between measures 10 and 11; this trend is maintained between measures 51 and 52, where the triplets are even abandoned for the rhythm of eighth notes". Measures 51–52 are shown below.

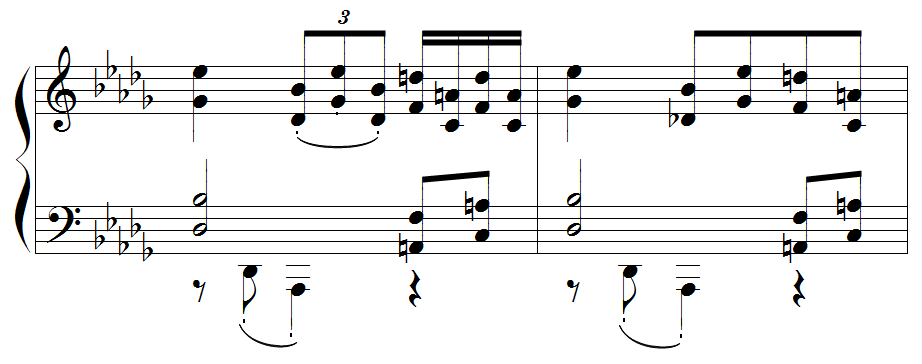

Thus, "what captures our attention is the pursuit of this purity, this elemental version, impossible to simplify further, a pursuit achieved through duplication and transcending the barrier of distances across the work. The search for the clear line through the progressive pruning of ornaments, the superfluous, the "useless", is indeed often, in Debussy, the raison d'être of duplication".

This concern for freedom comes with some exceptions to the A–B–A′ structure: according to Pierre Boulez, "in most of the Études, the form is created as it unfolds". Far from any repetition, these pieces work with a "material in constant evolution". In the étude Pour les accords, "the return of the toccata is initiated by a transition of 22 measures (106–127)". Above all, the étude Pour les quartes is entirely composed in "contrasts between a permanent shadow and fleeting bursts of light (mm. 74, 77, 79)". Guy Sacre notes that this étude "merely preludes, constantly changing tempo: twenty-three times in four pages!"

Drawing a connection between the Études, the Préludes, and the notion of impromptu, Vladimir Jankélévitch observes that "this continually initial character of the improvised work is recognizable at every step in Debussy: for example, the étude Pour les quartes, a capricious and inconstant poem-prelude with changing speeds, is a sort of perpetual preface that keeps us in suspense, waiting for something unknown – but the rhapsody of fourths expires without the announcement being fulfilled." Measures 80–85 are shown below.

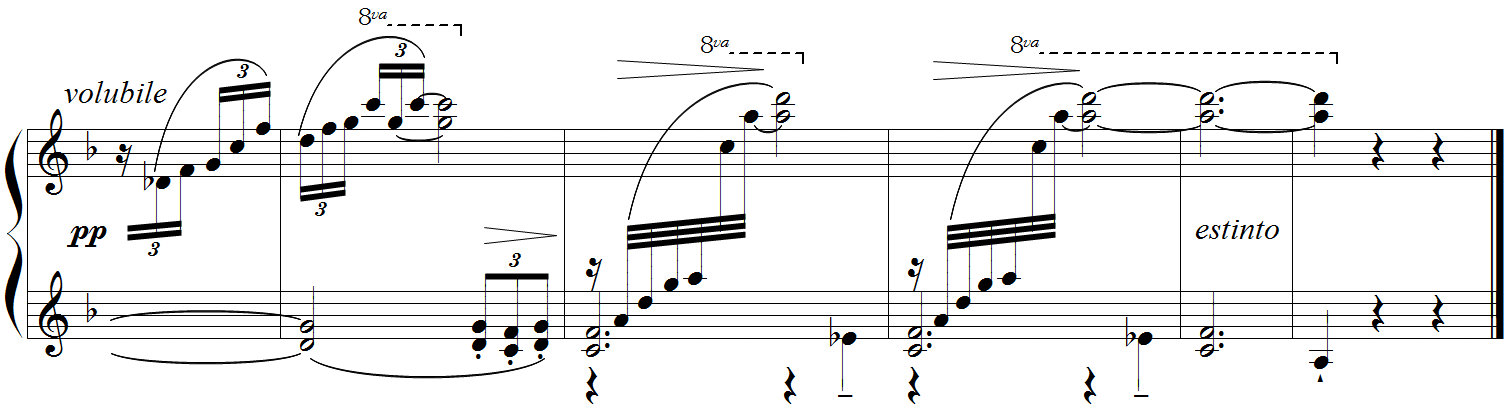

"And yet", comments Guy Sacre, "this disjointedness, which is that of reverie, has its internal logic; and nothing is more poetic than these melodic sketches that do not resolve". Didier Guigue also presents the étude Pour les sonorités opposées as "a sequence of ten moments articulated in a systematically discontinuous manner, that is, without transition or preparation, like a collage" to which he applies the methods and tools of spectral analysis. According to Harry Halbreich, "this masterpiece alone would suffice to refute the incomprehensible accusations of coldness and dryness long leveled against the Études". In concluding his analysis, Frank Dowe considers that this piece, like the étude Pour les accords, "The abiding impression left by this study is of an unexpected starkness in which impressionistic illusion has absolutely no place". Jan Michiels adds that this tenth étude, "lyrical, wonderfully illustrates Debussy's own words: 'Music is made for the inexpressible.'".

== Aesthetic perspectives ==
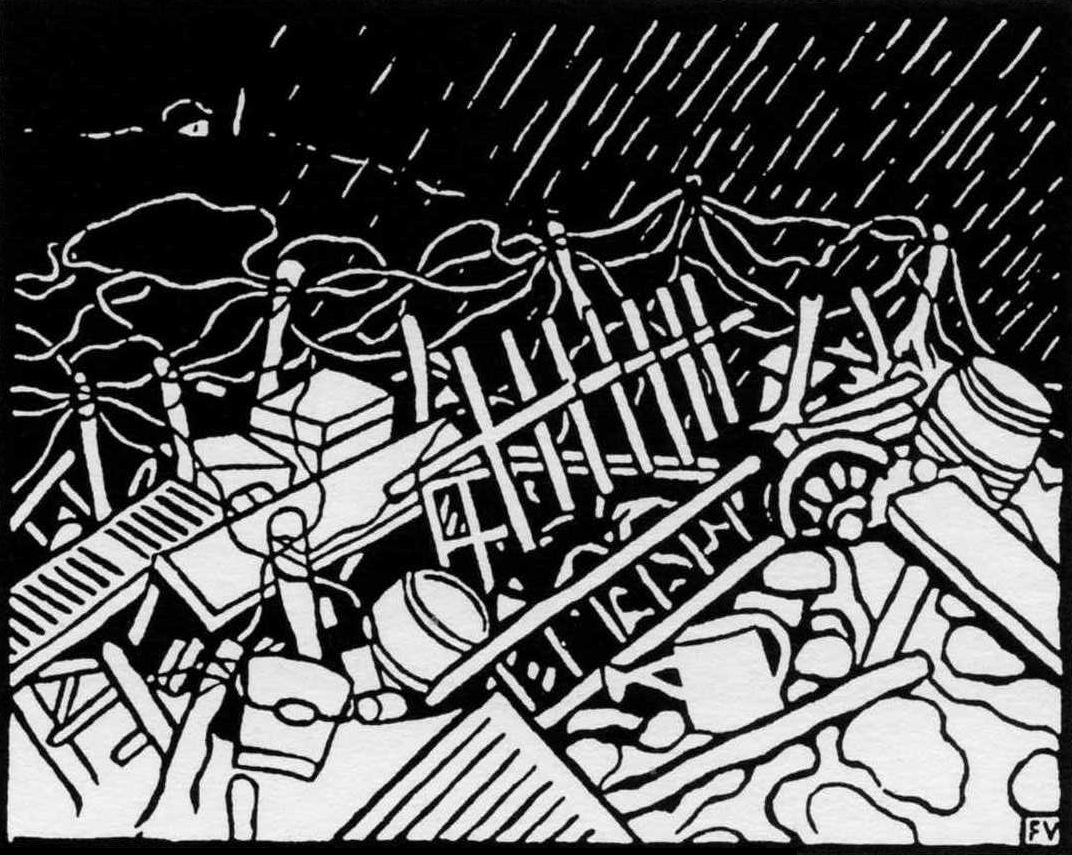
"The Lookout", woodcut by Félix Vallotton (This Is War V, 1916)

In his Études – "the supreme culmination of Debussy's piano writing" according to Harry Halbreich – the composer, "who sublimates his own language into a classicism broadly open to the future, achieves, despite this spareness, or rather because of it, the most sovereign freedom of language and expression. Here we find his most brilliantly revolutionary intuitions, the ones most pregnant with the future. The subsequent evolution of piano music is unthinkable without their example".

The Études belong to this tradition, which, according to Marguerite Long, "sum up twenty years of research and all of Debussy's characteristic technique?". In light of the pianistic tradition "of the great masters he deeply admired, Bach, Liszt, and Chopin", the formal language of this work appears all the more original as each piece is composed "of continuity in constant ruptures".

In his analysis of the Études, André Boucourechliev emphasizes this point: "Chopin is contradicted at every moment. Looking back through history, one stops at Beethoven, and even more at Gesualdo, that prince of continuous discontinuity...". According to him, Debussy's antecedents "are not Franck or Mussorgsky, but the anonymous composers of the Middle Ages, Monteverdi, and Gesualdo".

Harry Halbreich adopts the same perspective, seeing in Debussy "a liberator, as only Claudio Monteverdi had been before him". Marguerite Long confirms this link forged by Debussy between the Baroque aesthetic and the postmodern perspectives of the 20th century, based on her personal recollections:

Like Monteverdi, the musician employs the special alchemy invoked for the Études. It is now up to him to direct the beacons of intelligence and sensuality toward the mysteries of an art he adores.

Didier Guigue considers:

in this extremely singular and innovative project that is the Douze Études, whose musical interest took time to be recognized, Debussy ventures into then-unexplored territory, the importance of which we now know for the evolution of musical aesthetics in our century.

According to Anthony Girard,

through this asceticism, Debussy goes straight to the essential, perhaps at the expense of a certain sensual, charming indolence, and without further concessions to picturesque dreaminess, but in search of "something" more subtle, perhaps unattainable. In analyzing the Études, we reach the very essence of his language.

Drawing on the composer's testimony, Marguerite Long contrasts his aesthetic with that of Schumann, in a "striking and apt formula":

When the author of Carnaval exclaims:

– I would like to sing until I die, like the nightingale! I would like to make my piano burst!

Debussy merely recommends, in a low voice:

– Let it speak.

== Editions ==
- Claude Debussy, Études – Book I, Durand & Cie Publishers, Paris, 1916 (D.&F. 9406)
- Claude Debussy, Études – Book II, Durand & Cie Publishers, Paris, 1916 (D.&F. 9407)

Non-French editions

- Claude Debussy, Études, Peters, Leipzig, 1970, (ed. E. Klemm)
- Claude Debussy, Études, Peters, London-Frankfurt, 1975, (ed. H. Swarsenski)
- Debussy, Claude (1998). Kocses, Zoltán (ed.). 12 Études. K 247. Budapest: Könemann. OCLC 43047898.
- Claude Debussy, Étude retrouvée, Theodore Presser, Bryn Mawr, New York, 1980 (ed. R. Howat)
- Claude Debussy, Études, Schott, 2016 OCLC 949951220

== Bibliography ==
=== General works ===
- Aguettant, Louis (1954). La Musique de piano: des origines à Ravel [Piano Music: from origins to Ravel]. Les Introuvables (in French). Paris: Albin Michel / L'Harmattan. Republished 1999 as ISBN 978-2-738-48141-2.
- de Candé, Roland (2000). Les chefs-d'œuvre classiques de la musique [Classical Music Masterpieces] (in French). Paris: Seuil. ISBN 2-02-039863-X. OCLC 46473027.
- Debussy, Claude (1987). Monsieur Croche, antidilettante [Monsieur Croche, Anti-Dilettante]. L'Imaginaire (in French). Paris: Gallimard. ISBN 978-2-07-071107-9.
- Debussy, Claude (2005). François Lesure; Didier Herlin (eds.). Correspondance, 1872–1918 [Correspondence, 1872–1918] (in French). Paris: Éditions Gallimard. ISBN 2-07-077255-1.
- Goléa, Antoine (1977). La musique, de la nuit des temps aux aurores nouvelles [Music, from the Dawn of Time to New Horizons] (in French). Paris: Alphonse Leduc et Cie. ISBN 2-85689-001-6.
- Jankélévitch, Vladimir (1974). L'Irréversible et la nostalgie [The Irreversible and Nostalgia]. Champs essais (in French). Paris: Flammarion. ISBN 978-2-0812-5244-8.
- Jankélévitch, Vladimir (1983). La Présence lointaine: Albéniz, Séverac, Mompou [The Distant Presence: Albéniz, Séverac, Mompou] (in French). Paris: Seuil. ISBN 2-02-006451-0. OCLC 878007974.
- Landormy, Paul (1943). La Musique française de Franck à Debussy [French Music from Franck to Debussy] (in French). Paris: Gallimard. Republished as ISBN 2-07-023708-7.
- Sacre, Guy (1998). La musique pour piano: dictionnaire des compositeurs et des œuvres [Piano Music: dictionary of composers and works]. Bouquins (in French). Vol. I (A–I). Paris: Robert Laffont. ISBN 978-2-221-05017-0.
- Sacre, Guy (1998). La musique pour piano: dictionnaire des compositeurs et des œuvres [Piano Music: dictionary of composers and works]. Bouquins (in French). Vol. II (J–Z). Paris: Robert Laffont. ISBN 978-2-221-08566-0.
- Slonimsky, Nicolas (1948). Slonimsky's Book of Musical Anecdotes. New York: Routledge. Republished 2002 as ISBN 0-415-93938-0.
- Slonimsky, Nicolas (1971) [1937]. Music since 1900 (4 ed.). New York: Éditions Scribner.

=== Monographs ===
- Barraqué, Jean (1962). Debussy. Solfèges (in French). Paris: Seuil. Republished in 1994 as ISBN 978-2-02-020626-6
- Boucourechliev, André (1998). Debussy, la révolution subtile [Debussy, the Subtle Revolution]. Les Chemins de la musique (in French). Paris: Fayard. ISBN 978-2-213-60030-7.
- Citron, Pierre (1963). Bartók. Solfèges (in French). Paris: Seuil. Republished 1994 as ISBN 978-2-02-018417-5.
- Depaulis, Jacques (2001). Roger-Ducasse. Carré Musique (in French). Anglet: Éditions Séguier. ISBN 2-84049-252-0.
- Ferchault, Guy (1948). Dufourcq, Norbert (ed.). Claude Debussy. Euterpe (in French). Paris: La Colombe.
- Goléa, Antoine (1966). Claude Debussy. Musiciens de tous les temps (in French). Paris: Éditions Seghers.
- Goubault, Christian (1986). Claude Debussy. Musichamp l'essentiel (in French). Paris: Éditions Honoré Champion. ISBN 2-85203-013-6.
- Goubault, Christian (2002). Claude Debussy, la musique à vif [Claude Debussy, Music Laid Bare]. Musique ouverte (in French). Paris: Minerve. ISBN 2-86931-102-8.
- Jankélévitch, Vladimir (1956). Ravel. Solfèges (in French). Paris: Seuil. Republished 1995 as ISBN 978-2-02-023490-0.
- Jankélévitch, Vladimir (1976). Debussy et le mystère de l'instant [Debussy and the Mystery of the Instant] (in French). Paris: Plon. ISBN 2-259-00000-2.
- Joos, Maxime (2004). Claude Debussy, jeux de formes [Claude Debussy, Games of Forms]. Æsthetica (in French). Paris: Éditions Rue d'Ulm. ISBN 2-7288-0327-7.
- Lockspeiser, Edward; Halbreich, Harry (1980). Claude Debussy (in French). Paris: Fayard. ISBN 2-213-00921-X.
- Lockspeiser, Edward (1980). Claude Debussy, sa vie et sa pensée [Claude Debussy, His Life and Thought] (in French). Paris: Fayard.
- Halbreich, Harry (1980). Claude Debussy, analyse de l'œuvre [Claude Debussy, Analysis of the Work] (in French). Paris: Fayard. pp. 533–748.
- Macassar, Gilles; Mérigaud, Bernard (1992). Claude Debussy: le plaisir et la passion [Claude Debussy: Pleasure and Passion]. Découverte (in French). Paris: Gallimard. ISBN 2-07-053224-0.
- Parks, Richard S. (1989). The music of Claude Debussy. New Haven: Yale University Press. ISBN 0-300-04439-9.
- Rey, Anne (1974) [1974]. Satie. Solfèges (in French). Paris: Seuil. Rey1974. Republished 1995 as ISBN 978-2-02-023487-0.
- Roberts, Paul (1996). Images: The piano music of Claude Debussy. Portland: Amadeus Press. ISBN 0-931340-97-7.
- Schmitz, E. Robert (1950). The piano works of Claude Debussy. New York: Dover Publications.
- Strobel, Heinrich (1952). Claude Debussy. Amour de la Musique (in French). Paris: Le Bon Plaisir, Librairie Plon.
- Vivier, Odile (1987). Varèse. solfèges (in French). Paris: Seuil. ISBN 2-02-000254-X.
- Volta, Ornella (1979). L'Ymagier d'Erik Satie [The Imagier of Erik Satie] (in French). Paris: Francis van de Velde. ISBN 2-86299-007-8.
- Vuillermoz, Émile (1957). Claude Debussy. Les grands compositeurs du XXe siècle (in French). Genève: René Kister.
- Heggstad, Håkon (2018). Claude Debussy: Douze études – En kritisk analyse [Claude Debussy: Twelve Études – A Critical Analysis] (Master's thesis) (in Norwegian). Oslo: University of Oslo. pp. xiv–108.

=== Articles and analyses ===
- Bourion, Sylveline (2011). Le style de Claude Debussy: duplication, répétition et dualité dans les stratégies de composition [The Style of Claude Debussy: duplication, repetition and duality in composing strategies]. Musicologies (in French). Bruxelles: Vrin. p. 514. ISBN 978-2-7116-2370-9.
- Cocteau, Jean (1915). "Nous voudrions vous dire un mot. Réponse à de jeunes musiciens" [We Would Like to Say a Word. Response to Young Musicians]. Le mot (in French) (12). Paris.
- Collectif (1920). "Debussy" (PDF). La Revue musicale (in French) (1). Paris.
- Suarès, André (1920). Debussy (in French). Paris: La Revue musicale. pp. 98–126.
- Cortot, Alfred (1920). La Musique pour piano de Claude Debussy [The Piano Music of Claude Debussy] (in French). Paris: La Revue musicale. pp. 127–150.
- Collectif (2009). Tranchefort, François-René (ed.). L'analyse musicale: une pratique et son histoire [Musical Analysis: a practice and its history]. Musique et recherche (in French). Genève: Librairie Droz. p. 455. ISBN 978-2-600-01282-9.
- Borio, Gianmario (2009). La réception de l'œuvre de Debussy par les compositeurs sériels [The Reception of Debussy's Work by Serial Composers] (in French). Translated by Raiola, Marilène. pp. 197–222.
- Collectif (2013). Regards sur Debussy [Perspectives on Debussy] (in French). Paris: Fayard. p. 580. ISBN 978-2-213-67258-8.
  - Boulez, Pierre (2013). Préface [Preface] (in French). pp. 9–15.
  - Becker, Annette (2013). Debussy en grande guerre [Debussy in the Great War] (in French). pp. 57–68.
  - Duchêne-Thégarid, Marie; Fanjul, Diane (2013). Apprendre à interpréter la musique pour piano de Debussy au Conservatoire de Paris entre 1920 et 1960 [Learning to Interpret Debussy's Piano Music at the Paris Conservatoire between 1920 and 1960] (in French). pp. 279–299.
- Tranchefort, François-René, ed. (1987). Guide de la musique de piano et de clavecin [Guide to Piano and Harpsichord Music]. Les Indispensables de la musique (in French). Paris: Fayard. p. 870. ISBN 978-2-213-01639-9.
  - Halbreich, Harry (1987a). "Béla Bartók". In Tranchefort (1987), p. 78–89.
  - Poirier, Alain (1987a). "André Boucourechliev". In Tranchefort (1987), pp. 157–158.
  - Poirier, Alain (1987b). "Maurice Ohana". In Tranchefort (1987), pp. 555–557.
- Dowe, Frank (1969). BBC Music Guides: Debussy Piano music. Seattle: University of Washington Press. p. 64.
- Girard, Anthony (2007). Le langage musical de Debussy dans les Douze études pour piano [The Musical Language of Debussy in the Twelve Piano Études]. Les cahiers d'analyse musicale (in French). Paris: Gérard Billaudot Éditeur. p. 56. OCLC 243709207.
- Guigue, Didier (2000). Une étude « pour les sonorités opposées » [An Étude "for Opposing Sonorities"] (in French). Paris: Presses universitaires du Septentrion. p. 544. ISBN 2-284-00138-6.
- Howat, Roy (1977). "A thirteenth Étude of 1915: The original version pour les arpèges composés". Cahiers Debussy, nouvelle série (1). Genève: Minkoff: 16–23.
- Herlin, Didier (2007). Douche, Sylvie (ed.). Maurice Emmanuel: Un regard impartial sur Debussy, article extrait de Maurice Emmanuel, compositeur français, Université de Paris-Sorbonne (Paris IV) [Maurice Emmanuel: An Impartial Perspective on Debussy, article excerpted from Maurice Emmanuel, French Composer, University of Paris-Sorbonne (Paris IV)] (in French). Prague: Bärenreiter. ISBN 978-80-86385-34-1.
- Jankélévitch, Vladimir (1953). "De l'Improvisation" [On Improvisation]. Archivio di Filosofia (in French). Rome: 47–76.
- Jankélévitch, Vladimir (1998). Liszt, rhapsodie et improvisation [Liszt, Rhapsody and Improvisation] (in French). Paris: Flammarion. ISBN 2-08-067686-5.
- Long, Marguerite (1960). Au piano avec Claude Debussy [At the Piano with Claude Debussy] (in French). Paris: Gérard Billaudot. p. 169.
- Timbrell, Charles (1987). "Walter Morse Rummel, Debussy's prince of virtuosos". Cahiers Debussy (11). Paris: 24–33.
- Volta, Ornella (1993). Satie/Cocteau [Satie/Cocteau] (in French). Paris: Le Castor astral. p. 176. ISBN 2-85920-208-0.
- Wong, Lucas (Summer 2016). "Humour in late Debussy: multiple perspectives on "Douze études"". The Musical Times. 157 (1935). Musical Times Publications: 77–98. ISSN 0027-4666. JSTOR 44862507. OCLC 9970484220.

=== Discographic notes ===
- Boscheron, Hélène, ed. (2006). Robert Casadesus, le voyage imaginaire (Media notes) (in French). Jean-François Bouvery. Paris: Opus Millésime. pp. 2–15. GCK 20061.
- Cassard, Philippe, ed. (1995). Le choix d'un piano, ou les sonorités d'un univers (Media notes) (in French). Paris: Astrée. pp. 4–6. E 8549.
- Crossley, Paul, ed. (1993). Études de Debussy (Media notes) (in French). Translated by Dennis Collins. New York: Sony. pp. 9–12. SK 53 281.
- Gallois, Jean, ed. (1992). Autour des Études de Debussy (Media notes) (in French). Aldo Ciccolini. Paris: EMI. p. 4. CDC 7 54450 2.
- Huverdartung, Sliv, ed. (2018). Douze Études de Karol Beffa (Media notes) (in French). Tristan Pfaff. Paris: Ad Vitam. pp. 2–5. AV 180915.
- Jungheinrich, Hans-Klaus, ed. (2017). Punkt une Linie – Klavieretüden von Claude Debussy une Toshio Hosokawa (Media notes) (in German). Translated by J. Bradford Robinson. Munich: ECM New Series. pp. 12–18.
- Michiels, Jan, ed. (2011). Quelques notes sur le chant du cygne pianistique de Debussy, ses dernières lettres et le premier hommage au musicien français... (PDF) (Media notes) (in Dutch). Translated by Michel Stockhem. Bruxelles: Outhere. pp. 13–14. FUG590.
- Nommick, Yvan, ed. (2013). Chopin et Debussy, deux chercheurs d'absolu (Media notes) (in French). Javier Perianes. Paris: Harmonia Mundi. pp. 3–4. HMC 902164.
- Petazzi, Paolo, ed. (1993). Études de Debussy (Media notes) (in Italian). Translated by Camillo Faverzani. Maurizio Pollini. Berlin: Deutsche Grammophon. pp. 9–11. 423 678-2.
