= List of compositions by Claude Debussy =

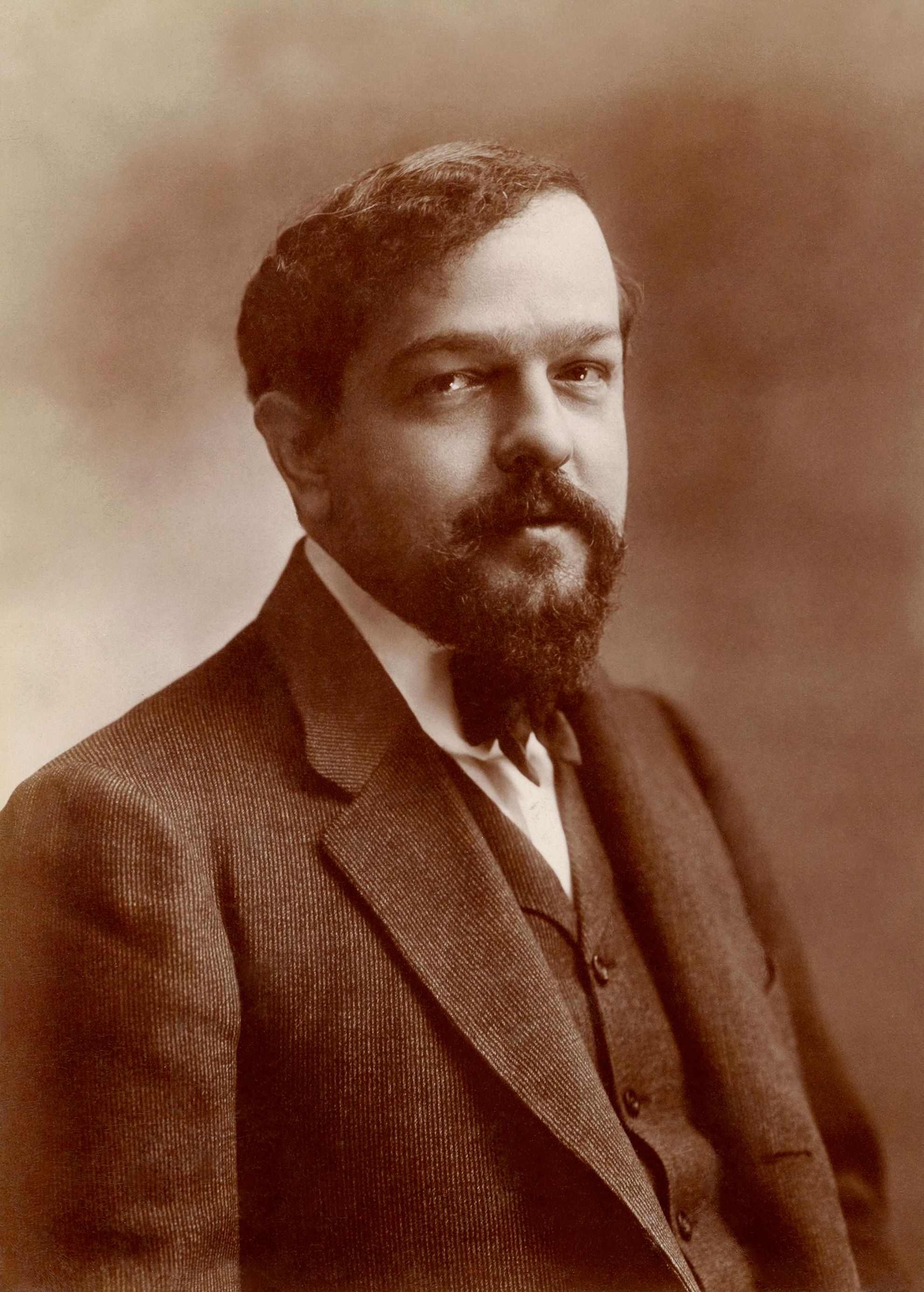
Claude Debussy c. 1910

This is a list of compositions by Claude Debussy categorized by genre, and sorted within each genre by "L²" number, according to the 2001 revised catalogue by musicologist François Lesure, which is generally in chronological order of composition date.

(For convenience, the "L¹" numbers from Lesure's original 1977 catalogue are also shown below. They were widely used on recordings, and so on, for twenty years.)

(The "L¹" and "L²" headers can be clicked on to sort the entire list by either numbering. A second click will reverse the order. Reloading the webpage will restore the genre-category order.)

== List of compositions ==
L²	L¹	Title	Scoring	Date	Notes
=== Orchestral ===
33b	38	Le Triomphe de Bacchus, suite	orchestra	1882	lost, but re-orchestrated 1927 by Marius-François Gaillard from the 3 surviving movements (1, 2, and 4) of the piano duet version L 33a
46b	50b	Première Suite d'Orchestre: 1. Fête; 2. Ballet; 3. Rêve; 4. Cortège et Bacchanale	orchestra	1883	orchestration of L 46a; 3rd mvt lost
63b	60b	Ariettes oubliées, suite: 1. Le vent dans la plaine suspend son haleine 2. Aquarelles: Green	orchestra	1912	orchestration of L 63a No.1 & 5 by André Caplet under Debussy's supervision
68b	61b	Printemps, Suite Symphonique	orchestra (with piano four-hands, harp)	1912	orchestral version of L 68a by Henri Büsser under Debussy's supervision
71b	65b	Petite Suite: 1. En bateau 2. Cortège; 3. Menuet; 4. Ballet	orchestra	1907	orchestral version of L 71a by Henri Büsser under Debussy's supervision
83b	77	Marche écossaise sur un thème populaire	orchestra	1893–1908	orchestration of L 83a
87a	86a	Prélude à l'après-midi d'un faune	orchestra	1891–94	
92	83	3 Scènes au crépuscule	orchestra	1892–93	1st version of L 98; lost
–	–	Orchestration of Erik Satie's Gymnopédies: 1. Lent et grave 2. Lent et douloureux	orchestra	1897	Satie's 1st and 3rd Gymnopédies only, in reverse order: "Lent et grave" and "Lent et douloureux" are Satie's 3rd and 1st respectively.
98	91	Nocturnes: 1. Nuages; 2. Fêtes; 3. Sirènes	orchestra (III. with female chorus)	1897–99	3rd version of L 92 & 3 Nocturnes for violin and orchestra
111	109	La Mer, Trois esquisses symphoniques: 1. De l'aube à midi sur la mer 2. Jeux de vagues 3. Dialogue du vent et de la mer	orchestra	1903–05	revised 1908
118	122	Images, Set 3: 1. Gigues; 2. Ibéria; 1. Par les rues et par les chemins; 2. Les parfums de la nuit; 3. Le matin d'un jour de fête 3. Rondes du printemps	orchestra	1905–12	I. composed 1909–12; II. composed 1905–08; III. composed 1905–09?
–	–	Children's Corner: 1. Doctor Gradus ad Parnassum; 2. Jimbo's Lullaby; 3. Serenade of the Doll; 4. The Snow Is Dancing; 5. The Little Shepherd; 6. Golliwogg's Cakewalk	orchestra	1910	orchestration of L 119 by André Caplet under Debussy's supervision
–	121b	La plus que lente	orchestra	1910	arrangement of L 128
–	–	Le Martyre de Saint Sébastien, Fragments symphoniques: 1. La Cour des Lys: Prélude (Act I No. 1); 2. Danse extatique et Final du 1er Acte (Act I No. 3); 3. La Passion (Act III No. 4); 4. Le bon pasteur (Act IV Nos. 1 & 2)	orchestra	1911	arrangement of selections from L 130 by André Caplet, under Debussy's supervision
140b	132b	Berceuse héroïque	orchestra	1914	arrangement of L 140a
=== Concertante ===
40a	27a	Intermezzo	cello, orchestra	1882	
72	73	Fantaisie	piano, orchestra	1889–90	
–	–	3 Nocturnes	violin, orchestra	1894–96	2nd version of L 98; lost
–	98b	Rhapsodie	alto saxophone, orchestra	1919	orchestration of L 104 by Jean Roger-Ducasse
113	103a	Danses: 1. Danse sacrée 2. Danse profane	cross-strung harp, string orchestra	1904	alternate versions: the published score indicates that the harp part can also be played on regular (pedal) harp or piano
124b	116b	Première Rhapsodie	clarinet, orchestra	1911	orchestration of L 124a
=== Chamber ===
5	3	Piano Trio in G major: 1. Andantino con moto allegro 2. Scherzo – Intermezzo. Moderato con allegro 3. Andante espressivo 4. Finale. Appassionato	piano, violin, cello	1880	discovered 1982, published 1986
–	–	Nocturne et Scherzo	violin, piano	1882	lost
39	26	Nocturne et Scherzo	cello, piano	1882	arrangement of violin & piano version; only Scherzo survives
40b	27b	Intermezzo	cello, piano	1882	arrangement of L 40a
91	85	String Quartet in G minor: 1. Animé et très décidé 2. Assez vif et bien rythmé 3. Andantino, doucement expressif 4. Très modéré	2 violins, viola, cello	1892–93	published as Opus 10
104	98a	Rhapsodie	alto saxophone, piano	1901–11	
124a	116a	Première Rhapsodie	clarinet, piano	1909–10	
127	120	Petite pièce	clarinet, piano	1910	piece for the 1910 sightreading examinations of the clarinet classes at the Conservatoire de Paris
137	129	Syrinx	flute	1913	incidental music for the play Psyché by Gabriel Mourey
144	135	Sonata No. 1: 1. Prologue; 2. Sérénade; 3. Finale	cello, piano	1915	
145	137	Sonata No. 2: 1. Pastorale; 2. Interlude; 3. Finale	flute, viola, harp	1915	
148	140	Sonata No. 3: 1. Allegro vivo 2. Intermède. Fantasque et léger 3. Finale. Très animé	violin, piano	1916–17	
=== Piano solo ===
4	9	Danse bohémienne	piano	1880	
–	–	Intermède	piano	1882	transcription of 2nd mvt of Piano Trio L 5
74	66	Deux arabesques: 1. Première Arabesque; 2. Deuxième Arabesque	piano	1890–91	1. composed 1890; 2. composed 1891
75	67	Mazurka	piano	1890–91	
76	68	Rêverie	piano	1890	
77	69	Tarantelle styrienne	piano	1890	revised c.1901 as Danse
78	70	Ballade slave	piano	1890	revised c.1901 as Ballade
79	71	Valse romantique	piano	1890	revised c.1901
82	75	Suite bergamasque: 1. Prélude; 2. Menuet; 3. Clair de lune 4. Passepied	piano	1890–91	revised 1905; III. original 1890 title Promenade sentimentale; IV. original 1890 title Pavane; (Note: L # in Lesure catalog (2001) has 82a, but there is no 82b or 82. Possibly a typo, or there was an 82b which was intentionally removed and the number never got changed.)
89	82	Nocturne	piano	1892	
–	–	Pelléas et Mélisande, opera in 5 acts	voices, piano	1893–1902	piano reduction of orchestra part
94	87	Images: 1. Lent, mélancolique et doux 2. Souvenir du Louvre; 3. Quelques aspects de "nous n'irons plus au bois"	piano	1894	published as Images oubliées; II. 1st version of Sarabande from Pour le piano L 95
95	95	Pour le piano, suite: 1. Prélude; 2. Sarabande; 3. Toccata	piano	1894–1901	II. 2nd revised version of Souvenir du Louvre from Images oubliées L 94
105	110	Images, Set 1: 1. Reflets dans l'eau 2. Hommage à Rameau; 3. Mouvement	piano	1901–05	
108	100	Estampes: 1. Pagodes; 2. La soirée dans Grenade; 3. Jardins sous la pluie	piano	1903	
109	106	L'isle joyeuse	piano	1903–04	
110	105	Masques	piano	1903–04	
112	99	D'un cahier d'esquisses	piano	1904	
117	108	Pièce pour piano (Morceau de concours)	piano	1904	written for a "guess the composer" contest in Musica magazine
–	–	Les accords de septième regrettent !!!	piano	1905	nine-measure fragment written as a birthday present for Debussy's fiancée Emma Bardac
119	113	Children's Corner: 1. Doctor Gradus ad Parnassum; 2. Jimbo's Lullaby; 3. Serenade of the Doll; 4. The Snow Is Dancing; 5. The Little Shepherd; 6. Golliwogg's Cakewalk	piano	1906–08	Debussy gave the title of the work and the movement titles in English on his manuscript
120	111	Images, Set 2: 1. Cloches à travers les feuilles 2. Et la lune descend sur le temple qui fut 3. Poissons d'or	piano	1907	
122	114	Le petit Nègre	piano	1909	also published as "Cake-Walk"
123	115	Hommage à Haydn	piano	1909	first movement of the collective Hommage à Joseph Haydn collaboration by six composers
125	117	Préludes, Book 1: 1. Danseuses de Delphes (Lent et grave); 2. Voiles (Modéré); 3. Le Vent dans la plaine (Animé); 4. "Les Sons et les parfums tournent dans l'air du soir" (Modéré); 5. Les Collines d'Anacapri (Très modéré); 6. Des pas sur la neige (Triste et lent); 7. Ce qu'a vu le vent d'Ouest (Animé et tumultueux); 8. La Fille aux cheveux de lin (Très calme et doucement expressif); 9. La Sérénade interrompue (Modérément animé); 10. La Cathédrale engloutie (Profondément calme); 11. La Danse de Puck (Capricieux et léger); 12. Minstrels (Modéré)	piano	1909–10	
128	121a	La plus que lente	piano	1910	
131	123	Préludes, Book 2: 1. Brouillards (Modéré); 2. Feuilles mortes (Lent et mélancolique); 3. La Puerta del Vino (Mouvement de Habanera); 4. "Les Fées sont d'exquises danseuses" (Rapide et léger); 5. Bruyères (Calme, doucement expressif); 6. Général Lavine – eccentric (Dans le style et le Mouvement d'un Cake-Walk); 7. La Terrasse des audiences du clair de lune (Lent); 8. Ondine (Scherzando); 9. Hommage à S. Pickwick Esq. P.P.M.P.C. (Grave); 10. Canope (Très calme et doucement triste); 11. Les Tierces alternées (Modérément animé); 12. Feux d'artifice (Modérément animé)	piano	1912–13	
–	131b	Six Épigraphes antiques: 1. Pour invoquer Pan, dieu du vent d'été 2. Pour un tombeau sans nom 3. Pour que la nuit soit propice 4. Pour la danseuse aux crotales 5. Pour l'Égyptienne; 6. Pour remercier la pluie au matin	piano	1915	arrangement of L 139
140a	132a	Berceuse héroïque	piano	1914	
141	133	Pièce pour l'œuvre du Vêtement du blessé (Page d'album)	piano	1915	composed to aid fundraising efforts for wounded soldiers in World War I
143	136	Douze Études: 1. Pour les "cinq doigts", d'après monsieur Czerny (five fingers, after Czerny); 2. Pour les tierces (thirds); 3. Pour les quartes (fourths); 4. Pour les sixtes (sixths); 5. Pour les octaves (octaves); 6. Pour les huit doigts (eight fingers); 7. Pour les degrés chromatiques (chromatic degrees); 8. Pour les agréments (ornaments); 9. Pour les notes répétées (repeated notes); 10. Pour les sonorités opposées (opposing sonorities); 11. Pour les arpèges composés (composite arpeggios); 12. Pour les accords (chords)	piano	1915	
143a	–	Étude pour les arpèges composés	piano	1915	an alternate piece for No. 11 of Douze Études L 143, it has no musical relation to that piece, though Debussy composed the two simultaneously; discovered 1977, published as Étude retrouvée
146	138	Élégie	piano	1915	
150	–	Les Soirs illuminés par l'ardeur du charbon	piano	1917	discovered November 2001, published 2003 title from Charles Baudelaire's poem Le Balcon
–	–	Rapsodie in the Style of Liszt	piano		lost
=== Piano duo ===
8	10	Symphony in B minor	piano four-hands	1880–81	published 1933, premièred 1989 Orchestrated by Tony Finno
10	–	Andante cantabile and Tempo di Marcia Funebra	piano four-hands	1881	2nd movement incomplete, 16 bars only
20	–	Diane, Overture	piano four-hands	1881	this overture and the vocal duet L 48 are all that survive of the unfinished opera Diane; premiered 1989, published 2002
33a	38	Le Triomphe de Bacchus: 1. Divertissement; 2. Andante; 3. Scherzo; 4. Marche et Bacchanale	piano four-hands	1882	arrangement of lost orchestral suite; III. lost; IV. lost except for 2 fragments
40c	27c	Intermezzo	piano four-hands	1882	arrangement of L 40a
46a	50a	Première Suite d'Orchestre: 1. Fête; 2. Ballet; 3. Rêve; 4. Cortège et Bacchanale	piano, four-hands	1883	reduction of L 46b
–	–	L'enfant prodigue: 1. Prélude; 2. Cortège; 3. Air de danse	piano four-hands		transcription of the instrumental mvts of L 61 (No.1 & 4)
62	36	Divertissement	piano four-hands	1884	
71a	65a	Petite Suite: 1. En bateau 2. Cortège; 3. Menuet; 4. Ballet	piano four-hands	1888–89	
83a	77	Marche écossaise sur un thème populaire	piano four-hands	1890	
87b	86b	Prélude à l'après-midi d'un faune	2 pianos	1895	
103	97	Lindaraja	2 pianos	1901	
–	103b	Danses: 1. Danse sacrée 2. Danse profane	2 pianos	1904	arrangement of L 113a
139	131a	Six Épigraphes antiques: 1. Pour invoquer Pan, dieu du vent d'été 2. Pour un tombeau sans nom 3. Pour que la nuit soit propice 4. Pour la danseuse aux crotales 5. Pour l'Égyptienne; 6. Pour remercier la pluie au matin	piano four-hands	1914–15	arrangement of 6 pieces from Chansons de Bilitis L 102
142	134	En blanc et noir	2 pianos	1915	original title Caprices en blanc et noir
=== Stage ===
–	–	Hélène, opera, after the poème antique by Leconte de Lisle	opera	1881	unfinished, one fragment only: Helène: Franchis les mers icariennes (solo with chorus) L 14
–	–	Diane au bois, opera, after the play by Théodore de Banville	opera	1881–86	unfinished; lost, only two pieces survive: the Overture in a piano four-hands reduction L 20, and fragments of a vocal duet with accompaniment in piano reduction L 48
–	37	Hymnis_{[fr]}, opera, after the play by Théodore de Banville	voice, chorus, orchestra	1882	unfinished; lost, only two pieces survive with accompaniment in piano reductions: Il dort encore (aria from Scene 1) L 34, and Ode Bachique (vocal duet) L 41
–	–	Salammbô, opera, after the novel by Gustave Flaubert	opera	1885	sketches only
80	72	Rodrigue et Chimène, opera in 3 acts	opera	1890–93	libretto: Catulle Mendès; 2 scenes lost; complete except for sketches for the orchestration; "reconstituted" from the mss in 1987 by Richard Langham Smith, orchestrated 1993 by Edison Denisov
93	88	Pelléas et Mélisande, opera in 5 acts	opera	1893–1902	libretto: Maurice Maeterlinck
100	93	La tragédie de la mort, incidental music for the play by René Peter	voices, orchestra	1899	text: René Peter; unfinished, one piece only: Berceuse: Il était une fois une fée qui avait un beau sceptre (solo), scored for solo voice without accompaniment
102	96	Musique de scène pour Les Chansons de Bilitis, incidental music: 1. Chant pastoral 2. Les Comparaisons; 3. Les Contes; 4. Chanson; 5. La Partie d'osselets 6. Bilitis; 7. Le Tombeau sans nom 8. Les Courtisanes Égyptiennes; 9. L'Eau pure du bassin 10. La Danseuse aux crotales 11. Le Souvenir de Mnasidica; 12. La Pluie du matin	narrator, 2 flutes, 2 harps, celesta	1900–01	text: Pierre Louÿs; three of the pieces are arrangements of L 97
106	101	Le Diable dans le beffroi, short opera based on Poe's "The Devil in the Belfry"	opera	1902–11	libretto: Debussy; unfinished
116	107	Le Roi Lear, incidental music to the Shakespeare play "King Lear"	orchestra	1904	unfinished, 7 sections sketched; 2 sections (Fanfare d'ouverture, Le Sommeil de Lear) completed and orchestrated by Jean Roger-Ducasse 1926
121	112	La Chute de la maison Usher, short opera based on Poe's "The Fall of the House of Usher"	opera	1908–17	text: Debussy; unfinished; completed, revised, and orchestrated by Juan Allende-Blin 1979; also completed (new version) by Robert Orledge 2013
130	124	Le Martyre de Saint Sébastien, Mystère en 5 acts et 5 maisons, incidental music to the play by Gabriele D'Annunzio in 5 acts: 1. La Cour des lys; 1. Prélude (2 contraltos); 2. Sébastien! (MMCCTTBB chorus); 3. Danse extatique et final (Miracle!) (2 contraltos, SSMC chorus); 2. La Chambre magique; 1. Prélude; 2. Erigonum melos (… de tous les rêves qui renaissent) (soprano); 3. Seigneur Amour, voici ma vie (soprano); 3. Le Concile des faux dieux; 1. Prélude: Fanfare No. 1; 2. Fanfare No. 2; 3. Aveuglez l'impie! (TB chorus); 4. Semblable à l'anémone en fleur (soprano, SM chorus, SM chorus); 5. Et pourquoi cherchez-vous parmi les morts celui qui est vivant? (soprano, SM chorus); 6. Annoncez l'étoile future au ciel romain (MCTT chorus); 7. Il se meurt, le bel Adonis (MMCCTT chorus); 4. Le Laurier blessé; 1. Prélude; 2. Voyez, je sens que dans la paume de ma main gauche la blessure se rouvre et saigne; 3. Des profondeurs, j'appelle votre amour terrible (SSCTTB chorus); 5. Le Paradis; 1. Interlude; 2. Chorus martyrum (TTBB chorus) – Chorus virginum (SMC chorus) – Chorus apostolorum (TTBB chorus) – Chorus angelorum (SSCC chorus) – Anima Sebastiani (soprano, SSCCTTBB) – Chorus sanctorum omnium (soprano, SSMMCCTTBB chorus)	soprano, 2 contraltos, various chorus, orchestra	1911	libretto: Gabriele D'Annunzio; orchestrated by André Caplet in collaboration with Debussy
–	–	Le Martyre de Saint Sébastien	soprano, 2 contraltos, various chorus, piano	1911	piano reduction of orchestra part of L 130 by André Caplet and Debussy
132b	125a	Khamma, légende dansée, ballet	piano	1911–12	original title Isis; original version scored for piano
132a	125b	Khamma, légende dansée, ballet	orchestra	1912	orchestration of L 132b unfinished, completed by Charles Koechlin 1913
133	126	Jeux, poème dansé, ballet	orchestra	1912–13	
134	104a	Fêtes galantes, Ballade en 3 tableux, opera-ballet after poems by Paul Verlaine	opera	1912–15	original title Crimen amoris; libretto: Louis Laloy and Charles Morice; unfinished, possibly never written; lost
136a	128	La Boîte à joujoux, Ballet pour enfants: 1. Prélude: Le Sommeil de la boîte 2. 1er tableau: Le Magasin de jouets – Valse: Danse de la poupée 3. 2e tableau: Le Champ de bataille 4. 3e tableau: La Bergerie à vendre 5. 4e tableau: Après fortune faite 6. Épilogue	piano	1913	original version scored for piano
136b	–	La Boîte à joujoux, Ballet pour enfants	orchestra	1919	orchestration of L 136a by André Caplet per Debussy's instructions
–	–	Psyché, incidental music for the play by Gabriel Mourey	orchestra	1913	lost, except for Flûte de Pan retitled Syrinx L 137, the rest possibly never written
138	130	No-Ja-Li ou Le palais du silence, Chinese ballet	orchestra	1914	unfinished, reconstructed by Robert Orledge 2005, revised 2012 and 2014, premiered 2015
=== Choral ===
14	20a	Helène: Franchis les mers icariennes	soprano, mixed chorus, orchestra	1881	text: Leconte de Lisle; fragments; from the unfinished opera Hélène
Anh	–	Fugue pour le concours de fugue	4-part chorus	1881	
–	–	Choeur des brises: Réveillez-vous, arbres des bois	soprano, female chorus, piano four-hands	1882	sketch
32	35	Choeur des brises: Réveillez-vous, arbres des bois	soprano, 3-part female chorus	1882	text: Louis Bouilhet
37a	24a	Printemps: Salut printemps, jeune saison, cantata	female chorus, orchestra	1882	text: Anatole de Ségur
37b	–	Printemps: Salut printemps, jeune saison	female chorus, piano four-hands	1882	arrangement of L 37a, not by Debussy?
Anh	–	Fugue pour le concours de fugue	4-part chorus	1882	
Anh	–	Fugue pour le concours d'essai	4-part chorus	1882	Prix de Rome Competition
51	40	Invocation: Élevez-vous, voix de mon âme	male chorus, orchestra	1883	text: Alphonse de Lamartine
Anh	–	Fugue pour le concours de fugue	4-part chorus	1883	
Anh	–	Fugue pour le concours d'essai	4-part chorus	1883	Prix de Rome Competition; incomplete, 31 bars only
60	56	Le printemps: L'aimable printemps ramène dans la plaine, cantata	soprano, tenor, baritone, 4-part chorus, orchestra	1884	text: Jules Barbier
64	59	Zuléima, Ode symphonique, cantata	chorus, orchestra	1885	text: Georges Boyer; lost; Zuléima was the 1st mvt of Ode symphonique, a projected 3-mvt cantata, but the other 2 mvts were never written
68a	61a	Le Printemps	mixed chorus, piano four-hands	1887	text: none; arrangement of L 68c
68c	–	Le Printemps, "Scenes for Chorus and Orchestra"	female chorus, orchestra	1887	text: none; manuscript lost, this orchestral version possibly never written or only sketched, but since reconstructed from other versions
69a	62a	La Damoiselle élue: La damoiselle élue s'appuyait sur la barrière d'or du ciel, oratorio	solo female voice (S), 2-part children's chorus (SS), 2-part female chorus (CC) (with contralto solo), orchestra	1887–88	text: Dante Gabriel Rossetti; revised 1902
69b	62b	La Damoiselle élue: La damoiselle élue s'appuyait sur la barrière d'or du ciel, cantata	soprano, 4-part female chorus (SSCC) (with contralto solo), piano	1906	arrangement of L 69a
–	–	Prélude à 'L'histoire de Tristan	chorus, orchestra	1907	unfinished, reconstructed by Robert Orledge 2011, premiered 2015
99	92	Chansons de Charles d'Orléans: 1. Dieu! qu'il la fait bon regarder!; 2. Quand j'ai ouy le tambourin sonner 3. Yver, vous n'estes qu'un villain	4-part mixed chorus	1898	text: Charles duc d'Orléans; revised 1908
149	141	Ode à la France: Les troupeaux vont par les champs désertés, cantata	soprano, mixed chorus, orchestra	1916–17	text: Louis Laloy; unfinished draft, completed and arranged by Marius-François Gaillard in 1928 (piano acc. version) & 1958 (orchestrated version)
=== Solo voice with orchestra ===
96	89	La Saulaie	baritone, orchestra	1896–1900	text: Dante Gabriel Rossetti
–	119b	Ballades de François Villon: 1. Ballade de Villon à s'Amye: Faulse beauté qui tant me couste cher 2. Ballade que Villon feit à la requeste de sa mère pour prier Nostre Dame: Dame du ciel, régente terrienne 3. Ballade des femmes de Paris: Quoy qu'on tient belles langagières	voice, orchestra	1910	concurrent arrangement of L 126a; texts: François Villon
=== Vocal trio with orchestra ===
35	20	Daniel: Versez, que de l'ivresse. Aux accents d'allégresse, cantata	3 voices, orchestra	1882	text: Émile Cicile
52	41	Le gladiateur: Mort aux Romains, tuez jusqu'au dernier	3 voices, orchestra	1883	text: Émile Moreau
61	57	L'enfant prodigue, scène lyrique, cantata: 1. Prélude; 2. Air "L'Année, en vain chasse l'année; Azaël, pourquoi m'as-tu quittée?" 3. Récit "Eh bien, encor des pleurs!" 4. Cortège et Air de danse 5. Récit et Air "Ces airs joyeux; O temps, à jamais effacé" 6. Récit et Air "Je m'enfuis" 7. Duo "Rouvre les yeux à la lumière" 8. Air "Mon fils est revenu; Plus de vains soucis" 9. Trio "Mon cœur renaît à l'espérance"	soprano, baritone, tenor, orchestra	1884	revised 1907–08, with additional reorchestration 1908 by André Caplet under Debussy's supervision; text: Édouard Guinand
=== Solo voice with piano ===
–	1	Ballade à la lune: C'était dans la nuit brune	voice, piano	1879	text: Alfred de Musset; lost (Note: The posthumous printing in 2003 of Lesure's 2001 revised catalog (as a supplement to the revised edition of his Debussy biography) omitted the composition Ballade à la lune without explanation. It is unknown if the work was found to be spurious or omitted by accident.)
1	2	Madrid: Madrid, princesse des Espagnes	voice, piano	1879	text: Alfred de Musset
2	4	Nuits d'étoiles: Nuit d'étoiles, sous tes voiles	voice, piano	1880	text: Théodore de Banville
3	8	Rêverie: Le zéphir à la douce haleine	voice, piano	1880	text: Théodore de Banville
6	5	Caprice: Quand je baise, pâle de fièvre	voice, piano	1880	text: Théodore de Banville
7	16	Aimons-nous et dormons: Aimons-nous et dormons, sans songer au reste du monde	voice, piano	1880	text: Théodore de Banville
9	–	Les baisers: Plus de fois, dans tes bras charmants	voice, piano	1881	text: Théodore de Banville
11	17	Rondel chinois: Sur le lac bordé d'azalée	voice, piano	1881	text: Marius Dillard
12	18	Tragédie: Les petites fleurs n'ont pu vivre	voice, piano	1881	text: Léon Valade
13	19	Jane: Je pâlis et tombe en langueur, Chanson écossaise	voice, piano	1881	text: Leconte de Lisle
15	33	La fille aux cheveux de lin: Sur la luzerne en fleur	voice, piano	1881	text: Leconte de Lisle
16	7	Fleur des blés: Le long des blés que la brise fait onduler	voice, piano	1881	text: André Girod
17	30	Rondeau: Fut-il jamais douceur de cœur pareille	voice, piano	1881	text: Alfred de Musset
18	11	Souhait: Oh! quand la mort que rien ne saurait apaiser	voice, piano	1881	text: Théodore de Banville
19	12	Triolet à Phillis "Zéphyr": Si j'étais le zéphyr ailé	voice, piano	1881	text: Théodore de Banville
21	–	Les papillons: Les papillons couleur de neige	voice, piano	1881	text: Théophile Gautier
22	46	L'archet: Elle avait de beaux cheveux blonds	voice, piano	1881	text: Charles Cros
23	48	Fleur des eaux: Non, les baisers d'amour	voice, piano	1881	text: Maurice Bouchor
24	47	Chanson triste: On entend un chant sur l'eau dans la brume	voice, piano	1881	text: Maurice Bouchor
25	–	Les Elfes: Couronnés de thym et de marjolaine	voice, piano	1881	text: Leconte de Lisle
26	21	Fantoches: Scaramouche et Pulcinella	voice, piano	1882	1st version of L 86 No.2; text: Paul Verlaine
28	13	Les roses: Lorsque le ciel de saphir	voice, piano	1882	text: Théodore de Banville
29	34	Sérénade: Las, Colombine a fermé le volet	voice, piano	1882	text: Théodore de Banville
30	15	Pierrot: Le bon Pierrot que la foule contemple	voice, piano	1882	text: Théodore de Banville
31	23	Fête galante: Voilà Sylvandre et Lycas et Myrtil	voice, piano	1882	text: Théodore de Banville
34	–	Il dort encore: Il dort encore, une main sur la lyre	voice, piano	1882	piano reduction of an aria from the opera Hymnis; text: Théodore de Banville
36	22	Le lilas: O floraison divine des lilas	voice, piano	1882	text: Théodore de Banville
38a	25a	Flôts, palmes et sables: Loin des yeux du monde	voice, piano	1882	text: Armand Renaud
38b	25b	Flôts, palmes et sables: Loin des yeux du monde	voice, piano, harp	1882	arrangement of L 38a
42	28	En sourdine: Calmes dans le demi-jour	voice, piano	1882	1st version of L 86 No.1; text: Paul Verlaine
43	29	Mandoline: Les donneurs de sérénades	voice, piano	1882	text: Paul Verlaine
44	14	Séguidille: Un jupon serré sur les hanches	voice, piano	1882	text: Théophile Gautier
45	32	Clair de lune: Votre âme est un paysage choisi	voice, piano	1882	1st version of L 86 No.3; text: Paul Verlaine
47	31	Pantomime: Pierrot qui n'a rien d'un Clitandre	voice, piano	1883	text: Paul Verlaine
50	39	Coquetterie posthume: Quand je mourrai, que l'on me mette	voice, piano	1883	text: Théophile Gautier
53	43	Romance [musique pour éventail]: Silence ineffable de l'heure	voice, piano	1883	text: Paul Bourget
54	44	Musique: La lune se levait, pure, mais plus glacée	voice, piano	1883	text: Paul Bourget
55	45	Paysage sentimental: Le ciel d'hiver si doux, si triste, si dormant	voice, piano	1883	
56	52	Romance: Voici que le printemps, ce fil léger d'avril	voice, piano	1884	text: Paul Bourget
57	53	Apparition: La lune s'attristait des séraphins	voice, piano	1884	text: Stéphane Mallarmé
58	54	La romance d'Ariel: Au long de ces montagnes douces	voice, piano	1884	text: Paul Bourget
59	55	Regret: Devant le ciel d'été, tiède et calme	voice, piano	1884	text: Paul Bourget
63a	60a	Ariettes oubliées: 1. Le vent dans la plaine suspend son haleine: C'est l'extase langoureuse 2. Il pleut doucement sur la ville: Il pleure dans mon cœur comme il pleut sur la ville 3. Le rossignol qui, du haut d'une branche: L'Ombre des arbres dans la rivière embrumée 4. Paysages belges. Chevaux de bois: Tournez, tournez, bons chevaux de bois 5. Aquarelles 1. Green: Voici des fruits, des fleurs, des feuilles 6. Aquarelles 2. Spleen: Les Roses étaient toutes rouges	voice, piano	1885–87	texts: Paul Verlaine
65	79/1	Romance: L'âme évaporée et souffrante	voice, piano	1885	text: Paul Bourget; published 1891 as No.1 of Deux Romances
66	79/2	Les cloches: Les feuilles s'ouvraient sur le bord des branches	voice, piano	1885	text: Paul Bourget; published 1891 as No.2 of Deux Romances
67	58	Barcarolle: Viens! l'heure est propice	voice, piano	1885	text: Édouard Guinand; lost
70	64	Cinq poèmes de Charles Baudelaire: 1. Le Balcon: Mère des souvenirs, maîtresse des maîtresses 2. Harmonie du soir: Voici venir les temps où vibrant sur sa tige 3. Le Jet d'eau: Tes beaux yeux sont las, pauvre amante 4. Recueillement: Sois sage, ô ma douleur 5. La Mort des amants: Nous aurons des lits pleins d'odeurs légères	voice, piano	1887–89	texts: Charles Baudelaire
73	63	Axel	voice, piano	1890	text: Auguste Villiers de l'Isle-Adam
81	74	La belle au bois dormant: Des trous à son pourpoint vermeil	voice, piano	1890	text: Vincent Hyspa
84	6	Beau soir: Lorsque au soleil couchant les rivières sont roses	voice, piano	1890–91	text: Paul Bourget
85	81	Trois mélodies de Verlaine: 1. La Mer est plus belle que les cathédrales 2. Le Son du cor s'afflige vers les bois 3. L'Échelonnement des haies moutonne à l'infini	voice, piano	1891	texts: Paul Verlaine
86	80	Fêtes galantes, Set 1: 1. En sourdine: Calmes dans le demi-jour 2. Fantoches: Scaramouche et Pulcinella; 3. Clair de lune: Votre âme est un paysage choisi	voice, piano	1891–92	texts: Paul Verlaine; 1. 2nd version of L 42; 2. 2nd version of L 26; 3. 2nd version of L 45
88	76	Les Angélus: Cloches chrétiennes pour les matines	voice, piano	1892	text: Grégoire Le Roy
90	84	Proses lyriques: 1. De rêve: La Nuit a des douceurs de femme 2. De grève: Sur la mer les crépuscules tombent 3. De fleurs: Dans l'ennui si désolément vert 4. De soir: Dimanche sur les villes	voice, piano	1892–93	texts: Debussy
97	90	Chansons de Bilitis: 1. La Flûte de Pan: Pour le jour des Hyacinthies; 2. La Chevelure: Il m'a dit "Cette nuit j'ai rêvé" 3. Le Tombeau des Naïades: Le Long du bois couvert de givre	female voice, piano	1897–98	text: Pierre Louÿs
101	94	Nuits blanches: Tout à l'heure ses mains plus délicates: 1. Nuit sans fin 2. Lorsqu'elle est entrée	voice, piano	1898	text: Debussy
107	78	Dans le jardin: Je regardais dans le jardin	voice, piano	1903	text: Paul Gravollet
–	–	Colloque sentimental	voice, piano		text: Paul Verlaine; 1st version of L 114 No.3;
114	104	Fêtes galantes, Set 2: 1. Les Ingénus: Les Hauts talons luttaient avec les longues jupes 2. Le Faune: Un Vieux faune de terre cuite 3. Colloque sentimental: Dans le vieux parc solitaire et glacé	voice, piano	1904	texts: Paul Verlaine
115	102	3 Chansons de France: 1. Rondel: Le Temps a laissé son manteau 2. La Grotte: Auprès de cette grotte sombre 3. Rondel: Pour ce que Plaisance est morte	voice, piano	1904	text: Charles duc d’Orléans
126	119a	Ballades de François Villon: 1. Ballade de Villon à s'Amye: Faulse beauté qui tant me couste cher 2. Ballade que Villon feit à la requeste de sa mère pour prier Nostre Dame: Dame du ciel, régente terrienne 3. Ballade des femmes de Paris: Quoy qu'on tient belles langagières	voice, piano	1910	texts: François Villon
129	118	Le Promenoir des deux amants: 1. Auprès de cette grotte sombre 2. Crois mon conseil, chère Climène; 3. Je tremble en voyant ton visage	voice, piano	1904–10	text: Tristan l'Hermite
135	127	Trois poèmes de Stéphane Mallarmé: 1. Soupir: Mon âme vers ton front où rêve, ô calme sœur 2. Placet futile: Princesse! À jalouser le destin d'une Hébé; 3. Éventail: Ô rêveuse pour que je plonge	voice, piano	1913	text: Stéphane Mallarmé
147	139	Noël des enfants qui n'ont plus de maison: Nous n'avons plus de maison	voice, piano	1915	text: Debussy
=== Vocal duet with piano ===
27	49	Églogue: Chanteurs mélodieux, habitants des buissons	soprano, tenor, piano	1882	text: Leconte de Lisle
41	–	Ode Bachique: À toi Lyaeos, glorieux Bacchos	soprano, tenor, piano	1882	piano reduction of a vocal duet from the opera Hymnis; text: Théodore de Banville
48	51	Diane au bois	soprano, tenor, piano	1883–84	piano reduction of a vocal duet from the opera Diane; text: Théodore de Banville; revised 1885; fragments
49	42	Chanson espagnole: Tra la la… nous venions de voir le taureau	2 voices, piano	1883	text: Alfred de Musset
