= Snowflakes Are Dancing =

Studio album by Isao Tomita
- Released: April 12, 1974
- Recorded: January 1973–March 1974
- Genres: Ambient, avant-garde, classical, proto-synthpop, space music
- Length: 41:33 (51:51 in the 2000 CD release)
- Label: RCA Red Seal
- Producer: Plasma Music

Isao Tomita chronology
Switched On Rock (1972)	Snowflakes Are Dancing (1974)	Pictures at an Exhibition (1975)

Snowflakes Are Dancing is the second studio album by Japanese musician Isao Tomita, recorded in 1973–1974 and first released by RCA Records on the Red Seal label as a Quadradisc in April 1974. The album consists entirely of Tomita's arrangements of Claude Debussy's "tone paintings", performed by Tomita on a Moog synthesizer and a Mellotron. It entered the top 50 charts in the United States, where it was nominated for four Grammy Awards in 1975, including best classical album of the year, and it was NARM's best-selling classical album of the year. In Canada, it reached number 57 in the RPM Magazine Top Albums chart.

== Overview ==
The use of the term tone paintings here describes the nature of a large portion of Debussy's work which was concerned with mood and colour, eschewing traditional tonality in favour of constructions such as the full-tonal scale, parallel chords, bitonality, and to a certain extent atonality, in order to achieve a greater degree of musical expression not allowed by strict adherence to a single key. Thus, the term tone painting is quite appropriate, in that Debussy's compositions often experimented with a much broader palette of tones, allowing each to behave similar to a colour within an illustration.

The album is considered an early example of proto-synthpop. It sparked a "revolution in synthesizer programming" which it was responsible for taking to new heights. The album's contributions to electronic music included an ambience resembling a symphony orchestra, the use of reverberation, the use of phasing and flanging to create a spatial audio effect with stereo speakers, electronic surround sound using four speakers, realistic string simulations, portamento whistles, and abstract bell-like sounds created using ring modulation. A particularly significant achievement was its polyphonic sound, which was created without the use of any polyphonic synthesizers (which were not yet commercially released). Tomita created the album's polyphonic sounds by recording selections one part at a time, taking 14 months to produce the album. The modular human whistle sounds used would also be copied in the presets of later electronic instruments.

The track "Arabesque No. 1" was used from 1976 to 2011 as the theme music for the PBS astronomy-based program Jack Horkheimer: Star Hustler (later Jack Horkheimer: Star Gazer); however, its use as the theme was discontinued when the show was revamped as Star Gazers. In Japan during the late 1970s, parts of the track "Reverie" were used for the opening and closing of Fuji Television's transmissions. The track "Clair de lune" was used during the lighting of the cauldron by torch at the opening ceremony and at the end of the 2020 Summer Olympics closing ceremony in Tokyo. for the extinguishing of the cauldron. In France, in 1983, "Arabesque No. 1" was used by France Régions 3 for its nightly programming promos.

== Track listing ==
=== Side A ===
1. "Snowflakes Are Dancing" – 2:10
2. "Reverie" – 4:44
3. "Gardens in the Rain" – 3:41
4. "Clair de lune" – 5:48
5. "Arabesque No. 1" – 3:57

=== Side B ===
1. "The Engulfed Cathedral" – 6:18
2. "Passepied" – 3:17
3. "The Girl with the Flaxen Hair" – 3:25
4. "Golliwog's Cakewalk" – 2:50
5. "Footprints in the Snow" – 4:30

=== Bonus track (2000 CD release) ===
11. "Prelude to the Afternoon of a Faun" – 10:18 (from the 1975 album Firebird)

=== Bonus tracks (2012 SACD release) ===
2. "Whistle and Chime - The Art of Sound Creation"
8. "Deux Arabesques No. 2"
13. "Nuages - Nocturnes"

At least two of these titles are slightly wrong; the title track appears to be a mistranslation back into English of an other-language (probably Japanese) version of Debussy's original title (The Snow Is Dancing), whereas "Golliwog's Cakewalk" contains the common misspelling of the name Golliwogg (Debussy was clearly and specifically referring to the Golliwogg, a popular children's character at the time). (However, the MP3 download from Amazon has the correct spelling of the latter.)

== Recording ==
The album sleeve names the musical instruments and recording hardware used by Tomita to create the work.

- Moog synthesizer
  - One 914 extended range fixed filter bank
  - Two 904-A voltage-controlled low-pass filters
  - One 904-B voltage-controlled high-pass filter
  - One 904-C filter coupler
  - One 901 Voltage-controlled oscillator
  - Three 901-A oscillator controllers
  - Nine 901-B oscillators
  - Four 911 envelope generators
  - One 911-A dual-trigger delay
  - Five 902 voltage-controlled amplifiers
  - One 912 envelope follower
  - One 984 four-channel mixer
  - One 960 sequential controller
  - Two 961 interfaces
  - One 962 sequential switch
  - Two 950 keyboard controllers
  - One 6401 Bode ring modulator
- Tape recorders
  - One Ampex MM-1100 16-track
  - One Ampex AG-440 4-track
  - One Sony TC-9040 4-track
  - One Teac A-3340S 4-track
  - One Teac 7030GSL 2-track
- Mixers
  - Two Sony MX-16 8-channel mixers
  - Two Sony MX-12 6-channel mixers
- Accessories
  - One AKG BX20E Echo unit
  - One Eventide Clockworks "Instant Phaser"
  - Two Binson Echorec "2" units
  - One Fender "Dimension IV"
  - One Mellotron

== See also ==
- 1974 in Japanese music
