= Rhapsodie for saxophone and orchestra =

Concertante work for saxophone and orchestra by Claude Debussy

Rhapsodie
- by Claude Debussy
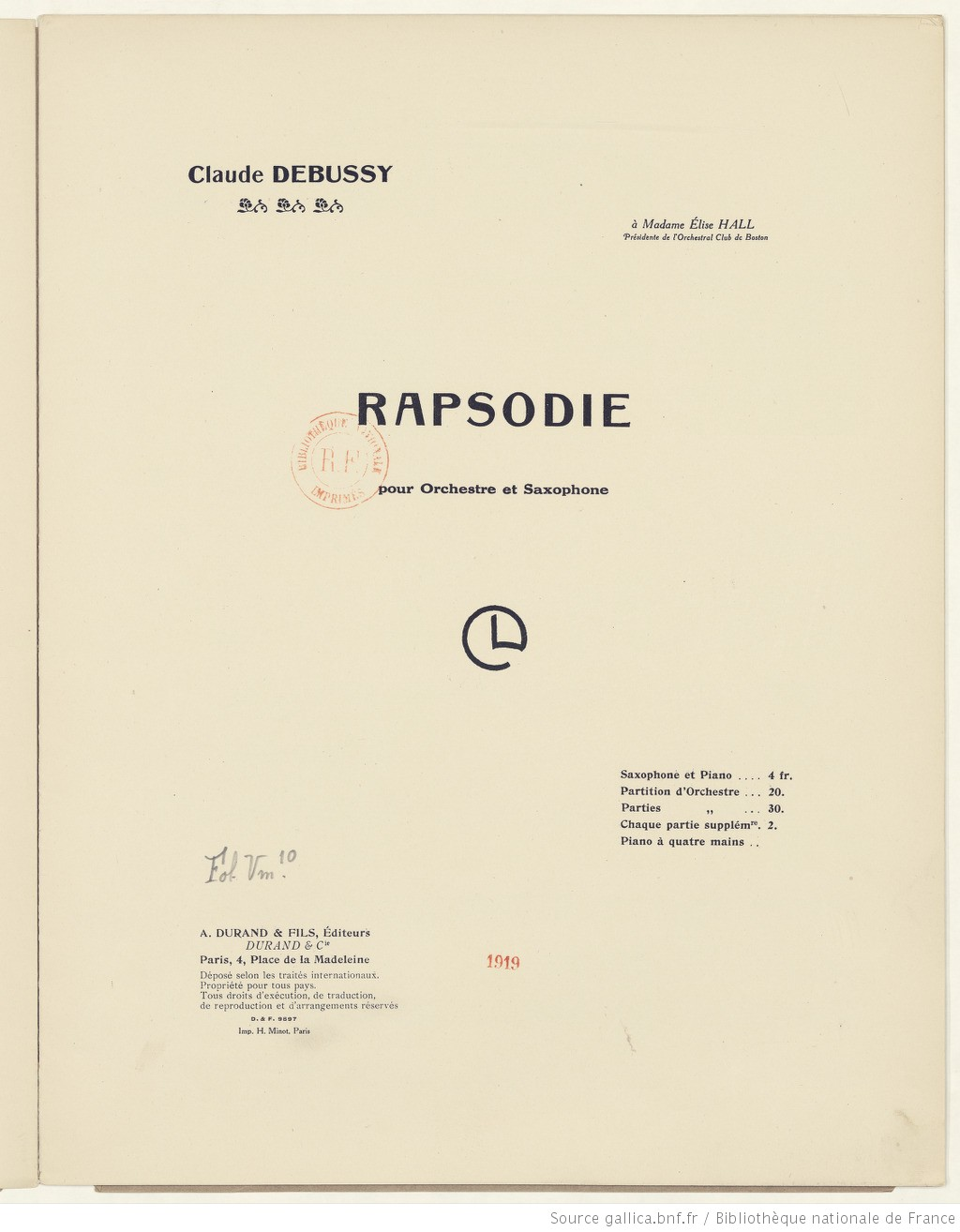
- First edition cover page
- Native name: Rapsodie pour orchestre et saxophone
- Other name: Rhapsodie mauresque, Rhapsodie orientale
- Catalogue: L. 98
- Composed: 1901-1911, Orchestrated 1919
- Dedication: Elise Hall
- Scoring: alto saxophone; accompaniment

Premiere
- Date: 14 May 1919
- Location: Paris, France
- Conductor: André Caplet
- Performers: Pierre Mayeur (alto saxophone)

Rhapsodie for saxophone and orchestra, L.98, also known as Rhapsodie mauresque or Rhapsodie orientale, is a piece for alto saxophone and accompaniment by Claude Debussy. Completed in solo and piano form in 1911, the piece is most well known through its 1919 orchestration of the accompaniment by Jean Roger-Ducasse.

== History ==
Commissioning a number of composers such as André Caplet and Vincent d'Indy, in 1901 American saxophonist Elise Hall had requested Debussy to compose a piece for the saxophone. During the process of composition, Debussy is noted to have not looked favorably upon the abilities of either Hall nor the saxophone, and did not work on the commission for months. After a number of visits by Hall to Paris, Debussy had given her a score of Pelléas et Mélisande and continued working on Rhapsodie. Debussy had finished the piece's sketches in 1908, but had resumed and completed the saxophone and piano score in 1911, eventually sending the score off to Hall.

After Debussy's death in 1918, Jean Roger-Ducasse orchestrated the piano accompaniment for a full orchestra in 1919. Rhapsodie eventually premiered on May 14, 1919, at the Salle Gaveau by the Société nationale de musique, conducted by André Caplet. Rather than Elise Hall, who at the time of the premier had become entirely deaf, Pierre Mayeur had played the solo saxophone part during the first performance.

Boston Symphony performances on 12-13 February 1932 featured the orchestra's Louis Speyer playing the solo part on English horn. The 11-12 November 1939 performances by Sigurd Rascher with the New York Philharmonic were of a "revised version by [conductor] Ernest Ansermet," where "Ansermet in revising the score has allotted to the saxophone some passages given by Roger-Ducasse to other wind instruments."

== Instrumentation ==
Jean Roger-Ducasse's orchestration calls for:

- Solo alto saxophone
- 3 flutes (one doubling piccolo), 2 oboes, cor anglais, 2 clarinets, 2 bassoons
- 4 horns, 2 trumpets, 3 trombones, tuba
- Timpani, triangle, tambourine, cymbals
- Harp
- strings

The 1939 New York Philharmonic performance gives the same instrumentation for Ernest Ansermet's revised version.
