= La boîte à joujoux =

1919 ballet by Claude Debussy

La Boîte à joujoux
- by Claude Debussy
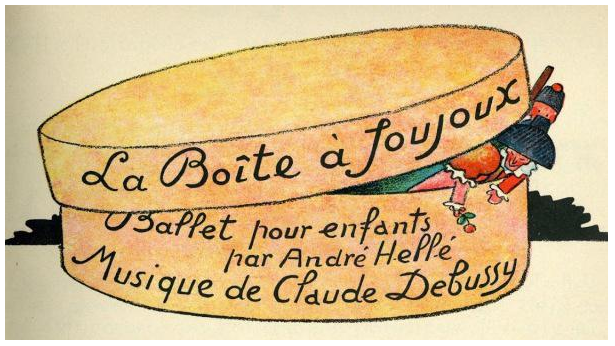
- Cover music sheet of La Boîte à joujoux designed and written by André Hellé, 1913.
- English: The Toy-box
- Catalogue: L. 128
- Genre: Impressionism
- Composed: 1913
- Performed: December 10, 1919; 105 years ago Théâtre du Vaudeville, Paris
- Published: 1913, Éditions Durand

La boîte à joujoux (The Toy-Box) is a ballet score by Claude Debussy. The composer completed the work as a piano score, but he died before he was able to orchestrate it. A successful orchestration was done by André Caplet.

In 1913, Debussy was approached by the artist and writer André Hellé, who had devised a ballet scenario from his children’s tale La boîte à joujoux. A children's theme appealed to Debussy, who was devoted to his own young daughter, Emma-Claude (known as "Chouchou"), and had already written his suite Children's Corner for her. He originally envisaged a puppet show, but he changed his mind about this.

Debussy composed the piano score, but the outbreak of the First World War caused the ballet to be postponed, and it was not staged until 1919, after the composer's death.

The work, which plays for about half an hour, is in seven sections:

1. Prelude: Le sommeil de la boite (The toy-box asleep)
2. Tableau 1: Le magasin de jouets (The toy shop)
3. Valse: Danse de la poupée (The doll's waltz)
4. Tableau 2: Le champ de bataille (The field of battle)
5. Tableau 3: La bergerie a vendre (The sheepfold for sale)
6. Tableau 4: Apres fortune faite (After making a fortune)
7. Epilogue

Of the toys in Hellé's box there are three principals, to each of whom Debussy gives a little leitmotiv: a toy soldier, a pretty doll, and a foolish and quarrelsome polichinelle. The soldier falls in love with the doll, but the polichinelle will not give her up. There is a fierce battle, and the soldier is wounded by the polichinelle, who then renounces the doll. She nurses the soldier, falls in love with him, and they marry and live happily ever after.
