= Henri Büsser =

French composer, organist, and conductor (1872–1973)

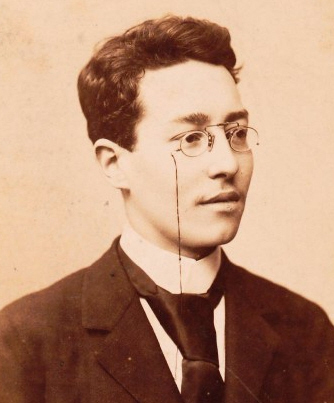
Büsser photographed by Auguste Leroux (1895)

Paul Henri Büsser (16 January 1872 – 30 December 1973) was a French classical composer, organist, conductor and teacher. Among his teachers were César Franck, Charles Gounod and Jules Massenet. In addition to his own compositions Büsser edited and orchestrated a wide range of music – mostly but not exclusively French – dating from the 17th to the 20th centuries. He was at various times in his career the conductor of the Paris Opéra and the Opéra-Comique, and professor of composition at the Conservatoire de Paris.

== Life and career ==
Büsser was born in Toulouse of partly German ancestry. He was the son of an organist, Fritz Büsser (1846–1879), and sang as a boy in the choir of Toulouse Cathedral under Aloÿs Kunc before entering the École Niedermeyer de Paris in 1885 to study with Alexandre Georges. He entered the Conservatoire de Paris in 1889, studying organ with César Franck and composition with Ernest Guiraud, Charles Gounod and Jules Massenet. He took the second prize in the 1892 Prix de Rome competition. In that year, through the influence of Gounod, he was appointed organist of Saint-Cloud, near Paris, a post he held for 30 years.

In 1900 Büsser was appointed conductor at the Théâtre du Château-d'Eau in Paris. In 1902 he directed the off-stage chorus at the premiere of Claude Debussy's Pelléas et Mélisande at the Opéra-Comique, and took over the remaining performances when the original conductor, André Messager, stepped down after the third performance to meet other contractual commitments. Debussy was at first less impressed by Büsser's conducting than by Messager's, but Büsser soon mastered the work and the composer inscribed a score of the opera to him "with the grateful friendship of Claude Debussy". He later asked Büsser to orchestrate his Petite Suite.

In 1904 he began teaching at the Conservatoire, and in 1905 he succeeded Paul Taffanel as conductor at the Opéra. He reconstructed Adolphe Adam's original 1841 ballet score for a 1924 revival of Giselle at the Opéra. In 1931 he was promoted to professor of composition at the Conservatoire. Among his students were Tomojirō Ikenouchi, Henri Dutilleux, Jean-Michel Damase, Rolande Falcinelli, Denise Roger, and a Prix de Rome winner, Henri Challan. He was elected to the Académie des Beaux-Arts in 1938 in succession to Gabriel Pierné. From 1939 he was director of the Opéra-Comique, a post from which he was dismissed in 1941 during the Nazi occupation because of derogatory remarks he was alleged to have made about Richard Wagner, although his own music clearly reflected Wagner's influence.

Büsser edited and arranged a considerable amount of music. In 1913 he contributed to the final volume of the complete edition of the works of Jean-Philippe Rameau. In the 1950s he edited the music of Les Indes galantes by Rameau, and Oberon by Carl Maria von Weber, described by The New York Times as two of the major stagings at the Paris Opéra in the postwar years. The breadth of his musical sympathies and his concern for historical as well as modern music were reflected in the title of his memoirs, De Pelléas aux Indes galantes (1955). His arrangements include many of works by French composers, such as Lully as well as Rameau, and later ones including Berlioz, Franck, Bizet and Fauré, as well as works by Mozart, Schubert and Verdi.

According to Grove's Dictionary of Music and Musicians, Büsser's music for the concert hall is "firmly rooted in the French 19th-century tradition" of Gounod and Saint-Saëns, but in his best known music, written for the theatre, Wagner's influence is strong, as, to a lesser degree, is that of Debussy.

Late in his life Büsser was made a Grand Officier of the Légion d'honneur. At the age of 86 he married a retired opera singer, Yvonne Gall. He died in Paris just short of his 102nd birthday.

== Works ==
=== Opera ===
- Hélène, before 1890, incomplete
- Les Accordailles, 1890, unperformed
- Jane Grey, 1891
- Les Marivaudages, 1891, unperformed
- Daphnis et Chloé, 1897
- Le Miracle de perles, 1898, unperformed
- Blanc et noir, 1900
- Colomba, 1921
- Les Noces corinthiennes, 1922
- La Pie borgne, 1927
- Rhapsodie arménienne, 1930
- Le Carrosse du Saint-Sacrement, 1948
- Roxelane, 1948
- Diafoirus 60, 1963
- La Vénus d'ille, 1964

=== Ballet ===
- La Ronde des saisons , 1905 (Paris Opera, choreography by Joseph Hansen)

=== Incidental music ===
- Appassionato, 1910
- Les Trois sultanes, 1923
- Manon, 1925
- Histoire de France, 1929

=== Chamber music ===
- Petite suite for flute and piano, Op. 12
- Pièce for trombone and piano, Op. 33
- Appassionato for viola and piano, Op. 34, 1910
- Prelude et scherzo for flute and piano, Op. 35
- Morceau de concert (Concert Piece in D) for horn and piano, Op. 39
- Variations for trumpet in C or Bb (or cornet) and piano, Op. 53, c. 1914 (Concours du Conservatoire National de Musique Paris)
- Églogue for oboe and piano, Op. 63 (Concours du Conservatoire National de Musique de Paris)
- Cantecor for horn and piano, Op. 77
- Catalane sur des airs populaires for viola and orchestra or piano, Op. 78, 1926
- Rhapsodie arménienne for viola and piano, Op. 81, 1930
- Andalucia sur des thèmes andalous for flute and piano, Op. 86 (Concours du Conservatoire National de Musique Paris)
- Aragon sur des airs populaires d' Espagne for clarinet and piano, Op. 91, c. 1934
- La Chasse de Saint Hubert for horn and piano, Op. 99, c. 1937

== Writings ==
- De Pelléas aux Indes galantes—De la flûte au tambour (memoires), 1955

== Sources ==
- Büsser, Henri (1955). De Pelléas aux Indes galantes. Paris: Fayard. OCLC 1121687678.
- Dietschy, Marcel (1990). A Portrait of Claude Debussy. Oxford and New York: Oxford University Press. ISBN 978-0-19-315469-8.
- Nichols, Roger; Richard Langham Smith (1999). Claude Debussy : Pelléas et Mélisande. Cambridge: Cambridge University Press. ISBN 978-0-521-30714-7.
