= The Little Nigar =

Piano piece by Claude Debussy

- Cake Walk
- Piano music by Claude Debussy
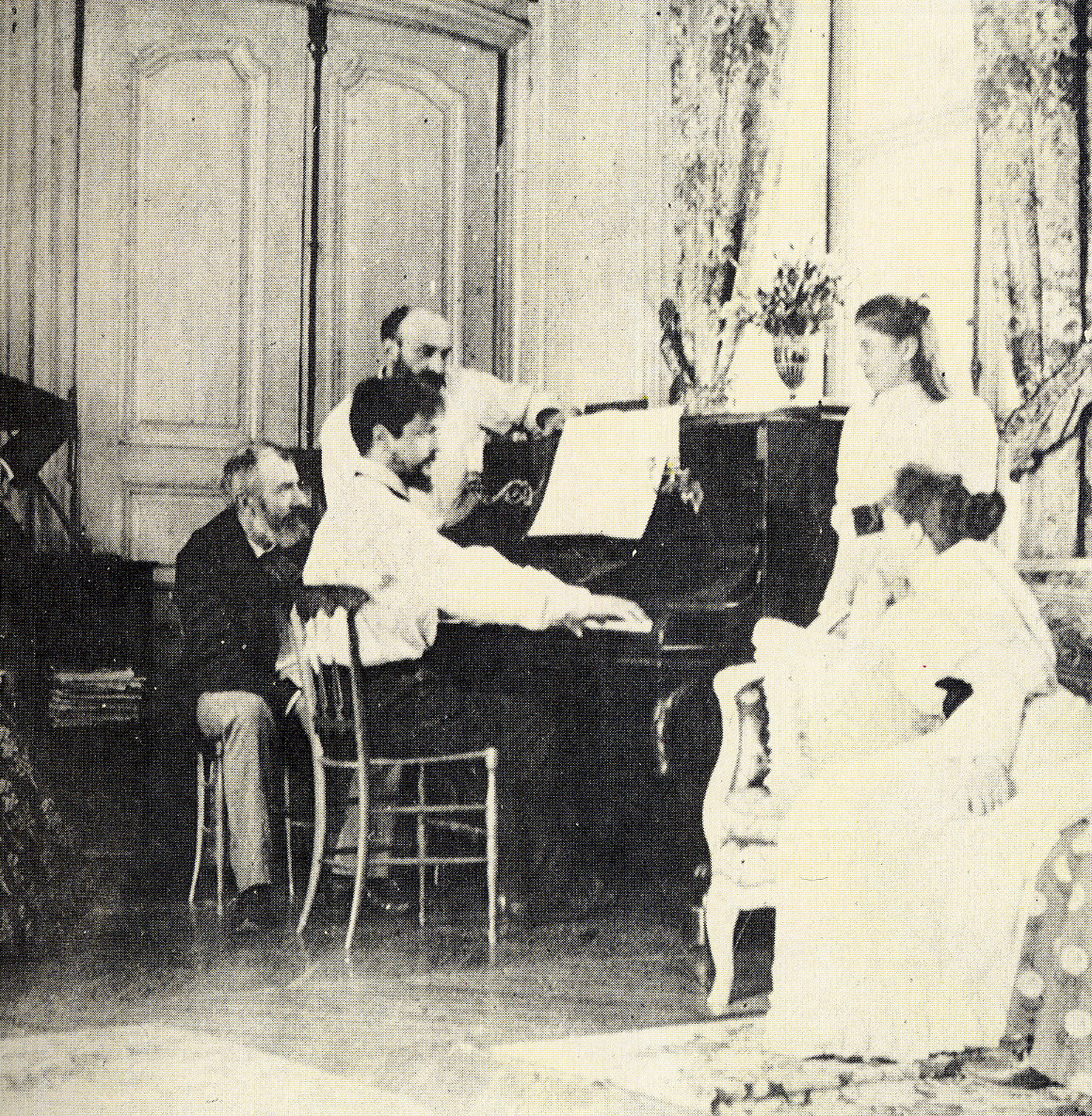
- Debussy at the piano in 1893
- Other name: The Little Negro / Le petit nègre
- Key: C major
- Catalogue: CD 122; L. 114
- Composed: 1909?
- Published: 1909; c. 1934

Le Petit Negre
Arranged by Anne DeBlois, Performed by the Advent Chamber Orchestra, Advent Concert November 2007. (1:49)

The Little Nigar (CD 122, L. 114) is the original title by composer Claude Debussy for a short piece for piano, composed in 1909 for a piano method and published the same year. It was later also published as a single piece, entitled The Little Negro and Le petit nègre. In more recent times, the piece has also been published under the title Le petit noir (The Little Black).

== History ==
Debussy composed The Little Nigar (giving the noun this spelling) in 1909 on a commission from Théodore Lack, for his piano method Méthode de Piano. The subtitle describes it as a cakewalk. It is reminiscent of Golliwogg's Cakewalk from his Children's Corner, a piano suite that he had composed a year earlier.

Debussy regularly sought exotic influences. In The Little Nigar, he alluded to banjo chords and drums, influenced by American minstrel shows. The piece, marked allegro, begins with a first theme presenting "jazzy" syncopes in 2/4 time, in the then popular ragtime style. It is followed by a lyrical passage, marked espressivo and pianissimo (very softly), which leads to a return of the first section. The first theme leans towards pentatonic and is accompanied by a chromatic sequence of broken minor thirds.

The Little Nigar was first published in 1909 by Éditions Alphonse Leduc in Paris as part of Lack's piano method and again as a single piece in about 1934, now with an added repetition and entitled The Little Negro, with subtitle Le petit nègre.

Debussy also used the piece's main theme in his 1913 ballet for children, La boîte à joujoux, in which it characterises an English soldier.

Numerous transcriptions have been made of the piece, including an arrangement for woodwinds that has been used for advertising Purina One dog food.

== Literature ==
- Schmitz, E. Robert (1950). The Piano Works of Claude Debussy, foreword by Virgil Thomson. New York: Duell, Sloan & Pearce.
