= La plus que lente =

Work for solo piano by Claude Debussy

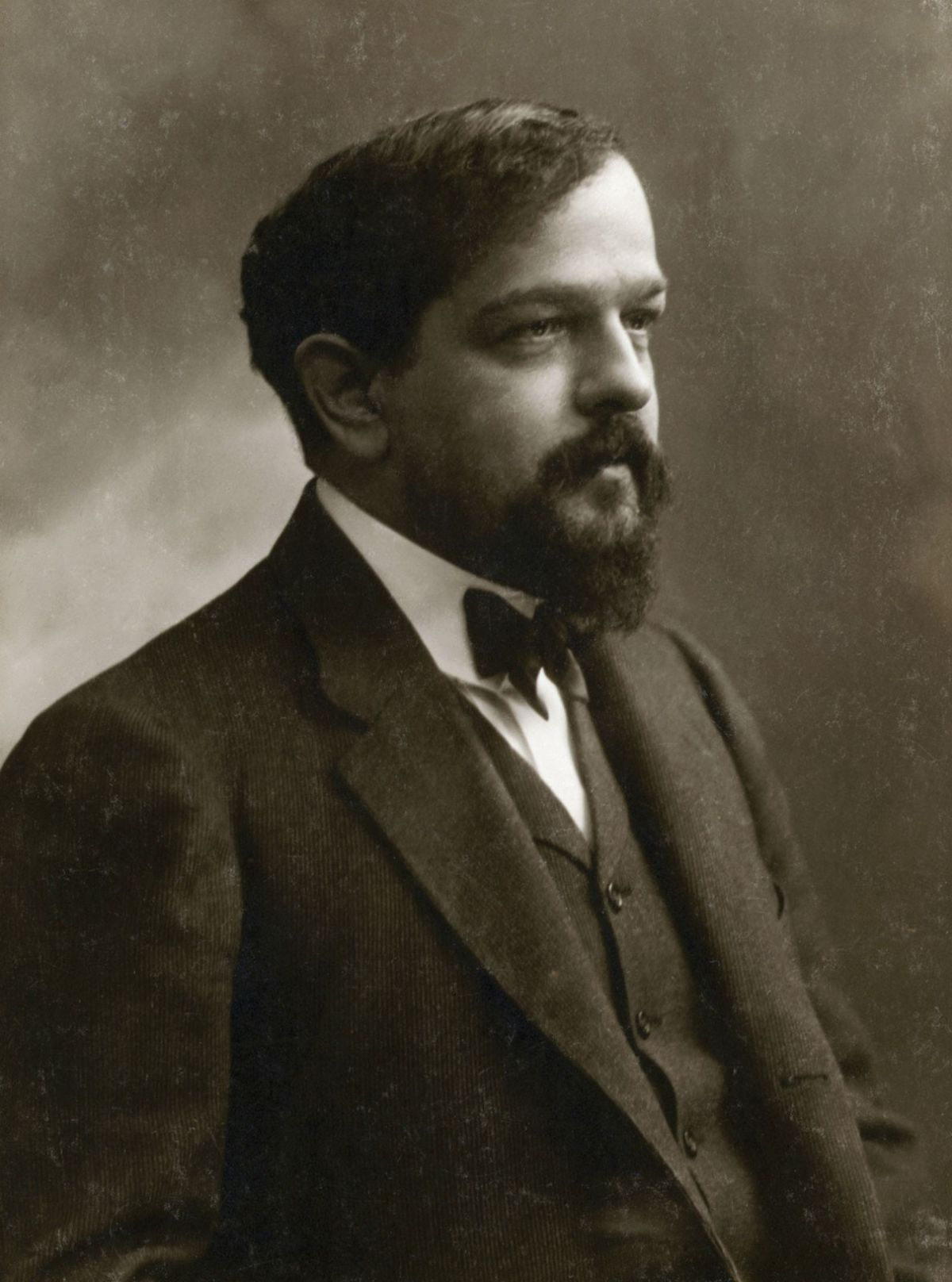
Claude Debussy ca. 1908

La plus que lente, L. 121 (French pronunciation: [laplyskəˈlɑ̃t], "The more than slow"), is a waltz for solo piano written by Claude Debussy in 1910, shortly after his publication of the Préludes, Book I. The piece debuted at the New Carlton Hotel in Paris, where it was transcribed for strings and performed by the popular 'gipsy' violinist, Léoni, for whom Debussy wrote it (and who was given the manuscript by the composer).

Debussy arranged the piece for small orchestra (flute, clarinet, piano, cimbalom and strings) which was published in 1912.

== Style ==
La plus que lente (original)
Solo piano version, March 2009

La plus que lente (arrangement for strings)
An arrangement for strings performed by the Advent Chamber Orchestra in November 2007

Despite its title, La plus que lente was not meant to be played slowly; "lente," in this context, refers to the valse lente genre that Debussy attempted to emulate. Typical of Debussy's caustic approach to naming his compositions, it represented his reaction to the vast influence of the slow waltz in France's social atmospheres. However, as Frank Howes noted, "La plus que lente is, in Debussy's wryly humorous way, the valse lente [slow waltz] to outdo all others."

The work is marked "Molto rubato con morbidezza," indicating Debussy's encouragement of a flexible tempo.

== History ==
It has been claimed that Debussy was supposedly inspired for La plus que lente by a small sculpture, "La Valse", that he kept on his mantelpiece. However, others point to various sources of inspiration, some citing the resemblance between this waltz and Debussy's earlier work, Ballade.

During the same year of its composition, an orchestration of the work was conceived, but Debussy opposed the score's heavy use of percussion and proposed a new one, writing to his publisher:

Examining the brassy score of La plus que lente, it appears to me to be uselessly ornamented with trombones, kettle drums, triangles, etc., and thus it addresses itself to a sort of de luxe saloon that I am accustomed to ignore!—there are certain clumsinesses that one can easily avoid! So I permitted myself to try another kind of arrangement which seems more practical. And it is impossible to begin the same way in a saloon as in a salon. There absolutely must be a few preparatory measures. But let's not limit ourselves to beer parlors. Let's think of the numberless five-o'-clock teas where assemble the beautiful audiences I've dreamed of.

— Claude Debussy, 25 August 1910

== See also ==
- List of compositions by Claude Debussy by genre
- List of compositions by Claude Debussy by Lesure numbers
- Impressionist music
- Romantic music
