= Yvonne Gall =

French operatic soprano

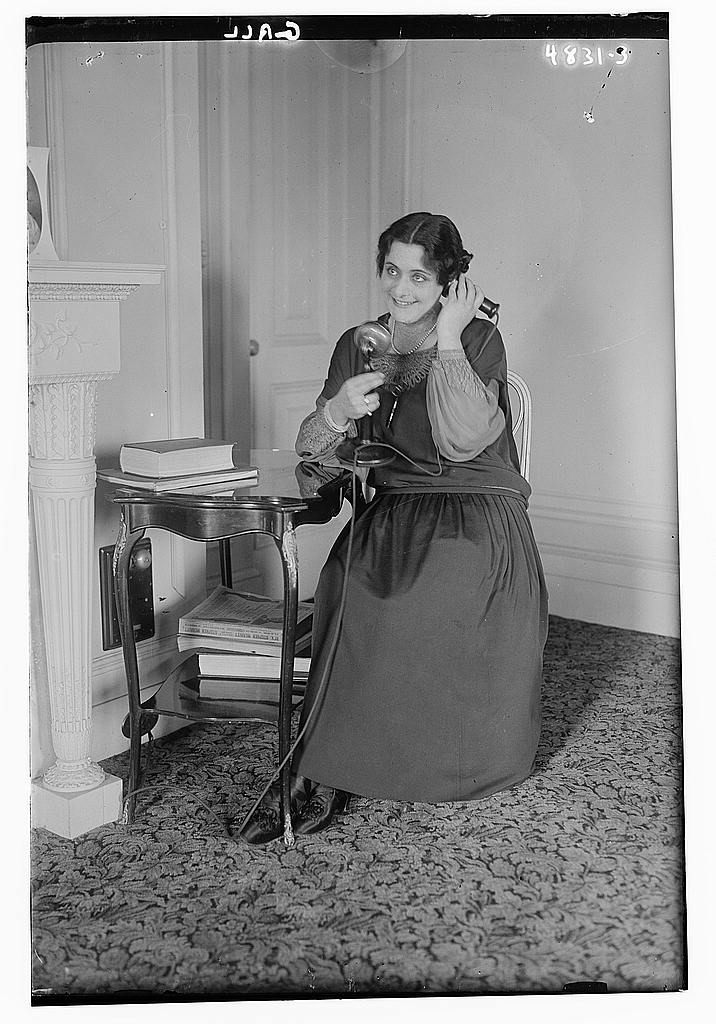
Yvonne Gall in 1919

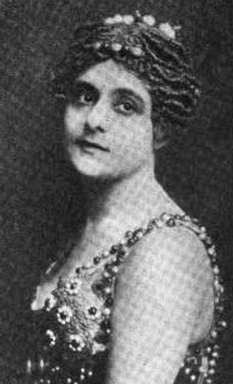
Yvonne Gall, from a 1919 publication.

Yvonne Gall (6 March 1885 – 21 August 1972) was a French operatic lyric soprano.

== Biography ==
Gall was born on 6 March 1885 in Paris.

She trained at the Conservatoire de Paris and made her debut in 1908 at the Paris Opéra under André Messager as Woglinde in the Paris premiere of Götterdämmerung. She went on to specialize in French lyric roles, particularly Marguerite, Manon, and Thaïs, though she also sang some dramatic roles such as Tosca, Elsa, and eventually Isolde.

She sang in the premieres of Raoul Gunsbourg's operas Le vieil aigle (1909), Le cantique des cantiques (1922) and Lysistrata (1923), and the American premiere of Ravel's L'heure espagnole.

She was married to the conductor Henri Büsser.

She died on 21 August 1972 in Paris.

== Recordings ==
Gall took part in one of the first complete opera recordings made by Pathé under François Ruhlmann with the chorus of the Opéra-Comique: Roméo et Juliette (Gounod) (1912). This was remastered by Ward Marston for VAI CDs in 1994.

== Sources ==
- Steane, J B (1992), 'Gall, Yvonne' in The New Grove Dictionary of Opera, ed. Stanley Sadie (London) ISBN 0-333-73432-7
