= Petite Suite (Debussy) =

Suite for piano (4 hands)

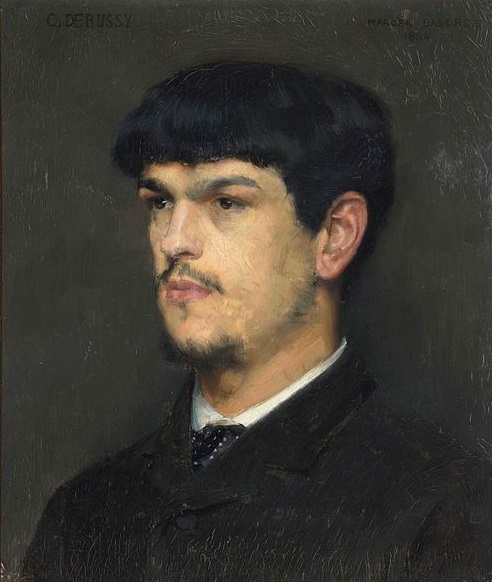
Debussy by Marcel Baschet, 1884

The Petite Suite, L 65, is a suite for piano four hands by Claude Debussy. It has been transcribed many times, most notably in an orchestral version by Debussy's colleague Henri Büsser.

The suite, which was composed from 1886 to 1889, was first performed on 2 February 1889 by Debussy and pianist-publisher Jacques Durand at a salon in Paris. It may have been written due to a request (possibly from Durand) for a piece that would be accessible to skilled amateurs, as its simplicity is in stark contrast with the modernist works that Debussy was writing at the time.

== Structure ==
III. Menuet
Performed on piano and saxophone by the Wasei Dúo

The work, which lasts about 13 minutes in performance, has four movements:

1. En bateau (Sailing): Andantino
2. Cortège (Retinue): Moderato
3. Menuet: Moderato
4. Ballet: Allegro giusto

The first two movements are inspired by poems from the volume Fêtes galantes by Paul Verlaine (1844–1896).

== Transcriptions ==
The Petite Suite was orchestrated by Debussy's colleague Henri Büsser in 1907, and published by A. Durand & Fils. Büsser's transcription calls for two flutes (second doubling piccolo), two oboes (second doubling cor anglais), two clarinets, two bassoons, two horns, two trumpets, timpani, percussion (cymbals, tambourine and triangle), harp, and strings. The work has also been transcribed for clarinets, for harp, for brass band, and for chamber wind ensemble.

== Recordings ==
The Petite Suite has been recorded by Massimiliano Damerini and Marco Repetti, and by Louis Lortie and Hélène Mercier.

A 2013 recording by Martha Argerich and Cristina Marton was described by critics as "outstanding," "lively and characterful," and "delightful, affectionate, limpid." Dominy Clements wrote that "their collaboration here is an object lesson in expressive unity, the lightness and melodic appeal of Debussy’s four brief movements played without pretension but with the utmost attractiveness."
