= Masques (Debussy) =

Solo piano piece by Claude Debussy

Masques
Performance in 2016 by Eunmi Ko, live at Museum of Romanticism (Madrid)

Masques, L. 105, is a piece for solo piano by Claude Debussy. Composed in July 1904, it was premiered on 18 February 1905 by Ricardo Viñes at the Salle Pleyel in Paris. Its sombre character reflects Debussy's difficult separation from Lilly Texier, his first wife. The title refers to the commedia dell'arte, although Debussy confided to Marguerite Long that the piece was "not Italian comedy, but an expression of the tragedy of existence" (French: ce n'est pas la comédie italienne, mais l'expression tragique de l'existence.)

== Structure ==
- Très vif et fantasque (6/8) – Cédez un peu (in G-flat major) – Tempo I

== See also ==
- List of compositions by Claude Debussy
