= Trois Chansons (Debussy) =

Musical work by Claude Debussy

- Choral music by Claude Debussy
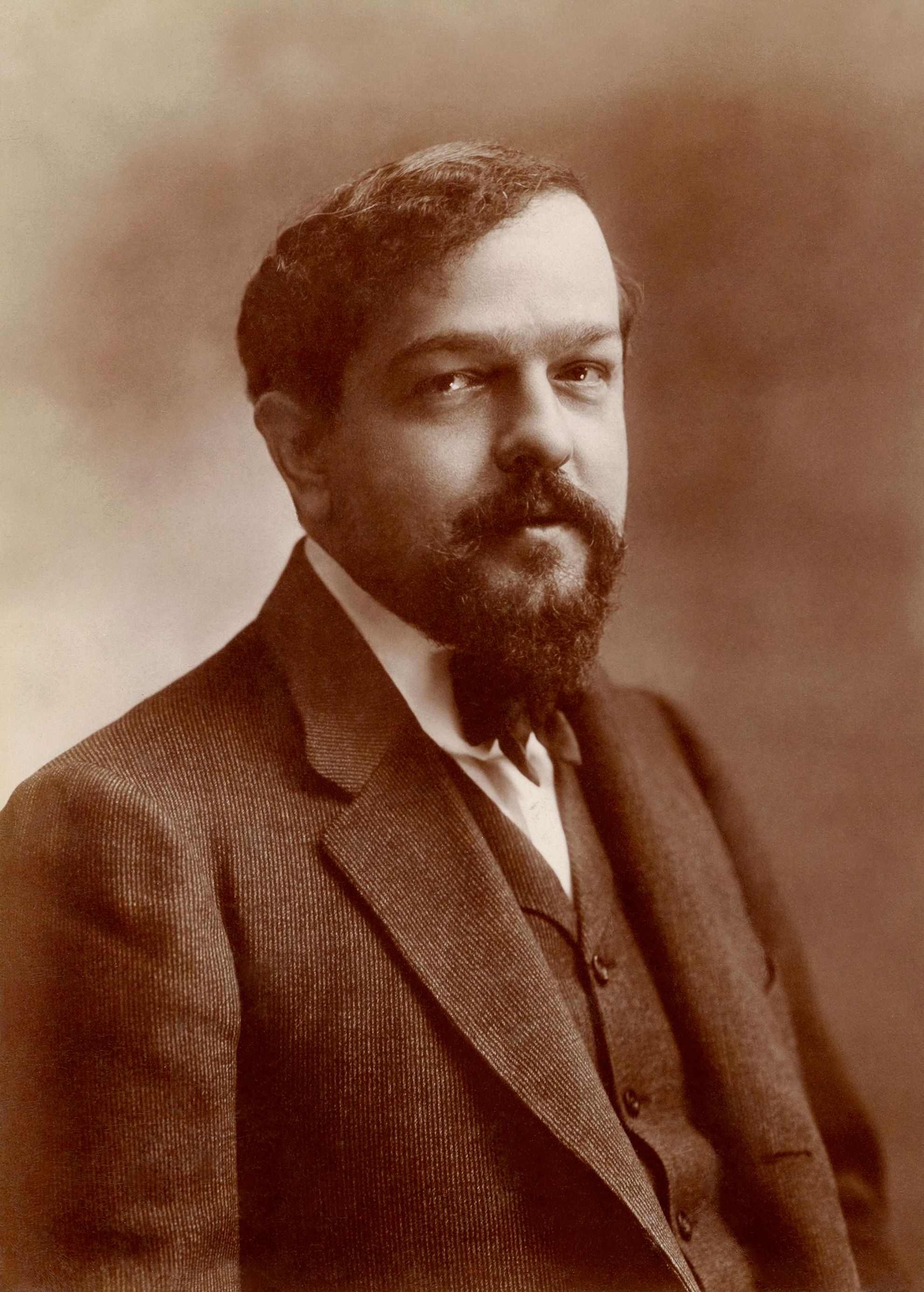
- The composer, c. 1900
- English: Three songs
- Catalogue: L 99 (92)
- Text: Poems by Charles, Duke of Orléans
- Composed: 1898, 1908
- Performed: 11 March 1909
- Published: 1909
- Scoring: A cappella choir

Trois Chansons (French for "Three Songs"), or Chansons de Charles d’Orléans, L 99 (92), is an a cappella choir composition by Claude Debussy set to the medieval poetry of Charles, Duke of Orléans (1394–1465). Debussy wrote the first and third songs in 1898 and finished the second in 1908. He premiered the piece in 1909 and Trois Chansons is his only composition for unaccompanied choir.

== History ==
Using the poetry of medieval poet Charles, Duke of Orléans, the first and third songs were revised from an earlier version composed in 1898 for a choir belonging to his friend Lucien Fontaine. He finished the second song in 1908 and the completed Trois Chansons was published by Auguste Durand the same year. The first performance was in March 1909 with eight singers from the Engel-Bathori choir. The following month, he conducted the piece at Concerts Colonne along with his composition La Damoiselle élue. Dying nine years after the premiere of Trois Chansons, it is his only composition for unaccompanied choir.

== Texts and music ==
All songs are scored for a four-part unaccompanied mixed chorus, except for "Quand j'ai ouy le tambourin sonner", which is set for alto soloist and alto-tenor-bass. His choice of Renaissance song techniques and use of romantic texts from the past was a neoclassical trend at the time of composition. The Renaissance devices he integrated into this twentieth-century composition includes the modality and equal-voice polyphony. Each piece is in ternary form, the beginning of each is repeated at the end and features Debussy's signature use of non-functional dominant seventh chords and half-diminished seventh chords (functioning as an incomplete dominant ninth).

The poetry is set in ballade form, consisting of three or four stanzas and a refrain. There is an unchanging meter and equal number of syllables in each piece. Thematically, the poems are unrelated.

=== I. Dieu! qu'il la fait bon regarder! ===
"Dieu qu'il la fait bon regarder" (God, how good it is to behold her)

The key signature features five sharps, normally indicating a B major or G♯ minor scale. However, due to Debussy's oscillating harmonies between F♯ major and C♯ minor, the music is in neither key. Debussy asserts the tonic is F♯ and the minor dominant is C♯, with the Mixolydian mode beginning on F♯. In the poem, a lover expresses his adoration of his mistress. The mistress is revealed to be France itself, as Charles d'Orléans was imprisoned for 25 years in England and created this poem as an ode to his native country.

=== II. Quand j'ai ouy le tambourin sonner ===
"Quant jai ouy le tambourin" (When I played the tambourine)
All performed by the MIT Chamber Chorus, William Cutter conducting

The key is F♯ minor with the dominant chords inflections being largely based on an Aeolian mode. The tempo gives the feeling of a romantic dance piece. The alto soloist is singing about how they would "rather stay warm in bed while everyone else is out enjoying May-time celebrations" while the other three voices mimic the percussion sound of a tambourin. The speaker in the poem is presumably male, so there is a mystery in the differences of the published edition assigning the solo to a contralto, whereas the manuscript designates it for tenor. This is the only movement of the set that deviates from SATB voicing; it is set for alto soloist and ATB choir (with divisi).

=== III. Yver, vous n'estes qu'un villain ===
The key signature is E minor. The poem (Winter, you're just a villain) is a denunciation of winter's harsh cold. The piece opens in biting, staccato E minor, decrying Winter. There follows a pastoral interlude in the parallel major about the warmth and gentleness of Summer (featuring a solo SATB quartet interspersed with the full-choir texture). Winter then returns ("but you, Winter, you exude snow, wind, rain and hail") with harsh chromaticism (hovering around the key of F♯ minor), and eventually we hear the original theme reprised in its original key.
