= Rêverie (Debussy) =

1890 composition for piano by Claude Debussy

- by Claude Debussy
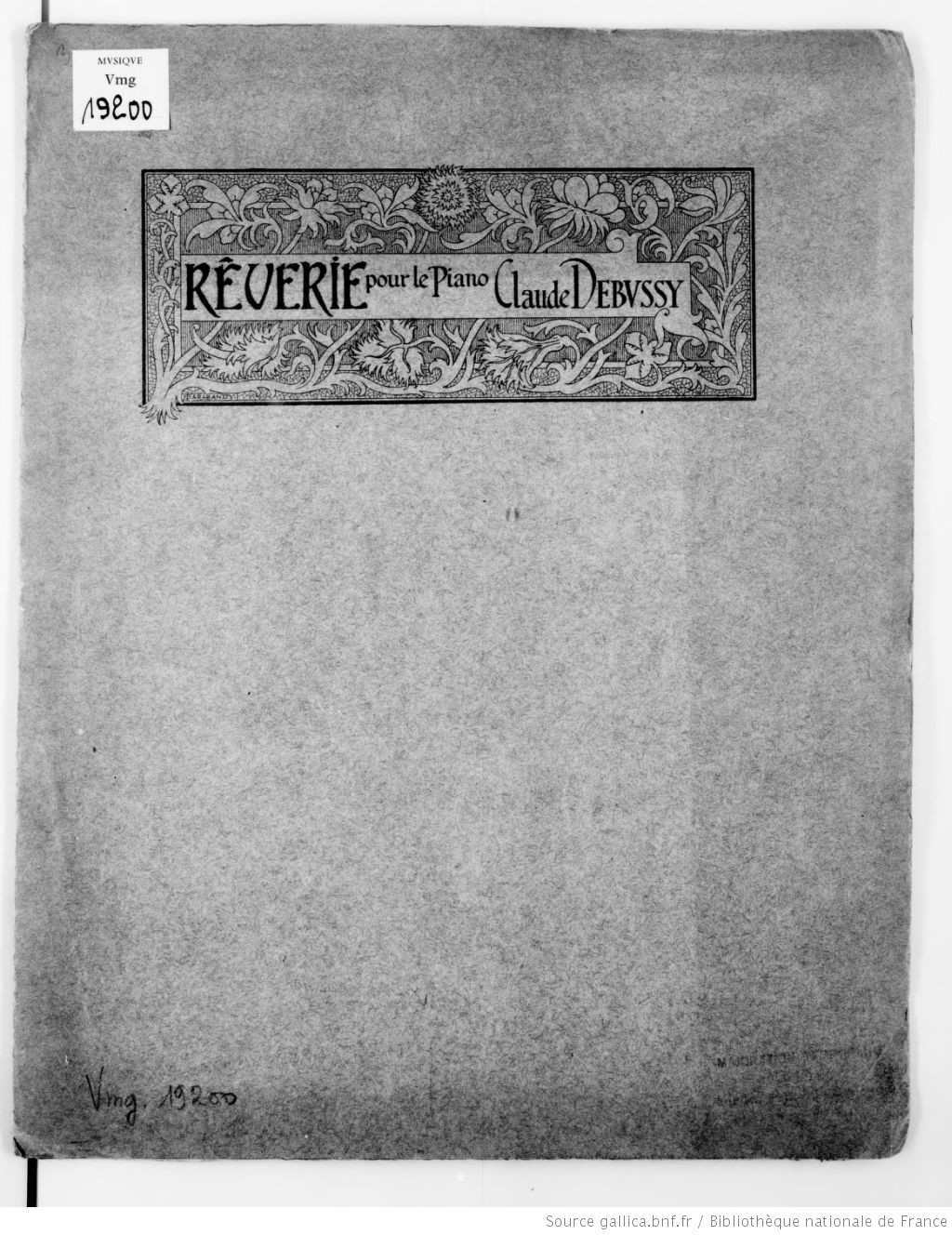
- Cover of the score, E. Fromont edition (1905)
- Key: F major
- Catalogue: L 76 (68)
- Composed: 1890
- Performed: 1899

"Rêverie"
Arranged for soprano saxophone and piano, David Hernando Vitores

Rêverie is a musical composition for piano by Claude Debussy, written in 1890.

== Overview ==
"Rêverie" was composed in 1890. The work was published by Éditions Choudens in 1891 and appeared in the music supplement of L'Illustration (no. 2751) on 16 November 1895, then at Fromont in 1905.

Debussy was critical of the piece, writing in a letter to Madame Fromont in 1905, Vous avez tort de faire paraître la "Rêverie"... C'était une chose sans importance faite très vite pour rendre service à Hartmann ; en deux mots : c'est mauvais (You are wrong to publish "Rêverie"... It was a thing of no importance, made very quickly to do Hartmann a service; in two words: it's bad).

The piece is famous, however, and has been transcribed many times, notably for violin and piano by Alberto Bachmann (Fromont 1912), for piano four hands by Henri Woollett (Fromont, 1913), and for cello and piano by Ferdinando Ronchini (Fromont, 1914) among others.

The first known public performance was given on 27 February 1899 by the pianist Germaine Alexandre.

== Analysis ==
Harry Halbreich described Rêverie as very pleasant sounding piece with a somewhat simple but certain melodic charm.

The piece carries the number L 76 (68) in the catalogue of works by Debussy by the musicologist François Lesure.

== In popular culture ==
The song "My Reverie" by Larry Clinton adapts the melody of Debussy's Rêverie.

Isao Tomita includes a synthesized version of Rêverie among other pieces by Debussy in his album Snowflakes are Dancing. In Japan during the late 1970s, this version of Rêverie was used for the opening and closing of Fuji Television's transmissions.

An arrangement of the piece by Ramin Djawadi also plays a central part in the first season of Westworld.
