= Théodore Lack =

French pianist and composer

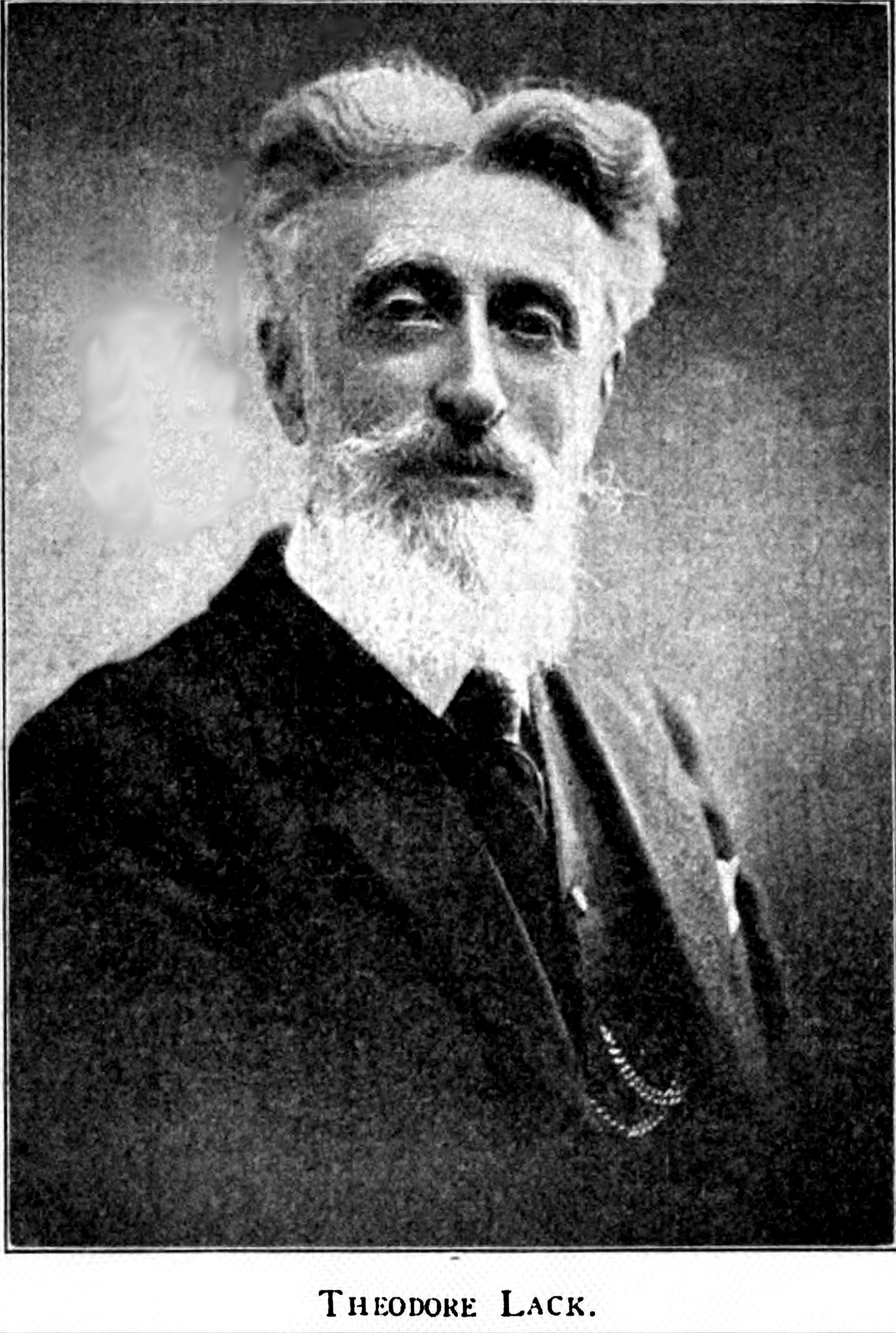
Théodore Lack c. 1910

Théodore Lack (3 September 1846 – 25 November 1921) was a French pianist and composer.

== Life ==
Born in Quimper, he studied under Antoine François Marmontel (pianoforte), Lefébure-Wély (composition) and François Bazin (harmony). He started teaching piano in Paris in 1863 and achieved acclaim as a piano pedagogue.

A very precocious boy, he was appointed organist in his native town at the age of 10 and held this post until he entered the Paris Conservatory in 1860. He graduated in 1864 as winner of many prizes.

The same year he was appointed teacher of pianoforte at the Conservatory. He published a piano method, for which he won Claude Debussy to contribute a piece, The Little Nigar. He never left Paris after his admission to the Conservatory. From 1875 to 1905 he was a member of the committee on admission and of the jury of examinations. In 1881 he became an "Officier de l'Académie". He was known as representing "the finest of salon music".
He published in 1916 Les classiques favoris du piano. This collection contains several volumes. The first is intended for beginners and contains 50 songs of various composers.

Early in his career he wrote several compositions featuring, or using as accompaniment, a now-obscure instrument called the pyrophone, and apparently was the only composer to specifically write for it.

He died in Paris.

== Selected works ==
=== Piano music ===
- Tarentelle, Op. 20
- Boléro, Op. 27
- Études élégantes, Op. 30
- Valse espagnole, Op. 40
- Scènes enfantines, Op. 61
- Études de Mlle. Didi, Op. 85
- Souvenir d'Alsace, Op. 106
- Polonaise de concert
- Sonatina in F Major op. 257, no 2 lV: Finale

=== Method ===
- Méthode de Piano, Op. 269, for piano 4-hands

== book ==
- Les classiques favoris du piano (1916)

  *première livre : Volume Debutants: index:
 - PETITE MARCHE – Daniel Gottlob Türk
 - AIR – Daniel Gottlob Türk
 - BERCEUSE – Daniel Gottlob Türk
 - MENUET en Do majeur 1 – Johann Wilhelm Hässler
 - GAVOTTE – Georg Philipp Telemann
 - MENUET en Do majeur – Johann Christian Bach
 - MENUET en Do majeur – Johann Georg Leopold Mozart
 - GIGUE – Johann Georg Witthauer
 - BADINERIE – Daniel Gottlob Türk
 - BOURRÉE – Johann Christoph Graupner
 - MENUET en Do majeur 2 – Johann Wilhelm Hässler
 - MELODIE – Robert Schumann
 - RIGAUDON – Georg Philipp Telemann
 - ALLEGRETTO – Johann Georg Witthauer
 - CONTREDANCE – Ludwig van Beethoven
 - MENUET en Do majeur – Jean-Philippe Rameau
 - RIGAUDON – William Babell
 - DE BONNE HUMEUR – Joseph Haydn
 - MENUET en Do majeures – Wolfgang Amadeus Mozart
 - MENUET en Fa majeur – Wolfgang Amadeus Mozart
 - ALLEGRO – Jean Théodore Latour
 - DANCE ALLEMANDE – Ludwig van Beethoven
 - FANFARE – William Duncombe
 - EN FREDONNANT – Robert Schumann
 - LE PETIT RIEN – François Couperin
 - AIR – Henry Purcell
 - MENUET – Georg Philipp Telemann
 - LA POUPÉE MALADE – Pyotr Ilyich Tchaikovsky
 - DANSE JOYEUX – Daniel Gottlob Türk
 - NOVELETTE – Gustav Cornelius Gurlitt
 - SONATINE – Jean Théodore Latour
 - ROMANCE – Gottlob Neefe
 - ADAGIO – Muzio Clementi
 - MENUET en La mineur – Georg Friedrich Händel
 - MENUET en Ré majeur – Wolfgang Amadeus Mozart
 - TENDRE SOUVENIR – Daniel Steibelt
 - MENUET en Ré mineur – Johann Sebastian Bach
 - BOURRÉE – George Frideric Handel
 - MENUET en La mineur – Jean-Philippe Rameau
 - BURLESQUE – Johann Georg Leopold Mozart
 - MUSETTE – Johann Sebastian Bach
 - VIEILLE CHANSON FRANÇAISE – Pyotr Ilyich Tchaikovsky
 - FINAL – Joseph Haydn
 - ECOSSAISE – Johann Wilhelm Hässler
 - MENUET en Sol majeur – Johann Sebastian Bach
 - PREMIER CHAGRIN – Robert Schumann
 - ALLEGRO – Wolfgang Amadeus Mozart
 - MENUET en Sol mineur – Johann Sebastian Bach
 - LES PLAINTES D’UNE POUPEÉ – César Franck
 - MARCHE – Johann Sebastian Bach
