= Valse romantique =

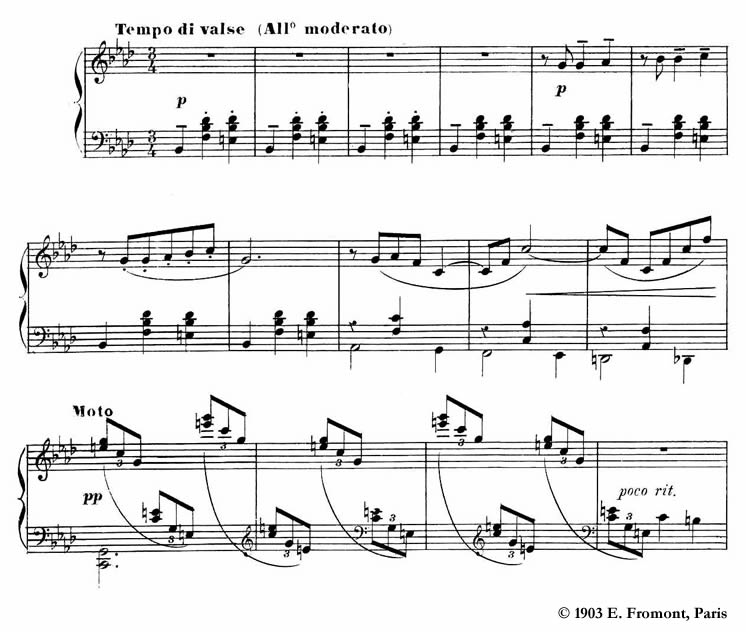
A sample of the work.

Valse romantique, L. 71, is a solo piano piece written by the French composer Claude Debussy (1862–1918) in 1890. It is in the key of F minor and starts on the tempo of "Tempo di valse (Allegro moderato)".

The piece is divided in several small parts, in a late romantic style rather than the impressionism for which he is known.
