= Reflets dans l'eau =

Piano music collection by Claude Debussy

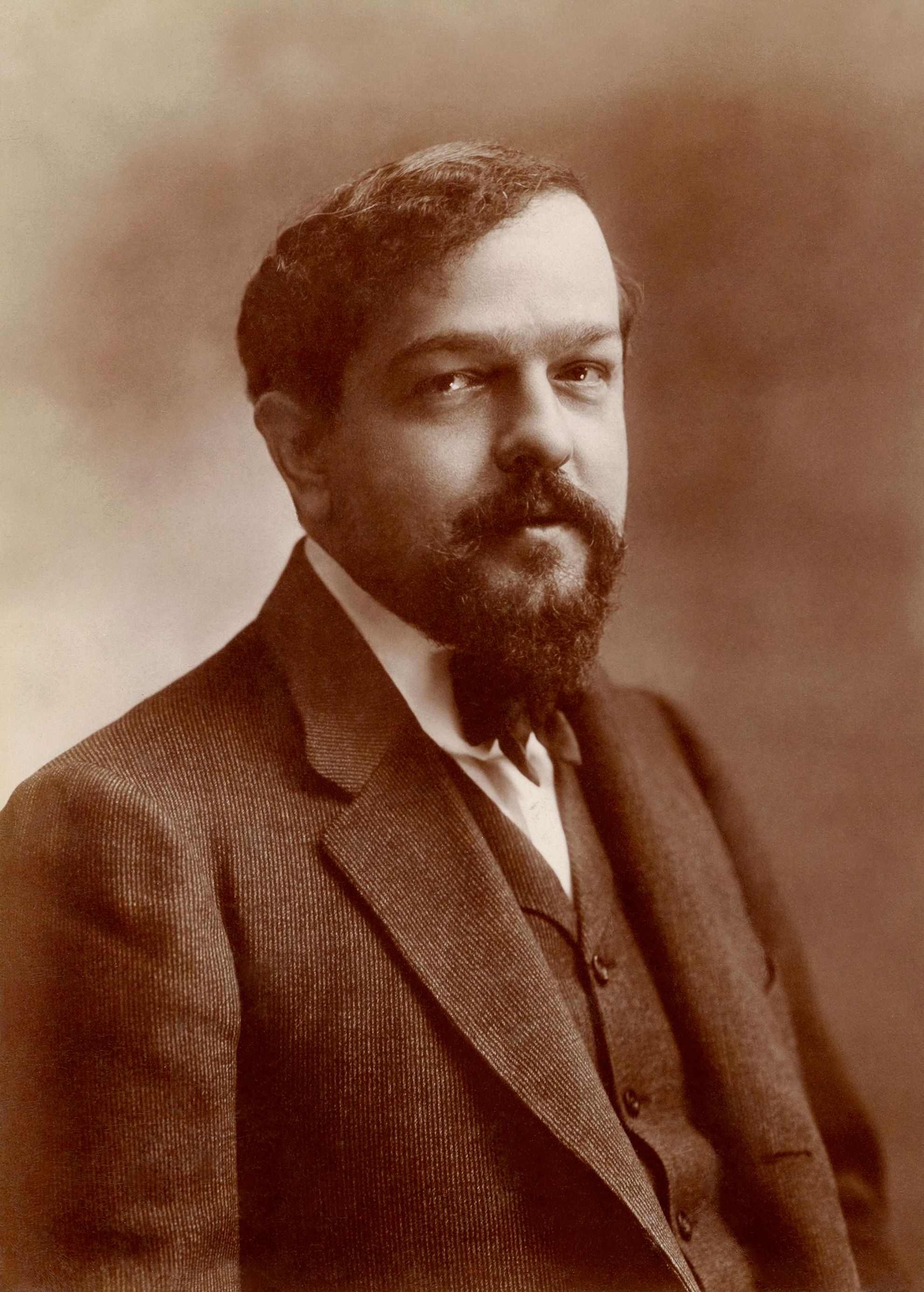
Claude Debussy c. 1900 by Atelier Nadar

Reflets dans l'eau
Performed by Giorgi Latso

Claude Debussy's Reflets dans l'eau ("Reflections in the Water") is the first of three piano pieces from his first volume of Images, which are frequently performed separately. It was written in 1905.

As with much of Debussy's work, it is referred to as Impressionistic, meaning that it expresses emotions and senses by making use of non-functional harmony and ambiguous key signatures, its tonality being mainly non-diatonic and usually having a sense of modality. It has similarities to Ravel's earlier piece Jeux d'eau. While in some ways Debussy influenced his younger contemporary, Ravel was arguably the first to adopt impressionism.

== Musical analysis ==
Reflets dans l'eau opens in a slow tempo (andantino molto) (which is repeated through much of the piece) while the right hand is playing a set of chords to accompany the melody. The piece has several brief melody statements and climaxes that are more glimpses of music than full ideas, which is typical of Debussy's middle and late piano works. Writing "images", Debussy was purposely intending not to create linear musical progression, but a sonic representation of water. Reflets dans l'eau is also an example of the new tone colors Debussy discovered for the piano in this part of his life, and although he later refined this style, it is representative of a major breakthrough in piano writing.

The golden ratio is apparent in the organization of the sections in the music as "the sequence of keys is marked out by the intervals 34, 21, 13, and 8 and the main climax sits at the phi position".

The musicologist Roy Howat has observed that the formal boundaries correspond exactly to the golden section. Trezise finds the intrinsic evidence "remarkable", but cautions that no written or reported evidence suggests that Debussy consciously sought such proportions.
