= Images (piano suite) =

Suite of six compositions for solo piano by Claude Debussy

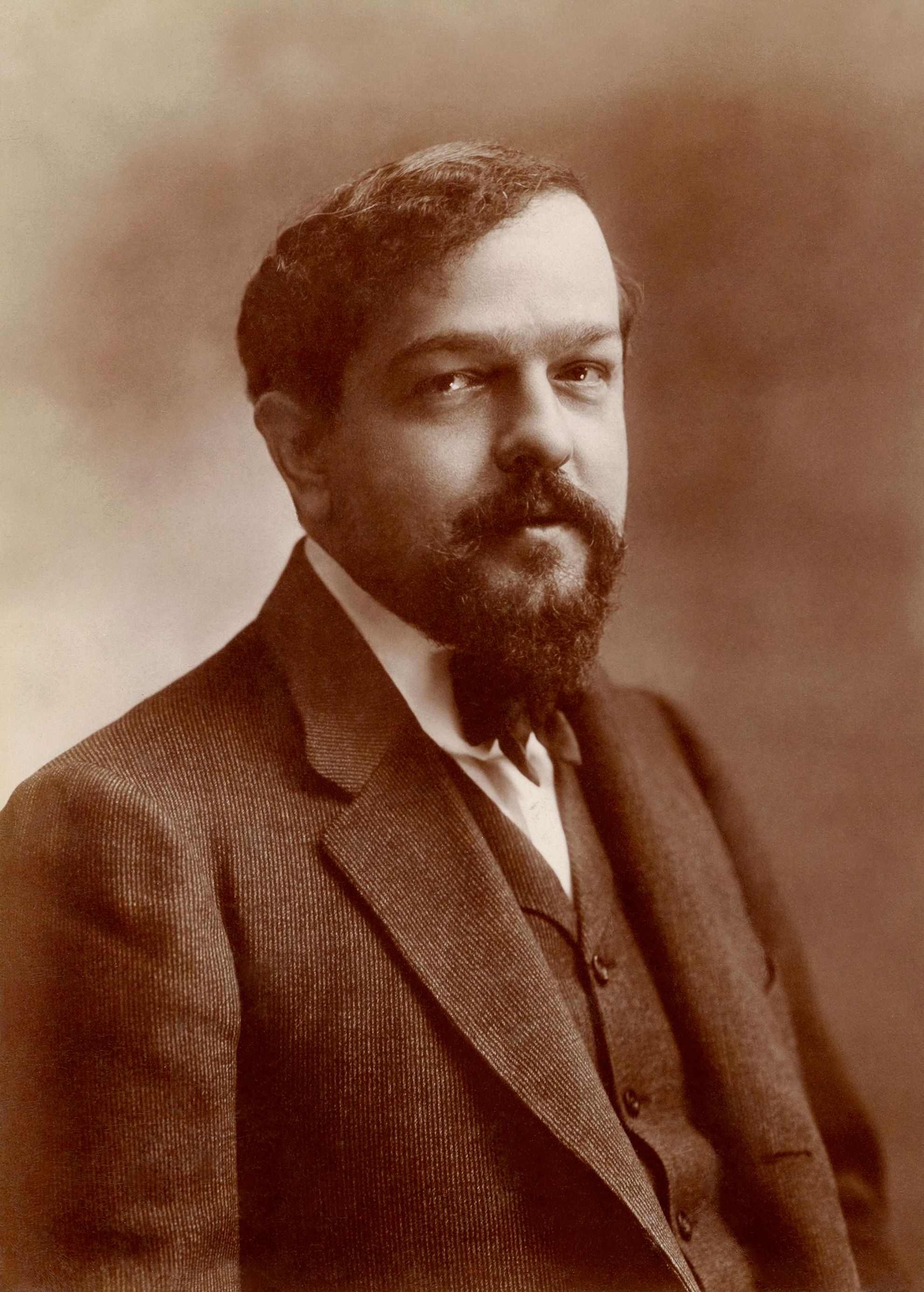
Claude Debussy c. 1900 by Nadar

Images (usually pronounced in French as [i.maʒ]) is a suite of nine compositions for solo piano by Claude Debussy. They were published in two books/series, each consisting of three pieces. These works are distinct from Debussy's Images pour orchestre. The first book was composed between 1901 and 1905, and the second book was composed in 1907. The total duration is approximately 30 minutes. With respect to the first series of Images, Debussy wrote to his publisher, Jacques Durand: "Without false pride, I feel that these three pieces hold together well, and that they will find their place in the literature of the piano ... to the left of Schumann, or to the right of Chopin... "

Debussy wrote another collection, Images oubliées (L. 87), in the winter of 1894 and dedicated it to Yvonne Lerolle, daughter of the painter Henry Lerolle. The collection remained unpublished during Debussy's lifetime, despite an announcement in the February 1896 issue of Le Grand Journal that the score was soon to be published by Fromont. Its première publication came in 1977, by Theodore Presser in Pennsylvania.

== Structure ==
1. "Reflets dans l'eau"

2. "Hommage à Rameau"
Both performed by Giorgi Latso

- Book 1 (or "1st series") (L. 110)
1. "Reflets dans l'eau" (Reflections in the water) in D♭ major
2. "Hommage à Rameau" (Tribute to Rameau) in G♯ minor
3. "Mouvement" (Movement) in C major
- Book 2 (or "2nd series") (L. 111)
1. "Cloches à travers les feuilles" (Bells through the leaves) in B whole-tone (the middle section is in E major)
2. "Et la lune descend sur le temple qui fut" (And the moon descends on the temple that was) in E minor
3. "Poissons d'or" (Golden fish) in F♯ major
- Images oubliées (L. 87)
1. "Lent (mélancolique et doux)" (Melancholic and sweet) in F♯ minor
2. "Souvenir du Louvre" in C♯ minor
3. "Quelques aspects de 'Nous n'irons plus au bois' parce qu'il fait un temps insupportable" (We will no longer go to the woods because the weather is unbearable) in D minor

No. 2 is the first version of "Sarabande" from Pour le piano (L. 95, 1901); no. 3 is an early version of "Jardins sous la pluie" from Estampes (L. 100, 1903).

== Inspirations and musical analysis ==
"Reflets dans l'eau" is one of the many pieces Debussy wrote about water; in particular, light reflecting off its surface. The piece creates an image of water being not quite still, then becoming rapid, then decreasing in motion again. "Reflets dans l'eau" is also an example of the new tone colours Debussy discovered for the piano in this part of his life, and it is considered to be one of his greatest works for the instrument. Techniques such as arpeggio, pedal-point, staccato, and glissando are used to depict moving water.

"Hommage à Rameau" is more subdued. It is a sarabande honouring the memory of Jean-Philippe Rameau.

"Mouvement" is the most abstract designation of the pieces. It is a perpetuum mobile, meaning that it is built around a continuous stream of notes.

"Cloches à travers les feuilles" was inspired by the bells in the church steeple in the village of Rahon in Jura, France. Rahon was the hometown of Louis Laloy, a close friend of Debussy and also his second biographer.

"Et la lune descend sur le temple qui fut" (And the moon descends on the temple that was) was dedicated to Laloy. The name of the piece, which evokes images of East Asia, was suggested by Laloy, a sinologist. The piece is evocative of Indonesian gamelan music, which famously influenced Debussy.

"Poissons d'or" was probably inspired by an image of a golden fish in Chinese lacquer artwork or embroidery, or on a Japanese print. Other sources suggest it may have been inspired by actual goldfish swimming in a bowl, though the French for goldfish is 'poisson rouge' (red fish).

== Recordings ==
Many famous pianists of the 20th century have recorded Debussy's Images, such as Walter Gieseking and Arturo Benedetti Michelangeli. The French musical critic Jean Roy wrote of Claudio Arrau's 1979 recording (Diapason d'Or no. 266 & 334) as being "unrivalled".

A recording by Noriko Ogawa won the Editor's Choice of Gramophone and is noted favorably by Stephen Walsh in BBC Radio 3's Building a Library series. A recording by Marc-André Hamelin is noted for its "intriguing interpretive vision".

The Images oubliées have only entered the repertoire recently, due to its postponed publication. The première recording took place in April 1979, two years after the work's first publication, performed by Scottish pianist and musicologist Roy Howat and released by Nimbus Records.

Pianists who have recorded the collection include Zoltán Kocsis, Martin Jones, Fou Ts'ong, Philippe Cassard, Aldo Ciccolini, Gordon Fergus-Thompson, Jos van Immerseel, Paul Crossley, Jean-Yves Thibaudet, François-Joël Thiollier, Michel Béroff, Jean-Pierre Armengaud, Roger Woodward, Noriko Ogawa, Jean-Efflam Bavouzet, Michael Korstick and Martino Tirimo.

In 2003, all three movements of Images oubliées were orchestrated by pianist Zoltán Kocsis, and subsequently recorded with Kocsis conducting the Hungarian National Philharmonic Orchestra, along with orchestrations of Maurice Ravel's Menuet antique and Le tombeau de Couperin.
