= Invocation (Debussy) =

Choral composition by Claude Debussy

- Choral composition by Claude Debussy
- Catalogue: CD 51; L. 40
- Text: by Alphonse de Lamartine
- Composed: 1883
- Published: 1928; 1957
- Scoring: tenor; men's choir; orchestra

Invocation (CD 51, L. 40) is a composition for men's choir and orchestra, with a solo tenor, by Claude Debussy. It is a setting of a text by Alphonse de Lamartine.

== History ==
Debussy composed Invocation in 1883, setting a text by Alphonse de Lamartine in a three-partite form for men's choir and orchestra, with a solo tenor in the middle section. A vocal score was published in 1928, and a full score in 1957.
