= Estampes =

Piano suite by Claude Debussy

- by Claude Debussy
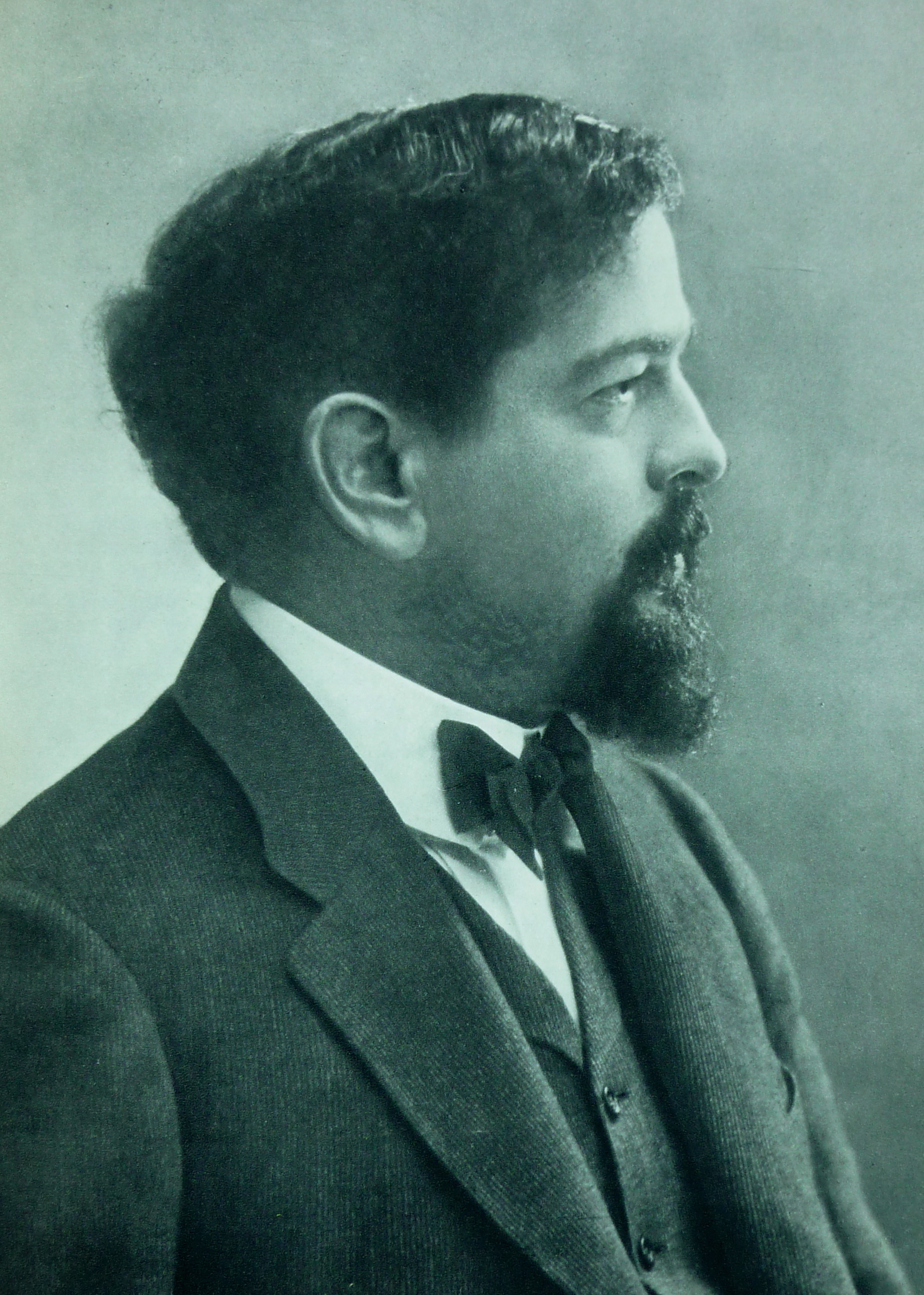
- English: Prints
- Catalogue: L. 100
- Genre: Impressionism
- Composed: 1903
- Performed: January 9, 1904; 122 years ago Salle Érard, Paris, France

Estampes (Prints), L. 100, is a composition for solo piano by Claude Debussy. Finished in 1903, the first performance of the work was given by Ricardo Viñes at the Salle Érard of the Société nationale de musique in Paris on 9 January 1904.

The suite with 3 movements is one of a number of piano works by Debussy which are often described as impressionistic, a term borrowed from painting. The style of composition had been pioneered by Ravel in Jeux d'eau, written in 1901, and was soon adopted by Debussy (for example in the earlier numbers of Images), but Debussy did not refer to himself as an impressionist.

== Music ==
Estampes consists of three movements:

1. Pagodes (Pagodas) – approx. 4–5 minutes (B major).
2. La soirée dans Grenade (Evening in Granada) – approx. 5 1/2 minutes (F♯ minor → F♯ major).
3. Jardins sous la pluie (Gardens in the Rain) – approx. 3 1/2 minutes (E minor → E major).

=== I. Pagodes ===
Pagodes evokes Indonesian gamelan music, which Debussy first heard in the Paris World Conference Exhibition of 1889. It makes extensive use of pentatonic scales and mimics traditional Indonesian melodies. Four different pentatonic scales are incorporated within the piece, further defining the imagery of the pagoda. Pagodas are Oriental temples with petite bases that give rise to ornate roofs that typically curve upwards, much like the ascending melodic line (G♯, C♯, D♯) which serves as a repeated motive through different portions of the piece.

As it is an Impressionistic work, the goal is not overt expressiveness but instead an emphasis on the wash of color presented by the texture of the work. Debussy marks in the text that Pagodes should be played presque sans nuance (nearly without nuance). Such rigidity of rhythm helps to reduce the natural inclination of pianists to add rubato and excessive expression.

=== II. La soirée dans Grenade ===
La soirée dans Grenade uses the Arabic scale and mimics guitar strumming to evoke images of Granada, Spain. At the time of its writing, Debussy's only personal experience with the country was a few hours spent in San Sebastián de los Reyes near Madrid. Despite this, the Spanish composer Manuel de Falla said of the movement: "There is not even one measure of this music borrowed from the Spanish folklore, and yet the entire composition in its most minute details, conveys admirably Spain."

=== III. Jardins sous la pluie ===
Jardins sous la pluie describes a garden in the Normandy town of Orbec during an extremely violent rainstorm. Throughout the piece, various sections evoke wind blowing, a thunderstorm raging, and raindrops falling, employing chromatic, whole tone, major and minor scales for dramatic effect. It makes use of two folk melodies, the lullaby "Dodo, l'enfant do" and "Nous n'irons plus au bois parce qu'il fait un temps insupportable" (We will no longer go to the woods because the weather is unbearable).
