= André Caplet =

French composer and conductor (1878–1925)

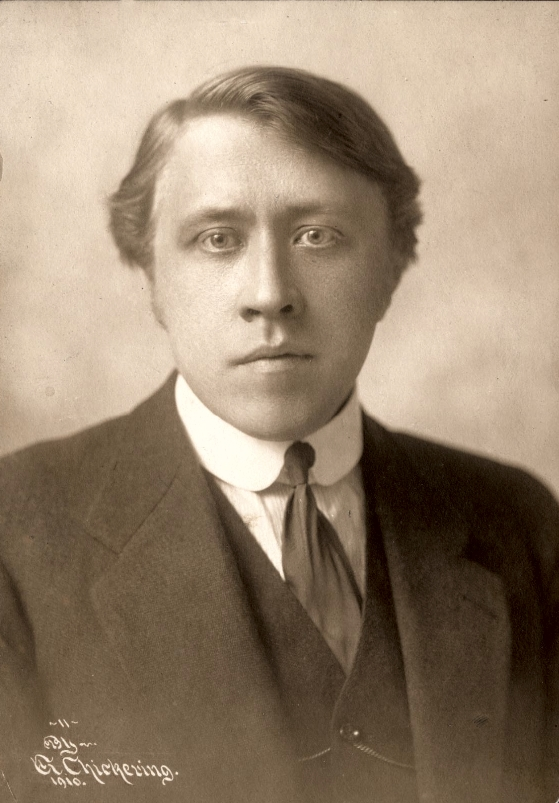
- Caplet in 1910
- Born: 23 November 1878 between Le Havre (Seine-Maritime) and Honfleur (Calvados, France
- Died: 22 April 1925 (aged 46); Neuilly-sur-Seine
- Occupation: Composer

André Léon Caplet (French pronunciation: [ɑ̃dʁe leɔ̃ kaplɛ]; 23 November 1878 – 22 April 1925) was a French composer and conductor of classical music. He was a friend of Claude Debussy who orchestrated several of his compositions, as well as arrangements of several of them for different instruments. Caplet studied at the Paris Conservatoire, where he won the Prix de Rome for his cantata Myrrha.

== Early life ==
André Caplet was born in Le Havre on 23 November 1878, the youngest of seven children born to a Norman family of modest means. He began studying piano and violin when a child and by the age of 13 performed in the orchestra of the Grand Théâtre there. He entered the Paris Conservatory in 1896 and won several prizes. While a student he supported himself first by playing in dance orchestras in the evening and then by conducting, where had immediate success. After a stint as assistant conductor of the Orchestre Colonne, in 1899 he took over the musical direction at the Théâtre de l'Odéon. Some of his student compositions were published as early as 1897. The Société des compositeurs de musique (SCM), the less avant-garde of French organizations promoting new music, (Note: The SCM was "too conventional for Debussy or Satie".) awarded his quintet for piano and winds first prize in 1901 and premiered it on 28 February of that year. Caplet soon had success with the more progressive Société nationale de musique (SCM) as well, including a concert dedicated to his work on 9 March 1901, and he was hailed in the musical press and from these performances until the end of his career his chamber works had a champion in the flutist Georges Barrère.

He won the Prix de Rome in 1901, composing in a conventional style to please the judges, while Maurice Ravel showed his contempt for the assigned text. (Note: The judges were unforgiving and Ravel never won the Prix de Rome.) Caplet's native city celebrated his participation with a performance of his Été for chorus and orchestra (1899) on 3 April 1901 and marked his victory by presenting several of his works at a concert on 24 November, including L'Été, Pâques citadines for chorus and orchestra, Feuillets d'album for flute and piano (1901), and the cantata that won him the Prix de Rome, Myrrha (1901).

Until the end of 1905, Caplet lived at the French Academy in Rome with the financial support the prize provided, though he took leave for long periods to attend performances in Berlin, Dresden, Hamburg.

== Pre-war career ==
As a composer Caplet wrote many vocal works and chamber pieces, several works for orchestra and only a handful of piano pieces. Especially interesting is his instrumental use of voices, as in his Septuor à cordes vocales et instrumentales (1909). He was also one of the first composers to incorporate the saxophone into his chamber works, like Légende (1903) and Impressions d'automne (1905). (Note: Both those works were commissioned by Elise Hall, who campaigned on behalf of the saxophone.)

Caplet served as one of the conductors of the Boston Opera Company for four seasons, from 1910 to 1914, specializing in the French repertoire. (Note: Most of the German repertoire was assigned to Felix Weingartner from 1911 to 1914.) He secured the appointment through one of its co-founders, the impresario Henry Russell, whose wife Nina became a friend of Caplet during his time in Rome. He accepted the position to enhance his reputation as a conductor and to introduce contemporary French repertoire to the United States; for example, Debussy's L'enfant prodigue, the Children's Corner, Pelléas et Mélisande, and the incidental music to Le Martyre de saint Sébastien. (Note: Other operas included Massenet's Thaïs, Werther and Manon; Offenbach's Tales of Hoffman; Bizet's Carmen; Delibes' Lakmé; Gounod's Faust; Charpentier's Louise; Raoul Laparra's Habañera; Saint-Saens' Samson et Dalila; Louis Aubert's La Forêt Bleue; Humperdinck's Hansel and Gretel; Wagner's Tristan und Isolde and Die Meistersinger. In addition to operas he led the Verdi Requiem and incidental music to stage performances: Bizet's music for Daudet's L'Arlésienne and Fauré's music for Maeterlinck's Pelléas.)

== World War I ==
At the end of 1914, after he had completed two movements of a work that became Les Prières, Caplet enlisted in the French army and saw combat in the trenches at Verdun. He was wounded in May 1915 and was later promoted to sergeant. In 1917 he completed the third movement and the work premiered that same year in the small church of Ham, Picardy, accompanied by the distant sounds of artillery. His service ended in 1919. On 4 June of that year he married Geneviève Perruchon, a general's daughter who followed his work as a composer closely. They had a son in 1920.

In 1918–19, he taught conducting, harmony, and orchestration at the music school established by Walter Damrosch at the behest of U.S. General John J. Pershing in Chaumont to train U.S. military personnel in hopes of creating military bands on the model of those found in France. (Note: One of Caplet's students there was Albert Stoessel.)

== Post-war years ==
Caplet did not return to teaching and conducting at the war's end. Instead he devoted himself to composition, including a number of religious works. His Messe à trois voix for a capella female chorus had its premiere in Sainte Chapelle on 13 June 1922. It lacks the traditional "Credo" and includes the familiar Communion motet "O salutaris hostia".

His oratorio-like Le Miroir de Jésus composed in September 1923 features a "choeur de femmes" in a supporting role. In Miroir Caplet set texts by Henri Ghéon as meditations on the fifteen decades of the rosary. The chorus announces each section's title but the female soloist delivers most of the text. The music of the central movements that take Christ's passion as their subject are, according to one commentator, "remarkable for its restraint as for its dissonance". It was a religious concert work of a sort not encountered again until Olivier Messiaen's Trois petites liturgies (1944). The British music critic Felix Aprahamian wrote that the musical textures of this work "reflect at once the polychrome tones and timbres of Debussy's art and the fourths, fifths, discant and parallel motion of the ars antiqua". Caplet conducted its premiere in February 1924 in Lyon and its Paris premiere on 1 May of that year.

== Work with Debussy ==
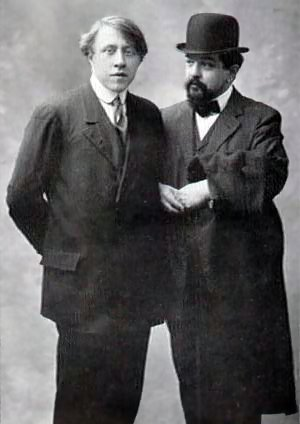
Caplet with Claude Debussy

He became a close friend of Claude Debussy, sometimes serving as translator, and he orchestrated and wrote parts for Debussy's Le Martyre de saint Sébastien. He also collaborated with Debussy in the orchestration of La boîte à joujoux. In 1911, Caplet prepared an orchestration of Debussy's Children's Corner, which, along with his orchestration of Clair de lune from the Suite bergamasque is probably the most widely performed and recorded example of his work. (Note: While it has been noted that Debussy allowed others to work on arrangements of his compositions, such efforts were undertaken while Caplet was conducting in Boston or in combat.)

While Debussy was traveling Europe seeking commissions, Caplet, "The Angel of Corrections" as Debussy called him, would complete orchestrations, make arrangements, and correct proofs. Debussy wrote often to Caplet while working on musical adaptations of The Fall of the House of Usher and The Devil in the Belfry bewailing his inability to properly compose new music. The works of Edgar Allan Poe inspired great interest in France, notably with the publication of 'The life of Edgar Allan Poe: A PsychoAnalytic Interpretation' by Marie Bonaparte (title of the English publication 1937). Caplet himself wrote two works based on 'The Masque of the Red Death', 'La masque de la mort rouge' 1908, and 'Conte fantastique' 1924, both works strongly featuring the harp.

== Death ==
In 1925, Caplet caught a cold and, given how his lungs had been weakened when he was gassed during his military service, developed pleurisy, which proved fatal. He died in Neuilly-sur-Seine (Hauts-de-Seine), a suburb of Paris, on 22 April 1925 at the age of 46. He was buried in Montmartre Cemetery.

His widow conducted many concerts of his music.

In 1926, the sculptor Jacques Zwobada, a native of Neuilly, was commissioned to create a monument to Caplet. This was one of Zwobada's earliest works after he graduated from the École des Beaux-Arts.

== Works ==
=== For voice ===
Voice and piano

- Viens! ... Une flûte invisible, (Hugo), August 1900
- Myrrha, (text by Fernand Beissier)
- Green, (Verlaine), 1902
- Il était une fois, (Richepin), January 1903
- Poème de mai (Tu nous souriais), (A. Silvestre), 1902
- Dans la fontaine, (P. Gravollet), 1903
- Papillons, (P. Gravollet), February 1903
- Le Livre rose, (P.J. Pain), 1898–1901
  1. Le livre ou je veux lire
  2. Premier prix
  3. Les pleurs de bébé
  4. Le furet du bois, mesdames
- Chanson d'automne, (A. Silvestre), 1900
- Paroles à l'absente, G. Jean-Aubry, 1908
  1. Préludes
  2. Ce sable fin et fuyant
  3. Angoise
- Les Prières, 1914–1917, (also for harp and string quartet)
  1. Oraison dominicale
  2. Salutation angélique
  3. Symbole des apôtres
- Le vieux coffret, (R. de Gourmont), 1914–1917
  1. Songe
  2. Berceuse
  3. In una selva oscura
  4. Forêt
- En regardant ces belles fleurs, (C. d'Orleans), October 1914
- Nuit d'automne, (H. de Regnier), 9 March 1915
- Prière normande, (J. Hebertot), 1916
- Solitude, (J. Ochse), 1915
- Quand reverrai-je, hélas!..., (J. du Bellay), 27 August 1916, (published by Lyra with harp accompaniment)
- La croix douloureuse, (R.P. Lacordaire), for the armed forces
- Détresse!..., (H. Charasson), 9 November 1918
- Trois Fables, (La Fontaine), 1919
  1. Le corbeau et le renard
  2. La cigale et la fourmi
  3. Le loup et l'agneau
- Le Pain quotidien, (15 exercises), 1920
- Cinq Ballades françaises, (P. Fort) 1920
  1. Cloche d'aube
  2. La ronde
  3. Notre chaumière en Yveline
  4. Songe d'une nuit d'été
  5. L'adieu en barque
- L'hymne à la naissance du matin, (reduction, P. Fort), November 1920
- La cloche felée, (C. Baudelaire), January 1922
- La mort des pauvres, (C. Baudelaire), June 1922
- Le miroir de Jésus, (reduction) (H. Gheon), Summer 1923
- La part à Dieu, (chanson populaire), 1925

Voice and organ

- Pie Jesu, March 1919
- Panis angelicus, 21 June 1919
- Pater noster, November 1919
- Tu es sacerdos, 27 July 1920
- Les prières, 1914-1917

Voice and flute

- Corbeille de fruits, (R. Tagore), September 1924
- Écoute mon coeur, 19 September 1924

Voice and harp

- Sonnet: "Doux fut le trait", (Ronsard), 8 April 1924, published by Lyra with Quand reverrai-je ...

Voice and orchestra

- Myrrha, scène lyrique, (1er Grand Prix de Rome), (F. Beissier), 1901
- Il était une fois, (J. Richepin)
- Paroles a l'absente, (G. Jean-Aubry), 1908
  1. Préludes
  2. Angoisse
- Le vieux Coffret, (R. de Gourmont)
- La croix douloureuse, (R.P. LaCordaire)
- Détresse!..., (H. Carasson)
- Hymne à la naissance du matin, (P. Fort), November 1920
- Les prières (voice, harp, string quartet) (see under voice and piano)

A cappella chorus

- Messe à trois voix, 1919-1920
  1. Kyrie eleison
  2. Gloria
  3. Sanctus
  4. Agnus Dei
  5. O Salutaris
- Inscriptions champêtres, (R. de Gourmont), August 1914

Mixed chorus and orchestra

- Été, (V. Hugo), 1899
- Paques citadines, (C. Spinelli), 1900 (published 1920)

=== Orchestral works ===
- Suite d'orchestre (sur des mélodies populaires persanes), 1900
- Légende (suite symphonique pour harpe chromatique, alto saxophone et instruments à cordes), 1905 (precursor to Conte Fantastique)
- Étude symphonique
- Le masque de la mort rouge pour harpe chromatique principale, 1908
- Marche solennelle pour le centenaire de la Villa Medicis, 1903
- Salammbô, (poème symphonique) 1902
- Marche heroïque de la Ve Division, pour musique militaire, 1917
- Epiphanie, fresque musicale pour violoncelle principal et orchestre, 1923

=== Chamber music ===
Small ensembles

- Quintette pour piano, flûte, hautbois, clarinette et basson, 1898
  1. Allegro
  2. Adagio
  3. Scherzo
  4. Finale
- Suite persane for double quintet (2 flûtes, 2 hautbois, 2 clarinettes, 2 bassons, and 2 cors), 1900, original version, also for orchestra
  1. Scharki, (allegretto)
  2. Nihavend, (andantino)
  3. Iskia Samaisi, (vivo)
- Septuor, pour quatour a cordes et 3 voix feminines, 1909
- Sonate pour piano, voix, violoncelle, 1919
- Conte fantastique or The Masque of the Red Death d'après Poe pour harpe à pedales et quatour à cordes, (published 1924)
- Le miroir de Jésus pour voix principale, 3 voix accompagnantes, quatour a cordes et harpe, (original version: Été), 1923
- Sonata da chiesa pour violon et orgue, 1924
  1. Quiet
  2. Interieur
  3. Alleluia
- Impressions d’automne – Elégie pour alto saxophone, hautbois, 2 clarinettes, basson, harpe, orgue et 2 violoncelles, 1905

Cello and piano

- Élegie, 1903
- Allegresse, 1903
- Épiphanie
- Improvisations

Flute and piano

- Rêverie et Petite valse, 1897
  - dedicated to Barrère and incorporated as Nos. 2 and 5 in Feuillets d'album
- Feuillets d'album, 1901 (Note: The three additional movements do not survive in their flute versions.)
- Viens! Une flûte invisible, 1900, voice, flute, piano

Piano, two hands

- Menuet dans le style ancien, 1897
- Deux pièces, 1900

Piano, four hands

- Prelude, 1899
- Do, Re, Mi, Fa, Sol (petites pièces faciles), 1901
- Un tas de petites choses, 1919

Harp solo

- Deux Divertissements (1. à la française, 2. à l'espagnole'), 1924, published 1925, Durand

=== Arrangements of works by Debussy ===
For various numbers of pianos and players

- Images
  1. Rondes de Printemps
  2. Gigues
  3. Ibéria
- La Mer
- Le martyre de Saint Sébastien, voix et piano
- La mer, 2 pianos, 6 hands

For orchestra

- Children's Corner (1911)
- Pagodes
- Clair de lune from Suite bergamasque
- Le martyre de Saint Sébastien, Fragments symphoniques (1911)

=== Other arrangements ===
- Chabrier's Danse villageoise for seven winds
