= Children's Corner =

1908 piano suite by Claude Debussy

- Piano suite by Claude Debussy
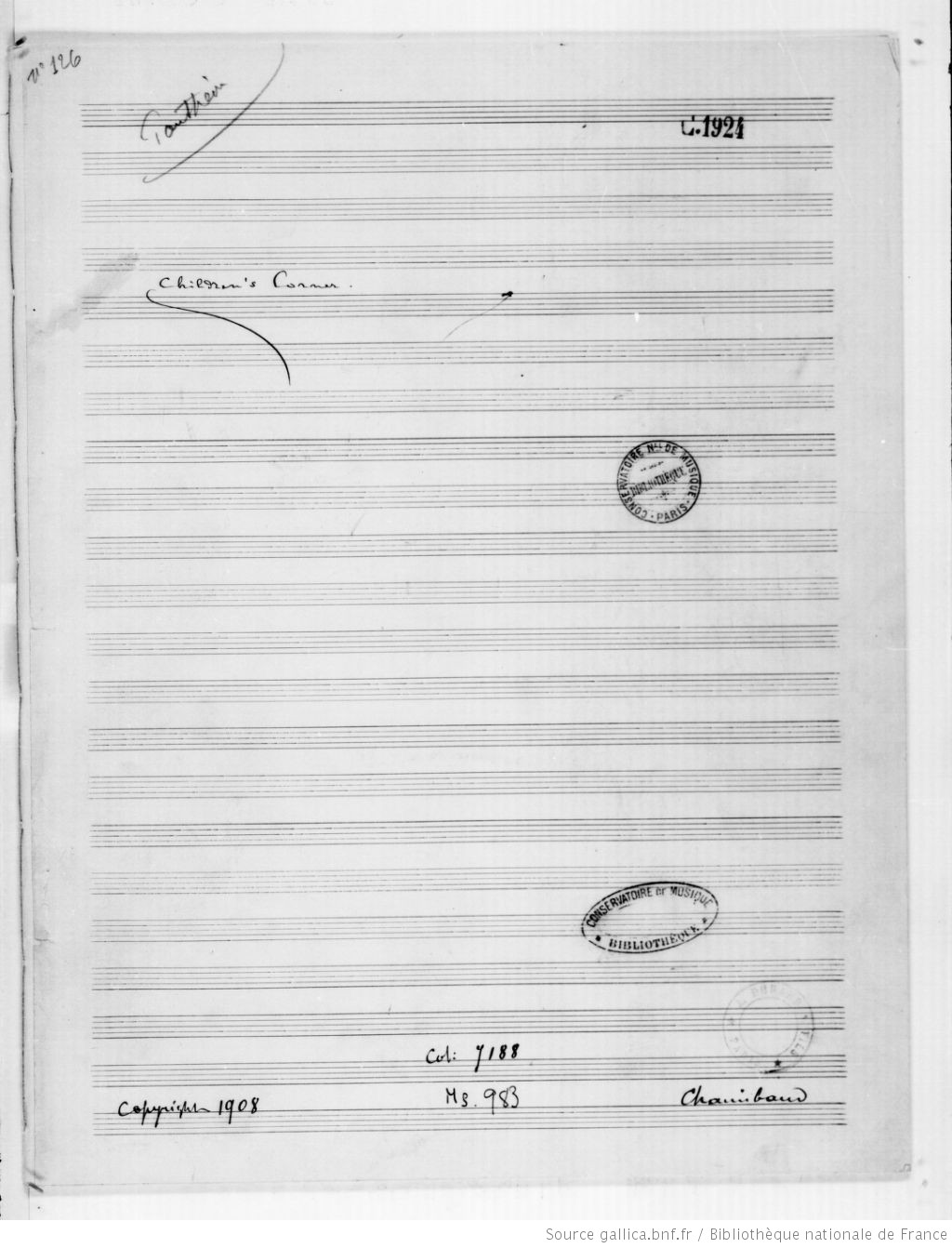
- Catalogue: L. 113
- Composed: 1906–1908
- Dedication: Claude-Emma Debussy
- Performed: 18 December 1908
- Published: July 1908
- Movements: 6

Children's Corner, L. 113, is a six-movement suite for solo piano by Claude Debussy. It was published by Durand in 1908, and was first performed by Harold Bauer in Paris on 18 December that year. In 1911, an orchestration by André Caplet was premiered and subsequently published.

== History ==
Debussy composed Children's Corner between 1906 and 1908. He dedicated the suite to his daughter, Claude-Emma (known as "Chou-Chou"), who was born on 30 October 1905 in Paris. She is described as a lively and friendly child who was adored by her father. She was three years old when he dedicated the suite to her in 1908. The dedication reads: "A ma chère petite Chouchou, avec les tendres excuses de son Père pour ce qui va suivre. C. D." (To my dear little Chouchou, with tender apologies from her father for what follows).

The suite was published by Durand in 1908, and was given its world première in Paris by Harold Bauer on 18 December that year. In 1911, an orchestration of the work by Debussy's friend André Caplet received its premiere, and was subsequently published.

Caplet's orchestration was given an American premiere on 25 March 1911 in Boston, with him conducting. The British premiere was given on 12 September 1911 at the Promenade Concerts, under the baton of Henry Wood.

== Structure ==
The suite is in six movements, each with an English-language title. This choice of language is most likely Debussy's nod towards Chou-Chou's English governess. The pieces are:

1. Doctor Gradus ad Parnassum
2. Jimbo's Lullaby
3. Serenade for the Doll
4. The Snow Is Dancing
5. The Little Shepherd
6. Golliwogg's Cakewalk

A typical performance of the suite lasts roughly 15 minutes.

=== 1. Doctor Gradus ad Parnassum ===
1. "Doctor Gradus ad Parnassum"

The title of the first movement alludes to sets of piano exercises of that name (Gradus ad Parnassum translates as "Steps to Parnassus"), several of which had been published in the eighteenth and nineteenth centuries, including one by the prolific publisher of piano exercises Carl Czerny, and Muzio Clementi. The harshness and mechanicalism is supposed to play a joke at the excessive exercises of Czerny and Clementi. This piece is a rather ingenious study in finger independence with a twentieth-century vocabulary. In the middle, the pianist slows down and tries the material in other keys for exercise. Debussy's "Doctor Gradus ad Parnassum" is of intermediate difficulty and requires the ability to play more quickly and wildly. The pianist gets more frantic toward the end and finishes the piece with a bang. Debussy told his publisher that the movement should be played "very early in the morning".

=== 2. Jimbo's Lullaby ===
2. "Jimbo's Lullaby"

This work describes an elephant, Jumbo, who came from the French Sudan and lived briefly in the Jardin des plantes in Paris around the time of Debussy's birth. The misspelling "Jimbo" betrays the Parisian accent which often confuses the pronunciation of "um" and "un" with "im" and "in". It is a beautiful lullaby with some dark moments and whole-tone passages in the middle.

=== 3. Serenade for the Doll ===
3. "Serenade for the Doll"

This piece, in triple meter, is marked Allegretto ma non troppo (moderately fast, but not too fast). Debussy instructs that the entire piece be played with the soft pedal, even in parts marked forte. The piece's title—referring to a porcelain doll—alongside its delicacy, prominent featuring of bare fifths, the pentatonic scale, and parallel fourths, mark it as an example of chinoiserie.

=== 4. The Snow Is Dancing ===
4. "The Snow Is Dancing"

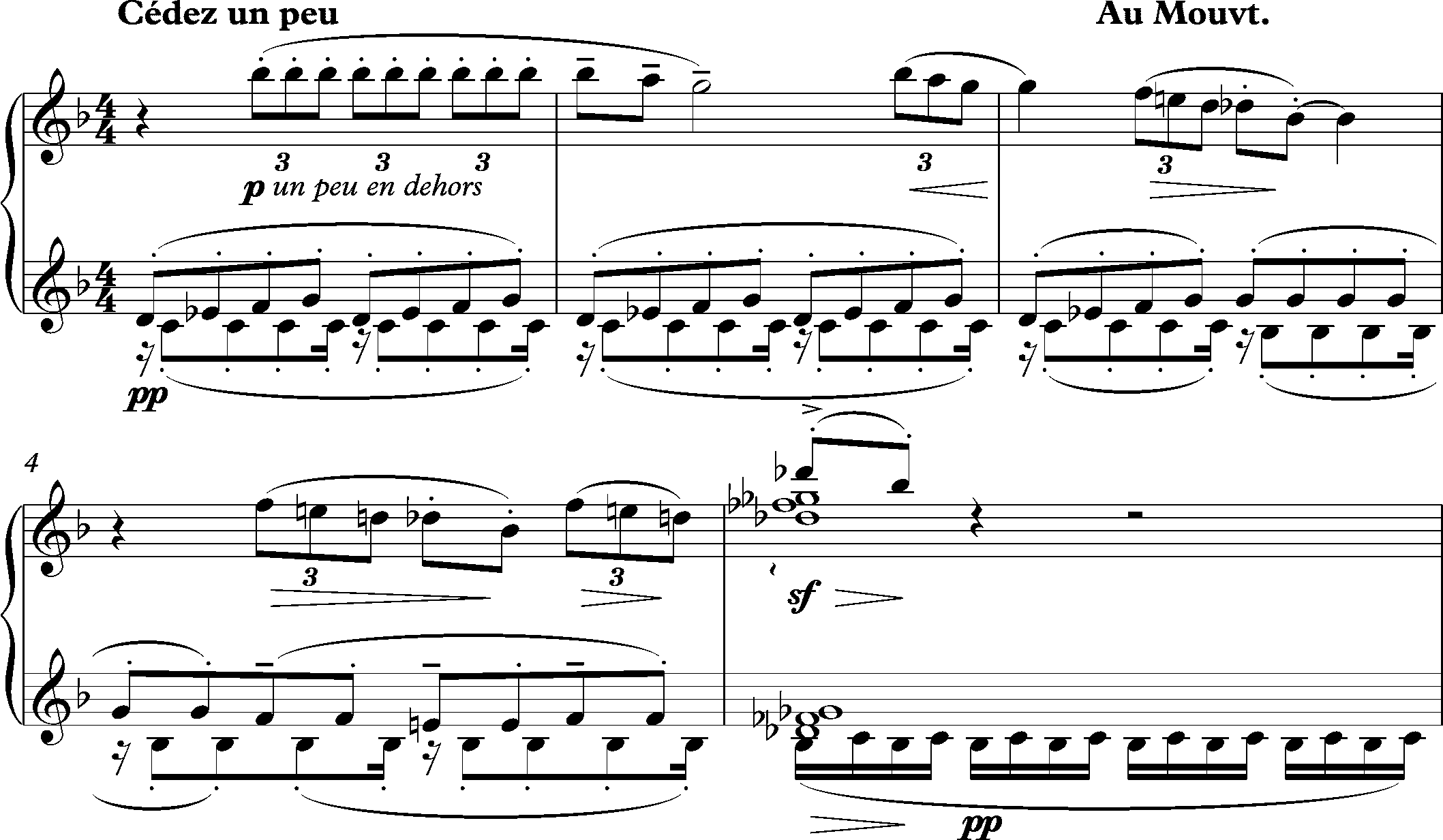
4. "The Snow Is Dancing", bars 34–38

This piece features soft, syncopated alternation of the hands. Again, there are darker moments in the bass near the middle. It portrays snow and muted objects seen through it.

=== 5. The Little Shepherd ===
5. "The Little Shepherd"

"The Little Shepherd" depicts a shepherd with his flute. There are three solos and three commentaries following them. The first solo has a breath mark at the end. This piece has different modes in it and uses dissonances, which resolve into tonality.

=== 6. Golliwogg's Cakewalk ===
6. "Golliwogg's Cakewalk"

Bars 10–13
Four measures of "Golliwogg's Cakewalk" that quote the opening of Richard Wagner's Tristan und Isolde

At the time of its composition, golliwoggs were in fashion, due partly to the popularity at that time of the novels of Florence Kate Upton ("golliwog" is a later usage). They were stuffed black dolls with red pants, red bow ties and wild hair, reminiscent of the blackface minstrel shows of the time. The cakewalk was a dance or a strut, and the dancer with the most elaborate steps won a cake ("took the cake"). The piece is a ragtime with its syncopations and banjo-like effects. The dynamic range is quite large and very effective.

During the piece, Debussy alludes satirically to Richard Wagner's opera Tristan und Isolde. The opening bars turn the famous half-diminished Tristan chord into a jaunty, syncopated arpeggio, while the middle 'B' section of this dance is interrupted on several occasions by the love-death leitmotif, marked avec une grande émotion (with great feeling). Each quotation is followed by banjo imitations.

Debussy composed one more piece in the same style a year later, "The Little Nigar", as part of a piano method.

== Orchestrations and arrangements ==
- French composer André Caplet orchestrated the entire suite in 1911.
- Danish composer Hans Abrahamsen orchestrated the entire suite in 2015.
- Scottish guitarist Paul Galbraith transcribed the entire suite for brahms guitar in 2006.
- Leigh Howard Stevens transcribed five of the six movements for marimba.
- Japanese composer Isao Tomita transcribed the fourth and sixth movements for Moog synthesizer in 1974 (RCA CD RCD14587).
