= Richard Langham Smith =

British musicologist

Richard Langham Smith (born 10 September 1947, Barnes, London) is an English musicologist who has written on Debussy and contemporary French music in general. For his contribution to the latter he was admitted to rank of Chevalier of the Ordre des Arts et des Lettres.

Educated in music at University of York, Richard Langham Smith then pursued further study with Wilfrid Mellers and Debussy scholar Edward Lockspeiser as well as studying harpsichord and Baroque performance practice at the Amsterdam Conservatory. A university teaching career began at University of Lancaster, then City University, the University of Exeter, and finally the Open University where he was the Arnold Kettle Distinguished Scholar in Music and subsequently Head of Department. At this time he also was a visiting lecturer in Music at the University of Cambridge, teaching a course on French Opera from 1875 to the 21st Century. From September 2008 until July 2010 Smith was Head of the Graduate School at the Royal College of Music, London. In 2011 the RCM appointed him Research Professor in Music and in March 2016 Smith was awarded an FRCM. In addition to Academic teaching he is a lecturer for Martin Randall Travel, a regular broadcaster and lecturer for major concert venues and opera houses.
