= Images pour orchestre =

Composition (1905–1912) Claude Debussy

- Orchestral music by Claude Debussy
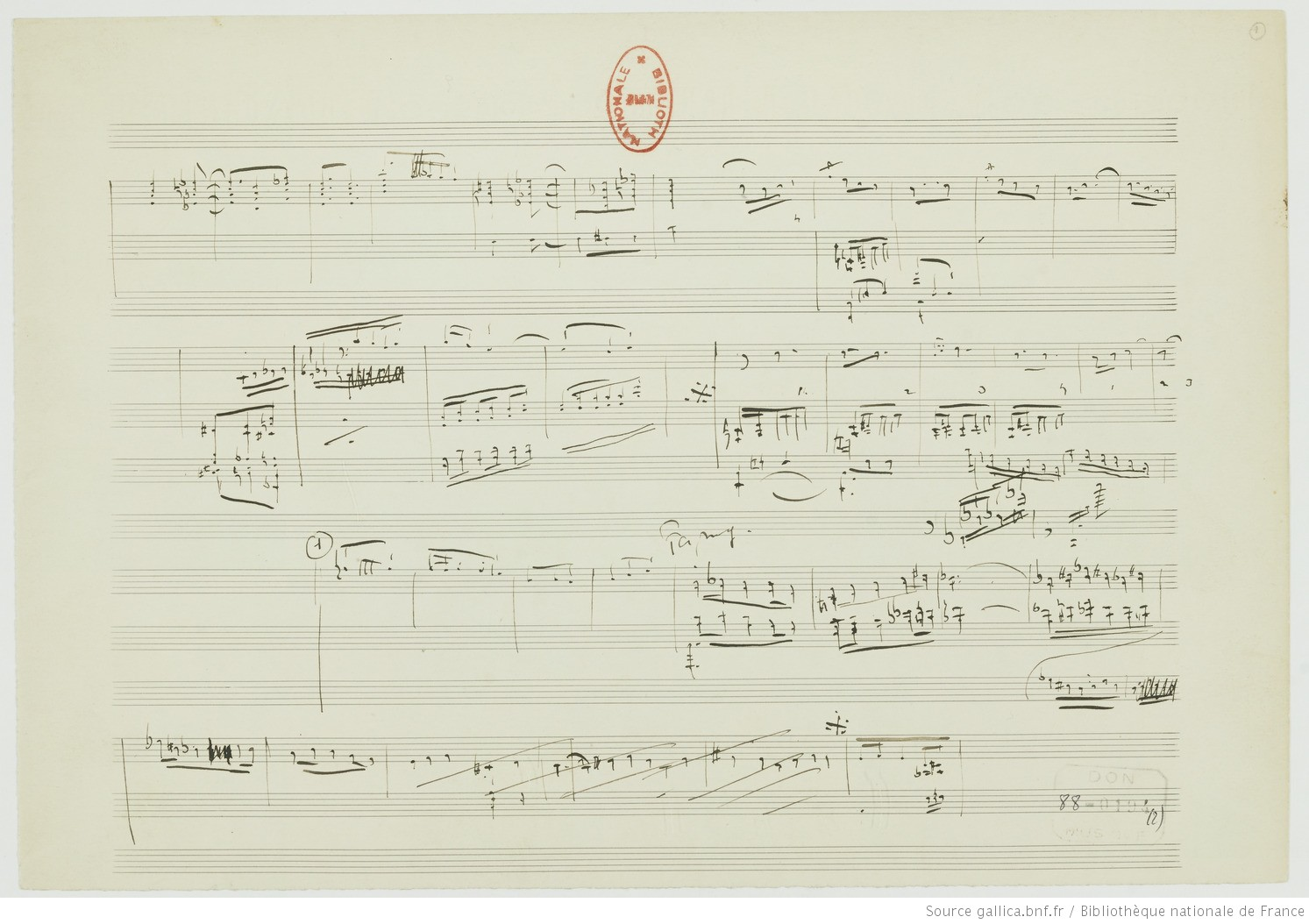
- Orchestral sketches for parts 1 and 3 of Ibéria, autograph by Debussy
- English: Images for Orchestra
- Catalogue: L. 122
- Composed: 1905–1912
- Dedication: Emma Bardac
- Performed: 26 January 1913; 113 years ago Paris
- Movements: three sections, five movements

Images pour orchestre, L. 122, is an orchestral composition in three sections by Claude Debussy, written between 1905 and 1912. Debussy had originally intended this set of Images as a two-piano sequel to the first set of Images for solo piano, as described in a letter to his publisher Durand in September 1905. However, by March 1906, in another letter to Durand, he had begun to think of arranging the work for orchestra rather than two pianos. Debussy dedicated the work to his second wife, Emma Bardac.

== Scoring ==
Images pour orchestre is scored for a large orchestra consisting of 2 piccolos, 2 flutes, 2 oboes, oboe d'amore, cor anglais, 3 clarinets, bass clarinet, 3 bassoons, contrabassoon, 4 horns, 4 trumpets (in C), 3 trombones, tuba, timpani, field drum, tambourine, castanets, 2 harps, celesta, triangle, xylophone, cymbals, 3 bells, and strings.

== Sections ==
=== I. Gigues (1909–1912) ===
The original title of Gigues was Gigues tristes. Debussy used his memories of England as inspiration for the music, in addition to the song "Dansons la gigue" by Charles Bordes and the Tyneside folk tune "The Keel Row", which are used as key themes. Revolving around Gigues are musical cells which give a sense of unity to the piece. Most are short motifs which appear once or twice or are reused in fragments throughout the piece. Other themes are long solo passages written particularly for the oboe d'amore.

There is debate over the role of André Caplet in the orchestration of Gigues. Robert Orledge and Williametta Spencer have accepted that Caplet assisted with the orchestration. According to François Lesure, however, the manuscript score in the Bibliothèque nationale (MS 1010) shows no evidence of Caplet's involvement.

=== II. Ibéria (1905–1908) ===
Ibéria is the most popular of the three orchestral Images and itself forms a triptych within the triptych. Its sections are:

1. Par les rues et par les chemins (Along the streets and along the paths)
2. Les parfums de la nuit (The scents of the night)
3. Le matin d'un jour de fête (The morning of a festive day) – a procession of a 'banda de guitarras'

Impressions of Spain inspired this music. Richard Langham Smith has commented on Debussy's own wish to incorporate ideas of juxtaposing elements of the visual arts in musical terms, including a quote from Debussy to Caplet from a letter of 26 February 1910: "You can't imagine how naturally the transition works between 'Parfums de la nuit' and 'Le Matin d'un jour de fête. Ça n'a pas l'air d'être écrit."

Matthew Brown has briefly commented on Debussy's use of techniques such as incomplete progressions, parenthetical episodes, and interpolations in Ibéria.

=== III. Rondes de printemps ("Round dances of spring") (1905–1909) ===
Debussy used two folk tunes, "Nous n'irons plus au bois" and "Do, do l'enfant do" in this movement. Brown, Dempster and Headlam have analyzed the tonal structure of this movement. The first song plays a prominent role from the start of the 15/8 time until the end of the movement, in the solos and in the accompaniments and countermelodies. Debussy had already quoted the song Nous n'irons plus au bois in Images oubliées of 1894 for piano and in Jardins sous la pluie from Estampes (1903).

== Performance history ==
The premiere of the entire triptych was given on 26 January 1913, under Debussy's baton at the Concerts Colonne.

The Iberia movement had already been given a public performance on 20 February 1910 at the Concerts Colonne, conducted by Gabriel Pierné. The Rondes de printemps movement was given a performance as well, on 2 March of the same year at the Durand Concerts at the Salle Gaveau, conducted by the composer.

The British premiere was on 18 September 1913 at the Promenade Concerts, under the baton of Henry Wood.
