= Piano Trio (Debussy) =

Piano composition by Claude Debussy

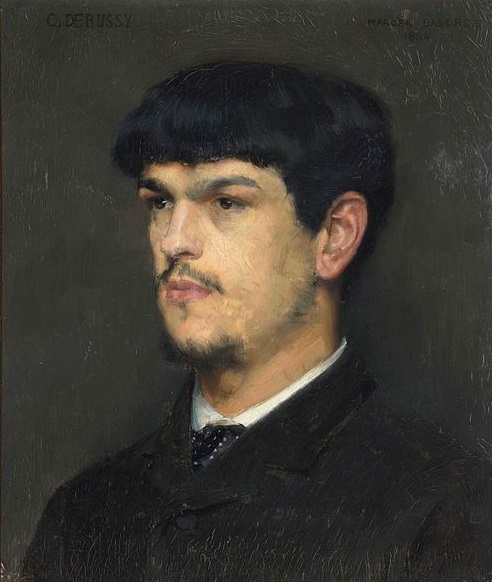
Claude Debussy by Marcel Baschet, 1884

The Piano Trio in G major, L. 5 (revised Lesure catalogue; originally L. 3), was written by an 18-year-old Claude Debussy in 1880 in Fiesole, Italy, where he resided at Nadezhda von Meck's. Most of the autograph of the piano trio was thought to be lost until 1982, when it was discovered from the legacy of Maurice Dumesnil, a pupil of Debussy's. The first edition was published in 1986.

== Movements ==
The work is in four movements:

1. Andantino con moto allegro (G major)
2. Scherzo: Moderato con allegro (B minor, trio in B major)
3. Andante espressivo (G major)
4. Finale: Appassionato (G minor → G major)

A typical performance lasts 20–25 minutes.

== Critical response ==
In 1984, music critic Harold C. Schonberg wrote of an early, incomplete recording of the trio: "The Debussy piece is juvenilia. You can have a lot of fun putting it on the turntable and asking your learned friends who the composer is. Nothing in the music suggests Debussy. It is sweet, sentimental, and sugared; it verges on the salon."

Reviewer Charlotte Gardner for the BBC wrote in 2012, of a later recording: "Debussy's teenage Piano Trio doesn't often get to see the light of day, mostly because it reveals him very much still in feet-finding mode. Still, it's an enjoyable listen, and it’s interesting to compare its pizzicato second movement with that of the Quartet, and the Brodskys and [pianist] Jean-Efflam Bavouzet are evidently having some fun. They're an effortless partnership, making make much of the work's smoochy, romantic leanings, the high beauty of many of its passages, and its light, clear textures."
