= Matt Browne =

Matt Browne may refer to:

- Matt Browne (speedway rider) (born 1983), American motorcycle speedway rider
- Matt Browne (hurler) (born 1942), former hurling player of Wexford GAA

== See also ==
- Matt Brown (disambiguation)
