= Freak show fight =

Type of mixed martial art competition

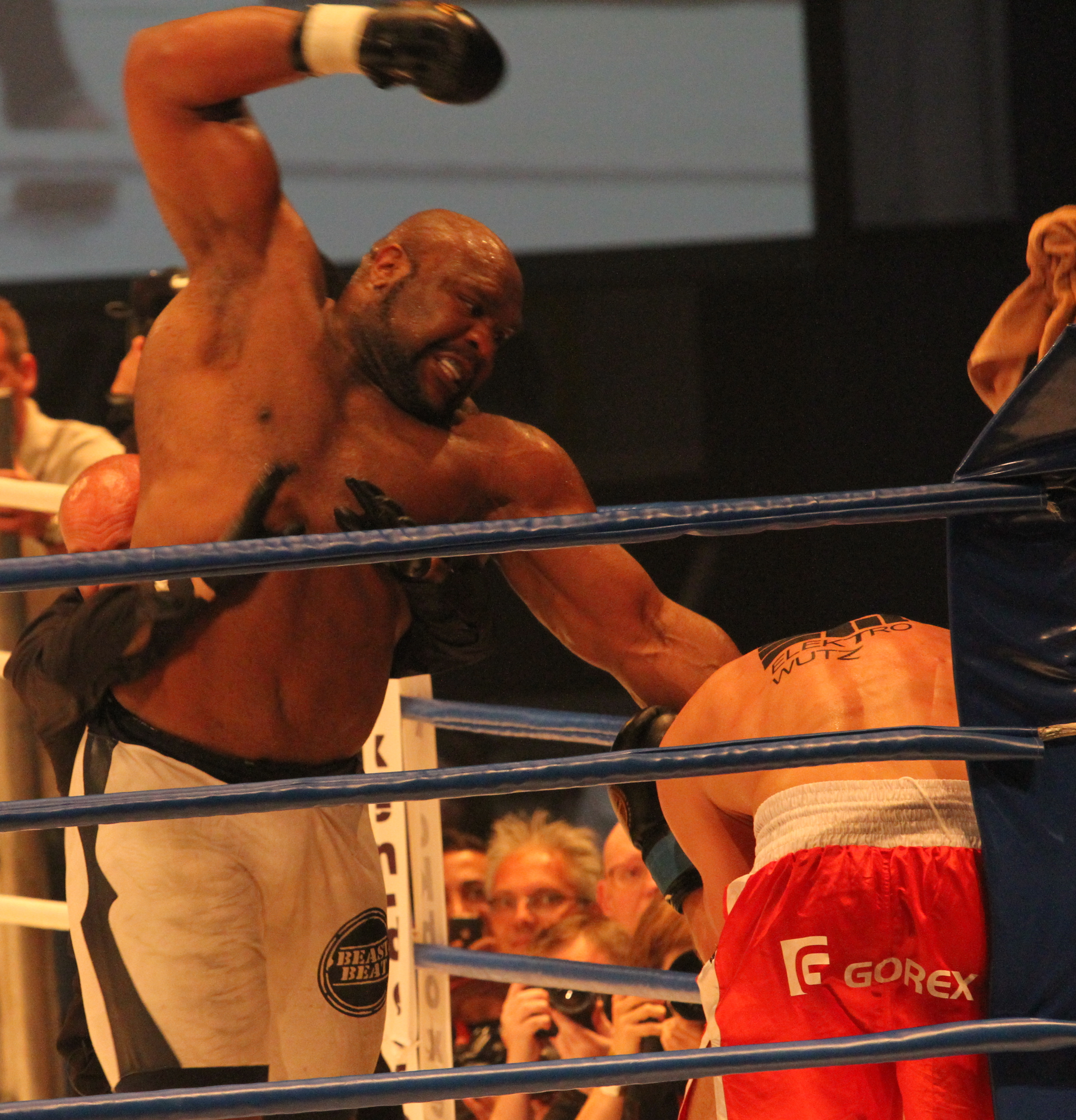
Bob Sapp facing Florian Pavic

In kickboxing and mixed martial arts (MMA), "freak show fight" is an idiom for a bout featuring a deep disparity in skill, experience, or weight between the fighters. This kind of matchup was common in the early period of mixed martial arts history, but it has become increasingly rare due to the regulation of athletic commissions and the implementation of official weight classes. However, freak show fights remain particularly associated in popular culture to Japanese promotions, where they are still occasionally hosted. Those bouts are a source of controversy among pundits, who compare them to exploitative freak shows, claiming they elevate spectacle over true competition. Such fights retain a measure of acceptance among wider audiences, due to their entertainment value.

== History ==
Early MMA promotions usually held little to no control over ability and weight, which resulted in heavily unbalanced openweight matchups. The first events of Ultimate Fighting Championship are acknowledged to have featured recurrent freak show fights, with the most famous being possibly the fight between 200lbs kenpo fighter Keith Hackney and 600lbs sumo wrestler Emmanuel Yarbrough. UFC 8 was subtitled "David vs. Goliath" as it pitted larger fighters against smaller fighters. Such matchups reflected the UFC's original emphasis on spectacle and the novelty of testing different martial arts against one another. The promotion did not completely move away from them until the end of the 1990s, as the UFC came under greater public scrutiny and sought sanctioning by athletic commissions, adopting weight divisions common in other combat sports.

Around the same time, in turn, Japanese company Pride Fighting Championships embraced the concept, initiating the custom of creating matchups based on the idea of "technique vs. size" or "David vs. Goliath". Former Pancrase fighter Ikuhisa Minowa "Minowaman" became a usual participant against superheavyweight fighters of diverse backgrounds, as did 400lbs (181 kg) professional wrestler Giant Silva from the opposite side. This trend was adopted by Japanese kickboxing promotion K-1, pushing the fighting careers of highly publicized superheavyweights like Bob Sapp, Akebono and Choi Hong-Man, who also competed at Pride. Freak show fighters usually drew large TV ratings in Japan, with a special match pitting Sapp against Akebono at the New Year's Eve event Dynamite!! 2003 breaking historical records, reaching a peak rating of 43.0% surpassing NHK's Kōhaku Uta Gassen, an annual New Year's Eve music program and one of Japan's most-watched television broadcasts.

This concept was taken to its most explicit form by Pride's successor DREAM in 2009 with the introduction of the Super Hulk Tournament, officially billed as the "World Superman Championship." The eight-man open-weight tournament was built around mismatched fighters of radically different sizes and backgrounds, including former baseball player José Canseco, Bob Sapp, K-1 fighter Mark Hunt, Choi Hong-man, and much smaller mixed martial artists such as Ikuhisa Minowa, Gegard Mousasi and Rameau Thierry Sokoudjou. The tournament was structured across three events, with Minowa defeating the nearly 400lb (181 kg) Sapp by submission in the quarterfinals and the 7'2'' (218 cm), 319lb (145 kg) Choi by heel hook in the semifinals. Minowa subsequently defeated Sokoudjou in the final at K-1 Dynamite!! 2009 event on New Year's Eve 2009, winning the tournament and reinforcing his reputation as a "giant killer".

In 2010, due to a series of challenges, boxer James Toney fought former UFC Heavyweight champion Randy Couture in a mixed martial arts bout despite not having any mixed martial arts experience, being quickly submitted. UFC president Dana White criticized the match, calling it a freak show fight. Also, after her debut in 2015, Gabi Garcia's career for Rizin Fighting Federation (a promotion successor to Pride) has been criticized by its abundance of freak show fights. A notable example occurred on December 31, 2016, at Rizin 4, when Garcia, a 6'2" (187 cm), 209.2 lb (94.9 kg) fighter, faced 49-year-old professional wrestler Yumiko Hotta, who was approximately 5'5" (165 cm) and weighed 171 lb (77.6 kg), defeating her via technical knockout in 41 seconds.

In 2020, Thai company Full Metal Dojo started running the Fight Circus events, which featured unconventional combat sports matches, including crotch-kicking bouts, Siamese twins boxing, inter-gender grappling, kicking-only bouts, two-versus-one fights, blindfolded Muay Thai, dwarf fighting, telephone booth fighting, Indian leg wrestling, and other unusual formats. The promotion became known for its deliberately absurd rulesets and spectacle, including its "Wheel of Violence" format and matches involving multiple opponents. The Fight Circus' events featured famous fighters such as UFC Hall of Famer Mark Coleman, Matt Brown, Bob Sapp, and Quinton "Rampage" Jackson. Coleman and Brown appeared at Fight Circus 12 in 2025, with Coleman competing in a wheelchair boxing match and Brown fighting Muay Thai fighter Blobtang.
