= Matt Brown =

Matt or Matthew Brown may refer to:

== Sports ==
- Matt Brown (fighter) (born 1981), American mixed martial arts fighter
- Matt Brown (basketball) (born 1969), former head basketball coach at the University of Missouri-Kansas City
- Matt Brown (ice hockey) (born 1999), American ice hockey player
- Matt Brown (kick returner) (born 1989), American football kick returner
- Matt Brown (parathlete) (born 1976), paralympic track and field athlete in Idalou, Texas
- Matt Brown (running back) (1891–1954), American football player
- Matty Brown (born 1990), English footballer
- Matthew Brown (baseball) (born 1982), Major League Baseball third baseman
- Matt Brown, New Zealand sprinter (born 1986), see Athletics at the 2006 Commonwealth Games – Men's 4 × 100 metres relay

== Politics ==
- Matt Brown (American politician) (born 1969), co-founder of Global Zero, former secretary of state of Rhode Island
- Matthew Brown (Arkansas politician), member of the Arkansas House of Representatives
- Matt Brown (Australian politician) (born 1972), former member of the New South Wales Legislative Assembly
- Matt Brown (Canadian politician), former mayor of London, Ontario, Canada

== Other ==
- Matthew Brown (college president) (1776–1853), president of Jefferson College and Washington College
- Matthew Brown (academic), British-American music theorist
- Matthew B. Brown (1964–2011), Latter-day Saint writer and historian
- Matt Brown (broadcaster) (born 1973), British television and radio presenter
- Matthew Brown brewery, Blackburn, United Kingdom
- Matthew Brown Games, a company behind the games Hexcells, SquareCells and CrossCell

== See also ==
- Matt Browne (disambiguation)
