= Hommage à S. Pickwick Esq. P.P.M.P.C. =

Piano prelude by Claude Debussy

"Hommage à S. Pickwick"
Performed by Patrizia Prati

"Hommage à S. Pickwick"
Performed by Giorgi Latsabidze

"Hommage à S. Pickwick Esq. P.P.M.P.C." is the 9th piece in Claude Debussy's second set of préludes. The prelude's title refers to the protagonist of Charles Dickens' The Pickwick Papers – P.P.M.P.C. stands for "Perpetual President Member of the Pickwick Club". The piece is characteristic for its eccentric shifts in expression and often melancholy or sentimental tone. It is also notable for incorporating the opening refrain from "God Save the King". A performance lasts approximately two and a half minutes.
