= Musée Claude-Debussy =

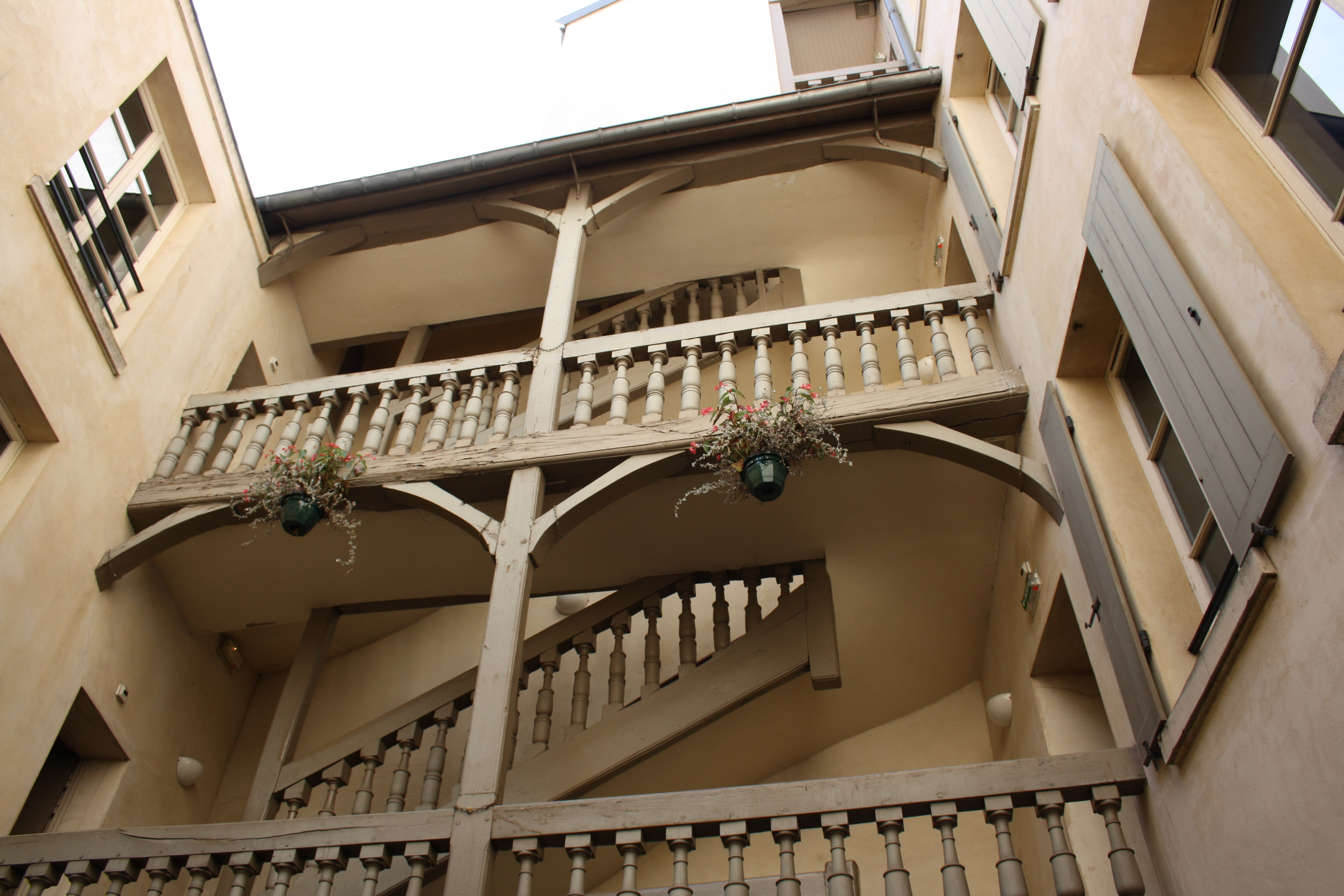
- The courtyard staircase
- Established: 1990
- Location: 38 rue au Pain; 78100 Saint-Germain-en-Laye, France
- Coordinates: 48°53′49″N 2°5′34″E
- Type: Biographical museum
- Website: www.seine-saintgermain.fr/en/file/797419/a-museum-celebrating-the-famous-composer-claude-debussy/

The Musée Claude-Debussy, or Maison Claude Debussy, is the birthplace of the composer Claude Debussy, in Saint-Germain-en-Laye, a western suburb of Paris, France. It contains a small museum about the composer.

The house was built in the 17th century. Claude Debussy was born here on 22 August 1862, and lived here in early childhood; his father had a china shop on the ground floor.

The museum opened in 1990. It is reached by a wooden staircase in the inner courtyard. There are two rooms containing objects, furniture, manuscripts, photographs and paintings relating to the composer. A third room is a small auditorium.

The wooden staircase is a monument historique. The award Maisons des Illustres ("Houses of the illustrious") has been given to the museum.

== See also ==
- List of music museums
