= Raoul Bardac =

Classical composer and pianist (1881–1950)

Raoul Bardac (30 March 1881 – 30 July 1950) was a French classical composer and pianist.

== Biography ==
Born in Paris in 1881, Bardac was Emma Bardac's son and became Claude Debussy's stepson after the marriage of the latter to his mother. He is the brother of Hélène Bardac, known as Dolly, who became Madame Gaston de Tinan and until her death in 1985, the beneficiary of Debussy's work.

Bardac inherited Debussy's Blüthner piano and took it to Meyssac when he retired. This piano was acquired by the Musée Labenche at Brive-la-Gaillarde in 1989.

Bardac died in Meyssac at the age of 69.

== Works ==
- Fleurs de crépuscule for voice and piano, lyrics by André Lebey (Mercure de France, 1899)
- Cinq Mélodies (Paris: E. Demets, 1905)
- Trois Stances de Jean Moréas (Paris: E. Demets, 1905)
- Tel qu'en songe (words: Henri de Régnier) (Paris: E. Demets, 1905)
- Horizons, first collection (Paris: E. Demets, 1906)
- Esclavage (words by Henry Gauthier-Villars) (Paris: A.-Z. Mathot, 1910)
- Horizons, second collection (Paris: E. Demets, 1912)
- Petite suite majeure, for piano 4-hands (Paris: A. Durand, 1914)
- Simone (words by Remy de Gourmont) (Paris: A. Durand, 1914)

== Bibliography ==
- Hommage à Raoul Bardac: Paris 1881 – Meyssac 1950 (Meyssac: Association Culture et Patrimoine du Canton de Meyssac, 2006)
