= SquareCells =

2015 puzzle video game

- Developer: Matthew Brown Games
- Publisher: Matthew Brown Games
- Designer: Matthew Brown
- Platforms: Microsoft Windows; macOS
- Release: 7 December 2015
- Genre: Puzzle
- Mode: Single-player

SquareCells is a 2015 puzzle game developed and published by Matthew Brown Games. It was released for Steam on 7 December 2015.

== Gameplay ==
The player must fill in or blank out tiles based on numerical information given at the top or side of each row or column. The numbers describe the relationships between the tiles: one number on its own mean there are that many filled tiles will be that line; if one number follows another, that means that the tiles are grouped up in that order. For example, "2 4" means that there is a group of two tiles followed by a group of four. Some tiles may also contain numbers inside them: this number displays how many tiles are in a group surrounding it, including the numbered tile itself. The game includes 36 levels.

== Development ==
SquareCells was released on Steam on 7 December 2015.

== Reception ==
The game has been described as "satisfying", "completely superb", and "honestly brilliant", and has been compared to the game Picross as well as being called a cross between Minesweeper and Sudoku.

One criticism was that the game's puzzles only take up a small amount of the screen, negatively affecting readability. Another criticism was that the counter at the bottom of the screen counted how many tiles needing to be removed were left instead of counting how many tiles to be kept were left.

== See also ==
- Hexcells
