= Hexcells =

- Genre: Puzzle
- Developer: Matthew Brown Games
- Publisher: Matthew Brown Games
- Creator: Matthew Brown
- Platforms: Microsoft Windows; macOS; Linux; iOS
- First release: Hexcells; 20 February 2014
- Latest release: Hexcells Infinite; 1 September 2014

Hexcells is a puzzle video game series developed and published by British designer Matthew Brown. There are three games in the series: Hexcells, Hexcells Plus, and Hexcells Infinite.

== Gameplay ==
The gameplay of each installment in Hexcells is similar to Minesweeper. Each level contains a grid of hexagonal orange tiles. Under each tile hides a shape that is coloured either blue or black. The player left-clicks a tile if they think it is blue and right-clicks if they think it is black. Each black tile and some blue tiles display a number which represents how many blue tiles it is bordering. The objective of each level is to locate all of the blue tiles with the fewest mistakes.

At the top of each row, column and diagonal in each level there is a number which displays how many blue tiles there are in that section. These numbers, as well as the numbers inside the blue or black tiles, may have symbols surrounding them: curly brackets ({}) show that the neighbouring blue shapes are conjoined, and hyphens (-) show that they are not.

Each game contains six "worlds" of 36 levels, and Hexcells Infinite contains an extra "infinite" mode with procedurally generated levels.

The art style is minimalistic and has a contrast between the orange and blue tiles.

== Development ==
Hexcells was in development throughout 2013. Hexcells and Hexcells Plus were released on 20 February 2014, and Hexcells Infinite was released on 1 September 2014.

== Reception ==
The games have been commonly compared to Minesweeper. They were praised for their simplistic art style and contrastive colours. One stated negative was that there was no punishment for making mistakes.

Hexcells Infinite was rated 80/100 by New Game Network, who described it as "a unique idea based around the age old concepts of logic". Rock Paper Shotgun described the game as a "ludicrous pleasure to play".

== See also ==
- SquareCells
