= Matt Browne (hurler) =

Irish Gaelic sportsperson

Personal information
- Native name: Maitiú de Brún (Irish)
- Born: Enniscorthy, County Wexford
- Height: 6 ft 0 in (183 cm)

Sport
- Sport: Hurling
- Position: Rightwing-back
Club
- Years: Club
- 1950s-1970s: Enniscorthy Shamrocks
Inter-county
- Years: County
- 1969-1972: Wexford
Inter-county titles
- Leinster titles: 1
- All-Irelands: 0
- NFL: 0
- All Stars: 0

Matt Browne (born 1942 in Enniscorthy, County Wexford, Ireland) was an Irish sportsperson. He played hurling with his local club Enniscorthy Shamrocks and was a member of the Wexford senior inter-county team from 1969 until 1972.
