= Matthew Brown (academic) =

British-American music theorist, musicologist, educator, and artistic director

Matthew G. Brown
- Born: London
- Occupations: Music theorist, musicologist, educator, and artistic director

Academic background
- Education: B. Mus. M. A. Musicology; Ph. D. Musicology
- Alma mater: King's College, London; Cornell University; Harvard University

Academic work
- Institutions: Eastman School of Music

Matthew G. Brown is a British-American music theorist, musicologist, educator, and artistic director. He is Professor of Music Theory at Eastman School of Music.

Brown has worked extensively on tonal theory, especially Schenkerian analysis, and on the music of Claude Debussy. He is former editor for Theory and Practice. He has also served on the executive board for Society for Music Theory, and on the American Musicological Society Council.

Brown has also worked on the connections between music and multimedia and in 2012, he founded TableTopOpera, a chamber ensemble that specializes in multimedia projects.

== Education ==
Born in London, Brown was educated at the Royal College of Music, King's College London (B.Mus., 1978), and Cornell University (MA 1982, Ph.D., 1989). From 1983 to 1986 he was a Junior Fellow of the Harvard Society of Fellows.

== Career ==
Brown started his career in 1986 as an assistant professor of musicology at the Eastman School of Music. From 1992 until 1997, he held an appointment as associate professor of Music Theory at Louisiana State University. In 1997, he rejoined the Eastman School of Music as an associate professor of Music Theory and was promoted to Professor of Music Theory in 2004.

== Works ==
Brown has authored five books, Debussy's 'Ibéria': Studies in Genesis and Structure, Explaining Tonality: Schenkerian Theory and Beyond, Debussy Redux, Heinrich Schenker's Conception of Harmony, and Ariane & Bluebeard: From Fairy Tale to Comic Book Opera.

Brown's theoretical work focuses on tonal theory, especially Schenkerian analysis. His paper The Diatonic and the Chromatic in Schenker's Theory of Harmonic Relations (1986) demonstrated how, through the concepts of mixture and tonicization, Schenker was able to explain the structure of highly chromatic music of the 18th and 19th centuries. Brown's book Explaining Tonality: Schenkerian Theory and Beyond explores the epistemic background and explanatory limits of Schenker's work; it shows how theory or certain versions of it satisfy six basic epistemic values: accuracy, scope, fruitfulness, simplicity, consistency, and coherence. Catherine Pellegrino called the book "noteworthy for its dispassionate examination of the merits and shortcomings of Schenker's Work". His recent book with Robert W. Wason, Heinrich Schenker's Conception of Harmony, places Schenker's work within the broader history of harmonic theory and was described by Nicholas Rast as a "thorough investigation of the theorist's constellation of theoretical essays". Praised for being "as engaging as it is imaginative in its analytical choices", Brown's book Debussy Redux describes how Debussy's music resurfaces in '30s swing tunes, '40s movies scores, '50s lounge/exotica, '70s rock tunes and animated films, '80s action flicks, and even Martha Stewart's Easy Listening collection.

In 2012, Brown founded TableTopOpera, a chamber ensemble that specializes in multimedia projects. In particular, TableTopOpera has collaborated with comics artist P. Craig Russell on three comic book operas (Ariane and Bluebeard, Salome, and Pelléas Redux), and has developed its own shows for the Rochester Fringe Festival that tackle progressive social issues—race relations, child poverty and infant mortality, and U.S. immigration policies. In an interview with Christopher Winders regarding TableTopOpera's production "Within The Quota", Brown stated that "We wanted to make classical music appeal to people in a way that didn't dumb it down, but presented it in a format they could process." In 2021, he began working on "Exploring Creative Design at the Human-Technology Frontier Through the Emerging 'Artist-Technologist' Occupation".

== Bibliography ==
=== Books ===
- Debussy's 'Ibéria': Studies in Genesis and Structure (2003) ISBN 978-0-19-816199-8
- Explaining Tonality: Schenkerian Theory and Beyond (2005) ISBN 978-1-58046-160-3
- Debussy Redux. The Impact of His Music on Popular Culture (2012) ISBN 978-0-253-35716-8
- Heinrich Schenker's Conception of Harmony (2020) ISBN 978-1-58046-575-5
- Ariane & Bluebeard: From Fairy Tale to Comic Book Opera. (2022)

=== Selected articles ===
- Brown, M. (1986). The Diatonic and the Chromatic in Schenker's" Theory of Harmonic Relations". Journal of Music Theory, 30(1), 1-33.
- Brown, M., & Dempster, D. J. (1989). The scientific image of music theory. Journal of Music Theory, 33(1), 65–106.
- Brown, M. (1993). Tonality and Form in Debussy's Prélude à "L'Après-midi d'un faune". Music Theory Spectrum, 15(2), 127–143.
- Brown, M. (2010). C. P. E. Bach, Schenker, Improvisation, and Composition. Intégral, 1 - 27.
- Calico, J.H., Homerin, Th. E., & Brown, M. (2015). Comic Book Opera: P. Craig Russell's Salome in a Production by Table Top Opera. The Opera Quarterly, 31, 289 - 307.
- Brown, M. (2016). Polyphony and Cacophony? A Schenkerian Reading of Strauss's 'Dance of the Seven Veils. In Beach, D., & Mak, S. Y. (Eds.). Explorations in Schenkerian Analysis (NED-New edition). Boydell & Brewer.
- Koslovsky, J., & Brown, M. (2016). The Contrapuntal Legacy of the French fin-de-siècle: A Look at Dukas's Piano Sonata in E-flat. Intégral, 129 - 152.
- Brown, M. (2019). "Follow the Leader: Debussy's Contrapuntal Games." In de Médicis, F., Duchesneau, M, & Huebner, S. (Eds.) Debussy's Resonance. Boydell & Brewer.
