= Emma Bardac =

French singer (1862–1934)

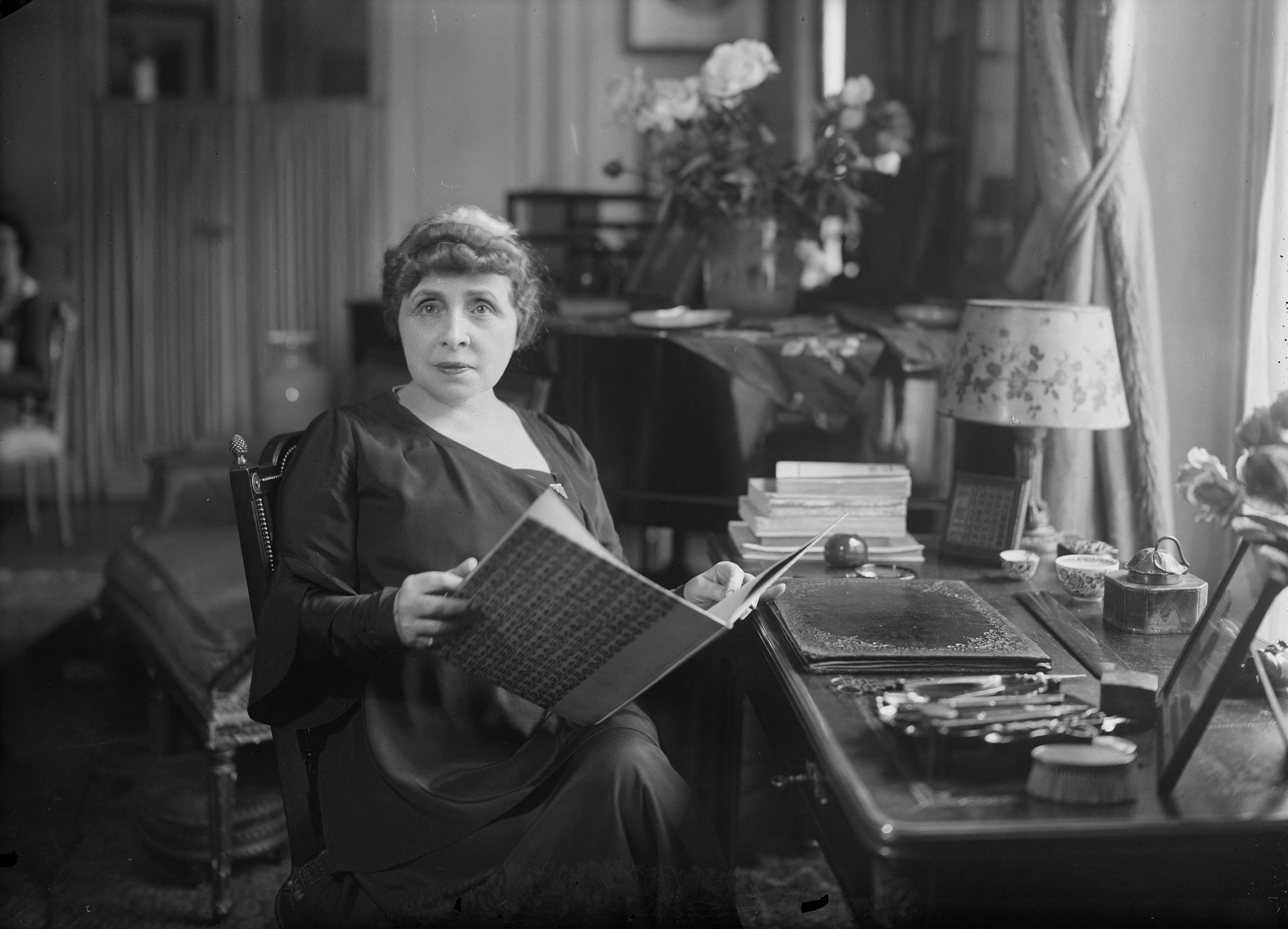
- Born: Emma Moyse; 10 July 1862; Bordeaux, France
- Died: 20 August 1934 (aged 72); Paris, France
- Resting place: Cimetière de Passy, Paris
- Occupation: Singer
- Spouses: Sigismond Bardac (m. 1878; div. 1905) Claude Debussy (m. 1908; died 1918)
- Partner: Gabriel Fauré
- Children: Raoul Bardac; Hélène, Madame Gaston de Tinan; Claude-Emma Debussy

Emma Bardac (née Moyse; 10 July 1862 – 20 August 1934) was a French singer and the mutual love interest of both Gabriel Fauré and Claude Debussy.

Of Jewish descent, Emma married in the Synagogue of Arcachon, aged 17, Parisian banker Sigismond Bardac, by whom she had two children: Raoul, and Régina-Hélène (later Madame Gaston de Tinan (1892–1985)). Emma was an accomplished singer and brilliant conversationalist. Fauré wrote his Dolly Suite in the 1890s for Regina-Hélène and La bonne chanson for Emma.

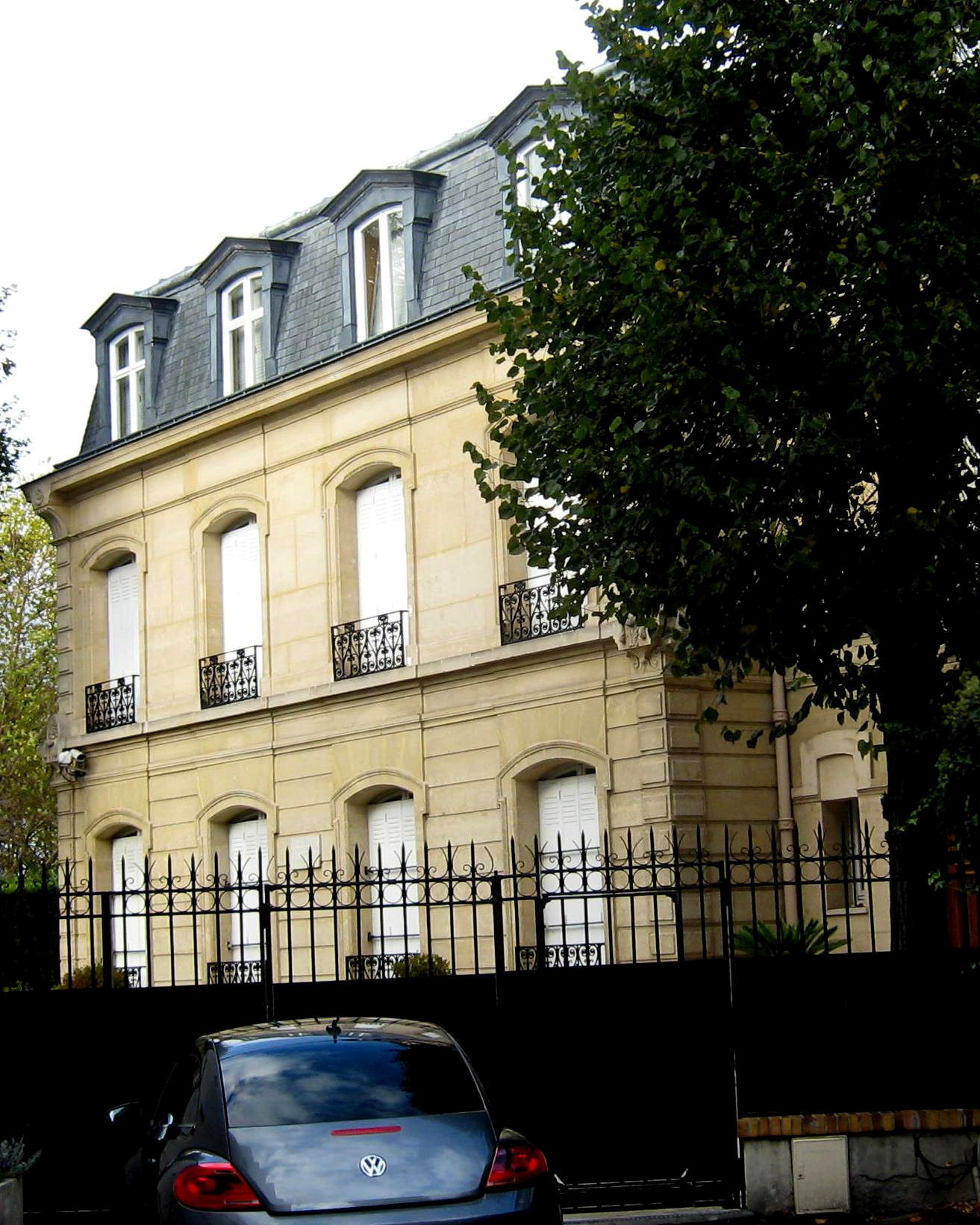
Bardac's last home, now 23 Square Avenue Foch, Paris

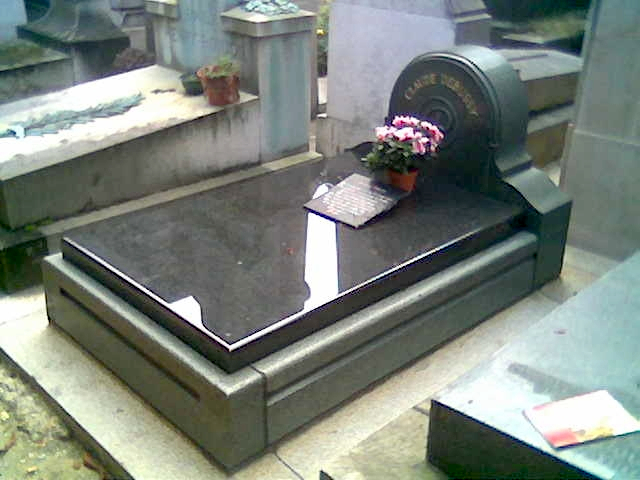
The Debussys' grave at Passy Cemetery

After her affair with Fauré, Emma was introduced to Debussy in late 1903 by her son Raoul, one of his students. In the summer of 1904, after a secret vacation with Emma in Jersey, Debussy wrote to his wife Rosalie ("Lilly") Texier announcing the end of their marriage. Distraught, Texier attempted suicide with a revolver. The ensuing scandal alienated Bardac and Debussy from friends and family, and in the spring of 1905 they fled to England, where they finalized their divorces, Emma from Sigismond on 4 May, Debussy from Rosalie on 2 August. They returned to Paris in time for the birth, on 30 October, of their daughter Claude-Emma, nicknamed "Chouchou", and dedicatee of his Children's Corner Suite composed in 1909. The couple bought a large house in a courtyard development off the Avenue du Bois de Boulogne (now Avenue Foch), where Debussy would reside for the rest of his life. Bardac eventually married Debussy in 1908, their troubled union enduring until Debussy's death 10 years later. Claude-Emma died while recovering from diphtheria in 1919 when the doctor gave her the wrong treatment, the year after her father's death. Emma Bardac died in 1934 and, like Claude-Emma, was buried in Debussy's grave in the Cimetière de Passy in Paris.

== Media ==
In a documentary film called The Loves of Emma Bardac directed by Thomas Mowrey, the duo-pianists Katia and Marielle Labèque perform a selection of pieces by composers Bizet, Fauré and Debussy. Bardac is portrayed by Iza Teller in Ken Russell's The Debussy Film released in 1965, starring Oliver Reed in the title role.

== Bibliography (further reading) ==
- Nichols, Roger The Life of Debussy (New York & Cambridge, England: Cambridge Univ. Press, 1998). ISBN 0-521-57026-3.
