= Claude Debussy =

French classical composer (1862–1918)

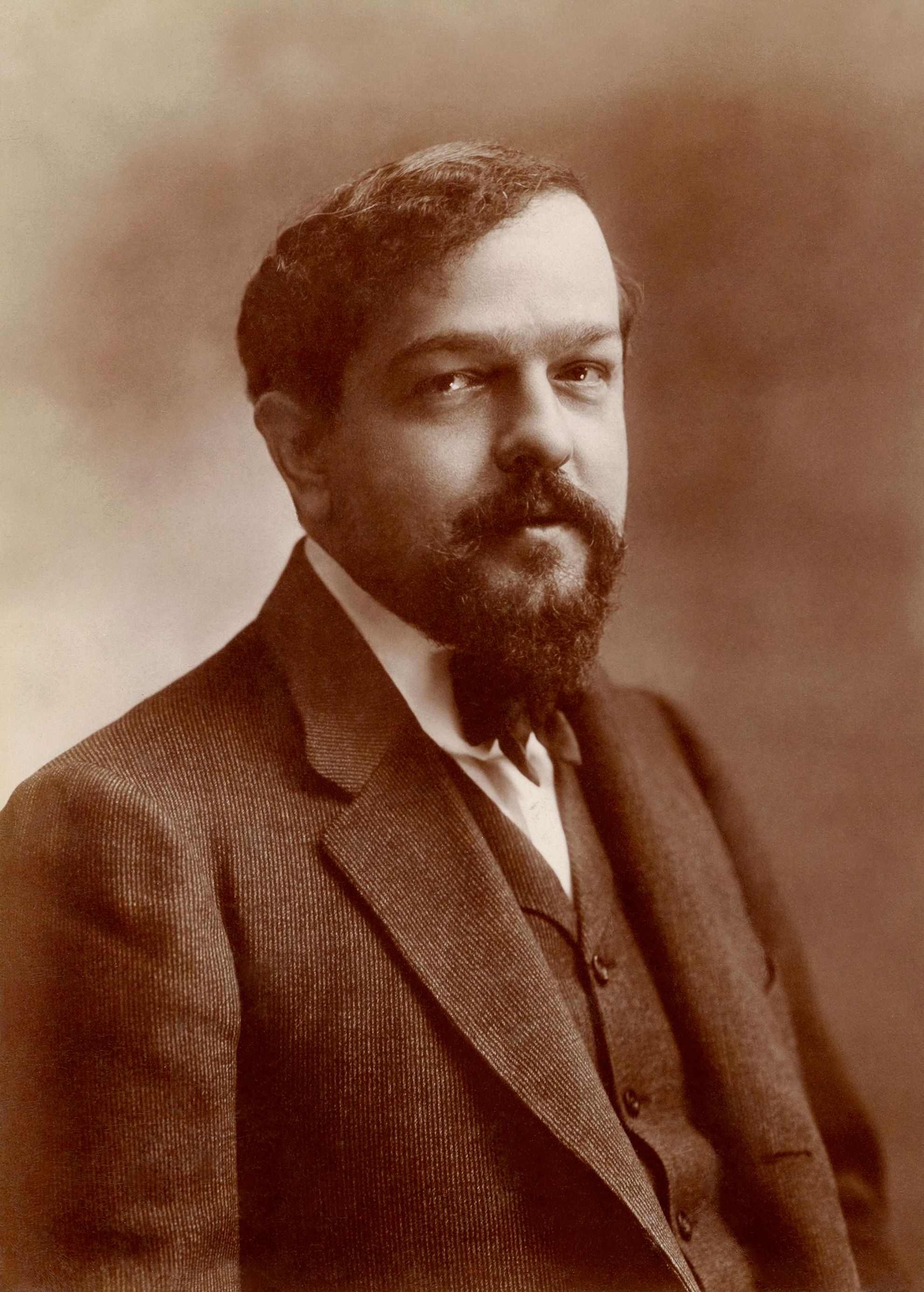
Debussy c. 1900 by Atelier Nadar

Achille Claude Debussy (Note: Debussy was addressed by various permutations of his names during the course of his life. His name was officially registered at the mairie on the day of his birth as "Achille Claude". Many authorities hyphenate "Achille-Claude". As a little boy he was addressed as "Claude"; his baptismal certificate (he was not baptised until July 1864) is in the name of "Claude-Achille"; as a youth he was known as "Achille"; at the beginning of his career he sought to make his name more impressive by calling himself "Claude-Achille" (and sometimes rendering his surname as "de Bussy"). He signed himself as "Claude-Achille" between December 1889 and 4 June 1892, after which he permanently adopted the shorter "Claude".) (French: [aʃil klod dəbysi]; (Note: English pronunciations: UK: /dəˈb(j)uːsi/, US: /ˌdeɪbjuˈsiː/) 22 August 1862 – 25 March 1918) was a French composer, born in Saint-Germain-en-Laye. He is sometimes seen as the first Impressionist composer, although he vigorously rejected the term. He was among the most influential composers of the late 19th and early 20th centuries.

Born to a family of modest means and little cultural involvement, Debussy showed enough musical talent to be admitted at the age of ten to France's leading music college, the Conservatoire de Paris. He originally studied the piano, but found his vocation in innovative composition, despite the disapproval of the Conservatoire's conservative professors. He took many years to develop his mature style, and was nearly 40 when he achieved international fame in 1902 with the only opera he completed, Pelléas et Mélisande.

Debussy's orchestral works include Prélude à l'après-midi d'un faune (1894), Nocturnes (1897–1899) and Images (1905–1912). His music was to a considerable extent a reaction against Wagner and the German musical tradition. He regarded the classical symphony as obsolete and sought an alternative in his "symphonic sketches", La mer (1903–1905). His piano works include sets of 24 Préludes and 12 Études. Throughout his career he wrote mélodies based on a wide variety of poetry, including his own. He was greatly influenced by the Symbolist poetic movement of the later 19th century. A small number of works, including the early La Damoiselle élue and the late Le Martyre de saint Sébastien have important parts for chorus. In his final years, he focused on chamber music, completing three of six planned sonatas for different combinations of instruments.

With early influences including Russian and Far Eastern music and works by Chopin and Liszt, Debussy developed his own style of harmony and orchestral colouring, derided – and unsuccessfully resisted – by much of the musical establishment of the day. His works have strongly influenced a wide range of composers including Béla Bartók, Igor Stravinsky, George Gershwin, Olivier Messiaen, George Benjamin, and the jazz pianist and composer Bill Evans. Debussy died from cancer at his home in Paris at the age of 55 after a composing career of a little more than 30 years.

== Life and career ==
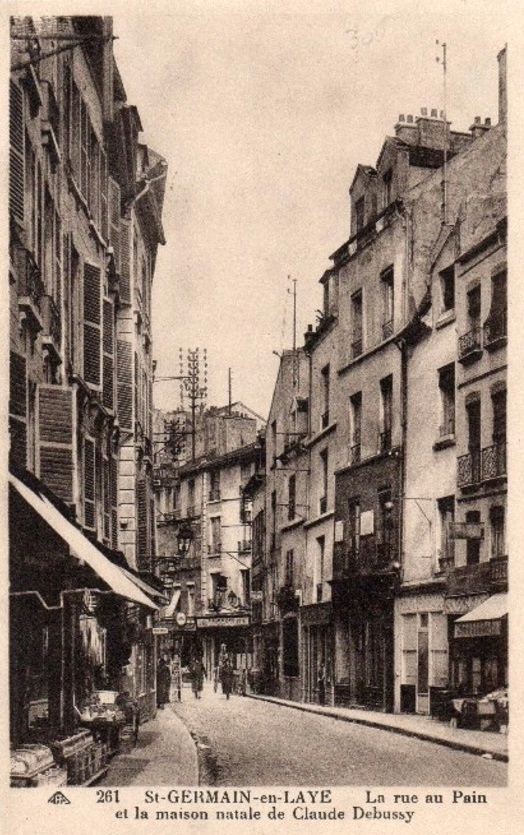
Rue au Pain, Saint-Germain-en-Laye, street of Debussy's birthplace

=== Early life ===
Debussy was born on 22 August 1862 in Saint-Germain-en-Laye, Seine-et-Oise, on the north-west fringes of Paris. (Note: Debussy's birthplace is now a museum dedicated to him. In addition to displays depicting his life and work, the building contains a small auditorium in which an annual season of concerts is given.) He was the eldest of the five children of Manuel-Achille Debussy and his wife, Victorine, née Manoury. Debussy senior ran a china shop and his wife was a seamstress. The shop was unsuccessful and closed in 1864; the family moved to Paris, first living with Victorine's mother, in Clichy, and, from 1868, in their own apartment in the Rue Saint-Honoré. Manuel worked in a printing factory.

In 1870, to escape the siege of Paris during the Franco-Prussian War, Debussy's pregnant mother took him and his sister Adèle to their paternal aunt's home in Cannes, where they remained until the following year. During his stay in Cannes, the seven-year-old Debussy had his first piano lessons; his aunt paid for him to study with an Italian musician, Jean Cerutti. Manuel Debussy remained in Paris and joined the forces of the Commune; after its defeat by French government troops in 1871 he was sentenced to four years' imprisonment, of which he only served one year. His fellow Communard prisoners included his friend Charles de Sivry, a musician. Sivry's mother, Antoinette Mauté de Fleurville, gave piano lessons, and at his instigation the young Debussy became one of her pupils. (Note: Biographers of Debussy, including Edward Lockspeiser, Stephen Walsh and Eric Frederick Jensen, comment that although Antoinette Mauté de Fleurville was a woman of some affectations, with the assumed manner of a grande dame, she was a fine teacher. She claimed to have studied with Chopin, and although many of Debussy's biographers have been sceptical about this, her artistic prowess was vouched for not only by Debussy, but by her son-in-law, Paul Verlaine.)

Debussy's talents soon became evident, and in 1872, aged ten, he was admitted to the Conservatoire de Paris, where he remained a student for the next eleven years. He first joined the piano class of Antoine François Marmontel, and studied solfège with Albert Lavignac and, later, composition with Ernest Guiraud, harmony with Émile Durand, and organ with César Franck. The course included music history and theory studies with Louis-Albert Bourgault-Ducoudray, but it is not certain that Debussy, who was apt to skip classes, actually attended these.

At the Conservatoire, Debussy initially made good progress. Marmontel said of him, "A charming child, a truly artistic temperament; much can be expected of him". Another teacher was less impressed: Émile Durand wrote in a report, "Debussy would be an excellent pupil if he were less sketchy and less cavalier." A year later he described Debussy as "desperately careless". In July 1874 Debussy received the award of deuxième accessit (Note: That is, fourth prize, after the premier accessit, the runner-up (second prix) and the winner (premier prix).) for his performance as soloist in the first movement of Chopin's Second Piano Concerto at the Conservatoire's annual competition. He was a fine pianist and an outstanding sight reader, who could have had a professional career had he wished, but he was only intermittently diligent in his studies. He advanced to premier accessit in 1875 and second prize in 1877, but failed at the competitions in 1878 and 1879. These failures made him ineligible to continue in the Conservatoire's piano classes, but he remained a student for harmony, solfège and, later, composition.

With Marmontel's help Debussy secured a summer vacation job in 1879 as resident pianist at the Château de Chenonceau, where he rapidly acquired a taste for luxury that was to remain with him all his life. His first compositions date from this period, two settings of poems by Alfred de Musset: "Ballade à la lune" and "Madrid, princesse des Espagnes". The following year he secured a job as pianist in the household of Nadezhda von Meck, the patroness of Tchaikovsky. He travelled with her family for the summers of 1880 to 1882, staying at various places in France, Switzerland and Italy, as well as at her home in Moscow. He composed his Piano Trio in G major for von Meck's ensemble, and made a transcription for piano duet of three dances from Tchaikovsky's Swan Lake. (Note: In September 1880 von Meck sent the manuscript of Debussy's Danse bohémienne for Tchaikovsky's perusal; a month later Tchaikovsky wrote back, mildly complimenting the work but remarking on its slightness and brevity. Debussy did not publish it, and the manuscript remained in the von Meck family and was not published until 1932.)

=== Prix de Rome ===
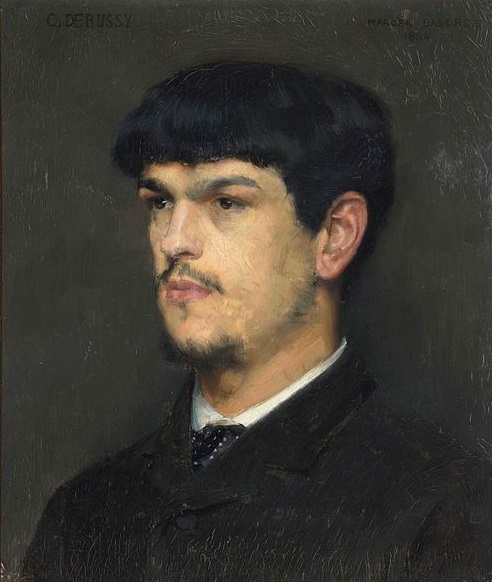
Debussy by Marcel Baschet, 1884

At the end of 1880 Debussy, while continuing his studies at the Conservatoire, was engaged as accompanist for Marie Moreau-Sainti's singing class; he took this role for four years. Among the members of the class was Marie Vasnier; Debussy was greatly taken with her, and she inspired him to compose: he wrote 27 songs dedicated to her during their seven-year relationship. She was the wife of Henri Vasnier, a prominent civil servant, and much younger than her husband. She soon became Debussy's lover as well as his muse. Whether Vasnier was content to tolerate his wife's affair with the young student or was simply unaware of it is not clear, but he and Debussy remained on excellent terms, and he continued to encourage the composer in his career.

At the Conservatoire, Debussy incurred the disapproval of the faculty, particularly his composition teacher, Guiraud, for his failure to follow the orthodox rules of composition then prevailing. (Note: The director of the Conservatoire, Ambroise Thomas, was a deeply conservative musician, as were most of his faculty. It was not until Gabriel Fauré became director in 1905 that modern music such as Debussy's or even Wagner's was accepted within the Conservatoire.) Nevertheless, in 1884 Debussy won France's most prestigious musical award, the Prix de Rome, with his cantata L'enfant prodigue. The Prix carried with it a residence at the Villa Medici, the French Academy in Rome, to further the winner's studies. Debussy was there from January 1885 to March 1887, with three or possibly four absences of several weeks when he returned to France, chiefly to see Marie Vasnier.

Initially Debussy found the artistic atmosphere of the Villa Medici stifling, the company boorish, the food bad, and the accommodation "abominable". Neither did he enjoy Italian opera, as he found the operas of Donizetti and Verdi not to his taste. He was much more impressed by the music of the 16th-century composers Palestrina and Lassus, which he heard at Santa Maria dell'Anima: "The only church music I will accept". He was often depressed and unable to compose, but he was inspired by Franz Liszt, who visited the students and played for them. In June 1885, Debussy wrote of his desire to follow his own way, saying, "I am sure the Institute would not approve, for, naturally it regards the path which it ordains as the only right one. But there is no help for it! I am too enamoured of my freedom, too fond of my own ideas!"

Debussy finally composed four pieces that were submitted to the Academy: the symphonic ode Zuleima (based on a text by Heinrich Heine); the orchestral piece Printemps; the cantata La Damoiselle élue (1887–1888), the first piece in which the stylistic features of his later music began to emerge; and the Fantaisie for piano and orchestra, which was heavily based on Franck's music and was eventually withdrawn by Debussy. The Academy chided him for writing music that was "bizarre, incomprehensible and unperformable". Although Debussy's works showed the influence of Jules Massenet, the latter concluded, "He is an enigma". During his years in Rome Debussy composed – not for the Academy – most of his Verlaine cycle, Ariettes oubliées, which made little impact at the time but was successfully republished in 1903 after the composer had become well known.

=== Return to Paris, 1887 ===
A week after his return to Paris in 1887, Debussy heard the first act of Wagner's Tristan und Isolde at the Concerts Lamoureux and judged it "decidedly the finest thing I know". In 1888 and 1889 he went to the annual festivals of Wagner's operas at Bayreuth. He responded positively to Wagner's sensuousness, mastery of form, and striking harmonies, and was briefly influenced by them, but, unlike some other French composers of his generation, he concluded that there was no future in attempting to adopt and develop Wagner's style. He commented in 1903 that Wagner was "a beautiful sunset that was mistaken for a dawn".

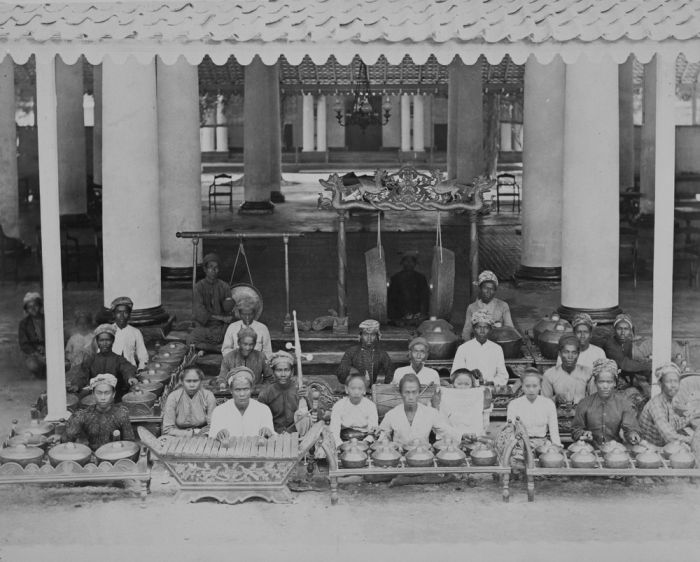
Gamelan orchestra, c. 1889

In 1889, at the Paris Exposition Universelle, Debussy first heard Javanese gamelan music. The gamelan scales, melodies, rhythms, and ensemble textures appealed to him, and echoes of them are heard in "Pagodes" in his piano suite Estampes. He also attended two concerts of Rimsky-Korsakov's music, conducted by the composer. This too made an impression on him, and its harmonic freedom and non-Teutonic tone colours influenced his own developing musical style. (Note: Debussy's regard for Rimsky-Korsakov's music was not reciprocated. After hearing Estampes a decade later, Rimsky wrote in his diary, "Poor and skimpy to the nth degree; there is no technique; even less imagination. The impudent decadent – he ignores all music that has gone before him, and ... thinks he has discovered America.")

Marie Vasnier ended her liaison with Debussy soon after his final return from Rome, although they remained on good enough terms for him to dedicate to her one more song, "Mandoline", in 1890. Later in 1890 Debussy met Erik Satie, who proved a kindred spirit in his experimental approach to composition. Both were bohemians, enjoying the same café society and struggling to survive financially. In the same year Debussy began a relationship with Gabrielle (Gaby) Dupont, a tailor's daughter from Lisieux; in July 1893 they began living together.

Debussy continued to compose songs, piano pieces and other works, some of which were publicly performed, but his music made only a modest impact, although his fellow composers recognised his potential by electing him to the committee of the Société Nationale de Musique in 1893. His String Quartet was premiered by the Ysaÿe string quartet at the Société Nationale in the same year. In May 1893 Debussy attended a theatrical event that was of key importance to his later career – the premiere of Maurice Maeterlinck's play Pelléas et Mélisande, which he immediately determined to turn into an opera. He travelled to Maeterlinck's home in Ghent in November to secure his consent to an operatic adaptation.

=== 1894–1902: Pelléas et Mélisande ===
Lilly Debussy in 1902

In February 1894 Debussy completed the first draft of Act I of his operatic version of Pelléas et Mélisande, and for most of the year worked to complete it. While still living with Dupont, he had an affair with the singer Thérèse Roger, and in 1894 he announced their engagement. His behaviour was widely condemned; anonymous letters circulated denouncing his treatment of both women, as well as his financial irresponsibility and debts. The engagement was broken off, and several of Debussy's friends and supporters disowned him, including Ernest Chausson, hitherto one of his strongest supporters.

In terms of musical recognition, Debussy made a step forward in December 1894, when the symphonic poem Prélude à l'après-midi d'un faune, based on Stéphane Mallarmé's poem of the same name, was premiered at a concert of the Société Nationale. The following year he completed the first draft of Pelléas and began efforts to get it staged. In May 1898 he made his first contacts with André Messager and Albert Carré, respectively the musical director and general manager of the Opéra-Comique, Paris, about presenting the opera.

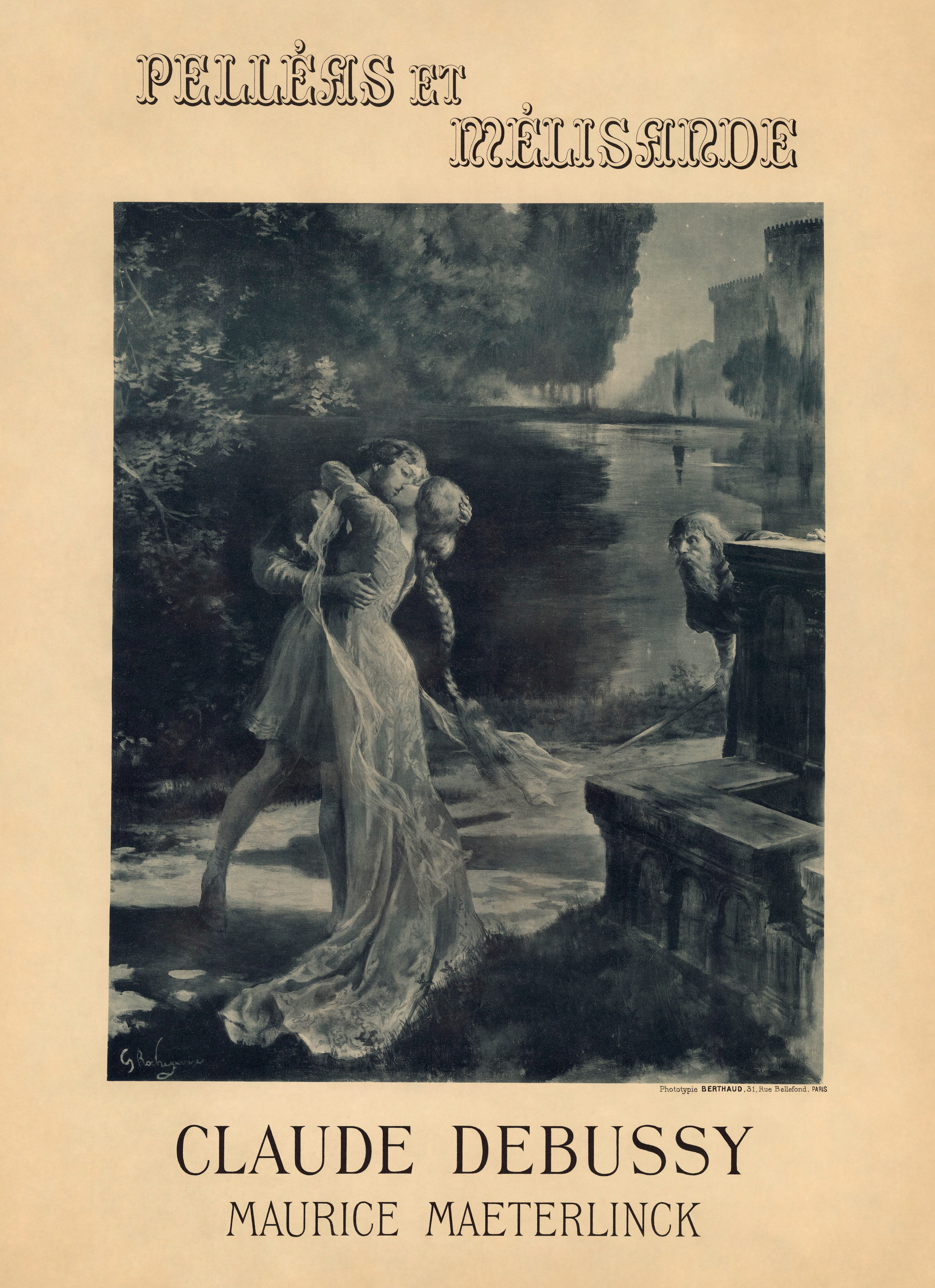
Poster by Georges Rochegrosse for the premiere of Pelléas et Mélisande (1902)

Debussy abandoned Dupont for her friend Marie-Rosalie Texier, known as "Lilly", whom he married in October 1899, after threatening suicide if she refused him. She was affectionate, practical, straightforward, and well liked by Debussy's friends and associates, but he became increasingly irritated by her intellectual limitations and lack of musical sensitivity. The marriage lasted barely five years.

From around 1900 Debussy's music became a focus and inspiration for an informal group of innovative young artists, poets, critics, and musicians who began meeting in Paris. They called themselves Les Apaches – roughly "The Hooligans" – to represent their status as "artistic outcasts". The membership was fluid, but at various times included Maurice Ravel, Ricardo Viñes, Igor Stravinsky and Manuel de Falla. (Note: Other members were the composers Florent Schmitt, Maurice Delage and Paul Ladmirault, the poets Léon-Paul Fargue and Tristan Klingsor, the painter Paul Sordes and the critic Michel Calvocoressi.) In the same year the first two of Debussy's three orchestral Nocturnes were first performed. Although they did not make any great impact with the public they were well reviewed by musicians including Paul Dukas, Alfred Bruneau and Pierre de Bréville. The complete set was given the following year.

Like many other composers of the time, Debussy supplemented his income by teaching and writing. (Note: Saint-Saëns, Franck, Massenet, Fauré and Ravel were all known as teachers, and Fauré, Messager and Dukas were regular music critics for Parisian journals.) For most of 1901 he had a sideline as music critic of La Revue Blanche, adopting the pen name "Monsieur Croche". He expressed trenchant views on composers ("I hate sentimentality – his name is Camille Saint-Saëns"), institutions (on the Paris Opéra: "A stranger would take it for a railway station, and, once inside, would mistake it for a Turkish bath"), conductors ("Nikisch is a unique virtuoso, so much so that his virtuosity seems to make him forget the claims of good taste"), musical politics ("The English actually think that a musician can manage an opera house successfully!"), and audiences ("their almost drugged expression of boredom, indifference and even stupidity"). He later collected his criticisms with a view to their publication as a book; it was published posthumously as Monsieur Croche, Antidilettante.

In January 1902 rehearsals began at the Opéra-Comique for the opening of Pelléas et Mélisande. For three months, Debussy attended rehearsals practically every day. In February there was conflict between Maeterlinck on the one hand and Debussy, Messager and Carré on the other about the casting of Mélisande. Maeterlinck wanted his mistress, Georgette Leblanc, to sing the role, and was incensed when she was passed over in favour of the Scottish soprano Mary Garden. (Note: Mary Garden was Messager's mistress at the time, but as far as is known she was chosen for wholly musical and dramatic reasons. She is described in the Grove Dictionary of Music and Musicians as "a supreme singing-actress, with uncommonly vivid powers of characterization ... and a rare subtlety of colour and phrasing.") The opera opened on 30 April 1902, and although the first-night audience was divided between admirers and sceptics, the work quickly became a success. It made Debussy a well-known name in France and abroad; The Times commented that the opera had "provoked more discussion than any work of modern times, excepting, of course, those of Richard Strauss". The Apaches, led by Ravel (who attended every one of the 14 performances in the first run), were loud in their support; the conservative faculty of the Conservatoire tried in vain to stop its students from seeing the opera. The vocal score was published in early May, and the full orchestral score in 1904.

=== 1903–1918 ===
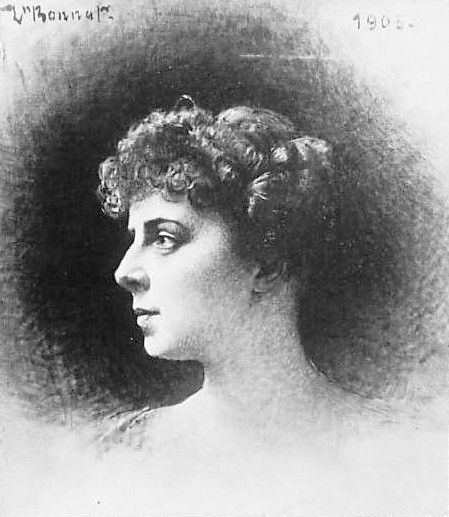
Emma Bardac (later Emma Debussy) in 1903

In 1903 there was public recognition of Debussy's stature when he was appointed a Chevalier of the Légion d'honneur, but his social standing suffered a great blow when another turn in his private life caused a scandal the following year. One of his pupils was Raoul Bardac, son of Emma and her husband, Parisian banker Sigismond Bardac. Raoul introduced his teacher to his mother, to whom Debussy quickly became greatly attracted. She was sophisticated, a brilliant conversationalist, an accomplished singer, and relaxed about marital fidelity, having been the mistress and muse of Gabriel Fauré a few years earlier. After despatching Lilly to her parental home at Bichain in Villeneuve-la-Guyard on 15 July 1904, Debussy took Emma away, staying incognito in Jersey and then at Pourville in Normandy. He wrote to his wife on 11 August from Dieppe, telling her that their marriage was over, but still making no mention of Bardac. When he returned to Paris he set up home on his own, taking a flat in a different arrondissement. On 14 October, five days before their fifth wedding anniversary, Lilly Debussy attempted suicide, shooting herself in the chest with a revolver; (Note: A fictionalised and melodramatic dramatisation of the affair, La femme nue, played in Paris in 1908. A myth grew up that Lilly Debussy shot herself in the Place de la Concorde, rather than at home. That version of events is not corroborated by Debussy scholars such as Marcel Dietschy, Roger Nichols, Robert Orledge and Nigel Simeone; and no mention of the Place de la Concorde appeared in even the most sensational press coverage at the time. Another inaccurate report of the case, in Le Figaro in early January 1905, stated that Lilly had made a second attempt at suicide.) she survived, although the bullet remained lodged in her vertebrae for the rest of her life. The ensuing scandal caused Bardac's family to disown her, and Debussy lost many good friends including Dukas and Messager. His relations with Ravel, never close, were exacerbated when the latter joined other former friends of Debussy in contributing to a fund to support the deserted Lilly.

The Bardacs divorced in May 1905. Finding the hostility in Paris intolerable, Debussy and Emma (now pregnant) went to England. They stayed at the Grand Hotel, Eastbourne in July and August, where Debussy corrected the proofs of his symphonic sketches La mer, celebrating his divorce on 2 August. After a brief visit to London, the couple returned to Paris in September, buying a house in a courtyard development off the Avenue du Bois de Boulogne (now Avenue Foch), Debussy's home for the rest of his life.

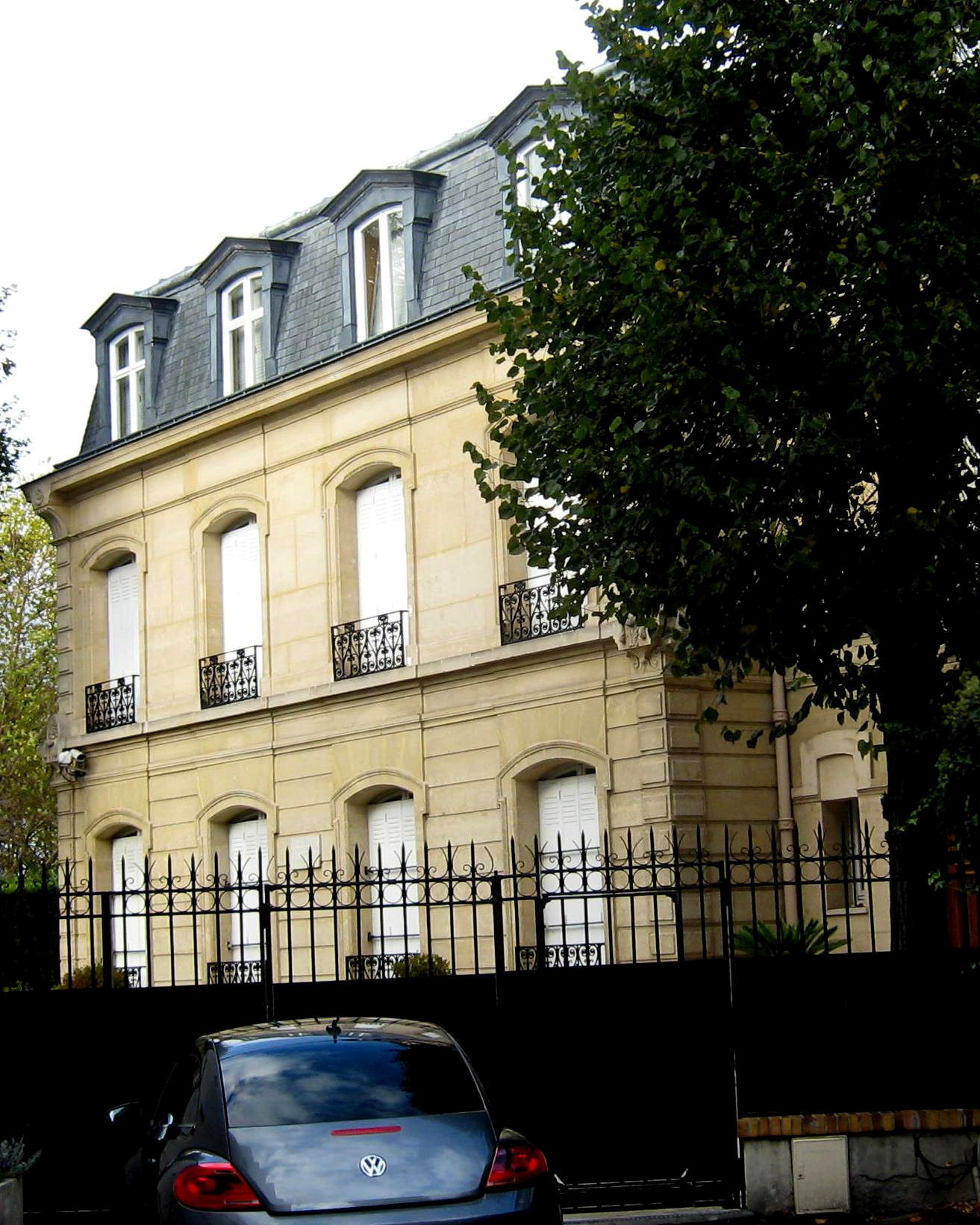
Debussy's last home

In October 1905 La mer, Debussy's most substantial orchestral work, was premiered in Paris by the Orchestre Lamoureux under the direction of Camille Chevillard; the reception was mixed. Some praised the work, but Pierre Lalo, critic of Le Temps, hitherto an admirer of Debussy, wrote, "I do not hear, I do not see, I do not smell the sea". (Note: Lalo objected to what he felt was the artificiality of the piece: "a reproduction of nature; a wonderfully refined, ingenious and carefully composed reproduction, but a reproduction none the less". Another Parisian critic, Louis Schneider, wrote, "The audience seemed rather disappointed: they expected the ocean, something big, something colossal, but they were served instead with some agitated water in a saucer.") In the same month the composer's only child was born at their home. Claude-Emma, affectionately known as "Chouchou", was a musical inspiration to the composer (she was the dedicatee of his Children's Corner suite). She outlived her father by scarcely a year, succumbing to the diphtheria epidemic of 1919. Mary Garden said, "I honestly don't know if Debussy ever loved anybody really. He loved his music – and perhaps himself. I think he was wrapped up in his genius", but biographers are agreed that whatever his relations with lovers and friends, Debussy was devoted to his daughter.

Debussy and Emma Bardac eventually married in 1908, their troubled union enduring for the rest of his life. The following year began well, when at Fauré's invitation, Debussy became a member of the governing council of the Conservatoire. His success in London was consolidated in April 1909, when he conducted Prélude à l'après-midi d'un faune and the Nocturnes at the Queen's Hall; in May he was present at the first London production of Pelléas et Mélisande, at Covent Garden. In the same year, Debussy was diagnosed with colorectal cancer, from which he was to die nine years later.

Debussy's works began to feature increasingly in concert programmes at home and overseas. In 1910 Gustav Mahler conducted the Nocturnes and Prélude à l'après-midi d'un faune in New York in successive months. In the same year, visiting Budapest, Debussy commented that his works were better known there than in Paris. In 1912 Sergei Diaghilev commissioned a new ballet score, Jeux. That, and the three Images, premiered the following year, were the composer's last orchestral works. Jeux was unfortunate in its timing: two weeks after the premiere, in March 1913, Diaghilev presented the first performance of Stravinsky's The Rite of Spring, a sensational event that monopolised discussion in musical circles, and effectively sidelined Jeux along with Fauré's Pénélope, which had opened a week before.

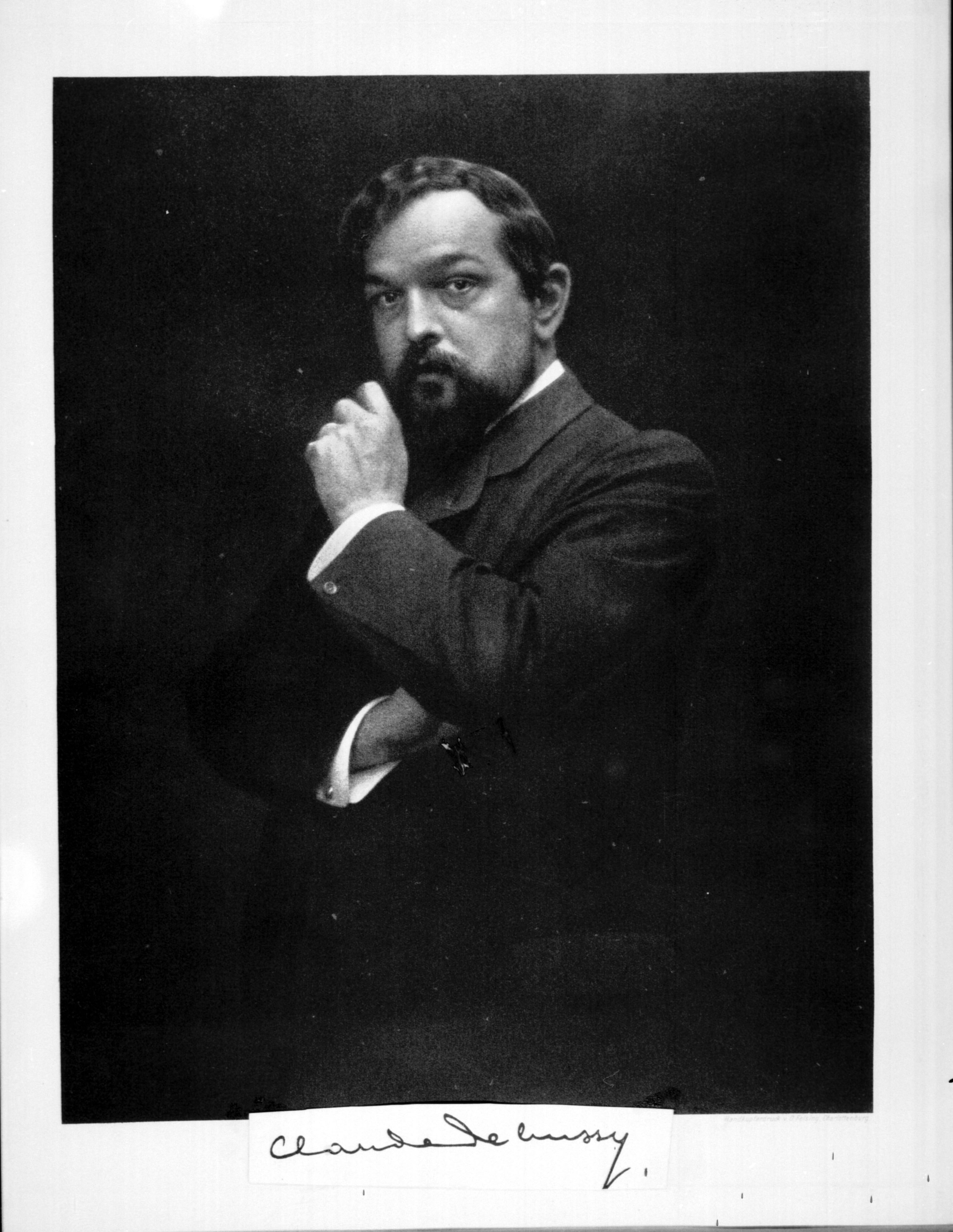
Debussy in 1908

In 1915 Debussy underwent one of the earliest colostomy operations. It achieved only a temporary respite, and occasioned him considerable frustration ("There are mornings when the effort of dressing seems like one of the twelve labours of Hercules"). He also had a fierce enemy at this period in the form of Camille Saint-Saëns, who in a letter to Fauré condemned Debussy's En blanc et noir: "It's incredible, and the door of the Institut [de France] must at all costs be barred against a man capable of such atrocities". Saint-Saëns had been a member of the Institut since 1881: Debussy never became one. His health continued to decline; he gave his final concert on 14 September 1917 and became bedridden in early 1918.

Debussy died of colon cancer on 25 March 1918 at his home, aged 55. The First World War was still raging and Paris was under German aerial and artillery bombardment. The military situation did not permit the honour of a public funeral with ceremonious graveside orations. The funeral procession made its way through deserted streets to a temporary grave at Père Lachaise Cemetery as the German guns bombarded the city. Debussy's body was reinterred the following year in the small Passy Cemetery sequestered behind the Trocadéro, fulfilling his wish to rest "among the trees and the birds"; his wife and daughter are buried with him.

== Works ==
In a survey of Debussy's oeuvre shortly after the composer's death, the critic Ernest Newman wrote, "It would be hardly too much to say that Debussy spent a third of his life in the discovery of himself, a third in the free and happy realisation of himself, and the final third in the partial, painful loss of himself". Later commentators have rated some of the late works more highly than Newman and other contemporaries did, but much of the music for which Debussy is best known is from the middle years of his career.

The analyst David Cox wrote in 1974 that Debussy, admiring Wagner's attempts to combine all the creative arts, "created a new, instinctive, dreamlike world of music, lyrical and pantheistic, contemplative and objective – a kind of art, in fact, which seemed to reach out into all aspects of experience". In 1988 the composer and scholar Wilfrid Mellers wrote of Debussy:

Because of, rather than in spite of, his preoccupation with chords in themselves, he deprived music of the sense of harmonic progression, broke down three centuries' dominance of harmonic tonality, and showed how the melodic conceptions of tonality typical of primitive folk-music and of medieval music might be relevant to the twentieth century

Debussy did not give his works opus numbers, apart from his String Quartet, Op. 10 in G minor (also the only work where the composer's title included a key). His works were catalogued and indexed by the musicologist François Lesure in 1977 (revised in 2003) and their Lesure number ("L" followed by a number) is sometimes used as a suffix to their title in concert programmes and recordings.

=== Early works, 1879–1892 ===
Clair de Lune (5:04)
Composed in 1890, performed by Laurens Goedhart in 2011

Première Arabesque (4:53)

Deuxième Arabesque (4:00)
Both arabesques performed in 2016 by Patrizia Prati

Debussy's musical development was slow, and as a student he was adept enough to produce for his teachers at the Conservatoire works that would conform to their conservative precepts. His friend Georges Jean-Aubry commented that Debussy "admirably imitated Massenet's melodic turns of phrase" in the cantata L'enfant prodigue (1884) which won him the Prix de Rome. A more characteristically Debussian work from his early years is La Damoiselle élue, recasting the traditional form for oratorios and cantatas, using a chamber orchestra and a small body of choral tone and using new or long-neglected scales and harmonies. His early mélodies, inspired by Marie Vasnier, are more virtuosic in character than his later works in the genre, with extensive wordless vocalise; from the Ariettes oubliées (1885–1887) onwards he developed a more restrained style. He wrote his own poems for the Proses lyriques (1892–1893) but, in the view of the musical scholar Robert Orledge, "his literary talents were not on a par with his musical imagination".

The musicologist Jacques-Gabriel Prod'homme wrote that, together with La Demoiselle élue, the Ariettes oubliées and the Cinq poèmes de Charles Baudelaire (1889) show "the new, strange way which the young musician will hereafter follow". Newman concurred: "There is a good deal of Wagner, especially of Tristan, in the idiom. But the work as a whole is distinctive, and the first in which we get a hint of the Debussy we were to know later – the lover of vague outlines, of half-lights, of mysterious consonances and dissonances of colour, the apostle of languor, the exclusivist in thought and in style." During the next few years Debussy developed his personal style, without, at this stage, breaking sharply away from French musical traditions. Much of his music from this period is on a small scale, such as the Two Arabesques, Valse romantique, Suite bergamasque, and the first set of Fêtes galantes. Newman remarked that, like Chopin, the Debussy of this period appears as a liberator from Germanic styles of composition – offering instead "an exquisite, pellucid style" capable of conveying "not only gaiety and whimsicality but emotion of a deeper sort". In a 2004 study, Mark DeVoto comments that Debussy's early works are harmonically no more adventurous than existing music by Fauré; in a 2007 book about the piano works, Margery Halford observes that Two Arabesques (1888–1891) and "Rêverie" (1890) have "the fluidity and warmth of Debussy's later style" but are not harmonically innovative. Halford cites the popular "Clair de Lune" (1890), the third of the four movements of Suite Bergamasque, as a transitional work pointing towards the composer's mature style.

=== Middle works, 1893–1905 ===
Illustration of L'après-midi d'un faune, 1910

Musicians from Debussy's time onwards have regarded Prélude à l'après-midi d'un faune (1894) as his first orchestral masterpiece. Newman considered it "completely original in idea, absolutely personal in style, and logical and coherent from first to last, without a superfluous bar or even a superfluous note"; Pierre Boulez observed, "Modern music was awakened by Prélude à l'après-midi d'un faune". Most of the major works for which Debussy is best known were written between the mid-1890s and the mid-1900s. They include the String Quartet (1893), Pelléas et Mélisande (1893–1902), the Nocturnes for Orchestra (1899) and La mer (1903–1905). The suite Pour le piano (1894–1901) is, in Halford's view, one of the first examples of the mature Debussy as a composer for the piano: "a major landmark ... and an enlargement of the use of piano sonorities".

In the String Quartet (1893), the gamelan sonorities Debussy had heard four years earlier are recalled in the pizzicatos and cross-rhythms of the scherzo. Debussy's biographer Edward Lockspeiser comments that this movement shows the composer's rejection of "the traditional dictum that string instruments should be predominantly lyrical". The work influenced Ravel, whose own String Quartet, written ten years later, has noticeably Debussian features. The academic and journalist Stephen Walsh calls Pelléas et Mélisande (begun 1893, staged 1902) "a key work for the 20th century". The composer Olivier Messiaen was fascinated by its "extraordinary harmonic qualities and ... transparent instrumental texture". The opera is composed in what Alan Blyth describes as a sustained and heightened recitative style, with "sensuous, intimate" vocal lines. It influenced composers as different as Stravinsky and Puccini.

Orledge describes the Nocturnes as exceptionally varied in texture, "ranging from the Musorgskian start of 'Nuages', through the approaching brass band procession in 'Fêtes', to the wordless female chorus in 'Sirènes'". Orledge considers the last a pre-echo of the marine textures of La mer. Estampes for piano (1903) gives impressions of exotic locations, with further echoes of the gamelan in its pentatonic structures. Debussy believed that since Beethoven, the traditional symphonic form had become formulaic, repetitive and obsolete. (Note: He described the symphonies of Schumann and Mendelssohn as "respectful repetition") The three-part, cyclic symphony by César Franck (1888) was more to his liking, and its influence can be found in La mer (1905); this uses a quasi-symphonic form, its three sections making up a giant sonata-form movement with, as Orledge observes, a cyclic theme, in the manner of Franck. The central "Jeux de vagues" section has the function of a symphonic development section leading into the final "Dialogue du vent et de la mer", "a powerful essay in orchestral colour and sonority" (Orledge) which reworks themes from the first movement. The reviews were sharply divided. Some critics thought the treatment less subtle and less mysterious than his previous works, and even a step backward; others praised its "power and charm", its "extraordinary verve and brilliant fantasy", and its strong colours and definite lines.

=== Late works, 1906–1917 ===
Of the later orchestral works, Images (1905–1912) is better known than Jeux (1913). The former follows the tripartite form established in the Nocturnes and La mer, but differs in employing traditional British and French folk tunes, and in making the central movement, "Ibéria", far longer than the outer ones, and subdividing it into three parts, all inspired by scenes from Spanish life. Although considering Images "the pinnacle of Debussy's achievement as a composer for orchestra", Trezise notes a contrary view that the accolade belongs to the ballet score Jeux. The latter failed as a ballet because of what Jann Pasler describes as a banal scenario, and the score was neglected for some years. Recent analysts have found it a link between traditional continuity and thematic growth within a score and the desire to create discontinuity in a way mirrored in later 20th century music. In this piece, Debussy abandoned the whole-tone scale he had often favoured previously in favour of the octatonic scale with what the Debussy scholar François Lesure describes as its tonal ambiguities.

Pieces from first book of Préludes (1909–1910)
La fille aux cheveux de lin
Performed by Mike Ambrose

La cathédrale engloutie
Performed by Ivan Ilic

Among the late piano works are two books of Préludes (1909–10, 1911–13), short pieces that depict a wide range of subjects. Lesure comments that they range from the frolics of minstrels at Eastbourne in 1905 and the American acrobat "General Lavine" "to dead leaves and the sounds and scents of the evening air". En blanc et noir (In white and black, 1915), a three-movement work for two pianos, is a predominantly sombre piece, reflecting the war and national danger. The Études (1915) for piano have divided opinion. Writing soon after Debussy's death, Newman found them laboured – "a strange last chapter in a great artist's life"; Lesure, writing eighty years later, rates them among Debussy's greatest late works: "Behind a pedagogic exterior, these 12 pieces explore abstract intervals, or – in the last five – the sonorities and timbres peculiar to the piano." In 1914 Debussy started work on a planned set of six sonatas for various instruments. His fatal illness prevented him from completing the set, but those for cello and piano (1915), flute, viola and harp (1915), and violin and piano (1917 – his last completed work) are all concise, three-movement pieces, more diatonic in nature than some of his other late works.

Le Martyre de saint Sébastien (1911), originally a five-act musical play to a text by Gabriele D'Annunzio that took nearly five hours in performance, was not a success, and the music is now more often heard in a concert (or studio) adaptation with narrator, or as an orchestral suite of "Fragments symphoniques". Debussy enlisted the help of André Caplet in orchestrating and arranging the score. Two late stage works, the ballets Khamma (1912) and La boîte à joujoux (1913), were left with the orchestration incomplete, and were completed by Charles Koechlin and Caplet, respectively.

== Style ==
=== Debussy and Impressionism ===
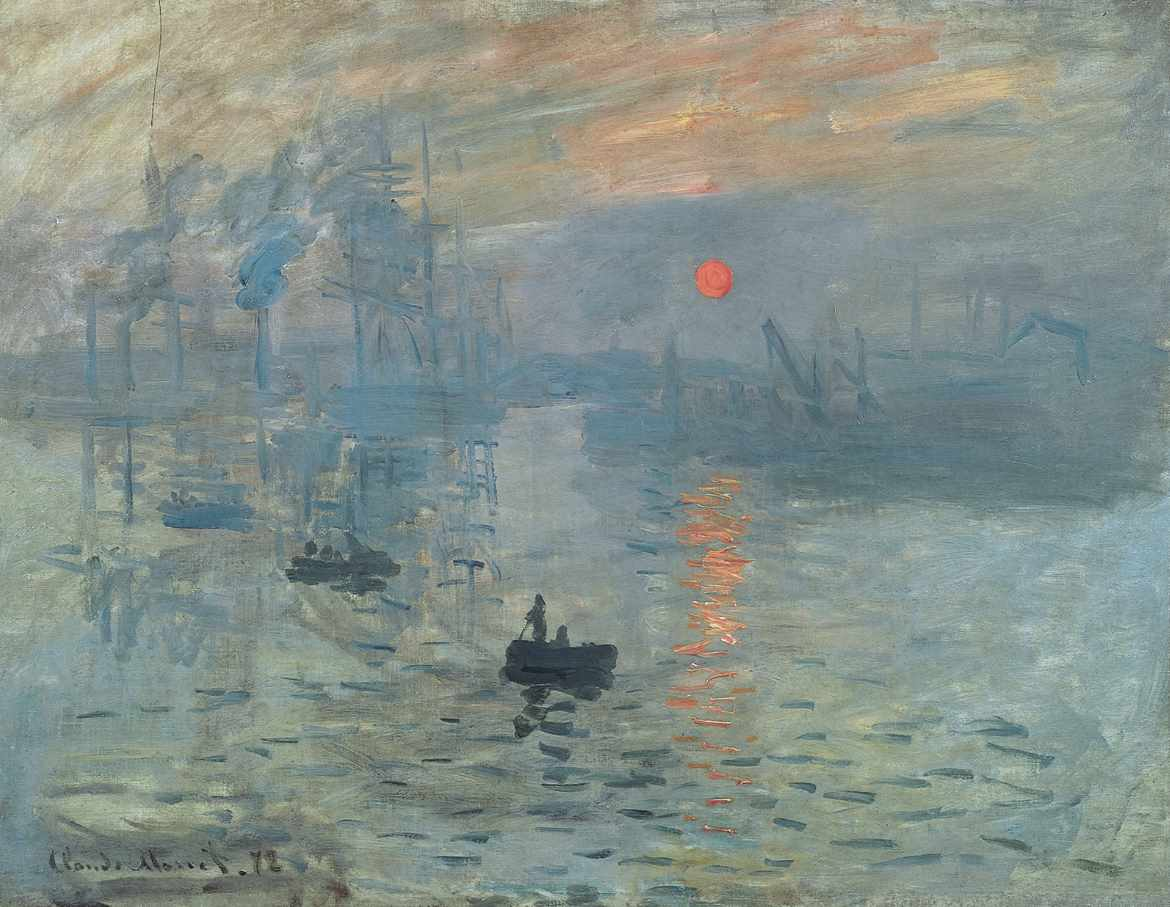
Monet's Impression, soleil levant (1872), from which "Impressionism" takes its name

The application of the term "Impressionist" to Debussy and the music he influenced has been much debated, both during his lifetime and since. The analyst Richard Langham Smith writes that Impressionism was originally a term coined to describe a style of late 19th-century French painting, typically scenes suffused with reflected light in which the emphasis is on the overall impression rather than outline or clarity of detail, as in works by Monet, Pissarro, Renoir and others. Langham Smith writes that the term became transferred to the compositions of Debussy and others which were "concerned with the representation of landscape or natural phenomena, particularly the water and light imagery dear to Impressionists, through subtle textures suffused with instrumental colour".

Among painters, Debussy particularly admired Turner, but also drew inspiration from Whistler. With the latter in mind the composer wrote to the violinist Eugène Ysaÿe in 1894 describing the orchestral Nocturnes as "an experiment in the different combinations that can be obtained from one colour – what a study in grey would be in painting."

Debussy strongly objected to the use of the word "Impressionism" for his (or anybody else's) music, (Note: In a letter of 1908 he wrote: "I am trying to do 'something different' – an effect of reality ... what the imbeciles call 'impressionism', a term which is as poorly used as possible, particularly by the critics, since they do not hesitate to apply it to [J.M.W.] Turner, the finest creator of mysterious effects in all the world of art.") but it has continually been attached to him since the assessors at the Conservatoire first applied it, opprobriously, to his early work Printemps. Langham Smith comments that Debussy wrote many piano pieces with titles evocative of nature – "Reflets dans l'eau" (1905), "Les Sons et les parfums tournent dans l'air du soir" (1910) and "Brouillards" (1913) (Note: Respectively, Reflections in the Water, Sounds and Perfumes Swirl in the Evening Air, and Mists.) – and suggests that the Impressionist painters' use of brush-strokes and dots is paralleled in the music of Debussy. Although Debussy said that anyone using the term (whether about painting or music) was an imbecile, some Debussy scholars have taken a less absolutist line. Lockspeiser calls La mer "the greatest example of an orchestral Impressionist work", and more recently in The Cambridge Companion to Debussy Nigel Simeone comments, "It does not seem unduly far-fetched to see a parallel in Monet's seascapes". (Note: Roy Howat writes that Debussy, like Fauré, "often juxtaposes the same basic material in different modes or with a strategically shifted bass" which, Howat suggests, is "arguably his most literal approach to true Impressionist technique, the equivalent of Monet's fixed object (be it cathedral or haystack) illuminated from different angles".)

In this context may be placed Debussy's pantheistic eulogy to Nature, in a 1911 interview with Henry Malherbe:

I have made mysterious Nature my religion ... When I gaze at a sunset sky and spend hours contemplating its marvellous ever-changing beauty, an extraordinary emotion overwhelms me. Nature in all its vastness is truthfully reflected in my sincere though feeble soul. Around me are the trees stretching up their branches to the skies, the perfumed flowers gladdening the meadow, the gentle grass-carpeted earth, ... and my hands unconsciously assume an attitude of adoration.

In contrast to the "impressionistic" characterisation of Debussy's music, several writers have suggested that he structured at least some of his music on rigorous mathematical lines. In 1983 the pianist and scholar Roy Howat published a book contending that certain of Debussy's works are proportioned using mathematical models, even while using an apparent classical structure such as sonata form. Howat suggests that some of Debussy's pieces can be divided into sections that reflect the golden ratio, which is approximated by ratios of consecutive numbers in the Fibonacci sequence. Simon Trezise, in his 1994 book Debussy: La Mer, finds the intrinsic evidence "remarkable", with the caveat that no written or reported evidence suggests that Debussy deliberately sought such proportions. Lesure takes a similar view, endorsing Howat's conclusions while not taking a view on Debussy's conscious intentions.

=== Musical idiom ===
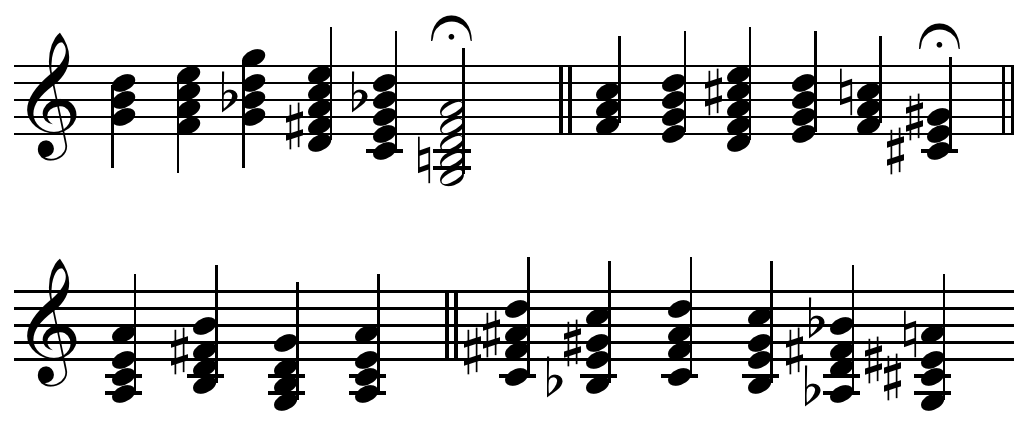
Improvised chord sequences played by Debussy for Guiraud

Debussy wrote "We must agree that the beauty of a work of art will always remain a mystery [...] we can never be absolutely sure 'how it's made.' We must at all costs preserve this magic which is peculiar to music and to which music, by its nature, is of all the arts the most receptive."

Nevertheless, there are many indicators of the sources and elements of Debussy's idiom. Writing in 1958, the critic Rudolph Reti summarised six features of Debussy's music, which he asserted "established a new concept of tonality in European music": the frequent use of lengthy pedal points – "not merely bass pedals in the actual sense of the term, but sustained 'pedals' in any voice"; glittering passages and webs of figurations which distract from occasional absence of tonality; frequent use of parallel chords which are "in essence not harmonies at all, but rather 'chordal melodies', enriched unisons", described by some writers as non-functional harmonies; bitonality, or at least bitonal chords; use of the whole-tone and pentatonic scales; and unprepared modulations, "without any harmonic bridge". Reti concludes that Debussy's achievement was the synthesis of monophonic based "melodic tonality" with harmonies, albeit different from those of "harmonic tonality".

In 1889, Debussy held conversations with his former teacher Guiraud, which included exploration of harmonic possibilities at the piano. The discussion, and Debussy's chordal keyboard improvisations, were noted by a younger pupil of Guiraud, Maurice Emmanuel. The chord sequences played by Debussy include some of the elements identified by Reti. They may also indicate the influence on Debussy of Satie's 1887 Trois Sarabandes. A further improvisation by Debussy during this conversation included a sequence of whole tone harmonies which may have been inspired by the music of Glinka or Rimsky-Korsakov which was becoming known in Paris at this time. During the conversation, Debussy told Guiraud, "There is no theory. You have only to listen. Pleasure is the law!" – although he also conceded, "I feel free because I have been through the mill, and I don't write in the fugal style because I know it."

== Influences ==
=== Musical ===
"Chabrier, Moussorgsky, Palestrina, voilà ce que j'aime" – they are what I love.

— Debussy in 1893

Among French predecessors, Chabrier was an important influence on Debussy (as he was on Ravel and Poulenc); Howat has written that Chabrier's piano music such as "Sous-bois" and "Mauresque" in the Pièces pittoresques explored new sound-worlds of which Debussy made effective use 30 years later. Lesure finds traces of Gounod and Massenet in some of Debussy's early songs, and remarks that it may have been from the Russians – Tchaikovsky, Balakirev, Rimsky-Korsakov, Borodin and Mussorgsky – that Debussy acquired his taste for "ancient and oriental modes and for vivid colorations, and a certain disdain for academic rules". Lesure also considers that Mussorgsky's opera Boris Godunov directly influenced Debussy's Pelléas et Mélisande. In the music of Palestrina, Debussy found what he called "a perfect whiteness", and he felt that although Palestrina's musical forms had a "strict manner", they were more to his taste than the rigid rules prevailing among 19th-century French composers and teachers. He drew inspiration from what he called Palestrina's "harmony created by melody", finding an arabesque-like quality in the melodic lines.

Debussy opined that Chopin was "the greatest of them all, for through the piano he discovered everything"; he professed his "respectful gratitude" for Chopin's piano music. He was torn between dedicating his own Études to Chopin or to François Couperin, whom he also admired as a model of form, seeing himself as heir to their mastery of the genre. Howat cautions against the assumption that Debussy's Ballade (1891) and Nocturne (1892) are influenced by Chopin – in Howat's view they owe more to Debussy's early Russian models – but Chopin's influence is found in other early works such as the Two arabesques (1889–1891). In 1914 the publisher A. Durand & fils began publishing scholarly new editions of the works of major composers, and Debussy undertook the supervision of the editing of Chopin's music. (Note: Debussy examined some existing editions, and chose to base his on that of Ignaz Friedman. He wrote to Durand: "In Friedmann's [sic] preface (Breitkopf Edition, which is quite superior to the Peters), Chopin's influence on Wagner is indicated for the first time".)

Although Debussy was in no doubt of Wagner's stature, he was only briefly influenced by him in his compositions, after La damoiselle élue and the Cinq poèmes de Baudelaire (both begun in 1887). According to Pierre Louÿs, Debussy "did not see 'what anyone can do beyond Tristan'," although he admitted that it was sometimes difficult to avoid "the ghost of old Klingsor, alias Richard Wagner, appearing at the turning of a bar". After Debussy's short Wagnerian phase, he started to become interested in non-Western music and its unfamiliar approaches to composition. The piano piece "Golliwogg's Cakewalk", from the 1908 suite Children's Corner, contains a parody of music from the introduction to Tristan, in which, in the opinion of the musicologist Lawrence Kramer, Debussy escapes the shadow of the older composer and "smilingly relativizes Wagner into insignificance".

A contemporary influence was Erik Satie, according to Nichols Debussy's "most faithful friend" amongst French musicians. Debussy's orchestration in 1896 of Satie's Gymnopédies (which had been written in 1887) "put their composer on the map" according to the musicologist Richard Taruskin, and the Sarabande from Debussy's Pour le piano (1901) "shows that [Debussy] knew Satie's Trois Sarabandes at a time when only a personal friend of the composer could have known them." (They were not published until 1911). Debussy's interest in the popular music of his time is evidenced not only by the Golliwogg's Cakewalk and other piano pieces featuring rag-time, such as The Little Nigar (Debussy's spelling) (1909), but by the slow waltz La plus que lente (The more than slow), based on the style of the gipsy violinist at a Paris hotel (to whom he gave the manuscript of the piece).

In addition to the composers who influenced his own compositions, Debussy held strong views about several others. He was for the most part enthusiastic about Richard Strauss and Stravinsky, respectful of Mozart and was in awe of Bach, whom he called the "good God of music" (le Bon Dieu de la musique). (Note: He remarked to a colleague that if Wagner, Mozart and Beethoven could come to his door and ask him to play Pelléas to them, he would gladly do so, but if it were Bach, he would be too in awe to dare.) His relationship to Beethoven was complex; he was said to refer to him as le vieux sourd ('the old deaf one') and asked one young pupil not to play Beethoven's music for "it is like somebody dancing on my grave;" but he believed that Beethoven had profound things to say, yet did not know how to say them, "because he was imprisoned in a web of incessant restatement and of German aggressiveness." He was not in sympathy with Schubert, Schumann, Brahms and Mendelssohn, the latter being described as a "facile and elegant notary".

With the advent of the First World War, Debussy became ardently patriotic in his musical opinions. Writing to Stravinsky, he asked "How could we not have foreseen that these men were plotting the destruction of our art, just as they had planned the destruction of our country?" In 1915 he complained that "since Rameau we have had no purely French tradition [...] We tolerated overblown orchestras, tortuous forms [...] we were about to give the seal of approval to even more suspect naturalizations when the sound of gunfire put a sudden stop to it all." Taruskin writes that some have seen this as a reference to the composers Gustav Mahler and Arnold Schoenberg, both born Jewish. In 1912 Debussy had remarked to his publisher of the opera Ariane et Barbe-bleue by the (also Jewish) composer Paul Dukas, "You're right, [it] is a masterpiece – but it's not a masterpiece of French music." On the other hand, Charles Rosen argued in a review of Taruskin's work that Debussy was instead implying "that [Dukas's] opera was too Wagnerian, too German, to fit his ideal of French style", citing Georges Liébert, one of the editors of Debussy's collected correspondence, as an authority, saying that Debussy was not antisemitic.

=== Literary ===
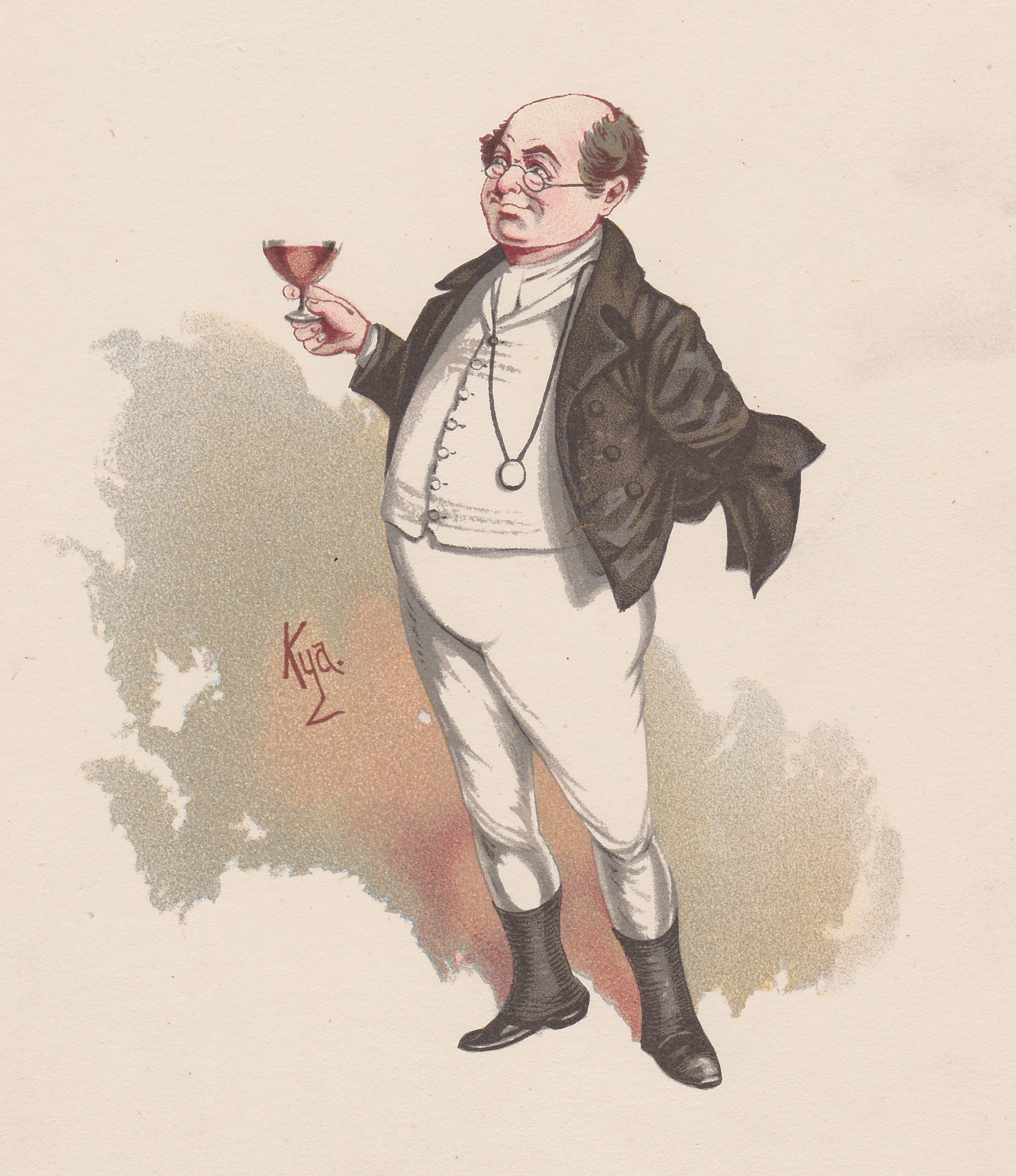
S. Pickwick Esq. P.P.M.P.C.

Despite his lack of formal schooling, Debussy read widely and found inspiration in literature. Lesure writes, "The development of free verse in poetry and the disappearance of the subject or model in painting influenced him to think about issues of musical form." Debussy was influenced by the Symbolist poets. These writers, who included Verlaine, Mallarmé, Maeterlinck and Rimbaud, reacted against the realism, naturalism, objectivity and formal conservatism that prevailed in the 1870s. They favoured poetry using suggestion rather than direct statement; the literary scholar Chris Baldrick writes that they evoked "subjective moods through the use of private symbols, while avoiding the description of external reality or the expression of opinion". Debussy was much in sympathy with the Symbolists' desire to bring poetry closer to music, became friendly with several leading exponents, and set many Symbolist works throughout his career.

Debussy's literary inspirations were mostly French, but he did not overlook foreign writers. As well as Maeterlinck for Pelléas et Mélisande, he drew on Shakespeare and Dickens for two of his Préludes for piano – "La Danse de Puck" (Book 1, 1910) and "Hommage à S. Pickwick Esq. P.P.M.P.C." (Book 2, 1913). He set Dante Gabriel Rossetti's The Blessed Damozel in his early cantata, La Damoiselle élue (1888). He wrote incidental music for King Lear and planned an opera based on As You Like It, but abandoned that once he turned his attention to setting Maeterlinck's play. In 1890 he began work on an orchestral piece inspired by Edgar Allan Poe's The Fall of the House of Usher and later sketched the libretto for an opera, La chute de la maison Usher. Another project inspired by Poe – an operatic version of The Devil in the Belfry did not progress beyond sketches. French writers whose words he set include Paul Bourget, Alfred de Musset, Théodore de Banville, Leconte de Lisle, Théophile Gautier, Paul Verlaine, François Villon, and Mallarmé – the last of whom also provided Debussy with the inspiration for one of his most popular orchestral pieces, Prélude à l'après-midi d'un faune.

== Influence on later composers ==
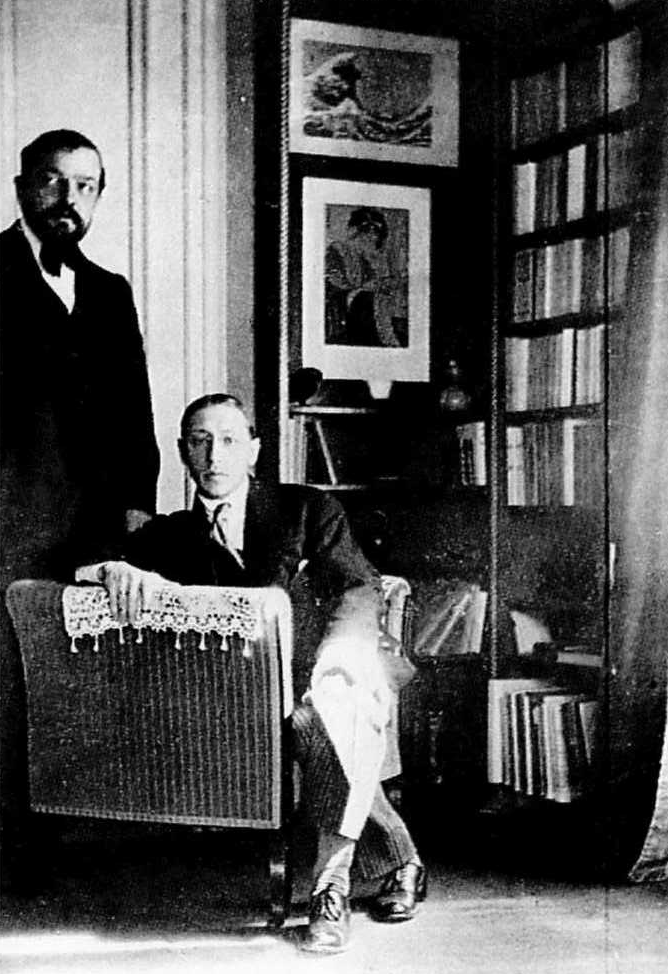
Debussy with Igor Stravinsky: photograph by Erik Satie, June 1910, taken at Debussy's home in the Avenue du Bois de Boulogne

Debussy is widely regarded as one of the most influential composers of the 20th century. Roger Nichols writes that "if one omits Schoenberg ... a list of 20th-century composers influenced by Debussy is practically a list of 20th-century composers tout court."

Bartók first encountered Debussy's music in 1907 and later said that "Debussy's great service to music was to reawaken among all musicians an awareness of harmony and its possibilities". Not only Debussy's use of whole-tone scales, but also his style of word-setting in Pelléas et Mélisande, were the subject of study by Leoš Janáček while he was writing his 1921 opera Káťa Kabanová. Stravinsky was more ambivalent about Debussy's music (he thought Pelléas "a terrible bore ... in spite of many wonderful pages") but the two composers knew each other and Stravinsky's Symphonies of Wind Instruments (1920) was written as a memorial for Debussy.

In the aftermath of the First World War, the young French composers of Les Six reacted against what they saw as the poetic, mystical quality of Debussy's music in favour of something more hard-edged. Their sympathiser and self-appointed spokesman Jean Cocteau wrote in 1918: "Enough of nuages, waves, aquariums, ondines and nocturnal perfumes," pointedly alluding to the titles of pieces by Debussy. Later generations of French composers had a much more positive relationship with his music. Messiaen was given a score of Pelléas et Mélisande as a boy and said that it was "a revelation, love at first sight" and "probably the most decisive influence I have been subject to". Boulez also discovered Debussy's music at a young age and said that it gave him his first sense of what modernity in music could mean.

Among contemporary composers George Benjamin has described Prélude à l'après-midi d'un faune as "the definition of perfection"; he has conducted Pelléas et Mélisande and the critic Rupert Christiansen detects the influence of the work in Benjamin's opera Written on Skin (2012). Others have made orchestrations of some of the piano and vocal works, including John Adams's version of four of the Baudelaire songs (Le Livre de Baudelaire, 1994), Robin Holloway's of En blanc et noir (2002), and Colin Matthews's of both books of Préludes (2001–2006).

The pianist Stephen Hough believes that Debussy's influence also extends to jazz and suggests that Reflets dans l'eau can be heard in the harmonies of Bill Evans. (Note: In addition to Bill Evans, other jazz musicians influenced by Debussy include Herbie Hancock, and McCoy Tyner, according to an article in Jazz Education in Research and Practice.)

== Recordings ==
In 1904, Debussy played the piano accompaniment for Mary Garden in recordings for the Compagnie française du Gramophone of four of his songs: three mélodies from the Verlaine cycle Ariettes oubliées – "Il pleure dans mon coeur", "L'ombre des arbres" and "Green" – and "Mes longs cheveux", from Act III of Pelléas et Mélisande. He made a set of piano rolls for the Welte-Mignon company in 1913. They contain fourteen of his pieces: "D'un cahier d'esquisses", "La plus que lente", "La soirée dans Grenade", all six movements of Children's Corner, and five of the Preludes: "Danseuses de Delphes", "Le vent dans la plaine", "La cathédrale engloutie", "La danse de Puck" and "Minstrels". The 1904 and 1913 sets have been transferred to compact disc.

Contemporaries of Debussy who made recordings of his music included the pianists Ricardo Viñes (in "Poissons d'or" from Images and "La soirée dans Grenade" from Estampes); Alfred Cortot (numerous solo pieces as well as the Violin Sonata with Jacques Thibaud and the Chansons de Bilitis with Maggie Teyte); and Marguerite Long ("Jardins sous la pluie" and "Arabesques"). Singers in Debussy's mélodies or excerpts from Pelléas et Mélisande included Jane Bathori, Claire Croiza, Charles Panzéra and Ninon Vallin; and among the conductors in the major orchestral works were Ernest Ansermet, Désiré-Émile Inghelbrecht, Pierre Monteux and Arturo Toscanini, and in the Petite Suite, Henri Büsser, who had prepared the orchestration for Debussy. Many of these early recordings have been reissued on CD.

In more recent times Debussy's output has been extensively recorded. In 2018, to mark the centenary of the composer's death, Warner Classics, with contributions from other companies, issued a 33-CD set that is claimed to include all the music Debussy wrote.

== Notes, references and sources ==
=== Sources ===
- Barraqué, Jean (1977). Debussy. Paris: Editions du Seuil. ISBN 978-2-02-000242-4.
- Blyth, Alan (1994). Opera on CD. London: Kyle Cathie. ISBN 978-1-85626-103-6.
- Boulez, Pierre (2017). Serrou, Bruno (ed.). Entretiens de Pierre Boulez, 1983–2013, recueillis par Bruno Serrou (in French). Château-Gontier: Éditions Aedam Musicae. ISBN 978-2-919046-34-8.
- Brown, Matthew (2012). Debussy Redux: The Impact of his Music on Popular Culture. Bloomington: Indiana University Press. ISBN 978-0-253-35716-8.
- Cooke, Mervyn (1998). "The East in the West: Evocations of the Gamelan in Western Music". In Bellman, Jonathan (ed.). The Exotic in Western Music. Boston: Northeastern University Press. ISBN 978-1-55553-319-9.
- Cox, David (1974). Debussy Orchestral Music. London: BBC. ISBN 978-0-563-12678-2.
- Debussy, Claude (1962) [1927]. Monsieur Croche the Dilettante Hater. New York: Dover. OCLC 613848806.
- Debussy, Claude (1987). Lesure, François; Nichols, Roger (eds.). Debussy Letters. Translated by Nichols, Roger. Cambridge, Massachusetts: Harvard University Press. ISBN 978-0-674-19429-8.
- DeVoto, Mark (2003). "The Debussy sound: colour, texture, gesture". In Trezise, Simon (ed.). The Cambridge Companion to Debussy. Cambridge: Cambridge University Press. ISBN 978-0-521-65478-4.
- DeVoto, Mark (2004). Debussy and the Veil of Tonality. Hillsdale, New York: Pendragon Press. ISBN 978-1-57647-090-9.
- Dietschy, Marcel (1990). A Portrait of Claude Debussy. Translated by Ashbrook, William; Cobb, Margaret. Oxford and New York: Oxford University Press. ISBN 978-0-19-315469-8.
- Donnellon, Déirdre (2003). "Debussy as musician and critic". In Trezise, Simon (ed.). The Cambridge Companion to Debussy. Cambridge: Cambridge University Press. ISBN 978-0-521-65478-4.
- Dumesnil, Maurice (1979) [1940]. Claude Debussy, Master of Dreams. Westport: Greenwood. ISBN 978-0-313-20775-4.
- Evans, Allan (2009). Ignaz Friedman: Romantic Master Pianist. Bloomington: Indiana University Press. ISBN 978-0-25-335310-8.
- Fulcher, Jane (2001). Debussy and his World. Princeton: Princeton University Press. ISBN 978-1-4008-3195-1.
- Garden, Mary; Biancolli, Louis Leopold (1951). Mary Garden's Story. New York: Simon & Schuster. OCLC 1001487250.
- Gorlinski, Gini, ed. (2009). The 100 Most Influential Musicians of All Time. New York: Britannica Educational Publishing. ISBN 978-1-61530-006-8.
- Halford, Margery (2006). Debussy: An Introduction to his Piano Music. Van Nuys: Alfred. ISBN 978-0-7390-3876-5.
- Hartmann, Arthur (2003). Claude Debussy as I knew him. Rochester, New York: University of Rochester Press. ISBN 978-1-58046-104-7.
- Holloway, Robin (1979). Debussy and Wagner. London: Eulenburg. ISBN 978-0-903873-25-3.
- Holmes, Paul (2010). Debussy. London and New York: Omnibus Press. ISBN 978-0-85712-433-3.
- Howat, Roy (1983). Debussy in Proportion: A Musical Analysis. Cambridge: Cambridge University Press. ISBN 978-0-521-31145-8.
- Howat, Roy (2011). "Russian imprints in Debussy's piano music". In Antokoletz, Elliott; Wheeldon, Marianne (eds.). Rethinking Debussy. New York: Oxford University Press. ISBN 978-0-19-975563-9.
- Jensen, Eric Frederick (2014). Debussy. Oxford: Oxford University Press. ISBN 978-0-19-973005-6.
- Johnson, Graham (2002). A French Song Companion. Oxford and New York: Oxford University Press. ISBN 978-0-19-973005-6.
- Jones, J. Barrie (1979). Debussy. Milton Keynes: Open University. ISBN 978-0-335-05451-0.
- Lesure, François (2019) [translation of 2003 French ed.]. Claude Debussy: A Critical Biography. Translated by Rolf, Marie. Rochester: University of Rochester Press. ISBN 978-1-580-46903-6.
- Lesure, François; Howat, Roy (2001). "Debussy, (Achille-)Claude". Grove Music Online (8th ed.). Oxford University Press. ISBN 978-1-56159-263-0. (subscription, Wikilibrary access, or UK public library membership required)
- Lesure, François; Cain, Julien (1962). Claude Debussy, 1862–1918: Exposition organisée pour commémorer le centenaire de sa naissance (in French). Bordeaux: Ville de Bordeaux. OCLC 557859304.
- Lockspeiser, Edward (1978) [1962]. Debussy: His Life and Mind (Second ed.). Cambridge and New York: Cambridge University Press. ISBN 978-0-521-22054-5.
- McAuliffe, Mary (2014). Twilight of the Belle Epoque: The Paris of Picasso, Stravinsky, Proust, Renault, Marie Curie, Gertrude Stein, and Their Friends through the Great War. Lanham, Maryland: Rowman & Littlefield. ISBN 978-1-4422-2163-5.
- Mellers, Wilfrid (1988). Romanticism and the Twentieth Century. London: Barrie & Jenkins. ISBN 978-0-7126-2050-5.
- Moore Whiting, Stephen (1999). Satie the Bohemian: From Cabaret to Concert Hall. Oxford: Oxford University Press. ISBN 978-0-19-816458-6.
- Moreux, Serge (1953). Béla Bartók. Translated by Fraser, G. S.; Mauny, Erik de. London: The Harvill Press. OCLC 860355.
- Nectoux, Jean-Michel (1991). Gabriel Fauré: A Musical Life. Roger Nichols (trans). Cambridge: Cambridge University Press. ISBN 978-0-52-123524-2.
- Nichols, Roger (1980). "Debussy, (Achille-)Claude". In Sadie, Stanley (ed.). The New Grove Dictionary of Music and Musicians. London: Macmillan. ISBN 978-0-333-23111-1.
- Nichols, Roger (1992). Debussy Remembered. London: Faber & Faber. ISBN 978-0-571-15357-2.
- Nichols, Roger (1998). The Life of Debussy. Cambridge: Cambridge University Press. ISBN 978-0-521-57887-5.
- Nichols, Roger (2011) [1977]. Ravel. New Haven, CN and London: Yale University Press. ISBN 978-0-300-10882-8.
- Orenstein, Arbie (1991) [1975]. Ravel: Man and Musician. Mineola, US: Dover. ISBN 978-0-486-26633-6.
- Orledge, Robert (2003). "Debussy the Man". In Trezise, Simon (ed.). The Cambridge Companion to Debussy. Cambridge: Cambridge University Press. ISBN 978-0-521-65478-4.
- Parris, Matthew (2008). Scorn. London: Little. ISBN 978-1-904435-98-3.
- Potter, Keith (1999). Four Musical Minimalists. Cambridge and New York: Cambridge University Press. ISBN 978-0-521-48250-9.
- Poulenc, Francis (1978). Audel, Stéphane (ed.). My Friends and Myself. Translated by Harding, James. London: Dennis Dobson. ISBN 978-0-234-77251-5.
- Reti, Rudolph (1958). Tonality–Atonality–Pantonality: A Study of Some Trends in Twentieth Century Music. London: Rockliffe. OCLC 470370109.
- Rolf, Marie (2011). "Debussy's Rites of Spring". In Antokoletz, Elliott; Wheeldon, Marianne (eds.). Rethinking Debussy. New York: Oxford University Press. ISBN 978-0-19-975563-9.
- Rosen, Charles (2012). Freedom and the Arts. Cambridge, Mass: Harvard University Press. ISBN 978-0-674-04752-5.
- Ross, Alex (2008). The Rest Is Noise. London: Fourth Estate. ISBN 978-1-84115-475-6.
- Sackville-West, Edward; Shawe-Taylor, Desmond (1955). The Record Guide. London: Collins. OCLC 500373060.
- Samuel, Claude (1976). Conversations with Olivier Messiaen. Translated by Aprahamian, Felix. London: Stainer and Bell. ISBN 978-0-85249-308-3.
- Schmitz, E. Robert (1966) [1950]. The Piano Works of Claude Debussy. New York: Dover Publications. ISBN 978-0-486-17275-0.
- Schonberg, Harold C. (1987). The Great Pianists. New York: Simon & Schuster. ISBN 978-0-671-64200-6.
- Siepmann, Jeremy (1998). The Piano. Wisconsin: Hal Leonard Corp. ISBN 978-0-7935-9976-9.
- Simeone, Nigel (2000). Paris – A Musical Gazetteer. New Haven: Yale University Press. ISBN 978-0-300-08053-7.
- Simeone, Nigel (2003). "Debussy and Expression". In Trezise, Simon (ed.). The Cambridge Companion to Debussy. Cambridge: Cambridge University Press. ISBN 978-0-521-65243-8.
- Simeone, Nigel (2008). "France and the Mediterranean". In Cooke, Mervyn (ed.). The Cambridge Companion to Twentieth-Century Opera. Cambridge: Cambridge University Press. ISBN 978-0-521-78009-4.
- Taruskin, Richard (1996). Stravinsky and the Russian Traditions. Berkeley: University of California Press. ISBN 978-0-520-29348-9.
- Taruskin, Richard (2010). Music in the Early Twentieth Century. Oxford: Oxford University Press. ISBN 978-0-19-538484-0.
- Thompson, Oscar (1940). Debussy, Man and Artist. New York: Tudor Publishing. OCLC 636471036.
- Timbrell, Charles (2003). "Debussy in Performance". In Trezise, Simon (ed.). The Cambridge Companion to Debussy. Cambridge: Cambridge University Press. ISBN 978-0-521-65478-4.
- Trezise, Simon (1994). Debussy: La mer. Cambridge: Cambridge University Press. ISBN 978-0-521-44656-3.
- Trezise, Simon (2003). "Introduction & Debussy's 'rhythmicised time'". In Trezise, Simon (ed.). The Cambridge Companion to Debussy. Cambridge: Cambridge University Press. ISBN 978-0-521-65478-4.
- Vallas, Léon (1933). Claude Debussy: His Life and Works. Translated by O'Brien, Maire; O'Brien, Grace. Oxford: Oxford University Press. OCLC 458329645.
- Walsh, Stephen (1997). "Claude Debussy". In Holden, Amanda (ed.). The Penguin Opera Guide. London: Penguin. ISBN 978-0-14-051385-1.
- Walsh, Stephen (2018). Debussy: A Painter in Sound. London: Faber & Faber. ISBN 978-0-571-33016-4.
- Weintraub, Stanley (2001). Whistler: A Biography. New York: Da Capo Press. ISBN 978-0-306-80971-2.
- Wenk, Arthur (1976). Claude Debussy and the Poets. Berkeley: University of California Press. ISBN 978-0-520-02827-2.
- Wheeldon, Marianne (2009). Debussy's Late Style. Bloomington: Indiana University Press. ISBN 978-0-253-35239-2.
- Wheeldon, Marianne (2011). "Tombeau de Claude Debussy". In Antokoletz, Elliott; Wheeldon, Marianne (eds.). Rethinking Debussy. New York: Oxford University Press. ISBN 978-0-19-975563-9.
- Wheeldon, Marianne (2017). Debussy's Legacy and the Construction of Reputation. New York: Oxford University Press. ISBN 978-0-19-063122-2.
