= Maurice Dumesnil =

French pianist

Maurice Hippolyte Dumesnil (20 April 1884 – 26 August 1974) was a French classical pianist.

== Biography ==
Born in Angoulême, Dumesnil studied the piano at the Conservatoire de Paris with Isidore Philipp, and was a pupil of Claude Debussy. He undertook successful concert tours throughout Europe and America. Starting in 1915, he played in trio with violinist Jules Boucherit and cellist André Hekking. He was a member of the piano management committees at the Paris Conservatory, the École Normale de Musique de Paris and the American Conservatory.

Based in the United States, Dumesnil was married to Evangeline Marie Lehman (1896-1975), a composer.

He also published several books on Debussy's piano music (How to Play and Teach Debussy, Claude Debussy, Master of Dreams, 1940).

Dumesnil died at Highland Park, in Michigan (United States).
