= Nocturnes (Debussy) =

1899 musical work by Claude Debussy

- Orchestral music by Claude Debussy
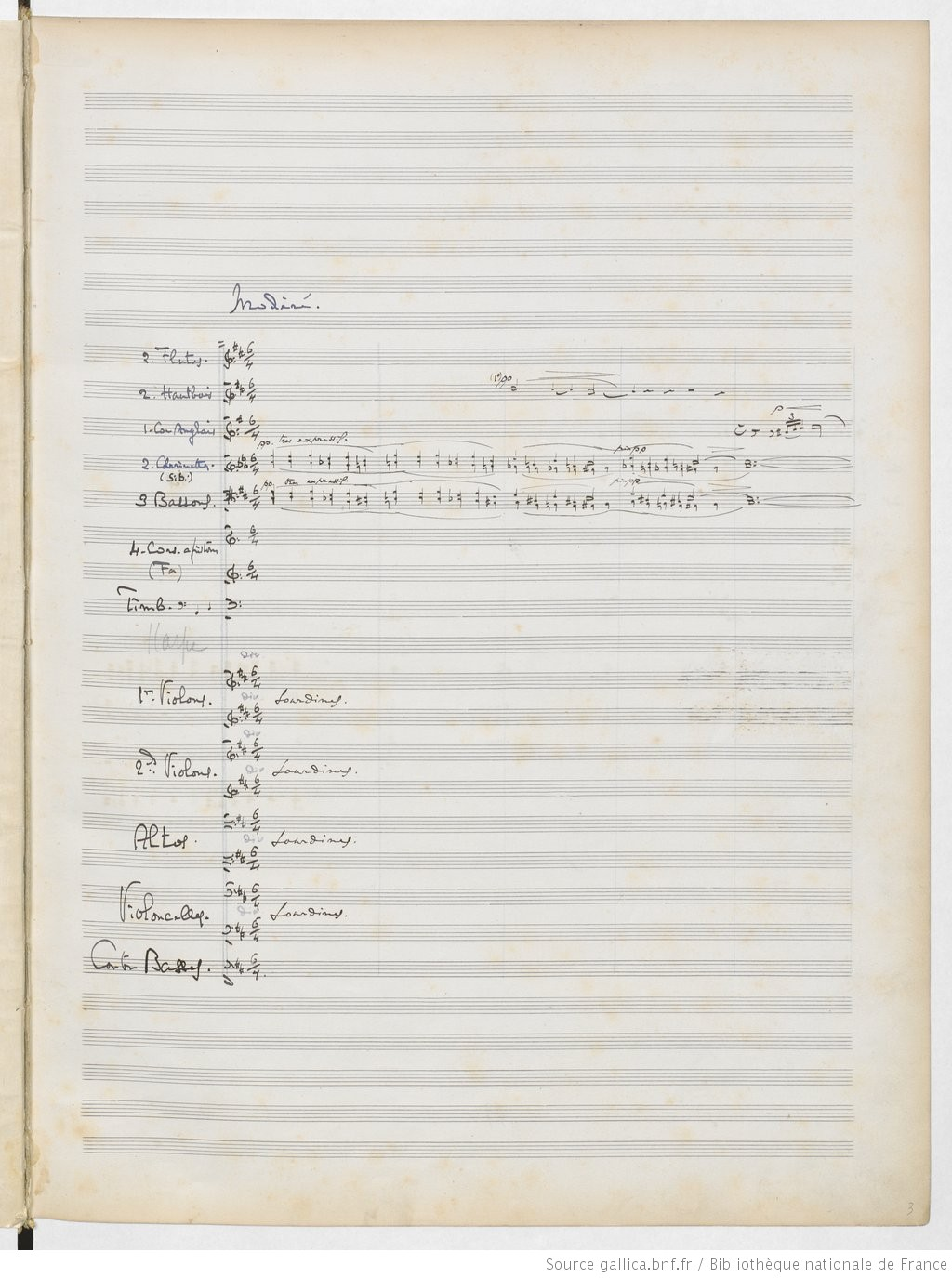
- Original manuscript of the orchestral arrangement
- Catalogue: L 98
- Based on: Poèmes anciens et romanesques by Henri de Régnier; Nocturnes by Whistler
- Composed: 1892–1899
- Dedication: Georges Hartmann (publisher)
- Performed: 9 December 1900 (mvts 1 & 2); 27 October 1901 (all 3 mvts)
- Published: 1900; 1930 (revised version)
- Duration: about 25 minutes
- Movements: I. Nuages ("Clouds"); II. Fêtes ("Festivals"); III. Sirènes ("Sirens")
- Scoring: Orchestra; women's chorus

Nocturnes, L 98 (also known as Trois nocturnes or Three Nocturnes) is an Impressionist orchestral composition in three movements by the French composer Claude Debussy, who wrote it between 1892 and 1899. It is based on poems from Poèmes anciens et romanesques (Henri de Régnier, 1890).

== Composition ==
=== "Three Scenes at Twilight" ===
Based on comments in various Debussy letters and in Léon Vallas's biography, it has generally been assumed that composition of the Nocturnes began in 1892 under the title Trois Scènes au Crépuscule ("Three Scenes at Twilight"), an orchestral triptych. However, the lack of actual manuscripts makes it impossible to determine whether such works were truly related to the Nocturnes.

Trois Scènes au Crépuscule was inspired by ten poems by Henri de Régnier entitled Poèmes anciens et romanesques (published in 1890). Régnier was a symbolist poet, and his poems contain vivid imagery and dreamlike associations of ideas. In a letter to Jacques Durand on 3 September 1907, Debussy writes "I am more and more convinced that music, by its very nature, is something that cannot be cast into a traditional and fixed form. It is made up of colors and rhythms"; he found suitable material in the imagery of these poems.

Debussy may have begun creating the work for an intended performance in New York City, promoted and sponsored by Prince André Poniatowski, a banker and writer, and a confidant to whom Debussy frequently expressed himself in long letters. The New York performance was to consist of the premiere of Debussy's Fantaisie for piano and orchestra completed two years earlier, a rather traditional work in classical form but a tradition which Debussy in the next two years would reject and musically move away from (resulting in the Fantaisie never being performed or published in his lifetime); his experimental oratorio La Damoiselle élue, from four years prior, also still unperformed as yet; and the Twilight Scenes, which Debussy told the prince were "pretty much finished" even though he hadn't put anything on paper yet. The American concert deal fell through.

Debussy was already working with difficulty on his opera Rodrigue et Chimène, a biography of El Cid; it has been said that he eventually destroyed its complete score because he felt he could no longer write "that kind of music" to "that kind of literature", but his biographer says he merely concealed them and they remained in private collections.

He was also working on another orchestral triptych after a cycle of three poems by another symbolist poet, Stéphane Mallarmé, called L'après-midi d'un faune, that was more in keeping with the new style of music and inspiration Debussy was seeking. He had in fact asked Henri de Régnier, a close associate of Mallarmé, to inform the latter of his interest in setting the poems to a new kind of musical impression. Mallarmé was vehemently opposed to juxtaposing poetry and music and was strongly against Debussy's compositional idea. After Mallarmé heard the completed Prélude based on his first poem, however, Debussy had evidently caused him to completely reverse his belief, as he expressed his astonishment in lavishing praise and admiration in a personal letter to the composer.

=== Three Nocturnes for solo violin and partitioned orchestra ===
Meanwhile, Debussy's Scènes au Crépuscule, after Régnier's poetry, were completed in piano score in 1893, but before Debussy had a chance to orchestrate them he attended the premiere performance of his String Quartet in G minor in December, given by the Ysaÿe Quartet led by Belgian violin virtuoso Eugène Ysaÿe. Debussy was impressed and flattered by Ysaÿe's interest in his music and decided to rewrite his Twilight Scenes into a piece for solo violin and orchestra.

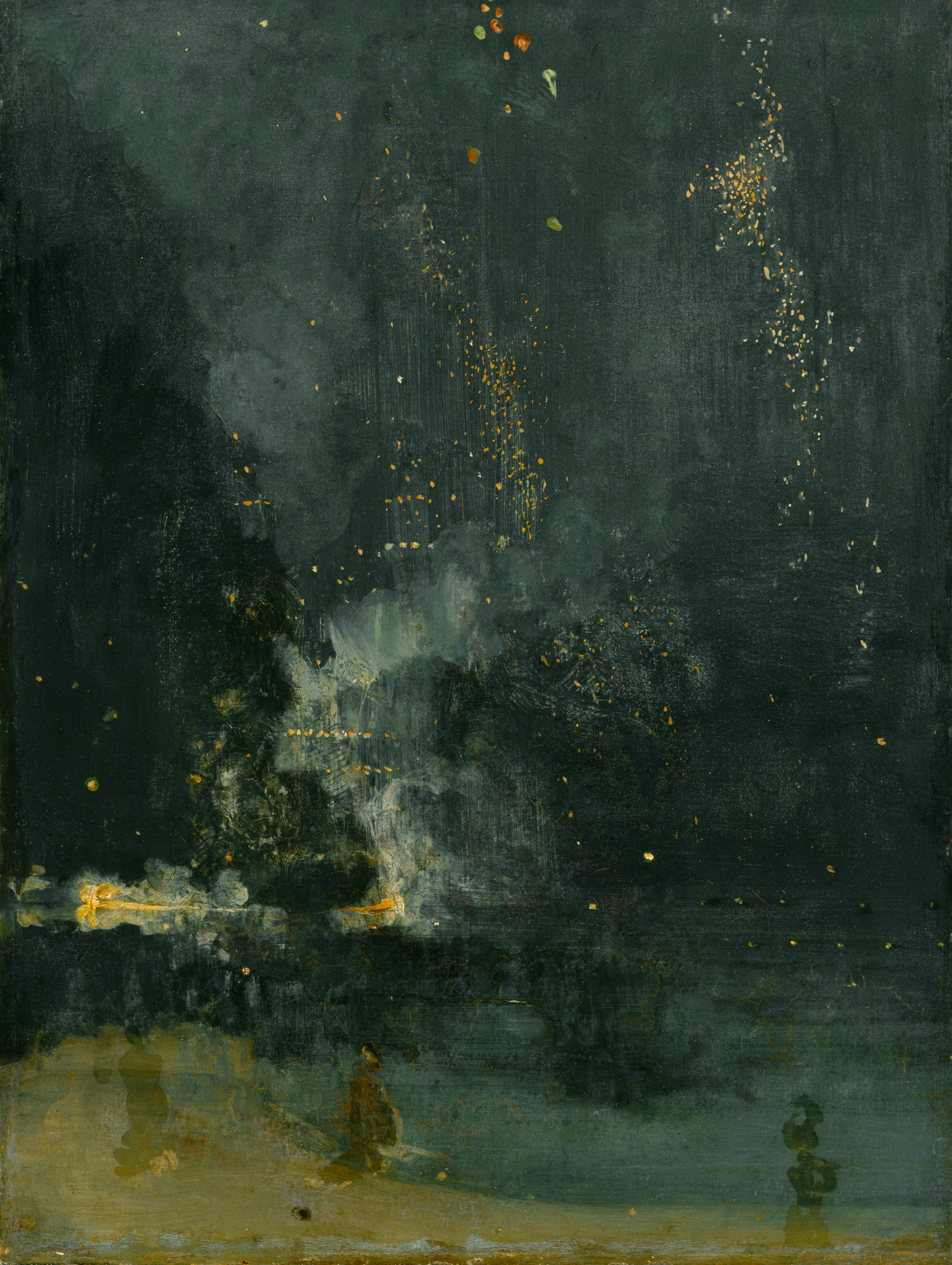
Nocturne in Black and Gold – The Falling Rocket from a series of impressionist paintings by Whistler

In 1894, after completing the first movement of his Mallarmé triptych entitled Prélude (to "The Afternoon of a Faun"), he began the recomposition of the Twilight Scenes in a new inspired style, retitling the new version Nocturnes after a series of paintings of the same name by James McNeill Whistler, who was living in Paris at the time.

In September he described the music to Ysaÿe as "an experiment in the different combinations that can be achieved with one colour—what a study in grey would be in painting". Whistler's most famous painting was a portrait of his mother called Arrangement in Grey and Black No. 1. Debussy scored the orchestral part of the first of the three pieces for strings alone; the second for three flutes, four horns, three trumpets, and two harps; and the third for the two groupings together. The first version of the Nocturnes seems to be the one described; he later abandoned the idea of the solo violin arrangement when he was unable to get Ysaÿe to undertake the performance.

Following the abandonment of Rodrigue et Chimène in 1893, Debussy had immediately begun work on an opera more to his liking, Pelléas et Mélisande, which occupied him with no small measure of trouble over the next nine years, until it premiered on 30 April 1902. Thus it wasn't until 1896 that he informed Ysaÿe that the music for the Nocturnes had pretty much been completed and he still wanted Ysaÿe to perform the solo violin part.

By 1897, Debussy had decided to dispense with a solo violin part and the orchestral groupings, and simply write all three movements for a full orchestra. He worked for the next two years on the Nocturnes, and once confessed to his friend and benefactor, the publisher Georges Hartmann, that he was finding it more difficult to compose these three orchestral nocturnes than a five-act opera. Wanting to equal the sensation caused by the success of "The Afternoon of a Faun" piece, he drove himself toward an over-perfectionism with the Nocturnes. Having worked on the composition for as long as seven years, constantly revising it and changing its very structure several times, he expected it to live up to his own grand, avant-garde views:

I myself love music passionately; and because I love it, I try to set it free from barren traditions that stifle it. It is a free art, gushing forth, an [open-]air art, an art boundless as the elements, the wind, the sky, the sea! It must never be shut in and become an academic art.

— Debussy, in an interview in Comœdia, 1910

=== Completion and further revision ===
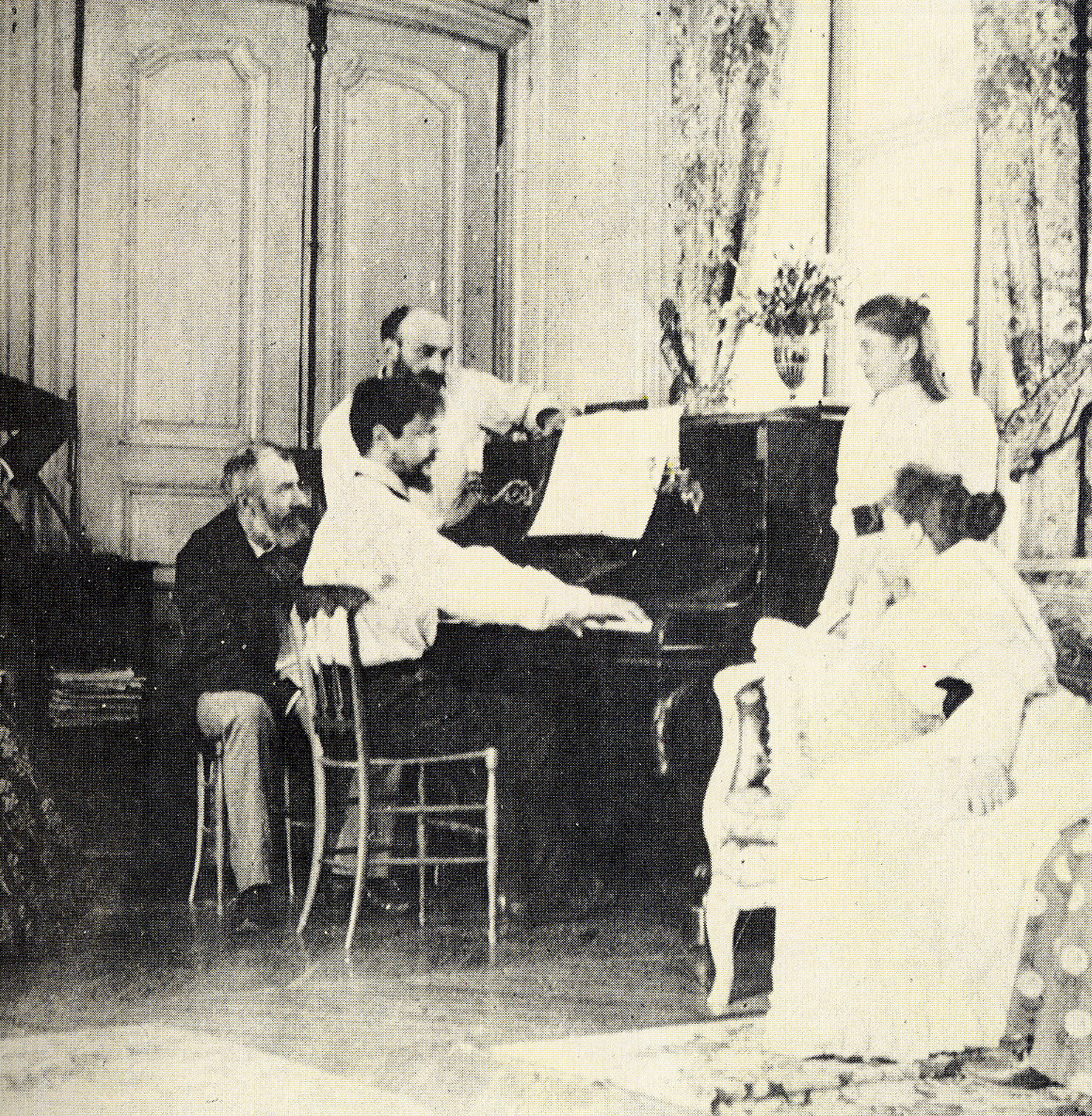
Debussy at the piano in the summer of 1893

A full score of the manuscript of the Nocturnes was signed with the completion date of 15 December 1899. The manuscript bears a dedication to Georges Hartmann, who helped to support Debussy financially beginning in 1894. It was published under contract to Hartmann's publisher, under the Eugène Fromont imprint in 1900. This printed score contained dozens of errors.

The first two movements, Nuages and Fêtes, received their premiere on 9 December 1900 in Paris by the Lamoureux Orchestra conducted by Camille Chevillard. The third movement Sirènes could not be staged because the female choir needed for it was unavailable. The complete work was premiered by the same orchestra and conductor on 27 October 1901. Though these initial performances received a cool response from the public, they were more positively hailed by fellow musicians. A review by Pierre de Bréville in the Mercure de France has been translated as saying: "It is pure music, conceived beyond the limits of reality, in the world of dreams, among the ever-moving architecture that God builds with mists, the marvelous creations of the impalpable realms."

For several years after its publication, almost until the day he died, Debussy continued to tinker with the composition, at first making corrections to dozens of errors in his copy of the published score, then moving on to adjusting small passages and fundamentally revising the orchestration. Debussy made many subtle changes to Sirènes to integrate the wordless singing of the women's chorus with the orchestra. Two of these scores exist with Debussy's changes in different colors of pencils and inks, and often these changes are contradictory or simply alternate versions. As Debussy told conductor Ernest Ansermet when the latter asked which were the right ones: "I'm not really sure; they are all possibilities. Take this score with you and use whatever you like from it."

Debussy continued to modify the composition just as he had for the seven years prior to its publication, sometimes just not satisfied or sometimes thinking of a new experiment in sound, a new color combination of instrumental timbres he hadn't heard yet. Many of these changes were finally incorporated into a "definitive version" published in 1930 by Jobert. This version continues to be performed today.

A comprehensive version addressing many more of Debussy's "possibilities" was published in 1999 by Durand, edited and annotated by Denis Herlin. One reviewer states "in this new critical edition for the Debussy oeuvres complètes, all of the most important questions concerning the establishment of a text of the Nocturnes for practical performance have been confidently answered." Herlin has carefully traced and analyzed four printings of the Nocturnes by Fromont, ending in 1922; multiple scores by Jean Jobert between 1922 and 1930; multiple versions of a heavily revised Jobert score appearing between 1930 and 1964; a 1977 edition by Peters of Leipzig; and a study score from Durand.

The Nocturnes were performed as a ballet in May 1913, with Loie Fuller dancing. The Nocturnes are considered one of Debussy's most accessible and popular works, admired for their beauty and for holding new possibilities and wonder upon repeated hearings.

== Instrumentation ==
The piece has the following instrumentation.

Woodwinds
3 flutes (3rd doubling piccolo)
2 oboes
1 cor anglais
2 clarinets
3 bassoons

Brass
4 horns in F
3 trumpets in F
3 trombones
1 tuba

Percussion
timpani

cymbals
snare drum

Voices
women's chorus (3rd movement only)

Strings
2 harps

1st violins
2nd violins
violas
cellos
double basses

== Music ==
I. Nuages
A computer-generated soundfile of the first movement

There are three movements, each with a descriptive title.

1. Nuages ("Clouds")
2. Fêtes ("Festivals")
3. Sirènes ("Sirens")

The entire work lasts approximately 25 minutes.

Debussy wrote an "introductory note" to the Nocturnes and each of the individual movements, printed in the programme for the first complete performance in 1901: "The title 'Nocturnes' is to be interpreted here in a general and, more particularly, in a decorative sense. Therefore, it is not meant to designate the usual form of the Nocturne, but rather all the various impressions and the special effects of light that the word suggests."

=== I. Nuages ===
Theme

Parallel ninth chords

The tempo markings are "Modéré – Un peu animé – Tempo I – Plus lent – Encore plus lent."

According to Debussy, "'Nuages' renders the immutable aspect of the sky and the slow, solemn motion of the clouds, fading away in grey tones lightly tinged with white." Biographer Léon Vallas recorded Debussy's comments on the genesis of this piece:

One day, in stormy weather, as Debussy was crossing the Pont de la Concorde in Paris with his friend Paul Poujaud, he told him that on a similar kind of day the idea of the symphonic work "Clouds" had occurred to him: he had visualized those very thunderclouds swept along by a stormy wind; a boat passing, with its horn sounding. These two impressions are recalled in the languorous succession of chords and by the short chromatic theme on the English horn.

=== II. Fêtes ===
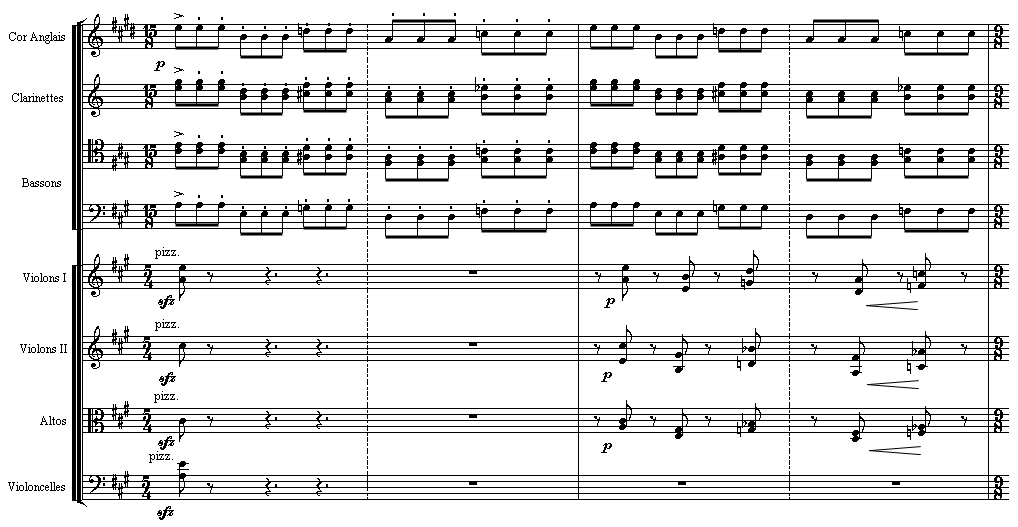
Fêtes uses 15/8 time (shown subdivided into 9/8 and 6/8)

The tempo markings are "Animé et très rythmé – Un peu plus animé – Modéré mais toujours très rythmé – Tempo I – De plus en plus sonore et en serrant le mouvement – Même Mouvement."

According to Debussy:

"Fêtes" gives the vibrating, dancing rhythm of the atmosphere with sudden flashes of light. There is also the episode of the procession (a dazzling fantastic vision), which passes through the festive scene and becomes merged in it. But the background remains resistantly the same: the festival with its blending of music and luminous dust participating in the cosmic rhythm.

Léon Vallas, in his biography, continues:

Debussy went on to explain to Poujaud that "Festivals" had been inspired by a recollection of merry-making in the Bois de Boulogne, with noisy crowds watching the drum and bugle corps of the Garde Nationale pass in parade.

=== III. Sirènes ===
The tempo markings are "Modérément animé – Un peu plus lent – En animant surtout dans l'expression – Revenir progressivement au Tempo I – En augmentant peu à peu – Tempo I – Plus lent et en retenant jusqu'à la fin."

According to Debussy, "'Sirènes' depicts the sea and its countless rhythms and presently, amongst the waves silvered by the moonlight, is heard the mysterious song of the Sirens as they laugh and pass on.

== Whistler and Debussy ==
The title, Nocturnes, refers not to the musical tradition of the same name but to the "nocturne" paintings of Whistler, who in turn had borrowed the term from music. Debussy's description of the Sirens movement reminded his biographer Léon Vallas of Whistler's "Harmonies in blue and silver". Vallas noted that Whistler "was a favourite with Debussy, and their art has often been compared." The two were mutual influences, with Whistler borrowing from musical vocabulary to name his pictures, while Debussy did something similar in reverse.

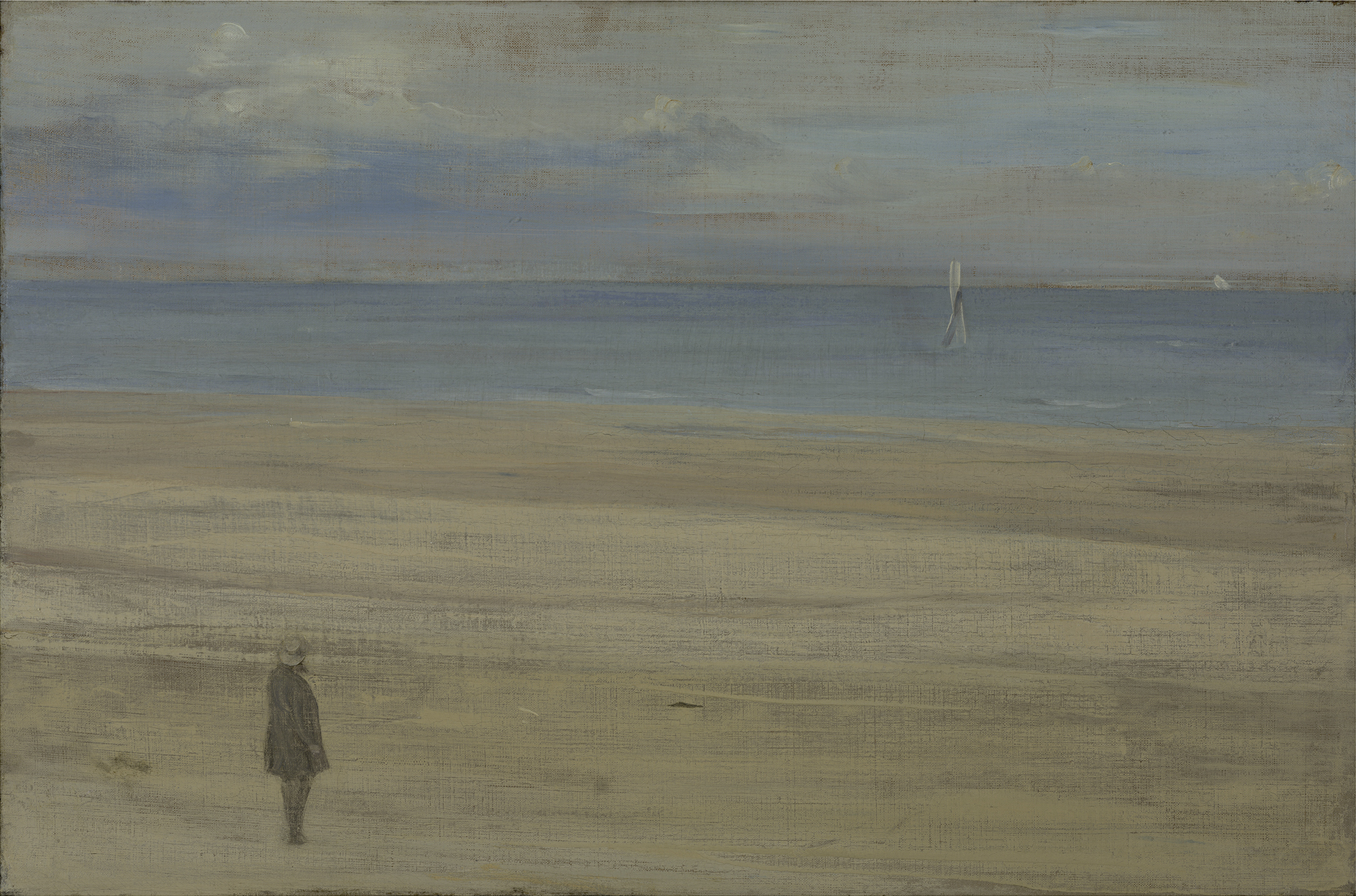
Harmony in blue and silver: Trouville

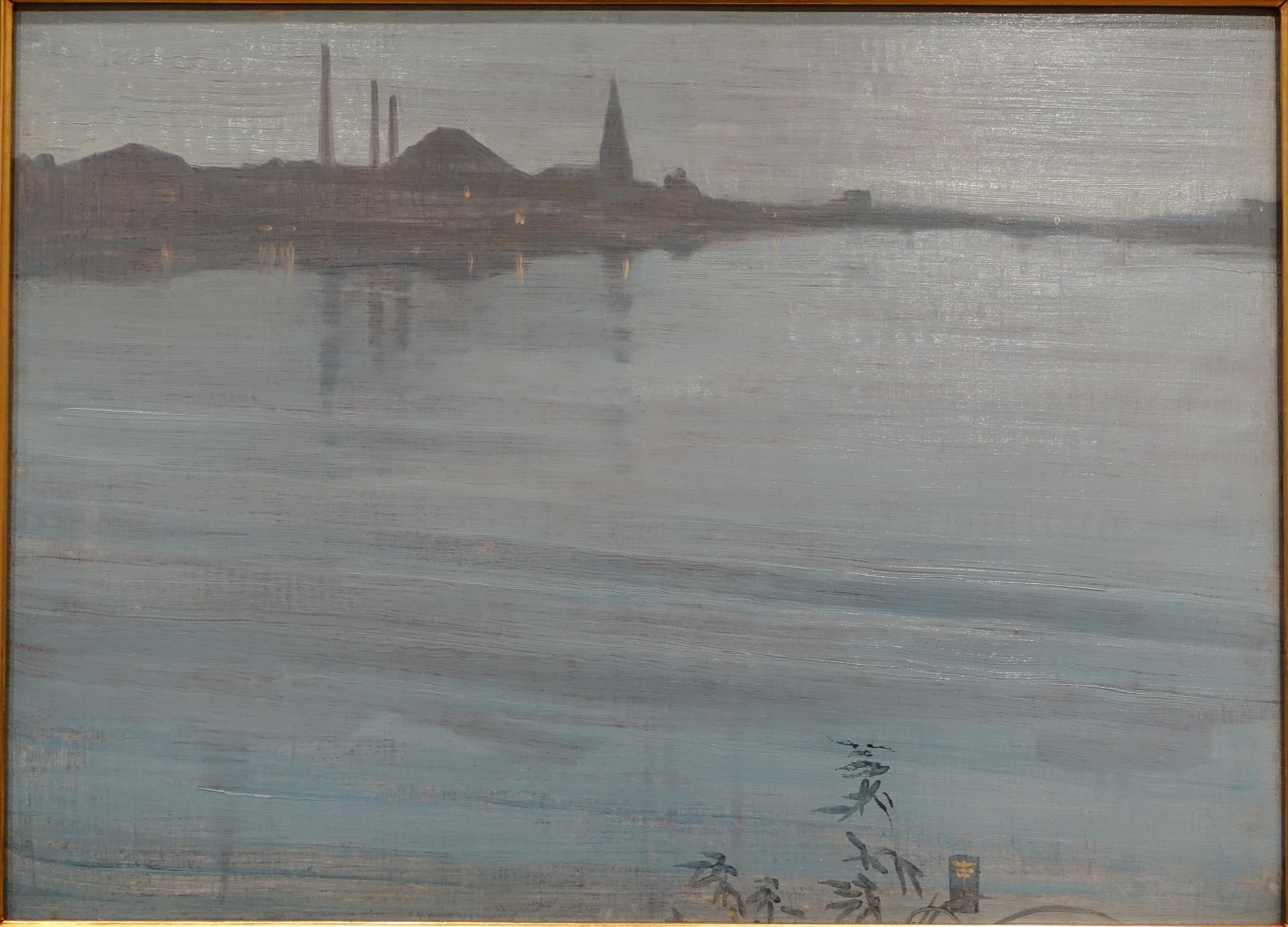
Nocturne: Blue and Silver

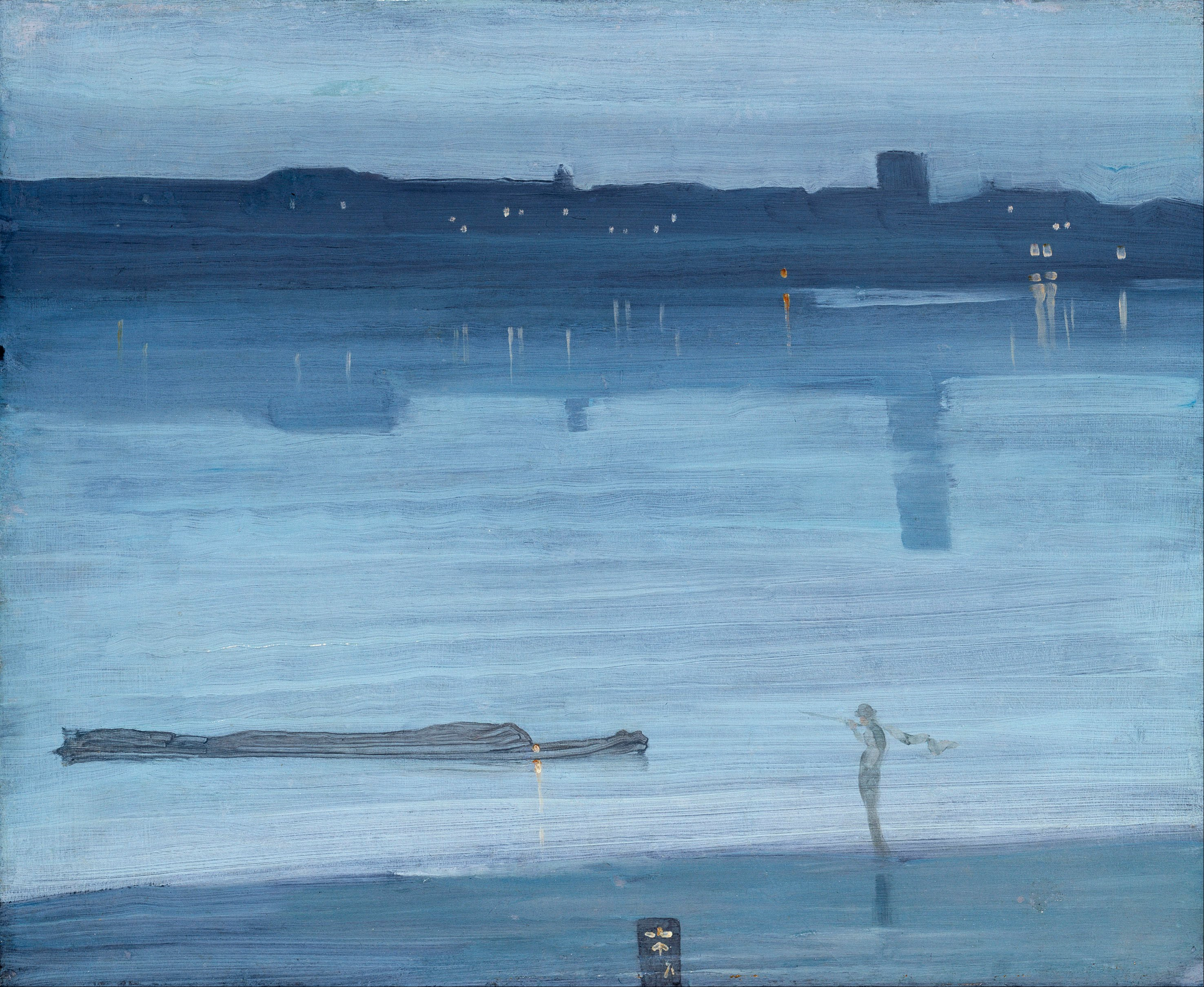
Nocturne: Blue and Silver – Chelsea

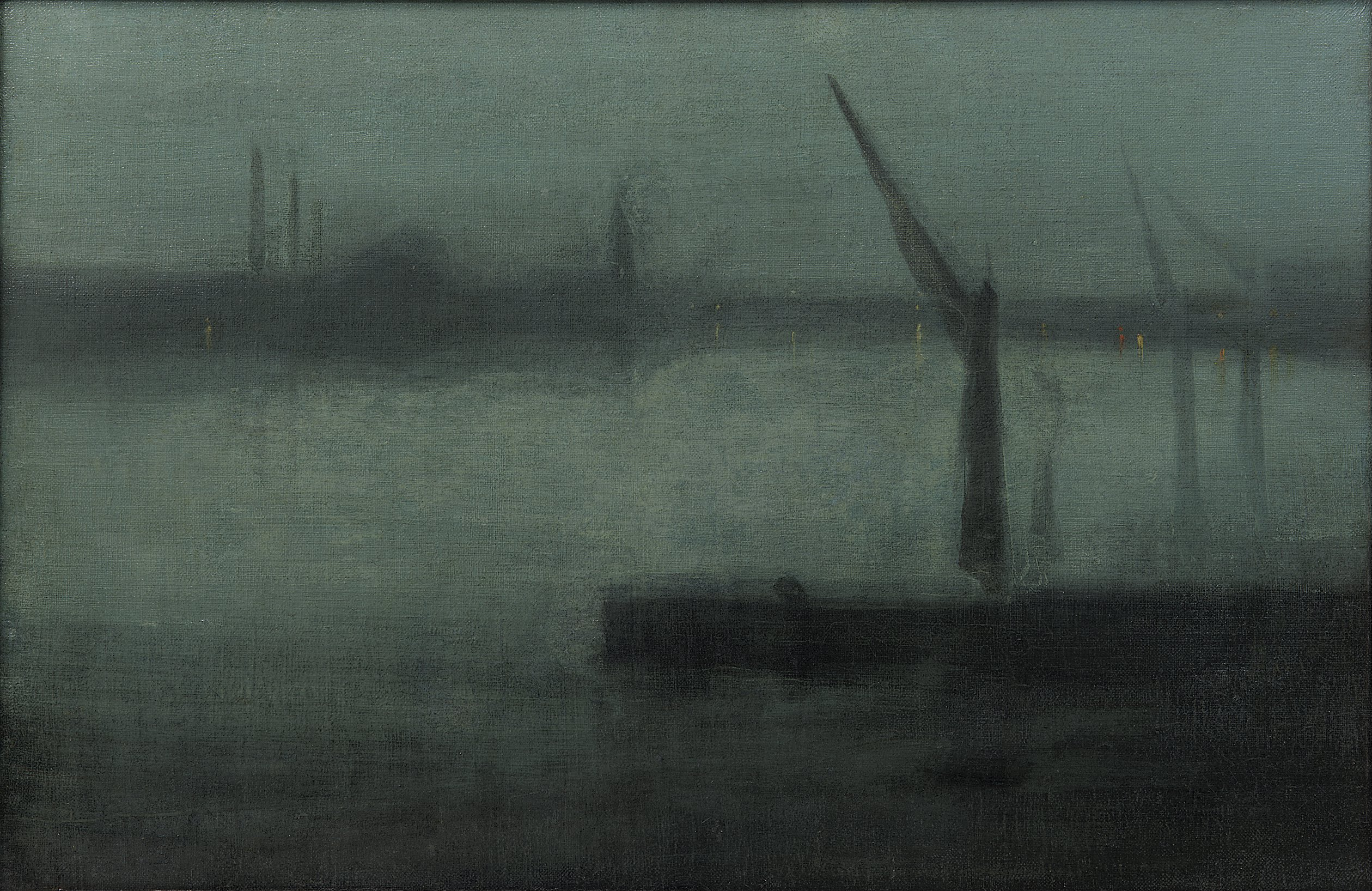
Nocturne: Blue and Silver – Battersea Reach

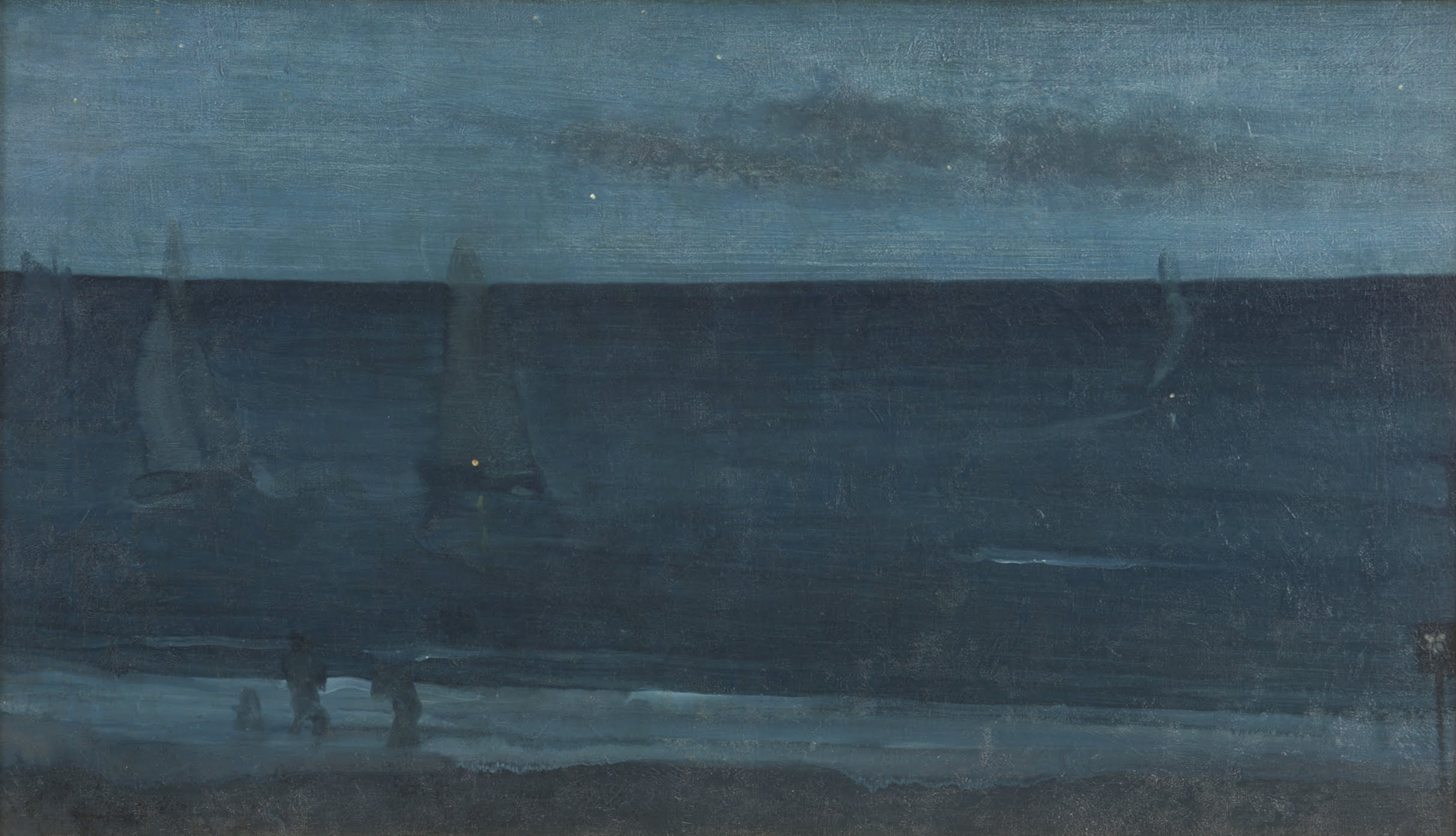
Nocturne: Blue and Silver – Bognor

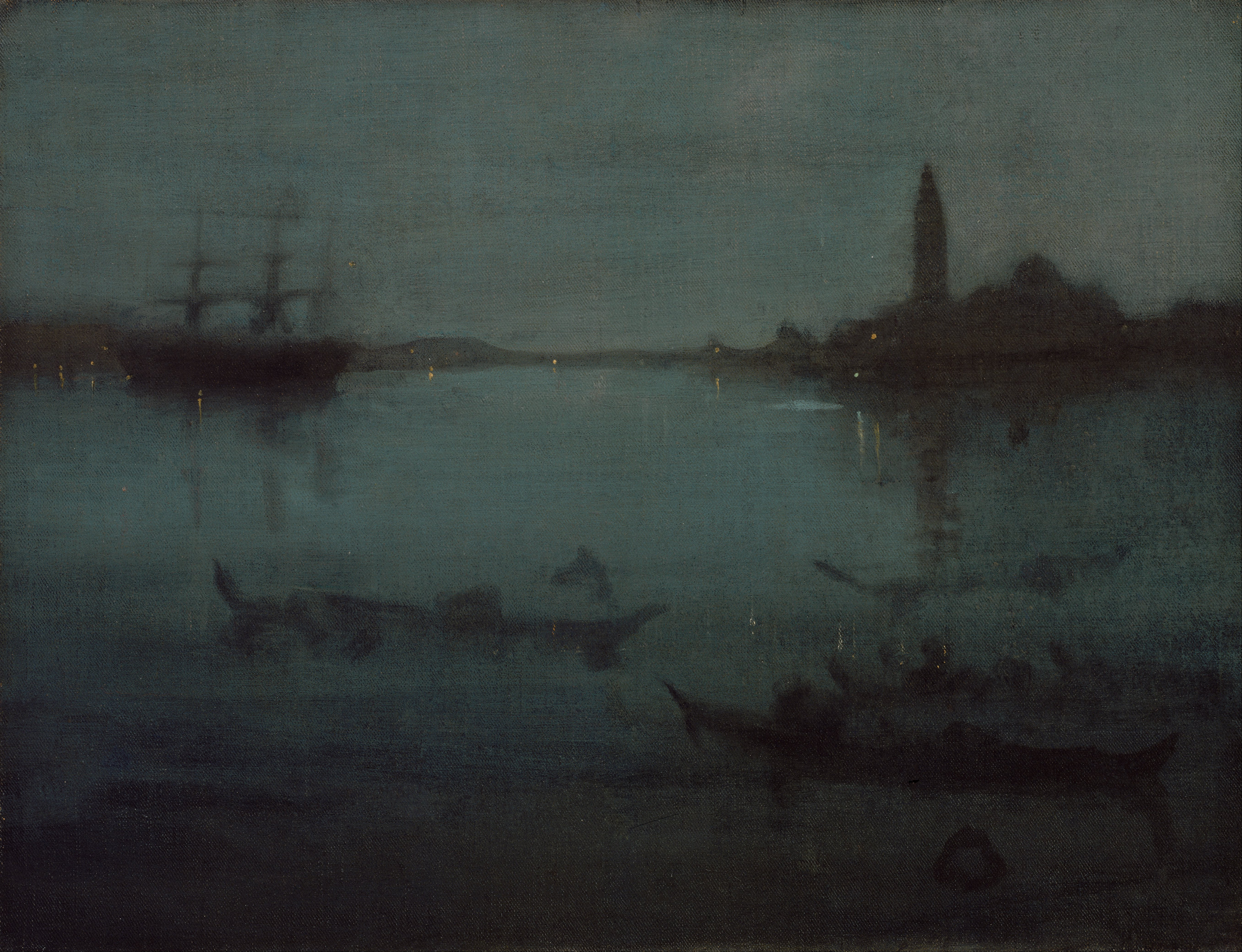
Nocturne: Blue and Silver – The Lagoon, Venice

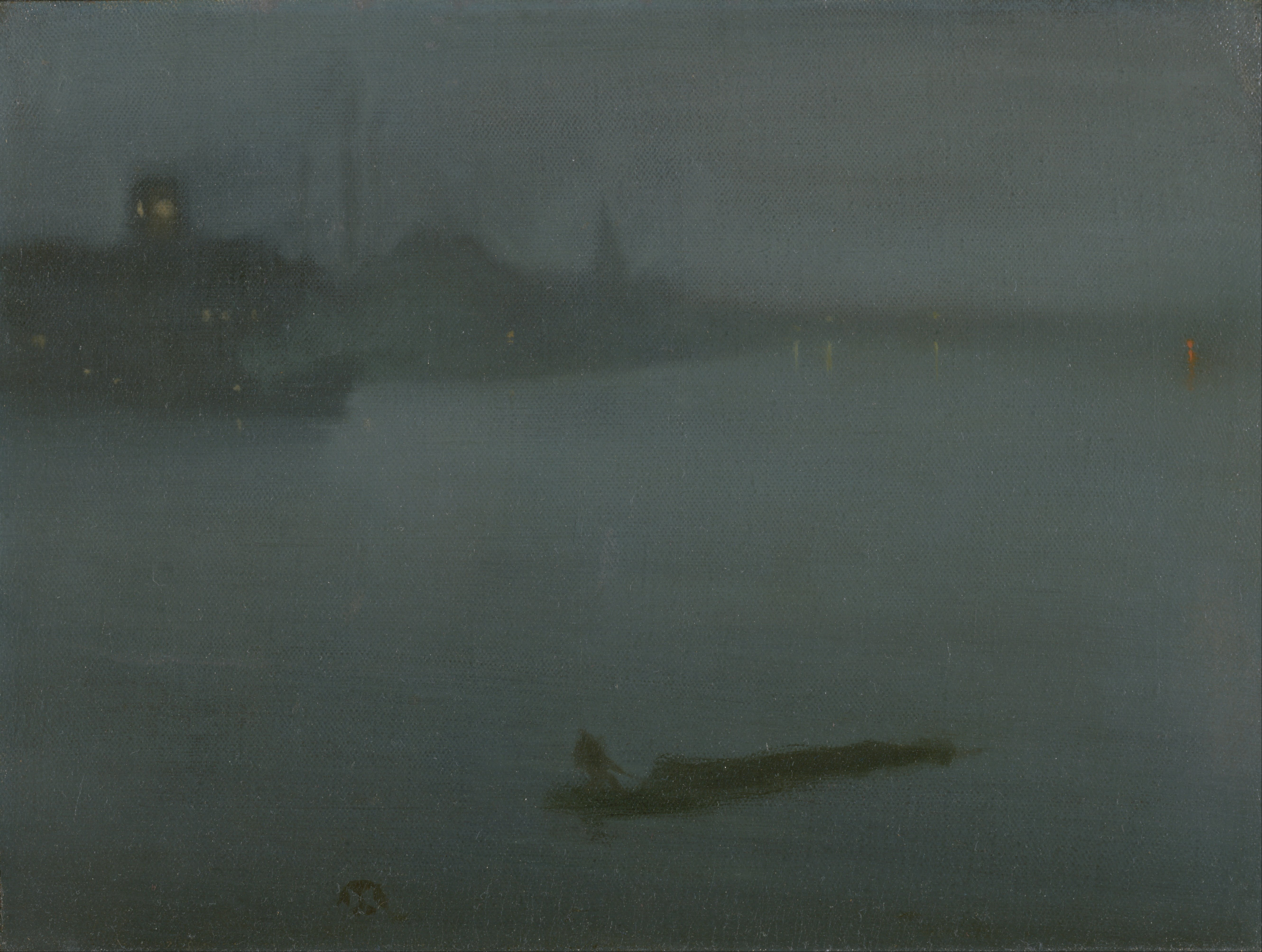
Nocturne: Blue and Silver

== Arrangements ==
The complete work was transcribed in 1910 for two pianos by Maurice Ravel and Raoul Bardac (Debussy's pupil and stepson), and was first performed in 1911. Fêtes was arranged for solo piano by the English pianist Leonard Borwick, and the arrangement has been recorded by Emil Gilels, among others. Fêtes has also been transcribed for large symphonic wind ensemble by Merlin Patterson and William Schaefer.

== Discography ==
Recordings of the complete orchestral version
Year	Conductor	Orchestra	Label
1939	Piero Coppola	Orchestre de Paris	HMV
1940	Leopold Stokowski	The Philadelphia Orchestra	RCA Victor
1952	Ernest Ansermet	L'Orchestre de la Suisse Romande	Decca
1952	Antal Doráti	Minneapolis Symphony Orchestra	Mercury
1953	Jean Fournet	Orchestre de Paris	Philips
1954	Désiré-Émile Inghelbrecht	Orchestre National de France	Columbia
1955	Pierre Monteux	Boston Symphony Orchestra	RCA Victor
1956	Eugene Ormandy	The Philadelphia Orchestra	Columbia
1958	Eduard van Beinum	Royal Concertgebouw Orchestra	Philips
1958	Constantin Silvestri	Orchestre de Paris	EMI
1960	Ernest Ansermet	L'Orchestre de la Suisse Romance	Decca
1960	Leopold Stokowski	London Symphony Orchestra	Capitol
1961	Pierre Dervaux	Orchestre Colonne	Westminster
1961	Leonard Bernstein	New York Philharmonic	Columbia
1961	Manuel Rosenthal	Orchestre National de l'Opéra de Paris	Vega Records
1962	Carlo Maria Giulini	Philharmonia Orchestra	EMI
1962	Charles Munch	Boston Symphony Orchestra	RCA Victor
1962	Pierre Monteux	London Symphony Orchestra	Decca
1962	Paul Paray	Detroit Symphony Orchestra	Mercury
1963	Pierre Monteaux	Orchestre de Paris	RCA Victor
1964	Jean Fournet	Czech Philharmonic	Supraphon
1965	Eugene Ormandy	The Philadelphia Orchestra	Columbia
1969	Sir John Barbirolli	Orchestre de Paris	EMI
1970	Claudio Abbado	Boston Symphony Orchestra	Deutsche Grammophon
1970	Eliahu Inbal	Royal Concertgebouw Orchestra	Philips
1971	Pierre Boulez	New Philharmonia Orchestra	Columbia
1973	Louis de Froment	Orchestre Philharmonique Luxembourg	Vox
1974	Jean Martinon	Orchestre National de France	EMI
1974	Jean Fournet	Radio Filharmonisch Orkest	Decca
1976	Antal Doráti	National Symphony Orchestra	Decca
1978	Daniel Barenboim	Orchestre de Paris	Deutsche Grammophon
1979	Lorin Maazel	The Cleveland Orchestra	Decca
1980	Bernard Haitink	Royal Concertgebouw Orchestra	Philips
1981	Alain Lombard	Orchestre Philharmonique de Strasbourg	Erato
1982	Sir Colin Davis	Boston Symphony Orchestra	Philips
1982	Sergiu Comissiona	Houston Symphony Orchestra	Vanguard
1983	Michael Tilson Thomas	London Philharmonic Orchestra	CBS Masterworks
1984	André Previn	London Symphony Orchestra	EMI
1987	Vladimir Ashkenazy	The Cleveland Orchestra	Decca
1988	Michel Plasson	Orchestre National du Capitole de Toulouse	EMI
1988	Michael Tilson Thomas	Philharmonia Orchestra	CBS Masterworks
1988	Rafael Frühbeck de Burgos	London Symphony Orchestra	IMP Classics
1990	Alexander Rahbari	BRT Philharmonic Orchestra	Naxos
1990	Charles Dutoit	Orchestre symphonique de Montréal	Decca
1990	Yan Pascal Tortelier	Ulster Orchestra	Chandos
1991	Armin Jordan	L'Orchestre de la Suisse Romande	Erato
1992	Sir Georg Solti	Chicago Symphony Orchestra	Decca
1994	Esa-Pekka Salonen	Los Angeles Philharmonic Orchestra	Sony Classical
1994	Jean-Claude Casadesus	L'Orchestre National de Lille	Harmonia Mundi
1999	Lorin Maazel	Wiener Philharmoniker	RCA Victor
2005	Paavo Järvi	Cincinnati Symphony Orchestra	Telarc
2008	Jun Märkl	Orchestre National de Lyon	Naxos
2018	François-Xavier Roth	Les Siècles	Harmonia Mundi
