= Festival des Nuits Romantiques =

Annual classical music festival held in France

Nuits romantiques Aix-les-Bains Riviera des Alpes
- Genre: Classical
- Dates: September; October
- Location(s): Aix-les-Bains, France
- Years active: 1995
- Website: NuitsRomantiques.com

The Festival des Nuits Romantiques (Romantic Nights Festival) is a classical music festival held annually in late September-early October in Aix-les-Bains, France.

Since 1995, the festival has been held on the banks of the Lac du Bourget in mountainous surroundings. Under the leadership of Cyril Huvé, Philippe Cassard and currently Pierre Korzilius, concerts celebrating composers from the 19th and 20th centuries have been held here. Since 2010, the events have also provided training opportunities at the Château de Caramagne for musicians entering the profession under the violinist Nemanja Radulovic.

Past concerts have presented works by Robert Schumann, Johannes Brahms, César Franck, Maurice Ravel, Antonín Dvořák and George Gershwin.

Performers have included Martha Argerich, Radu Lupu, Aldo Ciccolini, Paul Badura-Skoda, Nelson Freire, the violinist Augustin Dumay, the cellist Anne Gastinel, the Alban Berg Quartet, the Accentus Choir, the singers Felicity Lott and Wolfgang Holzmair, the clarinetist Paul Meyer and orchestras including the BBC Philharmonic, Orchestre National de France, Orchestre Philharmonique de Liège and the Budapest Philharmonic Orchestra.
