= Philippe Cassard =

French pianist

Philippe Cassard (born 12 September 1962) is a French classical pianist.

== Biography ==
Born in Besançon, Cassard was trained at the Conservatoire de Paris where he won two first prizes, for piano (Dominique Merlet's class) and for chamber music (Geneviève Joy's class) in 1982. He then spent two years (1983–85), at the University of Music and Performing Arts Vienna (Hans Graf's and Erik Werba's classes). After perfecting his skills with Nikita Magaloff, he was awarded the Clara Haskil International Piano Competition, then in 1988 he won the Dublin International Competition.

He made his concert debut in Paris in 1985 with mezzo-soprano Christa Ludwig.

His international career takes him to Europe, Australia, Canada, Japan, China, South America, Russia. He plays with the major British orchestras (City of Birmingham Symphony Orchestra, London Philharmonic, Royal Philharmonic, English Chamber, Hallé and BBC Manchester, Ulster Orchestra) and under the direction of Neville Marriner, Alexander Gibson, Vladimir Fedoseyev, Yan Pascal Tortelier, Armin Jordan, Thierry Fischer, Charles Dutoit, Emmanuel Krivine, Rico Saccani, Alexander Anisimov, etc.

He is regularly invited to the Festival de La Roque-d'Anthéron, the Irish Great Houses, Kuhmo, Lincoln, Pharos Trust, West Cork, Besançon International Music Festival, La Folle Journée.

He practices chamber music with Natalie Dessay, Karine Deshayes, Angelika Kirchschlager, Stéphanie d'Oustrac, Wolfgang Holzmair, Donna Brown, Isabelle Faust, David Grimal, Anne Gastinel, Diemut Poppen, Matt Haimovitz, Christophe Desjardins, the Moraguès wind quintet, the Ysaÿe, Takács, Ébène, Modigliani, Voce, Chilingirian, Vanbrugh String Quartets etc., actors Philippe Torreton, Françoise Fabian, Judith Magre, Micheline Dax, Roland Bertin, the Solistes de Lyon/Bernard Tétu...

Cassard's name is closely linked to Debussy, a complete recording of which he made in 1994 and that he played in one day and four concerts in Besançon, Paris, Marseille, Angoulème, London, Dublin, Sydney, Tokyo, Lisbon, Vancouver and Singapore. He has recorded several discs dedicated to Schubert. His recording of Brahms' Klavierstücke Op 116 to 119 was released in 2010.

In 2012, several projects related to Debussy were born: complete solo piano projects played in one day (Orchestre Philharmonique de Liège, Lille Piano(s) Festival, Toulouse d'Été, Paris Salle Gaveau); a collaboration with soprano Natalie Dessay in a program that included youth melodies, 4 of which had never been performed before, as well as La Damoiselle élue cantata. Recitals accompany the release of this CD at the Wigmore Hall of London, the salle Pleyel in Paris, the Victoria Hall of Geneva, the Halle aux Grains de Toulouse, the Corum of Montpellier and finally a CD of works for 4 hands and 2 pianos (Prélude à l'après-midi d'un faune, Petite suite, En blanc et noir, Lindaraja, Première Suite pour orchestre, previously unreleased on disc) with pianist François Chaplin.

In 2013, he was invited at La Folle Journée of Nantes, Bilbao and Tokyo/Kanazawa.

He became an adviser to the "classical" music programme at the Fontdouce Abbey Festival (Charente-Maritime), and hired Natalie Dessay, Baptiste Trotignon, Dominique Merlet, Anne Queffélec, Michel Dalberto, Yevgeny Sudbin, Geoffroy Couteau, Roger Muraro, Nelson Goerner, Cédric Pescia, etc.

During the year 2014, Philippe Cassard and Natalie Dessay performed in prestigious venues and festivals: Jordan Hall (Boston), Carnegie Hall (New York), Suntory Hall (Tokyo), Salle Gaveau (Paris), the Flâneries musicales de Reims, as well as in Seoul, Montreal, Quebec City and San Francisco. They recorded a second CD combining melodies by Duparc, Fauré, Chausson and Poulenc.

For "La Dolce Volta" label, Philippe Cassard returned to Schubert, with sonata D959 and works for piano for 4 hands (Fantaisie D940, Lebensstürme D947, Rondo D951) with the Swiss pianist Cédric Pescia.

Cassard was artistic director of the Festival des Nuits Romantiques (1999–2008). He invited artists such as Martha Argerich, Radu Lupu, Aldo Ciccolini, Jordi Savall, the Alban Berg Quartett, Felicity Lott, Augustin Dumay, Leif Ove Andsnes, Nelson Freire, Paul Meyer, André Dussollier, the BBC Philharmonic, the Orchestre national de France etc.

A regular producer at France Musique since 2005 with more than 400 broadcasts of Notes du traducteur, a program that was crowned by the SCAM prize for "best sound work" in 2007, all radios combined. A boxed set of 6 CDs containing some of the programmes he devoted to Schubert was released at the end of 2011 (France Musique/Harmonia Mundi) and won the Grand Prix of the Académie Charles-Cros. In 2015, another 6-CD box set was issued, this time dedicated to Debussy.

Since September 2014, he has been collaborating on the broadcast Classic avec Dessay on France Inter, providing the musical programming.

He has been giving masterclasses since 2008 at the Royal Northern College of Music in Manchester (Visiting Tutor), and at the Tibor Varga Academy in Sion (Switzerland) during the summer. He was a jury member at international competitions in Geneva, Epinal, Dublin, Melbourne.

Philippe Cassard is the author of an essay dedicated to Schubert (Actes Sud - Classica, 2008) and an interview book with Jean Narboni and Marc Chevrie Deux temps trois mouvements (Capricci, 2012) devoted to music and cinema.

=== Distinction ===
- Chevalier of the National Order of Merit (1999)

== Selected discography ==
- Ludwig van Beethoven's Symphony No 9 in D minor, Op. 125, transcribed in 1851 for two pianos by Franz Liszt and catalogued as S. 657, with Cédric Pescia (La Dolce Volta, 2020)
- Schubert's Sonata in A major, D. 959 + Fantasia in F minor for piano four-hands, D 940, Lebensstürme D947, Rondo D951 with Cédric Pescia (La Dolce Volta, 2014)
- Debussy's Mélodies, with Natalie Dessay, soprano (Virgin's Classics, 2012)
- Debussy's Works for piano for 4 hands and 2 pianos, with François Chaplin (Decca, 2012)
- Johannes Brahms's Klavierstücke Op. 116-119 (2010)
- Franz Schubert's 4 Impromptus D899, 4 Impromptus D935, 2 Lieder transcribed by Liszt (2008)
- Robert Schumann's Fantasiestücke Op. 12, Kinderszenen Op. 15, Humoresk Op. 20 (2004)
- Jean Françaix's Concertino, with the Ulster Orchestra, direction Thierry Fischer (2004)
- Franz Schubert's Sonata in B-flat major, D. 960, Piano Sonata in A major, D 664 (2002)
- Victor Hugo, poèmes en musique, with Marie Devellereau, soprano (melodies by Bizet, Fauré, Saint-Saens, Lalo, Hahn, Liszt, Britten, Donizetti)
- Sur le bout des doigts: works by Scarlatti, Bach, Schubert (Impromptu op.142/1), Chopin (Prélude, Étude), Schumann (Arabesque, first movement of the Trio in G minor), Debussy (Toccata, Jardins sous la pluie), Smetana (Final of the Trio in G minor) with the participation of David Grimal (violin) and Henri Demarquette (cello)
- Debussy's Préludes (books 1 and 2), Images (books 1 and 2), Estampes, Images Oubliées, L'Isle Joyeuse
- Portes Ouvertes: music of the 20th century with Matt Haimovitz, cello; Debussy, Sonata - Benjamin Britten's Sonata Op. 65 - Anton Webern's 3 little pieces Op. 11.

== Publications ==
- Franz Schubert, Actes Sud, 2008, ISBN 978-2-7427-7349-7
- Deux temps trois mouvements. Un pianiste au cinéma, interview with Marc Chevrie and Jean Narboni, Capricci, 2012
