= Nemanja Radulović =

Serbian violinist

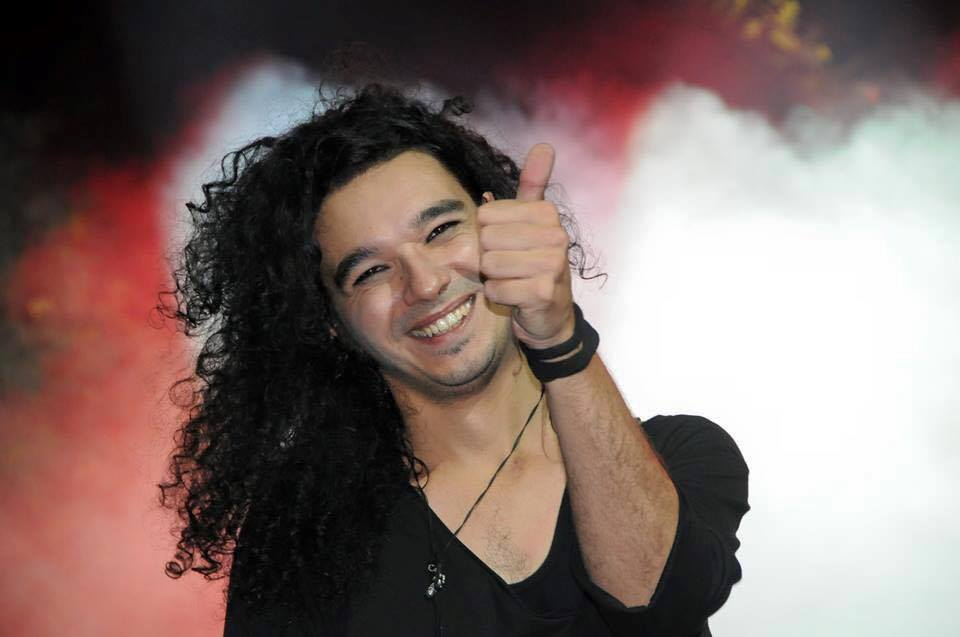
- Born: 18 October 1985 (age 40); Niš, SR Serbia, SFR Yugoslavia
- Education: Hochschule für Musik Saar; University of Arts in Belgrade; Conservatoire de Paris.

Nemanja Radulović (Serbian Cyrillic: Немања Радуловић; born 18 October 1985) is a Serbian violinist.

== Life and career ==
Radulović began studying the violin in 1992. In 1996, he was awarded the October Prize for music of the city of Belgrade, and in the following year, he received the Special Prize from the Serbian Ministry of Education for "Talent 1997". He continued his musical studies in 1998 at the Hochschule für Musik Saar in Saarbrücken with Joshua Epstein, and in 1999, at the University of Arts in Belgrade, with Dejan Mihailović. At the age of fourteen, he moved to France to study with Patrice Fontanarosa at the Conservatoire de Paris.

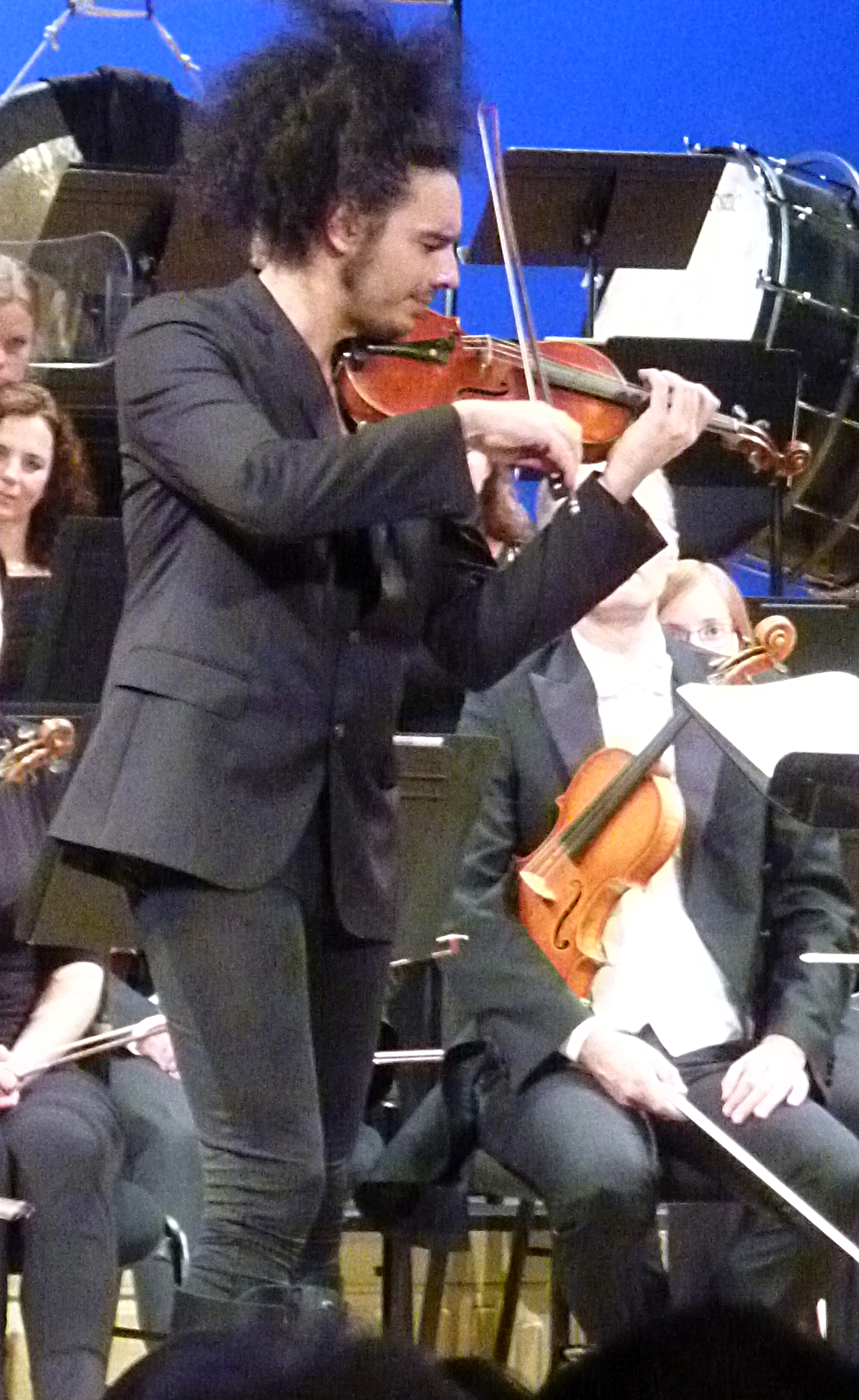
Nemanja Radulovic during the concert given at the Vichy Opera on November 11, 2016 with the orchestra Noord Nederlands Orkest conducted by Michel Tabachnik

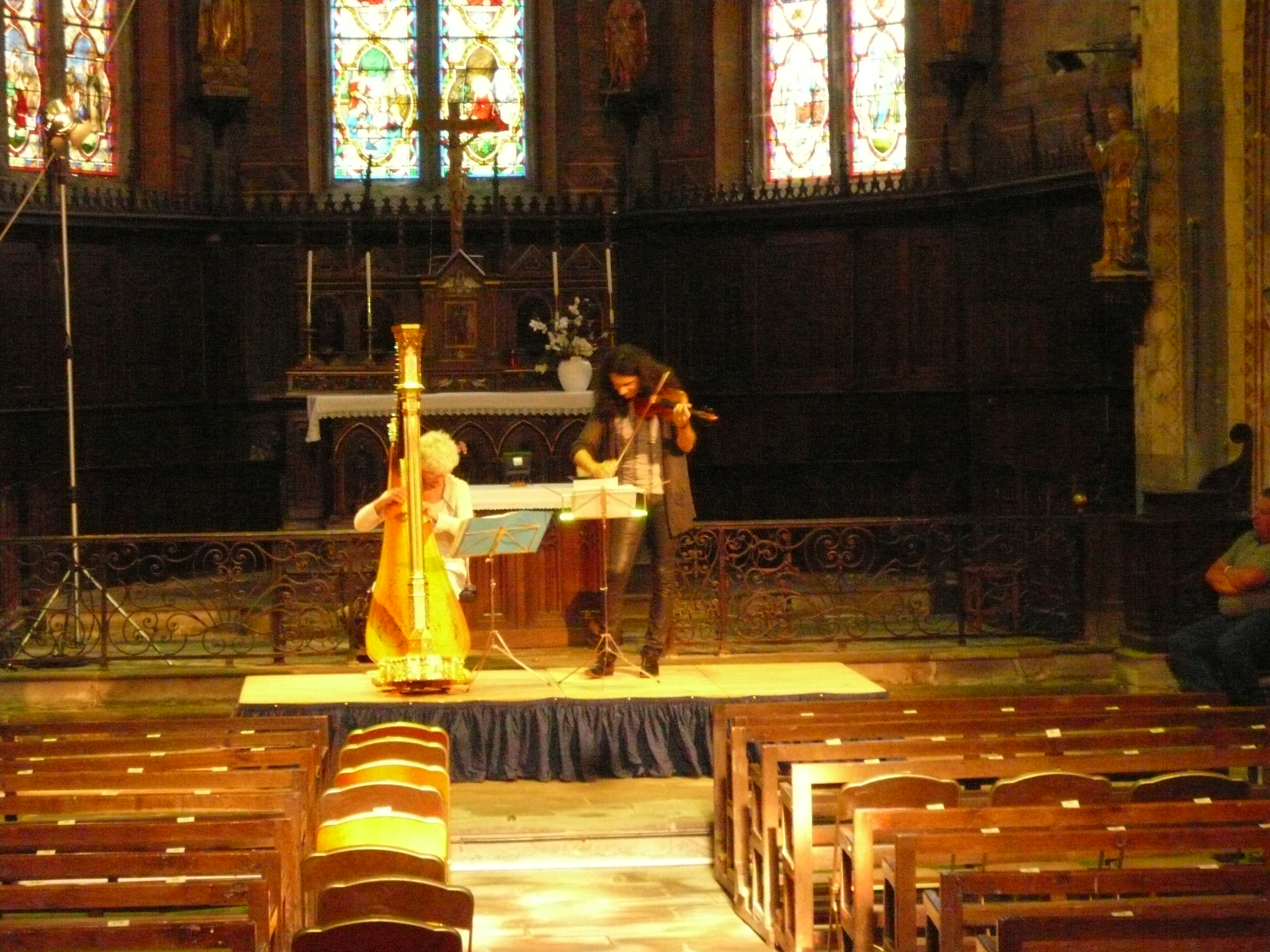
Marielle Nordmann, harp and Nemanja Radulovic, violin in rehearsal at the Concerts de Vollore, Escoutoux, on 27 July 2010

In 2006, on short notice, he replaced Maxim Vengerov in Beethoven's Violin Concerto with the Orchestre Philharmonique de Radio France and Myung-Whun Chung at the Salle Pleyel. Since then, he has performed as an international soloist with the two chamber ensembles he founded, The Devil's Trills and Double Sens. He performs regularly with the harpist Marielle Nordmann and the pianists Laure Favre-Kahn, Dominique Plancade and Susan Manoff. He is closely associated with the Festival des Nuits Romantiques. Radulović plays on an 1843 violin by Jean-Baptiste Vuillaume.

== Awards and honours ==
- 1996 – October Prize, City of Belgrade
- 1997 – "Talent of the Year", Serbian Ministry of Education
- 1998 – Fifth Prize, International Violin Competition, "Rodolfo Price Lipizer"
- 2001 – Winner of Stradivarius violin competition, Cremona, Italy
- 2001 – 1st prize & Winner of George Enescu International Competition, special prize for the interpretation of 3rd Enescu sonata. Bucharest, Romania
- 2003 – First Prize, International Joseph Joachim Violin Competition, Hanover, Germany
- 2005 – "International Revelation of the Year", Victoires classical music
- 2006 – "Rising Star", 2006/2007
- 2014 – "Soloist instrumental", Victoires classical music
- 2017 – Order of Karađorđe's Star
- 2017 – Chevalier des arts et des lettres, French national title

== Discography ==
- 2006 – Pièces pour violon seul (Transart Live)
- 2008 – Mendelssohn, Concertos pour violon 1 et 2 (Transart Live)
- 2009 – Les trilles du diable (Decca)
- 2010 – Beethoven, Sonates pour violon et piano 5, 7 et 8, avec Susan Manoff, piano (Decca)
- 2011 – Les cinq saisons (les quatre saisons de Vivaldi et "Spring in Japan", composition originale d'Alexander Sedlar) (Decca)
- 2013 – Après un rêve, avec Marielle Nordmann (Transart)
- 2013 – Paganini Fantasy (Deutsche Grammophon)
- 2014 – Carnets de Voyage (Deutsche Grammophon)
- 2014 – Journey East (Deutsche Grammophon)
- 2016 – Bach (Deutsche Grammophon)
- 2017 – Tchaikovsky: Violin concerto – Rococo Variations (Deutsche Grammophon)
- 2018 – Baïka (Deutsche Grammophon)
- 2020 – Essentials (Deutsche Grammophon)
- 2022 – Roots (Catalogue Marketing Classique/Warer Classics)
- 2023 – Beethoven, Violin Concerto Op. 61 D Major u. Violin Sonata No. 9 "Kreutzer"
