= Donna Brown (soprano) =

Canadian soprano opera singer

Donna Brown (born 15 February 1955) is a Canadian soprano opera singer.

Donna Brown's voice has been described as "pure, shimmering soprano" and "expressive nuanced singing, coupled with pure gleaming tone". She has performed on opera and concert stages in Europe, Asia, North America, and South America. Her repertoire covers opera, oratorio, recital, and chamber music, as well as contemporary collaborations.

== Studies ==
Brown studied voice, piano, and composition in Ottawa and voice performance at McGill University in Montreal. She moved to Paris to continue her studies with Noémie Pérugia on the interpretation of French Art Song. Brown studied vocal technique and opera with Daniel Ferro at the Fondation Royaumont in France, and German Lied at the Franz Schubert Institute in Baden bei Wien, Austria. Further studies included oratorio and opera in Salzburg with Edith Mathis, and belcanto technique in Venice with Randolf Mickelson.

== Opera ==
Brown's opera career began as Michaela in the Peter Brook production of La Tragédie de Carmen in 1981. The production played for three months in Paris at Peter Brook's Théâtre des Bouffes du Nord, and subsequently toured Europe.

Further opera roles included Pamina in Die Zauberflöte, Sophie in Der Rosenkavalier, Almirena in Rinaldo, Gilda in Rigoletto, Rosina in The Barber of Seville, Michaela in Carmen, Nanetta in Falstaff, Zerlina in Don Giovanni, Servillia in La Clemenza di Tito, Serpetta in La Finta Giardiniera, Madeleine in Le Postillon de Lonjumeau, Aricie in Hippolyte et Aricie, and Morgana in Alcina.

Brown performed with major opera companies including the Opéra national de Paris (Opéra Bastille and Palais Garnier), English National Opera (London Coliseum), Grand Théâtre de Genève, Théâtre royal de la Monnaie (Brussels), Théâtre du Capitole de Toulouse, Théâtre des Champs-Élysées, Amsterdam Royal Opera, Dutch National Opera (Opera Amsterdam), Canadian Opera Company, and Vancouver Opera.

Brown created two opera roles: the role of Chimène in the world premiere creation of Debussy's unfinished opera Rodrigue et Chimène under the direction of Kent Nagano for the Opéra de Lyon in 1993, and the role of Scylla in Scylla et Glaucus, under the direction of Sir John Eliot Gardiner, for the Opéra de Lyon in 1986.

== Concerts ==
Aside from opera, Brown has performed with major conductors including Sir John Eliot Gardiner, Bernard Haitink, Helmuth Rilling, Kent Nagano, Wolfgang Sawallisch, Kurt Masur, Carlo Maria Giulini, Jeffrey Tate, Charles Dutoit, Antonio Pappano, Armin Jordan, Daniel Barenboim, and Jane Glover.

Brown recorded a number of CDs and DVDs with both Helmuth Rilling and John Eliot Gardiner. She also sang for baroque specialist conductors William Christie, Trevor Pinnock, Philippe Hereweghe, Bernard Labadie, Hervé Niquet, Frieder Bernius, Frans Brüggen, and Jean Claude Malgoire.

Brown has appeared with many orchestras around the world, including the London Philharmonic, NHK Symphony Orchestra Tokyo, Orchestre de Paris, Madrid Symphony Orchestra, Florence Orchestra dell'Accademia Nazionale di Santa Cecilia, Berliner Symphoniker, Orquestra Sinfônica do Estado de São Paulo, Philadelphia Orchestra, San Francisco Orchestra, Israel Philharmonic Orchestra, Orchestre Symphonique de Montréal, and Vancouver Symphony Orchestra, on works ranging from early baroque and classic through to contemporary. These concerts were held in venues including the Barbican, Royal Albert Hall, Wiener Konzerthaus, Suntory Hall in Tokyo, Musikverein in Vienna, Theatro Municipal (São Paulo), and Salle Pleyel in Paris.

The Canadian composer R. Murray Schafer composed the piece Gitanjali for Brown's voice. She performed Gitanjali with the NAC orchestra for its world premiere at the National Arts Centre in Ottawa in 1992, with further performances and a recording for CBC records.

== Recitals ==
During her career Brown has performed in numerous Art Song recitals, with pianists including Roger Vignoles, Menahem Pressler, Philippe Cassard, Stephane Lemelin, Jean-Marc Luisada, Maria-João Pires, Michel Dalberto, Paul Badura Skoda, Jean Marc Luisada, Stefan Mendl, Peter Tiefenbach, Bruce Ubukata, Stephen Ralls, Jean Desmarais, Alain Planes, Jane Coop, Francoise Tillard, Cyril Huvé, Olivier Godin, Martin Dubé, and Michael McMahon. She sang recitals with harpists Frédérique Cambreling, Jennifer Swartz, and Judy Loman, and performed in chamber concerts with Vienna Piano Trio, Quatuor Ebene, and Trio Hochelaga.

== Teaching ==
Brown teaches advanced healthy vocal technique and musicality.

She was a visiting professor at the Yonsei University in Seoul, South Korea, the Schola Cantorum de Caracas in Venezuela, and the Bachakademie in Santiago de Compostela, Spain. She taught at the University of Ottawa and is currently teaching at the Conservatoire de musique du Québec à Montréal.

== Discography ==
- "Villa-Lobos Bachianas Brasileiras #5" Roberto Minczuk conductor. 2007. BIS
- "Haydn Nelsonmesse; Theresienmesse" Sir John Eliot Gardiner conductor. 2002. Philips
- "Mozart Coronation Mass; Exsultate Jubilate" Helmuth Rilling conductor. KV 317. 2001. Hänssler 98.395
- "Debussy Mélodies de jeunesse" Stéphane Lemelin piano. 2001. Atma ACD 2 2209
- "Berlioz Messe Solennelle" Orchestre Revolutionnaire et Romantique. Gardiner conductor. 2001. Philips 464 688-2
- "Frühlingslieder. Brahms – Liszt – Schubert – Schumann – Wolf – et al." Lemelin piano. 1998. Atma ACD 2 2165
- "Schafer The Garden of the Heart" National Arts Centre Orchestra, Mario Bernardi conductor. 1997. CBC SMCD-5173
- "Handel Agrippina. Gardiner conductor" 1997. Philips 438 009-2
- "Handel Alexander's Feast" Gardiner conductor. 1987. Philips 422–053–2
- "Schubert Mass in A-flat major" Oregon Bach Festival Orchestra. Rilling conductor. 1997. Hänssler 98.120
- "Haydn Die Schöpfung" English Baroque Soloists. Gardiner conductor. 1997. Archiv 449217
- "Bach Mass in F major, Mass in A major" Rilling conductor. 1995. Hänssler 98.924
- "Verdi Requiem/Quattro Pezzi Sacri" Orchestre Revolutionnaire et Romantique. Gardiner conductor. 1995. Philips 442 142-2
- "Debussy Rodrigue et Chimène. Lyon National Opera Orchestra. Kent Nagano conductor. 1995. Erato 4509–98508–2
- "Fanny Mendelssohn Lieder & Trio" Françoise Tillard piano. 1992. Opus 111
- "Brahms A German Requiem" Rilling conductor. 1991. Hänssler 98.966
- "Handel/Mozart Der Messias" Rilling conductor. 1991. Hänssler 98.975
- "Handel Saul" Gardiner conductor. 1991. Philips
- "Leclair Scylla et Glaucus" Gardiner conductor. 1988. Erato 2292–45277–2
- "Lully Miserere. La Chapelle Royale" Philippe Herreweghe conductor. 1985. Harmonia Mundi La Solothèque HMS 926013
- "Requiem der Versöhnung" Rilling conductor. 1995. Haenssler 98.931
- "Verdi Don Carlos" Antonio Pappano conductor. 1996 EMI 363.31
- "A Journey of Longing" 21 Brahms songs with pianist Jane Coop.2015 Skylark Music Sky1501
- "Maria, Margaret. Between Worlds" 2022. CMCCD 30522
