= The Lagoon, Venice =

Painting by James McNeill Whistler

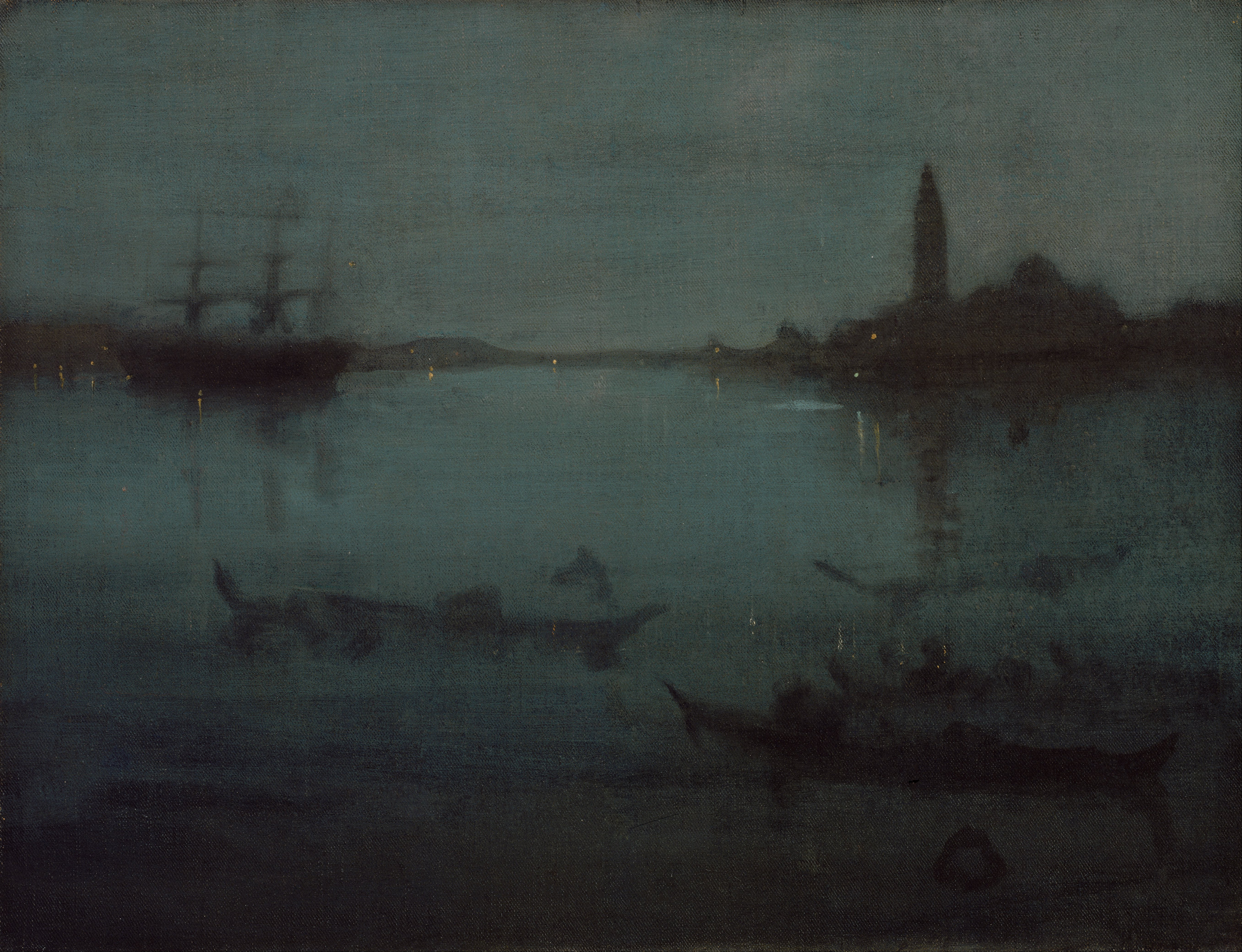
- Artist: James McNeill Whistler
- Year: 1879-80
- Type: Oil on canvas, landscape painting
- Dimensions: 50.1 cm × 65.4 cm (19.7 in × 25.7 in)
- Location: Burrell Collection, Glasgow

Nocturne in Blue and Silver: The Lagoon, Venice is a c.1880 oil painting by the American-born artist James McNeill Whistler. It depicts the Venetian Lagoon by night looking from the Royal Gardens towards San Giorgio and the Lido. It stylistically resembles the nocturnes that Whistler had been producing over the previous decade of the River Thames as it ran through London.

It was produced during a fifteen-month stay in the city, Whistler's only visit to Venice. Following the fallout of his libel trail against John Ruskin for remarks about Whistler's submissions to the Grosvenor Gallery Exhibition of 1877, Whistler had been commissioned by the Fine Art Society to travel to Venice to produce a series of etchings which offered a chance to restore his battered finances. It was one of two oil paintings he produced during his stay along with St Mark’s, Venice. The picture was never exhibited during the artist's lifetime. The painting was at one point owned by Whistler's regular model Carmen Rossi who allegedly took it from his studio. The painting was acquired by the Museum of Fine Arts in Boston, which acquired it in 1942.

== See also ==
- List of paintings by James McNeill Whistler

== Bibliography ==
- Adelson, Warren. Sargent's Venice. Yale University Press, 2006
- MacDonald, Margaret F. Palaces in the Night: Whistler in Venice. University of California Press, 2001.
- Murphy, Paul Thomas. Falling Rocket: James Whistler, John Ruskin, and the Battle for Modern Art, Simon & Schuster, 2023.
- Sutherland, Daniel E. Whistler: A Life for Art's Sake. Yale University Press, 2014.
