= Marie Devellereau =

French light lyric operatic soprano

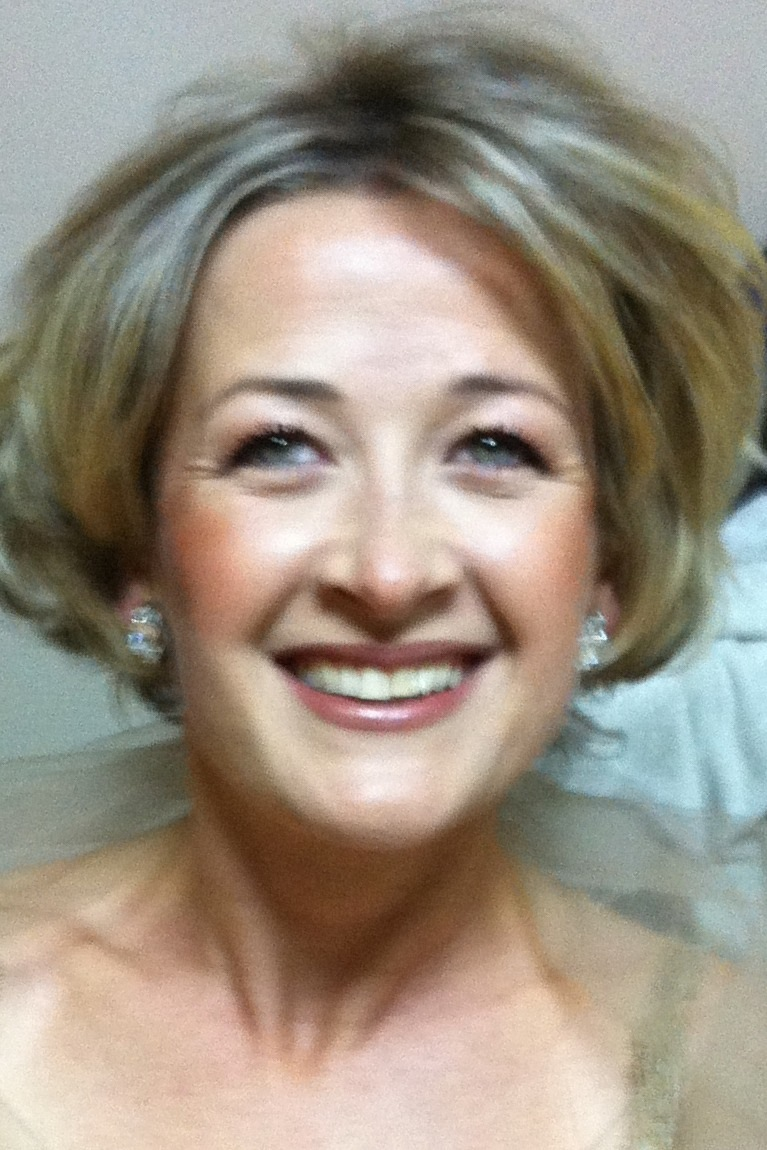
Marie Devellereau, Moscow October 2011

Marie Devellereau (born 1971) is a French light lyric operatic soprano.

== Biography ==
Graduated from the Juilliard School, Devellereau was revealed to the general public by the "Voice Masters" of Monte-Carlo which she won in 1997.

The Opéra National de Paris welcomed her first major role - Sœur Constance - in Dialogues of the Carmelites, conducted by Seiji Ozawa, before finding her again in Parsifal, Peter Grimes, Don Carlos and Der Rosenkavalier as Sophie.

In 2001, Devellereau was a finalist at the Plácido Domingo Competition in Washington.

In her 20-year career, she has performed on numerous national and international stages. In France she sang at the Théâtre des Champs-Élysées, the Théâtre du Châtelet, the Salle Pleyel, the Opéra National de Lyon, the Royal Opera of Versailles, the Cité de la Musique and the Chorégies d'Orange.

In Europe, she has appeared at La Scala in Milan, the Teatro dell'Opera di Roma, the Teatro Lirico Giuseppe Verdi in Trieste, the Grand Théâtre de Genève, the Salle des Princes Forum Grimaldi in Monaco, and at the Royal Concertgebouw of Amsterdam.

In the United States, she was welcomed at the David Geffen Hall (New York), the San Francisco Opera, the Tanglewood Festival.

In the rest of the world, audiences greeted her at the Shanghai Opera, the Forbidden City Concert Hall in Beijing among others.

Her clear and flexible tone suits the Anglo-Saxon repertoire. Composers such as Bernstein, Argento, Britten, Barber reveal her suave voice.

The soprano is noted for a clear diction and for her interpretations of the French mélodie repertoire, including works by Debussy, Poulenc, Fauré, and Hahn, as well as Russian repertoire, particularly music by Rachmaninoff.

At the Opera, Devellereau performs high-pitched vocal parts in libretti by Delibes, Massenet, Strauss, Britten, and Honegger.

Devellereau has made a name for herself in the interpretation of the pieces by Offenbach.

Her jovial, mischievous and iconoclastic spirit was also displayed with the Orchestre de Pau Pays de Béarn, conducted by chef Fayçal Karoui and directed by Jean Manifacier, at the New Year's concert.

She also likes Oratorio and the concert repertoire, rich in works that correspond to her vocal range: Poulenc's Stabat mater and Gloria, Mozart's Great Mass in C minor, K. 427 and Requiem, Fauré's Requiem, Pergolesis' Stabat Mater, Haydn's Creation and the Saisons and Bach's St John Passion for Oratorio.

In concert, she was hailed in Benjamin Britten's Les Illuminations, Debussy's La Damoiselle élue and Le Martyre de saint Sébastien, Berg's Seven Early Songs, Szymanowski's Songs of a Fairy-Tale Princess Op. 31 (1933) and Gustav Mahler's symphonies.

She released several records accompanied by pianists Philippe Cassard and Cédric Tiberghien, with whom she recorded Erik Satie's Je te veux for example.

She also participates in research on the vocal range with Nicole Scotto di Carlo, research director at the CNRS; published in Science & Vie.

== Discography ==
- Jules Massenet's Thaïs, with Renée Fleming and the Orchestre National Bordeaux Aquitaine (dir. Yves Abel), Decca Records, 2000
- Poèmes en Musique - Victor Hugo, accompanied by Philippe Cassard, Harmonia Mundi (Ambroisie), 2006
- Alexandre Tansman's The pledge, with the Chœur de Radio France and the Orchestre philharmonique de Radio France (dir. Alain Altinoglu), Harmonia Mundi, 2007
- Albert Roussel's mélodies, with the Orchestre philharmonique du Luxembourg (dir. Jean-Yves Ossonce), Abeille Musique (Timpani label), 2008
