= Piero Coppola =

Italian composer

- Piero Coppola (photo with 1955 dedication)
- Occupation: conductor

Piero Coppola (11 October 1888 – 17 March 1971) was an Italian conductor, pianist and composer.

== Life and career ==
Coppola was born in Milan; his parents were both singers. He studied at the Milan Conservatory, graduating in piano and composition in 1910. By 1911 he was already conducting opera at La Scala opera house in Milan. That year he heard Debussy conduct his own compositions Ibéria and Prélude à l'après-midi d'un faune in Turin: an experience that "had a decisive influence on his career". He then worked in Brussels, Belgium before spending the duration of World War I in Scandinavia.

In 1921 Coppola resided in London and he later moved to France. Between 1923 and 1934 he was the artistic director of La Voix de son maître, the French branch of The Gramophone Company. In 1924 he was asked by Sylvia Beach to make a recording of James Joyce reading from Ulysses: Coppola replied that the recording would have to be made at Beach's expense, would not have the His Master's Voice trademark on it and would not be listed in the catalog. In the late 1920s and 1930s Coppola conducted recordings of many works of Debussy and Ravel, including the first recordings of Debussy's La mer and Ravel's Boléro. Coppola's conducting enjoyed the admiration of Debussy, although the composer never actually heard Coppola perform any of his works. His work in French repertoire has been widely praised. His recordings of Debussy have been described as "without rival for the period", with his 1938 recording of Nocturnes eulogized as a "masterpiece" and among the early recordings "closest to Debussy's thought". His recording of Ravel's Le tombeau de Couperin won the Grand Prix du Disque in 1932. Coppola also conducted the first recording of Prokofiev's Third Piano Concerto, with Prokofiev himself as soloist, in June 1932.

From 1939 onwards Coppola worked in Lausanne, Switzerland, where he died.

== Compositions ==
Coppola composed two operas, a symphony, and some shorter works. According to a 1921 article in the Musical Times, his music "is all nerves, and always has a decisive rhythmic character". The article went on to describe Coppola as "[a] very strong musician, [who] loves to translate musically certain grotesque and gruesome poses which he succeeds in making very impressive".

== Family ==
Despite many unsubstantiated claims, there is no known family relationship between Piero Coppola and the musician brothers Anton and Carmine Coppola or Carmine's son Francis Ford Coppola.

== Recording premieres ==
- Debussy, La mer, orchestra, 1928
- Honegger, Pacific 231, unidentified symphony orchestra, His Master's Voice D 2030, 1927
- Ravel, Shéhérazade, Marcelle Gerar (soprano), orchestra, The Gramophone Company, November 1928, Paris
- Ravel, Boléro, orchestra, The Gramophone Company, January 8, 1930, Paris
- Prokofiev, Third Piano Concerto, Sergei Prokofiev (piano), London Symphony Orchestra, His Master's Voice, June 27–28, 1932, London
- Ravel, Daphnis et Chloé suite number 1, Orchestre de la Société des Concerts du Conservatoire, The Gramophone Company, 1934, Paris

== Writings ==
- Coppola, Piero (1982) [1944]. Dix-sept ans de musique à Paris, 1922-1939 (in French). Geneva: Slatkine. ISBN 2-05-000208-4.
