= Rodrigue et Chimène =

- Unfinished opera by Claude Debussy
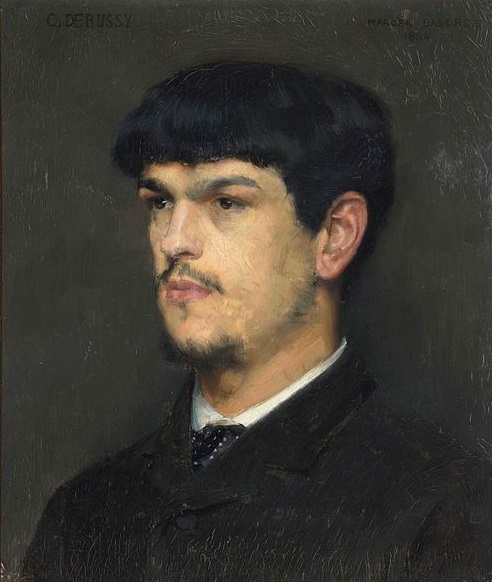
- Debussy portrayed by Marcel Baschet, 1884
- Librettist: Catulle Mendès
- Language: French
- Based on: Legend of El Cid
- Premiere: 14 May 1993; Lyon

Rodrigue et Chimène (English: Rodrigo and Ximena) is an unfinished opera in three acts by Claude Debussy. The French libretto, by Catulle Mendès, is based on the plays Las Mocedades del Cid by Guillén de Castro y Bellvís and Corneille's Le Cid which deal with the legend of El Cid (Rodrigue in the opera). It was first staged in a version completed by Edison Denisov in Lyon on 14 May 1993.

== Composition ==
Mendès had begun work on his libretto in 1878, hoping to offer it to "one of the leading lights of the French school [of opera]". Massenet's Le Cid (1885, Paris Opera) may have put Mendès off in his search for a composer. It was only in April, 1890 that Mendès handed it to the young Debussy. Mendès had predicted that Debussy would become "one of the great composers of the future" and had helped to promote his music.

Although he was unimpressed by the literary quality of the drama he had to set, Debussy was encouraged by the prospect that his work would be performed at the Paris Opéra and earn him some money. Over the next two years, Debussy's musical style developed in a radically new direction and his enthusiasm for the old-fashioned Rodrigue et Chimène began to flag. In a letter of January, 1892, he admitted, "My life is hardship and misery thanks to this opera. Everything about it is wrong for me."

On 17 May 1893, Debussy attended a performance of Maeterlinck's Symbolist play Pelléas et Mélisande and realised that this was exactly the type of drama he had been looking for. When he played excerpts from the score of Rodrigue et Chimène to Paul Dukas in August of the same year, he confessed that Mendès' libretto was "totally at odds with all that I dream about, demanding a type of music that is alien to me". Debussy abandoned any idea of bringing Rodrigue et Chimène to the stage and later claimed he had accidentally burned it.

== Completion and staging ==
The score did, however, survive and the various manuscripts, after being owned by Alfred Cortot were eventually assembled by the American collector Robert Owen Lehman. Excerpts from a vocal score prepared by the musicologist Richard Langham Smith were performed at the Bibliothèque nationale in Paris in June 1987. Debussy had completed all but the orchestration of Rodrigue et Chimène (although two scenes of the vocal score have been lost). The Russian composer Edison Denisov was asked to provide the orchestration for a stage performance to mark the opening of Opéra de Lyon's new auditorium, "Opéra Nouvel". Thus Rodrigue et Chimène finally received its premiere in Lyon on 14 May 1993.

== Roles ==
| Role | Voice type | Premiere Cast (Denisov completion, 14 May 1993) Conductor: Kent Nagano |
|---|---|---|
| Rodrigue | tenor | Laurence Dale |
| Chimène | soprano | Donna Brown |
| Iñez | mezzo-soprano | Hélène Jossoud |
| Hernan | tenor | Gilles Ragon |
| Bermudo | tenor | Jean-Paul Fouchécourt |
| Don Diègue | baritone | Jean-Philippe Courtis |
| Don Gomez | baritone | Jules Bastin |
| Le Roi | bass | Vincent Le Texier |
| Don Juan d'Arcos | tenor | |
| Don Pèdre de Terruel | tenor | |
Daughters of Bivar, Men of Gormaz, Men of Bivar, Servants and Servant-girls, Soldiers, Monks

== Synopsis ==
Time: 11th century
Place: Spain

=== Act 1 ===
Rodrigue, son of Don Diègue of Bivar, is engaged to marry Chimène, daughter of Don Gomez of Gormaz. They meet for a tryst just before dawn outside Don Gomez's house. They are interrupted by the arrival of the men of Gomez, singing a drinking song. The young women of Bivar also appear and the men of Gomez try to carry them off. They are stopped by an outraged Don Diègue. A quarrel breaks out between Don Diègue and Don Gomez, who objects to Diègue striking his servants. The two draw their swords but Don Diègue proves too old and weak to fight.

=== Act 2 ===
Rodrigue and his brothers are playing chess when they see an old beggar on the highway and offer him help. The "beggar" is Don Diègue and he demands, not alms, but the head of Don Gomez. He asks Rodrigue to avenge the slight on his honour by killing Chimène's father. Rodrigue reluctantly accepts the commission. Rodrigue challenges Don Gomez to a duel and fatally wounds him. Don Gomez dies in Chimène's arms, having told her the killer was her beloved.

=== Act 3 ===
King Ferdinand assembles his army for a campaign against the Moors. He notices that Don Gomez is missing from the ranks of his warriors. Chimène steps forward and begs for justice for her dead father, but Don Diègue pleads equally passionately for the life of the son who has restored his honour. The king sends for Rodrigue. Chimène confesses to her maidservant Iňez that she still loves him, but family honour demands he should die. The grief-stricken Rodrigue tells Chimène she should kill him with the selfsame sword that slew her father. She is unable to strike him, but unable to forgive him. He asks one of the king's soldiers to kill him instead. Don Diègue tells Rodrigue he must live so he can fight and defeat the Moors. Rodrigue reluctantly agrees, hoping to be killed in battle.

== Recording ==
- Rodrigue et Chimène (Denisov completion) Donna Brown, Laurence Dale, José van Dam, Choeur et Orchestre de l'Opéra de Lyon, conducted by Kent Nagano (Erato, 1995)
