= Cyril Huvé =

French classical pianist

Cyril Huvé (born 9 February 1954) is a French classical pianist.

== Biography ==
Born in Paris, Huvé was a pupil of Claudio Arrau. He also subsequently worked under the leadership of György Cziffra, in frequent - and free - private lessons at the Cziffra foundation of Senlis.

Winner of the 2010 Victoire de la musique for his CD of works for piano by Mendelssohn on an 1840 Broadwood piano, Huvé was particularly interested in the expressive possibilities of the romantic 19th century keyboards that his masters passed on to him. A pianoforte specialist, his experience in instrument knowledge has helped to integrate the notion of historically informed interpretation into the works of a vast repertoire and the modern piano, which he approaches in the continuity of historical instruments, taking advantage of the experience they bring him and not in opposition to them.

Huvé has performed in numerous festivals and as soloist with orchestras such as the Staatskapelle Dresden and the Orchestra of the Age of Enlightenment.

A tour in the US and South America in 2012 - Bolivia, Mexico, Chile, Brazil gave him the opportunity of a recital in homage to Claudio Arrau at Chillán, his birthplace in Chile, a visit to the municipal cemetery where he is buried, and a sharing at the Museo interactivo Claudio Arrau where the library of his scores, his objects - including his famous silent keyboard - and his personal memories are preserved.

Invited in November 2013 for a recital in Tokyo Musashino, Huvé has long been the assistant of Gérard Frémy at the Conservatoire de Paris: he has contributed to the training of pianists such as Cédric Tiberghien, Ferenc Vizi, Alexandre Léger, Jérôme Ducros, Daria Fadeeva, Mara Dobrescu, Julien Lepape, Nicolas Stavy etc.

First trained by pianist André Krust, he then joined Dominique Merlet's class at the Conservatoire de Paris, with Jeanine Vieuxtemps as assistant. He also studied classical literature in Khâgne and obtained a bachelor's degree in Philosophy at the Paris Nanterre University. In the late 1970s and early 1980s, he created and produced on France Musique an interpretation archives program called the Vieilles Cires, then established the "Rencontres d’Arc-et-Senans and Cluny", where he invited flautist Marcel Moyse, and developed working and friendly relationships with musicians such as Maurice Bourgue, André Cazalet, Jean Mouillère, Gérard Caussé, Thierry Caens, the Talich Quartet, Eckart Haupt etc. with whom he has since played frequently in chamber music.

Huvé has contributed to some theoretical texts, translated and prefaced with Didier Alluard, the Chemins vers la nouvelle musique by Anton Webern (JC Lattès) and discussed with Pierre Bourdieu (in Questions de Sociologie, Éditions de Minuit).

Now residing in Berry in George Sand's native land, Huvé has assembled his collection of historical pianos in the Grange aux Pianos in Chassignolles, a musician's house and resource centre for performance research seminars, masterclasses and chamber music concerts.

Since 2016, he has been artistic director of the Châtellerault "Automne musical" festival.

== Discography ==
- Busoni's works for piano: Toccata, Sonatina seconda, Elégies, Carmen fantaisie... (Erato - 1985)
- Liszt's complete lieder. Erard piano 1850. With Ernst Haefliger (tenor), Guy de Mey (tenor), Philippe Huttenlocher (baritone), Donna Brown (soprano), Gabriele Schreckenbach (mezzo-soprano). (Adda coproduction Radio France).
- Schubert's Trout Quintet - Hummel's Quintet Op. 87. Erard pianoforte 1822, with the Hausmusik Ensemble: Monica Huggett (violin), Roger Chase (viola) Richard Lester (cello), Chi-chi Nwanoku (doublebasse) (EMI 1991, reissued by Virgin Classics)
- Chopin's 4 Scherzi, 4 Ballades. Pianoforte Pleyel 1827 and Erard 1837 (EMI 1992)
- Liszt's L’Album d’un voyageur (Switzerland). 1835 Braschoss piano (Euterpe, coproduction Radio Suisse Romande)
- Ligeti's Trio for violin, French horn and piano - Brahms's Trio for piano, violin and French horn, Op. 40. With André Cazalet (horn) Guy Comentale (violin) (Montaigne 1992 - Naïve)
- Schubert - Liszt's Le Chant du cygne, complete transcription. Steinway piano 1990 (Adès 1995)
- Liszt's Complete Paraphrases on Verdi's Operas. Erard piano 1850 (BNL 2001)
- Beethoven's Ten sonatas for pianoforte and violin. Johannes Schanz pianoforte 1815. With Jorja Fleezanis, violin. (CYPRES 2003)
- Romantic melodramas: Schumann, Schubert, Liszt. With Daniel Mesguich, narrator (Éditions des Femmes 2008)
- Mendelssohn's works for piano, Piano Broadwood 1840 (Paraty 2009)
