= Royal Gardens of Venice =

Park in Venice, Italy

- Giardini Reali di Venezia
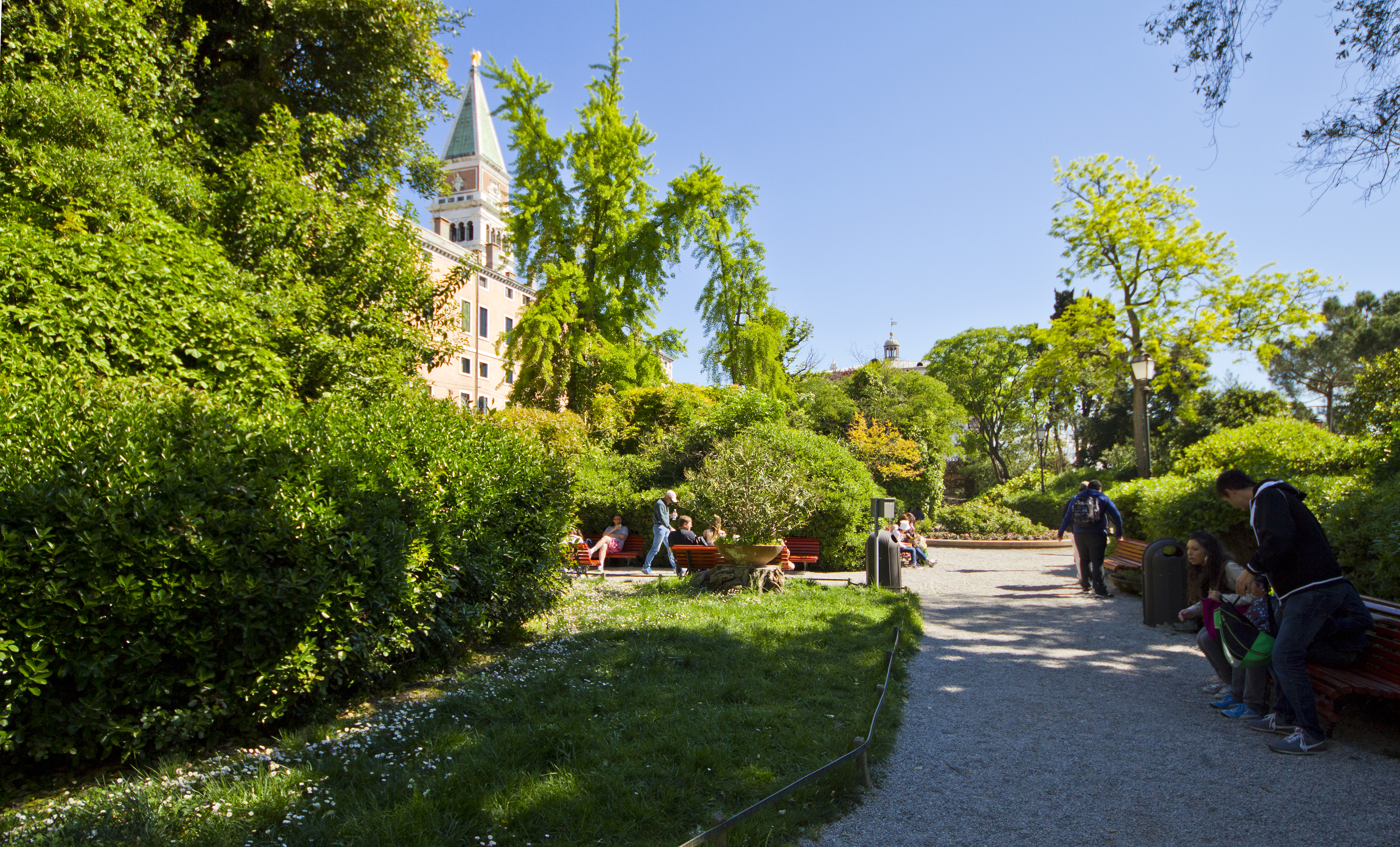
- Interactive map of Royal Gardens of Venice
- Type: Public park
- Location: Piazza San Marco, Venice, Italy
- Coordinates: 45.433°N 12.339°E
- Area: 5,500 m^{2} (1.4 acres)

The Royal Gardens of Venice (Italian: Giardini Reali di Venezia) is a park located between the Piazza San Marco and San Marco basin, in Venice, Italy.

== History ==
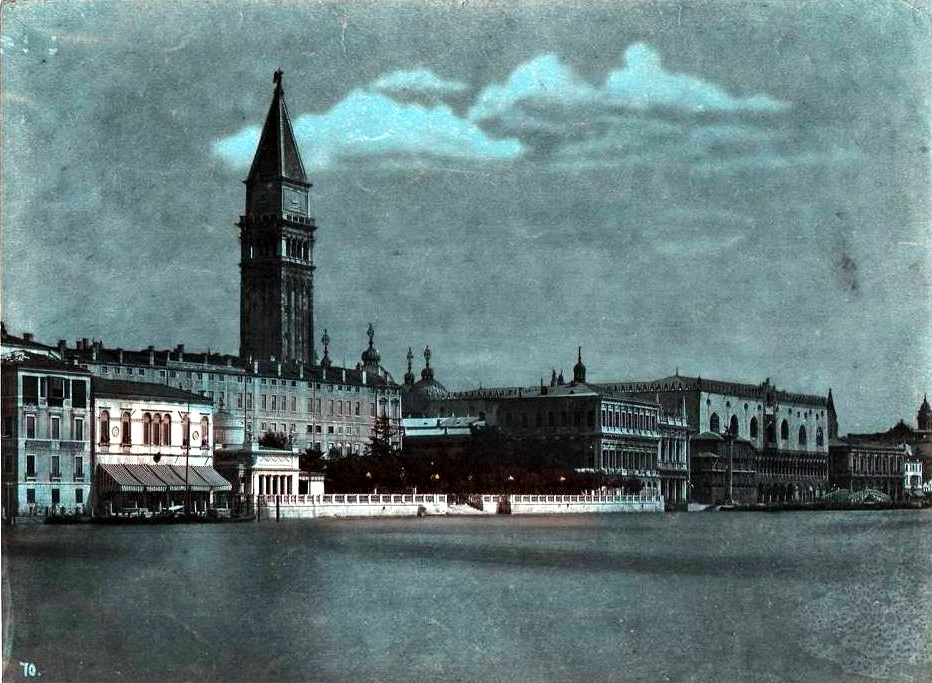
View of the gardens in the 19th century

The history of the Royal Gardens dates back to the project to reform the Marciana area desired by Napoleon: in 1806, Bonaparte and the viceroy Eugène de Beauharnais used the new Procuratie at the Royal Palace, so architect Giovanni Antonio Antolini created the first plans for the residence with a garden to be laid out on the land overlooking the San Marco basin, already occupied by the Granai di Terra Nova, a Gothic building built in 1340 and once used as a location for the grain market and for small shops.
