= Cédric Pescia =

French musician

- Born: 1976 (age 48–49)
- Occupation: Pianist
- Instrument: Piano
- Website: cedric-pescia.com

Cédric Pescia (born 1976) is a pianist. He is a dual citizen of France and Switzerland.

== Biography ==
Pescia studied at the Conservatoire de Musique in Lausanne, the Conservatoire de Musique in Geneva, the Universität der Künste in Berlin, and the International Piano Academy Lake Como in Italy.

== Career ==
Cédric Pescia won First Prize at the 2002 Gina Bachauer International Artists Piano Competition, and has toured throughout Europe, South America, and the USA. He is a founding member and the artistic director of the Lausanne chamber music series Ensemble en Scène. He regularly teaches master classes in the US and Europe, including at the Accademia Pianistica Internazionale “Incontri col Maestro” in Imola, Italy.

== Discography ==
- Beethoven: Piano Sonatas Op. 109, 110 & 111 (2009, Claves Records)
- Works by Busoni & Enescu (2008, Claves Records)
- Les Folies françaises (2008, Claves Records)
- R. Schumann: The Complete Works for Piano, Vol.2 (2006, Claves Records)
- Bach: Goldberg Variations (2004, Claves Records)
- J.S. Bach: Die Kunst der Fuge, BWV 1080 (2014, æon)

Pescia's recordings have received favorable reviews. International Record Review called Pescia's first album an “impressive début,” and Le Temps said “his first record is a master stroke.” Gramophone called Pescia an “outstandingly gifted pianist” and his recording of Schumann's complete works “vivacious, lucid and affectionate.”
