= List of compositions by Francis Poulenc =

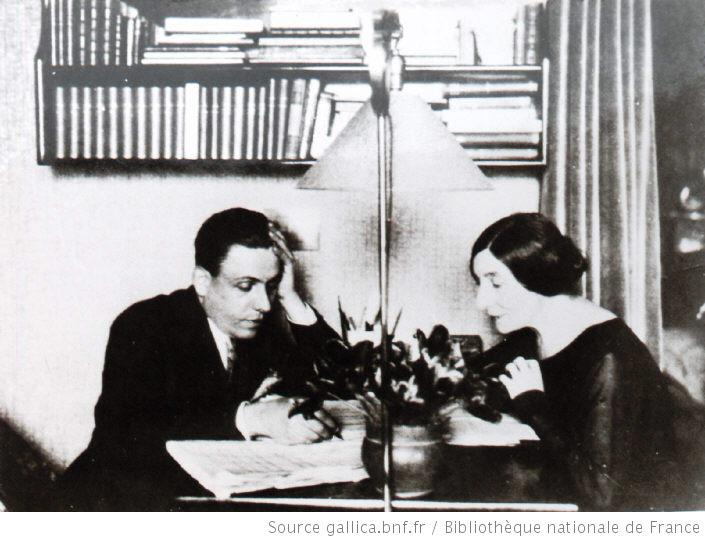
Poulenc and the harpsichordist Wanda Landowska in 1930

This is a list of works written by the French composer Francis Poulenc (1899–1963).

As a pianist, Poulenc composed many pieces for his own instrument in his piano music and chamber music. He wrote works for orchestra including several concertos, also three operas, two ballets, incidental music for plays and film music. He composed songs (mélodies), often on texts by contemporary authors. His religious music includes the Mass in G major, the Stabat Mater and Gloria.

== Overview ==
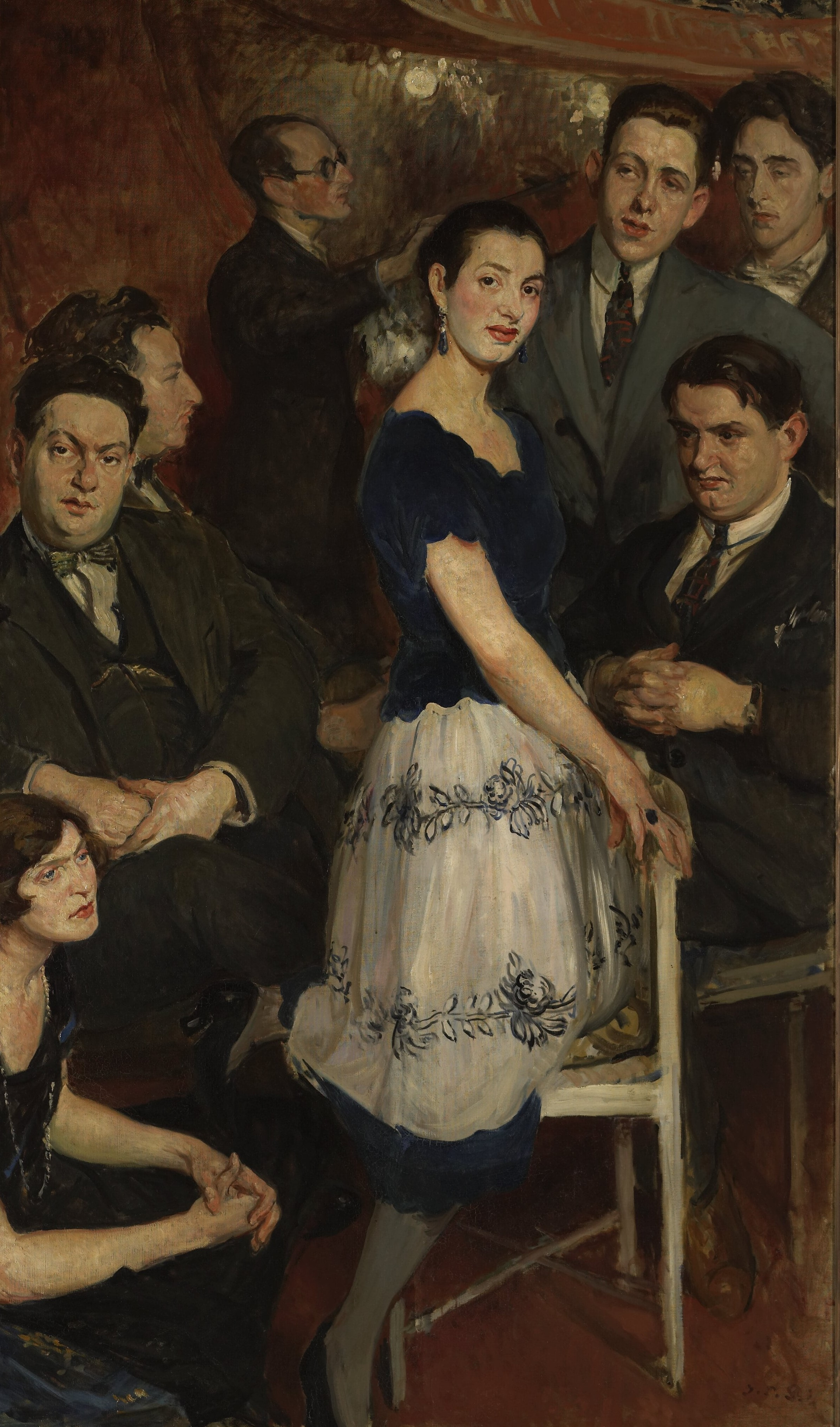
Le Groupe des six, 1921 painting of members of the group Les Six by Jacques-Émile Blanche. The pianist Marcelle Meyer is surrounded by (left) Tailleferre, Milhaud and Honegger, (right) Poulenc, Jean Cocteau, Auric and Jean Wiener, while Durey is missing.

The composer had written a catalogue of his works in 1921, which is reproduced in Schmidt's book. According to this list, the first noted piece was in 1914 Processional pour la crémation d'un mandarin for piano, now lost or destroyed. Poulenc completed his last work, his Oboe Sonata, in 1962.

Piano, chamber music and songs

As a professional pianist, Poulenc wrote many pieces for his own instrument. He was a prolific writer of works of chamber music, often with piano, and some works for two pianos. Poulenc composed many songs (mélodies), most of them accompanied by piano, but some also in versions with a small instrumental ensembles, for example his Rapsodie nègre for baritone, flute, clarinet, string quartet and piano. He composed easily for woodwind instruments, scoring for example a piano trio with oboe and bassoon instead of the traditional violin and cello. Poulenc was less familiar with string instruments. The cellist Pierre Fournier helped him to write the Cello Sonata, which he premiered with the composer as the pianist. Poulenc destroyed all sketches for string quartets and three for violin sonatas, while only the fourth one survived, but was received critically.

Orchestra and stage

Among his works with orchestra are three operas, two ballet, incidental music for plays, film music and concertos, some with unusual solo instruments such as harpsichord and organ. The harpsichordist Wanda Landowska inspired the composition of the Concert champêtre.

Collaboration in the group Les Six

Poulenc was a member of the group of composers Les Six, with Georges Auric, Louis Durey, Arthur Honegger, Darius Milhaud and Germaine Tailleferre, and contributed to their collective productions, which included another ballet.

Sacred music and choral music

Poulenc turned to writing also religious music in the 1930s, composing a Mass in G major for a cappella choir. He composed the Stabat Mater in 1950 in memory of the painter Christian Bérard in 1950. The late Gloria for soprano, choir and orchestra became one of his best-known works. He drew inspiration for his sacred compositions mostly from liturgical texts.

Songs

For his songs and song cycles, he often collaborated with contemporary poets, setting poems by writers such as Guillaume Apollinaire, Louis Aragon, Paul Éluard, Max Jacob, Federico García Lorca, and Louise de Vilmorin, whom he mentioned in titles. He further set poems by Théodore de Banville, Maurice Carême, Colette, Robert Desnos, Maurice Fombeure, Marie Laurencin, Madeleine Ley, François de Malherbe, Ronsard, Jean Moréas, Jean Nohain and Paul Valéry, among others. In 1943, during the occupation of France, a cantata Figure humaine on poems by Éluard which celebrate Liberté.

== List of works by FP number ==
The Music of Francis Poulenc (1899–1963): A Catalogue, abbreviated FP, is a chronological catalogue of Francis Poulenc's works which was published by Carl B. Schmidt in 1995. Schmidt provides for each known composition, which includes unfinished, unpublished and lost works, a detailed history of composition and performance, and lists manuscripts and publications.

In the table, the works are initially listed by the FP number. Other information given is the French title, a translation if commonly used, the key, the scoring if not clear from the title, the year(s) of composition, the genre, text information, notes and a free score when available, and the page number in the catalogue. Abbreviations used are "rev." for "revised", "orch." for "orchestration", arr. for "arrangement" and "sc." for "score".

In Genre, instrumental pieces are distinguished as orchestral and chamber music, particularly that for piano. The group of stage works contains operas, ballets and incidental music, while film scores are marked separately. Sacred and secular music for voice is divided in choral, for cantatas and motets, and vocal, holding songs and song cycles.

FP	Year	Title	Genre	Scoring	Text	Notes
1	1914	Processional pour la crémation d'un mandarin	piano			destroyed or lost p. 11
2	1916	Préludes	piano			destroyed
3	1917 (rev. 1933)	Rapsodie nègre	vocal	baritone; flute; clarinet; string quartet; piano	Makoko Kangourou (Marcel Prouille and Charles Moulié)	sc.
4	1917	Scherzo for two pianos Zèbre	piano			destroyed or lost (fragment)
5	1918	Trois Pastorales	piano			
6	1918	Poème sénégalais	vocal	voice; string quartet		destroyed or lost
7	1919	Sonata for two clarinets	chamber			dedicated to Édouard Souberbielle · sc.
7b	1925	Sonata	piano			piano version of FP 7
8	1918 (rev. 1939)	Sonata for piano 4 hands	piano			dedicated to Simone Tilliard · sc.
9	1918	Prélude-Percussion	solo	percussion		destroyed or lost
10	1918	Le Jongleur	piano			destroyed or lost
11	1918 (rev. 1932)	Toréador chanson hispano-italienne	vocal	voice; piano	Jean Cocteau	sc.
12	1918	Violin Sonata	chamber			destroyed or lost
13	1918	Sonata for piano trio	chamber			destroyed or lost
14a	1918 (rev. 1939, 1962)	Trois mouvements perpétuels	piano			sc. · p. 32
14b	1925 (rev. 1939, 1962)	Trois mouvements perpétuels	chamber	flute; oboe; clarinet; bassoon; french horn; violin; viola; cello; double bass		arr. of FP 14a
15a	1919	Le Bestiaire (ou Cortège d’Orphée): 1. "Le Dromadaire"; 2. "La Chèvre du Tibet"; 3. "La Sauterelle"; 4. "Le Dauphin"; 5. "L’Écrevisse"; 6. "La Carpe"	vocal	baritone; piano	Guillaume Apollinaire	sc.
15b	1922	Le Bestiaire (ou Cortège d’Orphée)	vocal	baritone; flute; clarinet; bassoon; string quartet		arr. of FP 15a
16a	1919	Cocardes: 1. Miel de Narbonne; 2. Bonne d'enfant 3. Enfant de troupe	vocal	soprano; piano	Cocteau	dedicated to Auric · sc.
16b	1939	Cocardes	vocal	soprano; violin; cornet; trombone; grosse caisse; triangle		arr. of FP 16a
17a	1919	Valse in C	piano			part of L'Album des Six · sc.
17b	1932	Valse in C	orchestral			orch. of FP 17a
18	1919	Quadrille for piano 4 hands	piano			lost or destroyed
19	1920 (rev. 1926)	Piano Suite	piano			sc.
20a	1920–21	Le Gendarme incompris	stage (opera)	3 voices; ensemble	Cocteau and Raymond Radiguet	lyric comedy in one act
20b	1921	Le Gendarme incompris (suite)	chamber	clarinet; trumpet; trombone; percussion; violin; cello; double bass		sc.
21	1920–21	5 Impromptus	piano			sc.
22	1921	Quatre poèmes de Max Jacob: 1. Est-il un coin plus solitaire...; 2. C'est pour aller au bal 3. Poète et Ténor; 4. Dans le buisson de mimosa	vocal	voice; wind quintet	Max Jacob	dedicated to Darius Milhaud
23/1	1921	La baigneuse de Trouville (Carte Postale en couleurs)	stage (ballet)	orchestra		part of the collaborative Les mariés de la tour Eiffel, ballet by Cocteau
23/2	1921	Discours du Général (Polka)	stage (ballet)	orchestra		part of the collaborative Les mariés de la tour Eiffel, ballet by Cocteau
24	1921 (rev. 1952)	Promenades	piano			sc.
25	1921	Esquisse pour une fanfare	orchestral			sc., overture for Act V of Shakespeare, Romeo and Juliet
26	1921	3 Etudes for pianola	piano			lost or destroyed
27	1921	Première suite d'orchestre	orchestral			lost or destroyed
28	1921	String Quartet no. 1	chamber			lost or destroyed
29	1921	Trio for piano, clarinet and cello	chamber			lost or destroyed
30	1921	Military marches for piano and orchestra	orchestral			lost or destroyed (fragments)
31	1922	Chanson à boire	choral	men's choir	anonymous texts of the 17th century, English by J. V. Hugo	sc.
32a	1922	Sonata for clarinet and bassoon	chamber			sc.
32b	1945	Sonata	piano			piano version of FP 32a
33a	1922	Sonata for horn, trumpet and trombone	chamber			
33b	1945	Sonata	piano			piano version of FP 33a
34	1922	Caprice espagnol	piano			lost or destroyed
35	1923	La colombe	stage (opera)			recitatives for Charles Gounod's opera
36	1922	Les biches	stage (ballet)			sc.
36b	1939–40	Les biches (Suite)	orchestral			from FP 36a
36c	1923	Les biches (Suite)	orchestral			from FP 36
37	1923	Clarinet Quintet	chamber			lost or destroyed
38a	1924–25	Poèmes de Pierre Ronsard: 1. Attributs; 2. Le Tombeau; 3. Ballet; 4. Je n’ai plus que les os 5. À son page	vocal	voice; piano	Pierre Ronsard	sc.
38b	1924–25	Poèmes de Pierre Ronsard	vocal	voice; orchestra		orch. of 38a
39	1924–25	Violin Sonata No. 2	chamber			lost or destroyed
40	1922–25	Napoli	piano			sc.
41	1925	Dorfmusikanten-Sextett von Mozart				lost or destroyed
42	1925	Chansons gaillardes: 1. La Maîtresse volage 2. Chanson à boire 3. Madrigal; 4. Invocations aux Parques; 5. Couplets bachiques 6. L’Offrande; 7. La Belle jeunesse 8. Sérénade	vocal	baritone; piano		sc.
43	1926	Trio for oboe, bassoon and piano	chamber			sc.
44	1927	Vocalise	vocal	voice; piano		
45	1927	Pastourelle	stage (ballet)	orchestra		part of the collaborative L'Éventail de Jeanne by ten composers
45b	1927	Pastourelle	piano			piano version of FP 45a, sc.
46	1927–28	Airs chantés: 1. Air romantique 2. Air champêtre 3. Air grave 4. Air vif	vocal	voice; piano	Jean Moréas	sc.
47	1927–28 (rev. 1939)	Novelettes	piano			sc.
48	1928 (rev. 1953)	3 Pieces	piano			sc.
49	1927–29	Concert champêtre	orchestral	harpsichord; orchestra		sc.
50a	1929	Pièce brève sur le nom d'Albert Roussel	piano			No. 3 of the collaborative Hommage à Roussel (2 mélodies and 6 pièces for piano by Conrad Beck, Roger Delage, Arthur Honegger, Arthur Hoérée, Jacques Ibert, Darius Milhaud and Alexandre Tansman) published in addition to the Revue musicale (April 1929)
50b	1949	Pièce brève sur le nom d'Albert Roussel	orchestral			orch. of FP 50a
51a	1929	Aubade, concerto chorégraphique	stage (ballet)	piano; 18 instruments		sc
51b	1929	Aubade	piano			piano version of FP 51a
52	1929	Fanfare				lost or destroyed
53	1929	Valse	piano			lost or destroyed
54	1929	Violin Sonata No. 3	chamber			lost or destroyed
55	1930	Épitaphe	vocal	voice (baritone or mezzo-soprano); piano	François de Malherbe	sc.
56	1929–30	8 Nocturnes	piano			sc.
57	1931	Trois poèmes de Louise Lalanne: 1. Le Présent; 2. Chanson; 3. Hier	vocal	voice (soprano); piano	Louise Lalanne	sc.
58	1931	Quatre poèmes de Guillaume Apollinaire: 1. L'Anguille; 2. Carte postale 3. Avant le cinéma 4. 1904	vocal	voice (baritone or mezzo-soprano); piano	Apollinaire	sc.
59	1931	Cinq poèmes de Max Jacob: 1. Chanson bretonne 2. Le Cimetière; 3. La Petite servante 4. Berceuse; 5. Souric et Mouric	vocal	voice; piano	Jacob	sc.
60	1932	Le Bal masqué	vocal	voice (baritone or mezzo-soprano); chamber orchestra	Jacob	composed for Marie-Laure and Charles de Noailles · sc.
60.I	1932	Caprice	piano			piano version of Final from FP 60
60.II	1932	Intermède	piano			from FP 60.I
60.III	1932	Bagatelle	chamber			excerpts from FP 60.I
61	1932	Concerto for Two Pianos and Orchestra	orchestral			sc.
62	1932	Valse-improvisation sur le nom de BACH	piano			No. 3 of the collaborative Hommage à J. S. Bach (with Albert Roussel, Alfredo Casella, Gian Francesco Malipiero and Arthur Honegger), sc.
63	1932–34	10 Improvisations	piano			sc.
64	1933	Intermezzo	stage (incidental)			incidental music for Jean Giraudoux's play
65	1933	Villageoises 6 petites pièces enfantines	piano			sc.
66	1932	Pierrot	vocal	voice; piano	Théodore de Banville	
67	1932	Petrus				lost or destroyed
68	1933	Feuillets d’album	piano			sc.
69	1934	Huit chansons polonaises: 1. La Couronne; 2. Le Départ; 3. Les Gars polonais 4. Le Dernier Mazour; 5. L'Adieu; 6. Le Drapeau blanc 7. La Vistule; 8. Le Lac	vocal	voice; piano	anonymous in French and Polish	sc.
70	1934	Presto in B♭ major	piano			dedicated to Vladimir Horowitz · sc.
71	1934	2 Intermezzi	piano			sc.
72	1934	Humoresque	piano			
73	1934	Badinage	piano			
74	1934	Villanelle	chamber	recorder; piano		dedicated to Louise Hanson-Dyer
75	1934–35	Quatre chansons pour enfants: 1. Nous voulons une petite sœur 2. La Tragique Histoire du petit René; 3. Le Petit Garçon trop bien portant 4. Monsieur Sans-souci	vocal	voice; piano	Jean Nohain	
76	1936	La Belle au bois dormant	film	harpsichord; wind instruments; harp; percussion		music for the commercial film by Alexandre Alexeieff
77	1935	Cinq poèmes de Paul Éluard: 1. Peut-il se reposer?; 2. Il la prend dans ses bras 3. Plume d’eau claire 4. Rôdeuse au front de verre 5. Amoureuses	vocal	voice; piano	Paul Éluard	sc.
78	1935	La Reine Margot	stage (incidental))	voice; piano		incidental music for Édouard Bourdet's play, in collaboration with Auric
79a	1935	À sa guitare	vocal	voice; piano or harp	Ronsard	after FP 78 · sc
79b	1935	À sa guitare	vocal	voice; orchestra		orch. of 79a
80a	1935	Suite française d'après Claude Gervaise	chamber	wind instruments; drum; harpsichord		sc.
80b	1935	Suite française	piano			piano version of Fp80a
81	1936	Sept Chansons: 1. Blanche Neige; 2. À peine défigurée 3. Par une nuit nouvelle 4. Tous les droits 5. Belle et ressemblante 6. Marie; 7. Luire	choral	choir	1 & 6: Apollinaire; 2–5 & 7: Éluard	sc.
82a	1936	Litanies à la Vierge Noire Notre-Dame de Rocamadour	choral	women's (or children's) choir; organ		sc.
82b	1947	Litanies à la Vierge Noire	choral	women's (or children's) choir; orchestra (strings and timpani)		orch. of FP 82a
83	1936	Petites Voix: 1. La Petite Fille sage 2. Le Chien perdu 3. En rentrant de l'école 4. Le Petit garçon malade 5. Le Hérisson	choral	3-part women's (or children's) choir	Madeleine Ley	
84	1930–36	Soirées de Nazelles	piano			sc.
85	1936	Plains-chants de Cocteau	vocal	voice; piano		lost or destroyed
86	1936–37	Tel jour, telle nuit: 1. Bonne journée 2. Une ruine coquille vide 3. Le Front comme un drapeau perdu 4. Une roulotte couverte en tuiles 5. À toutes brides 6. Une herbe pauvre 7. Je n’ai envie que de t’aimer 8. Figure de force brûlante et farouche 9. Nous avons fait la nuit	vocal	voice; piano	Éluard	sc.
87	1937	Bourrée, au pavillon d’Auvergne	piano			part of the collaborative À l’exposition, 1937 · sc.
88	1937	Deux marches et un intermède	orchestral			sc.
89	1937	Mass in G major	choral	soprano; mixed choir		sc. · p. 288
90	1937	Sécheresses	choral	mixed choir (SATB); orchestra	Edward James	sc.
91	1937	Trois poèmes de Louise de Vilmorin: 1. Le Garçon de Liège; 2. Au-delà; 3. Aux officiers de la garde blanche	vocal	voice; piano	Louise de Vilmorin	
92	1938	Le Portrait	vocal	voice; piano	Colette	
93	1934–38	Organ Concerto	orchestral	organ; timpani; string orchestra		
94	1938	Deux poèmes de Guillaume Apollinaire: 1. Dans le jardin d'Anna; 2. Allons plus vite	vocal	voice; piano	Apollinaire	sc.
95	1938	Priez pour paix	vocal	voice; piano	Charles d'Orléans	sc.
96	1938	La Grenouillère	vocal	voice; piano	Apollinaire	sc.
97	1938–39	Quatre motets pour un temps de pénitence: 1. Timor et tremor 2. Vinea mea electa 3. Tenebræ factæ sunt 4. Tristis est anima mea	choral	mixed choir		sc. · p. 288–292
98	1938–39	Miroirs brûlants: 1. Tu vois le feu du soir 2. Je nommerai ton front	vocal	voice; piano	Éluard	sc. · p. 293–294
99	1939	Ce doux petit visage	vocal	voice; piano	Éluard	sc.
100	1932 (rev. 1939–40)	Sextet	chamber	wind quintet; piano		sc.
101	1939	Fiançailles pour rire: 1. La Dame d’André; 2. Dans l’herbe 3. Il vole 4. Mon cadavre est doux comme un gant 5. Violon; 6. Fleurs	vocal	voice; piano	Vilmorin	
102	1939	Bleuet	vocal	voice; piano	Apollinaire	
103	1939	Française	piano			sc.
104	1939	Deux préludes posthumes et une gnossienne	orchestral	chamber orchestra		orch. of pieces by Erik Satie
105	1940	Mélancolie	piano			sc.
106	1940	Léocadia	stage (incidental)			incidental music for Jean Anouilh's play · lost but for FP 106-Ia
106-Ia	1940	Les Chemins de l'amour	vocal	voice; piano	Jean Anouilh	sung waltz from FP 106 · sc.
106-Ib	1940	Les Chemins de l'amour	vocal	voice; clarinet; bassoon; violin; double bass; piano		orch. of FP 106-Ia
107	1940	Banalités: 1. Chanson d’Orkenise; 2. Hôtel; 3. Fagnes de Wallonie; 4. Voyage à Paris; 5. Sanglots	vocal	voice; piano	Apollinaire	sc.
108	1940	Colloque	vocal	voice (soprano, baritone); piano	Paul Valéry	
109	1941	Exultate Deo	choral	4-part choir		sc.
110	1941	Salve Regina	choral	4-part choir		sc.
111a	1940–41	Les Animaux modèles	stage (ballet)			
111b	1942	Les Animaux modèles (Suite)	orchestral			six movements from FP 111a
112	1941	La Fille du jardinier	stage (incidental)			incidental music for Charles Exbrayat's play
113	1941	2 Improvisations	piano			sc.
114	1941	Un joueur de flûte berce les ruines	chamber	flute		unpublished
115	1941	String Trio	chamber			lost or destroyed
116	1942	La Duchesse de Langeais	film			music for the film by Jacques de Baroncelli, adapted from Honoré de Balzac's novel by Jean Giraudoux
117a	1942	Chansons villageoises: 1. Chanson du Clair Tamis; 2. Les Gars qui vont à la fête 3. C’est le joli printemps 4. Le Mendiant; 5. Chanson de la fille frivole 6. Le Retour du sergent	vocal	voice; piano	Maurice Fombeure	
117b	1942	Chansons villageoises	vocal	voice (baritone); chamber orchestra		orch. of FP 117a
118	1943	3 Intermezzi	piano			sc.
119	1942–43 (rev. 1949)	Violin Sonata	chamber			sc. · p. 330–332
120	1943	Figure humaine: 1. Bientôt; 2. Le rôle des femmes 3. Aussi bas que les silence 4. Patience; 5. Première marche; la voix d’un autre 6. Un loup 7. Un feu sans tache 8. Liberté	choral	12-part choir	Éluard	p. 333–335
121	1943	Métamorphoses: 1. Reine des mouettes 2. C'est ainsi que tu es 3. Paganini	vocal	voice; piano	Vilmorin	
122	1943	Deux poèmes de Louis Aragon: 1. C 2. Fêtes galantes	vocal	voice; piano	Louis Aragon	
123	1943	Le Voyageur sans bagage	film			music for the film by Jean Anouilh
124	1944	La Nuit de la Saint-Jean	stage (incidental)			incidental music for the play by J. M. Barrie
125	1944	Les Mamelles de Tirésias	stage (opera)	soloists; choir; orchestra	Apollinaire	sc.
126	1944	Un soir de neige: 1. Le feu 2. Un loup 3. Derniers instants 4. Du dehors	choral	4-6-part mixed choir	Éluard	sc.
127	1941–45	Deux mélodies de Guillaume Apollinaire: 1. Montparnasse; 2. Hyde Park	vocal	voice; piano	Apollinaire	
128	1945	Le Soldat et la Sorcière	stage (incidental)			incidental music for the play by Armand Salacrou
129	1940–45	L'Histoire de Babar, le petit éléphant	vocal	narrator; piano	Jean de Brunhoff	orch. by Jean Françaix, sc.
130	1945	Huit chansons françaises: 1. "Margoton va t'a l'iau" 2. "La Belle se sied au pied de la tour" 3. "Pilons l'orge" 4. "Clic, clac, dansez sabots" 5. "C'est la petit' fill' du prince" 6. "La Belle si nous étions" 7. "Ah ! mon beau laboureur" 8. "Les Tisserands"	choral	mixed choir; men's choir		sc.
131	1946	Deux mélodies sur des poèmes de Guillaume Apollinaire: 1. Le Pont; 2. Un poème	vocal	voice; piano	Apollinaire	
132	1946	Paul et Virginie	vocal	voice; piano	Raymond Radiguet	sc.
133	1946	String Quartet no. 2	chamber			lost or destroyed
134	1947	Le Disparu	vocal	voice; piano	Robert Desnos	
135	1947	Main dominée par le cœur	vocal	voice (soprano); piano	Éluard	sc.
136	1947	Trois chansons de Federico García Lorca: 1. L’Enfant muet 2. Adeline à la promenade 3. Chanson à l’oranger sec	vocal	voice; piano	Federico García Lorca	
137	1947	Mais mourir	vocal	voice; piano	Éluard	
138	1947	L'Invitation au château	stage (incidenal)			incidental music for Jean Anouilh's play
139	1947	Amphitryon	stage (incidental)			incidental music for Molière's 1668 play for the compagnie Renaud-Barrault at the théâtre Marigny
140	1948	Calligrammes: 1. L’Espionne; 2. Mutation; 3. Vers le Sud; 4. Il pleut 5. La Grâce exilée 6. Aussi bien que les cigales 7. Voyage	vocal	voice; piano	Apollinaire	
141	1947	Sinfonietta	orchestral			sc.
142	1948	Quatre petites prières de saint François d’Assise: 1. Salut, dame Sainte; 2. Tout puissant, très saint 3. Seigneur, je vous en prie 4. Ô mes très chers frères	choral	4-part men's choir	Francis of Assisi	sc.
143	1940–48 (rev. 1953)	Cello Sonata	chamber			sc. · p. 393–395
144	1947	Hymne	vocal	voice (bass); piano	Jean Racine	sc.
145	1949	Les Bijoux de poitrine, mazurka	vocal	voice; piano	Vilmorin	part of the collaborative song cycle Les Mouvements du cœur in memory of Frédéric Chopin, with Darius Milhaud, Henri Sauguet, Auric, Jean Françaix and Léon Preger, premiered by bass Doda Conrad
146	1949	Piano Concerto	orchestral			sc.
147	1950	La Fraîcheur et le Feu: 1. Rayon des yeux 2. Le matin les branches attisent 3. Tout disparut 4. Dans les ténèbres du jardin 5. Unis la fraîcheur et le feu 6. Homme au sourire tendre 7. La Grande rivière qui va	vocal	voice; piano	Éluard	
148	1950–51	Stabat Mater	choral	soprano; five-part choir; orchestra		sc.
149	1951	Le Voyage en Amérique	piano	2 pianos		music for the film by Henri Lavorel
150	1951	L'Embarquement pour Cythère	piano	2 pianos		Valse musette after FP 149 · sc.
151	1951	Thème varié	piano			sc.
152	1951–52	Quatre motets pour le temps de Noël: 1. O magnum mysterium 2. Quem vidistis pastores dicite 3. Videntes stellam 4. Hodie Christus natus est	choral	4-part choir		sc. · p. 417–419
153	1952	Matelote provençale	orchestral			part of the collaborative La guirlande de Campra
154	1952	Ave verum corpus	choral	3-part women's chorus		sc.
155	1952	Capriccio	piano	2 pianos		after Le Bal masqué FP 60, dedicated to Samuel Barber
156	1953	Sonate for two pianos	piano			
157	1954	Parisiana: 1. Jouer du bugle 2. Vous n'écrivez plus?	vocal	voice; piano	Jacob	sc.
158	1954	Rosemonde	vocal	voice; piano	Apollinaire	sc.
159	1956	Dialogues of the Carmelites	stage (opera)	soloists; choir; orchestra	Georges Bernanos	sc.
160	1954	Bucolique	orchestral			part of the collaborative Variations sur le nom de Marguerite Long
161	1956	Le Travail du peintre: 1. Pablo Picasso; 2. Marc Chagall; 3. Georges Braque; 4. Juan Gris; 5. Paul Klee; 6. Joan Miró; 7. Jacques Villon	vocal	voice; piano	Éluard	
162	1956	Two mélodies: 1. "La Souris"; 2. "Nuage"	vocal	voice; piano	1: Apollinaire, 2: Laurence de Beylié	
163	1956	Dernier Poème	vocal	voice; piano	Desnos	sc.
164	1956–57	Flute Sonata	chamber			sc.
165	1957	Ave Maria				lost or destroyed
166	1957	Bassoon Sonata	chamber			lost or destroyed
167	1956	Vive Nadia	vocal	voice; piano		homage to Nadia Boulanger
168	1957	Élégie pour cor et piano	chamber			homage to Dennis Brain
169	1956	Une chanson de porcelaine	vocal	voice; piano	Éluard	
170	1958	Improvisation 13–14	piano			sc.
171	1958	La voix humaine	stage (opera)	soprano; orchestra	Cocteau	sc.
172	1957–59	Laudes de saint Antoine de Padoue: 1. O Jesu; 2. O Proles; 3. Laus Regi; 4. Si quaeris	choral	3-part men's choir		sc.
173	1958–59	Novelette	piano			sc.
174	1959	Fancy	vocal	voice; piano	after Shakespeare's The Merchant of Venice	sc.
175	1959	Elegy for 2 pianos	piano			homage to Marguerite de Polignac (called Marie-Blanche) · sc.
176	1959	Improvisation 15	piano			homage to Édith Piaf · sc.
177	1959	Gloria	choral	soprano; choir; orchestra		sc.
178	1960	La Courte Paille: 1. Le Sommeil; 2. Quelle aventure!; 3. La Reine de cœur 4. Ba, be, bi, bo, bu 5. Les Anges musiciens 6. Le Carafon; 7. Lune d’avril	vocal	voice; piano	Maurice Carême	
179	1960	Sarabande for guitar	chamber			dedicated to Ida Presti · sc.
180	1961	La Dame de Monte-Carlo	vocal	voice (soprano); piano	Cocteau	
181	1961	Sept répons des ténèbres	choral	voice; piano		sc.
182	1961	Nos souvenirs qui chantent	vocal	voice; piano	Tatry	
183	1962	Renaud et Armide	stage (incidental)			incidental music for Cocteau's 1943 play
184	1962	Clarinet Sonata	chamber			sc.
185	1962	Oboe Sonata	chamber			sc.
??	1950	Ce siècle a cinquante ans	film	orchestra		music for the documentary directed by Denise Batcheff, Roland Tual and Werner Malbran, composed in collaboration with Auric, Henri Sauguet and Jean Wiener

== List of works by genre ==
Poulenc in the early 1920s

=== Stage works ===
==== Ballet ====
- Les mariés de la tour Eiffel, ballet (1921; a collaborative work by all the members of Les Six except Louis Durey); Poulenc's contributions, Discours du General (Polka) and La Baigneuse de Trouville are listed as FP 23 in Schmidt's Poulenc catalog.
- Les biches, ballet (1922/23), FP 36
- Pastourelle (1927; for the children's ballet L'éventail de Jeanne, to which ten French composers each contributed a dance; this excerpt became better known in its piano transcription), FP 45
- Les animaux modèles, ballet (1941), FP 111

==== Opera ====
- Les mamelles de Tirésias, opera (1947), FP 125
- Dialogues of the Carmelites, opera (1957) Composed 1953–56, FP 159
- La voix humaine, monodrama (1959), FP 171

=== Orchestral ===
- Sinfonietta, FP 141 (1947)
- "Matelote provençale", variation for La guirlande de Campra, FP 153 (1952)
- "Bucolique" for Variations sur le nom de Marguerite Long, FP 160 (1954)

==== Concertante ====
- Concert champêtre, for harpsichord and orchestra, (1927–1928), FP 49
- Aubade, a "Concerto choréographique" for piano and 18 instruments, FP 51 (1929)
- Concerto for two pianos and orchestra in D minor (1932), FP 61
- Concerto for organ, strings and timpani in G minor (1938), FP 93
- Concerto for piano and orchestra (1949) FP 146

=== Vocal/choral orchestral ===
- Le bal Masqué, secular cantata on poems by Max Jacob (Baritone or mezzo soprano, ensemble) (1932), FP 60
- Sécheresses (SATB, orchestra) (1939), FP 90
- Litanies à la Vierge Noire (SSA, org) (1936), orchestrated (1947), FP 82
- Stabat Mater (Soprano solo, SATB divisi, orchestra) (1950), FP 148
- Gloria (Soprano solo, SATB divisi, orchestra) (1959), FP 177
- La dame de Monte-Carlo (Soprano solo, orchestra) (1961), FP 180
- Sept répons des ténèbres (Child Soprano, Men's Chorus, Children's Chorus, orchestra) (1961–62), FP 181

=== Chamber/Instrumental ===
- Rapsodie nègre, for flute, clarinet, string quartet, baritone and piano, FP 3 (1917)
- Sonata for two clarinets, FP 7 (1918/1945)
- Trois mouvements perpétuels for 9 instruments, FP 14 (1946)
- Sonata for clarinet and bassoon, FP 32 (1922/1945)
- Sonata for horn, trumpet and trombone, FP 33 (1922/1945)
- Trio for oboe, bassoon and piano, FP 43 (1926)
- Bagatelle in D minor for violin and piano, FP 60c (1932)
- Villanelle for pipe (pipeau) and piano, FP 74 (1934)
- Suite française for 2 oboes, 2 bassoons, 2 trumpets, 3 trombones, percussion and harpsichord, FP 80 (1935)
- Sextet for piano and wind quintet, FP 100 (1932–9)
- Un joueur de flûte berce les ruines, for flute (1942)
- Violin Sonata, FP 119 (1942–3/1949)
- L'Invitation au Chateau, FP 138 (1947)
- Cello Sonata, FP 143 (1940–48)
- Flute Sonata, FP 164 (1956–7)
- Élégie for horn and piano, FP 168 (1957) In memory of Dennis Brain
- Sarabande for guitar, FP 179 (1960)
- Clarinet Sonata, FP 184 (1962)
- Oboe Sonata, FP 185 (1962)

=== Piano ===
==== Piano four hands ====
- Sonata for piano, 4 hands, FP 8

==== Two pianos ====
- Sonata for 2 pianos, FP 156
- L'embarquement pour Cythère, valse-musette for 2 pianos (from film, Le voyage en Amérique), FP 150
- Élégie (en accords alternés), for 2 pianos, FP 175
- Capriccio for 2 pianos (after Le bal Masqué), FP 155

=== Choral ===
- Chanson à boire (TTBB) (1922), FP 31
- Sept chansons (SATB) (1936), FP 81
- Litanies à la vierge noire (SSA, org) (1936), orchestrated (1947), FP 82
- Les Petites voix (SSA a cappella) (1936) FP 83 (Madeleine Ley) (I. La Petite Fille sage; II. Le Chien perdu; III. En rentrant de l'école; IV. Le Petit garçon malade; V. Le Hérisson)
- Mass in G (SATB) (1937), FP 89
- Sécheresses (chorus, orchestra) (1937), FP 90
- Quatre motets pour un temps de pénitence (SATB): "Vinea mea electa", (1938); "Tenebrae factae sunt", (1938); "Tristis est anima mea", (1938); "Timor et tremor", (1939), FP 97
- Exultate Deo (SATB) (1941), FP 109
- Salve Regina (SATB) (1941), FP 110
- Figure humaine (12 voices) (1943), FP 120
- Un soir de neige (6 voices) (1944), FP 126
- Chansons françaises: "Margoton va t'a l'iau", (SATB)(1945); "La belle se sied au pied de la tour" (SATBarB) (1945); "Pilons l'orge" (SATBarB) (1945); "Clic, clac, dansez sabots" (TBB) (1945); "C'est la petit' fill' du prince" (SATBarB) (1946); "La belle si nous étions" (TBB) (1946); "Ah! Mon beau laboureur" (SATB) (1945); "Les tisserands" (SATBarB) (1946), FP 130
- Quatre petites prières de saint François d’Assise (Men's chorus) (1948), FP 142
- Quatre motets pour le temps de Noël (Mixed chorus): "O magnum mysterium" (1952); "Quem vidistis pastores?" (1951); "Videntes stellam" (1951); "Hodie Christus natus est" (1952), FP 152
- Ave verum corpus (SMezA) (1952), FP 154
- Laudes de Saint Antoine de Padoue (Men's Chorus): "O Jésu perpetua lux" (1957); "O proles hispaniae" (1958); "Laus regi plena gaudio" (1959); "Si quaeris" (1959), FP 172

=== Vocal ===
- Rapsodie nègre: see Chamber/Instrumental, above.
- Toréador chanson hispano-italienne (poem by Jean Cocteau) (1918, revised 1932) FP 11
- Le Bestiaire, ou le Cortège d'Orphée pour Baryton et Orchestre de Chambre, FP 15a (poems by Apollinaire) (I: Le dromadaire II: La chèvre du Thibet III: La sauterelle IV: Le dauphin V: L'écrevisse VI: La carpe) (1918–1919)
- Le Bestiaire, ou le Cortège d'Orphée pour Baryton et Piano, Trois Melodies Inedites (VII La Colombe, VIII Le Serpent, IX La Puce), FP 15b
- Cinq poèmes de Max Jacob (I:"Chanson Bretonne" II:"Cimetière" III:"La petite servante" IV:"Berceuse" V:"Souric et Mouric") (1931), FP 52
- Miroirs Brûlants (2 Poems by Paul Eluard. I:"Tu vois le feu du soir" II:"Je nommerai ton front") (1938), FP 98
- Poèmes de Ronsard (I:"Attributs", II: "Le tombeau", III: "Ballet", IV: "Je n'ai plus les os", V: "À son page") (1925), FP 38
- Chansons Gaillardes (anonymous 17th-century texts, I:"La Maîtresse volage", II: "Chanson à boire", III: "Madrigal", IV: "Invocation aux Parques", V: "Couplets bachiques", VI: "L'Offrande", VII: "La Belle Jeunesse", VIII: "Sérénade") (1925–1926), FP 42
- Quatre airs chantés (I:"Air romantique", II: "Air champêtre", III: "Air grave", IV: "Air vif") (1927–28), FP 46
- Quatre poèmes de Guillaume Apollinaire (1931, FP 58) for voice and piano (I. L'Anguille; II. Carte postale; III. Avant le cinéma; IV. 1904)
- A sa guitare (poem by Pierre de Ronsard) (1935), FP 79
- Tel jour, telle nuit (poems by Paul Éluard), I: "Bonne journée", II: "Une ruine coquille vide", III. "Le front comme un drapeau perdu", IV. "Une roulotte couverte en tuiles", V. "A toutes brides", VI. "Une herbe pauvre", VII. "Je n'ai envie que de t'aimer", VIII. "Figure de force brûlante et farouche", IX. "Nous avons fait la nuit" (1936–1937), FP 86
- Le portrait (poem by Colette) (1937), FP 92
- Priez pour paix (poem by Charles d'Orléans) (1938), FP 95
- La grenouillère (poem by Apollinaire) (1938), FP 96
- Deux poèmes de Guillaume Apollinaire (poems by Apollinaire: I: "Dans le jardin d'Anna", II: "Allons plus vite") (1939), FP 94
- Bleuet (poem by Apollinaire) (1939), FP 102
- Fiançailles pour rire (poems by Louise de Vilmorin: I: "La Dame d'André", II: "Dans l'herbe", III: "Il vole", IV: "Mon cadavre est doux comme un gant", V: "Violon", VI: "Fleurs") (1939), FP 101
- Banalités (poems by Apollinaire: I: "Chanson d'Orkenise", II: "Hôtel", III: "Fagnes de Wallonie", IV: "Voyage à Paris", V: "Sanglots") (1940), FP 107
- "Les Chemins de l'amour" (originally written as part of the incidental music for Jean Anouilh's Léocadia (1940); the remainder of the Léocadia music is lost.), FP 106
- Chansons villageoises (I: "Chanson du clair tamis", II: "Les gars qui vont à la fête", III: "C'est le joli printemps", IV: "Le mendiant", V: "Chanson de la fille frivole", VI: "Le retour du sergent"), FP 117 (1942)
- Deux poèmes de Louis Aragon (I: "C", II: "Fêtes galantes") (1943), FP 122
- Métamorphoses (1943) FP 121 for voice and piano (Louise de Vilmorin) (I. Reine des mouettes; II. C'est ainsi que tu es; III. Paganini)
- L'Histoire de Babar, le petit éléphant for Piano and Narrator (1940 – orchestrated by Jean Françaix 1945), FP 142
- Deux mélodies de Guillaume Apollinaire (I: "Montparnasse", II: "Hyde Park") (1941–1945), FP 127
- Deux poèmes d'Apollinaire (I: "Le pont", II: "Un poème") (1946), FP 131
- Paul et Virginie (poem by Raymond Radiguet) (1946), FP 132
- Le disparu (poem by Robert Desnos) (1946), FP 134
- Calligrammes (Guillaume Apollinaire): I. L'Espionne; II. Mutation; III. Vers le Sud; IV. Il pleut; V. La Grâce exilée; VI. Aussi bien que les cigales; VII. Voyage (1948), FP 140
- La Fraîcheur et le feu (poems by Paul Éluard), I: "Rayon des yeux", II: "Le matin les branches attisent", III: "Tout disparut", IV: "Dans les ténèbres du jardin", V: "Unis la fraîcheur et le feu", VI: "Homme au sourire tendre", VII: "La grande rivière qui va" (1950), FP 147
- Rosemonde (poem by Apollinaire) (1954), FP 158
- Parisiana (poems by Max Jacob: I: "Jouer du Bugle", II: "Vous n'écrivez plus?") (1954), FP 157
- Le travail du peintre (poems by Paul Éluard), I: "Pablo Picasso", II: "Marc Chagall", III: "Georges Braques", IV: "Juan Gris", V: "Paul Klee", VI: "Joan Miro", VII: "Jacques Villon" (1956), FP 161
- Deux mélodies (I: "La Souris" (Apollinaire), II: "Nuage" (Laurence de Beylié)) (1956), FP 162
- Dernier poème (poem by Robert Desnos) (1956), FP 163
- La Courte Paille (poems by Maurice Carême), I: "Le sommeil", II: "Quelle aventure!", III: "La reine de Coeur", IV: "Ba, be, bi, bo, bu", V: "Les anges musiciens", VI: "Le carafon", VII: "Lune d'Avril" (1960), FP 178

== Bibliography ==
- Bialek, Mireille (2012). "Jacques-Émile Blanche et le Groupe des Six" (PDF). La Gazette (15). Des Amis des Musees De Rouen et du Havre: 7.
- Clements, Andrew (21 March 2008). "Poulenc: Gloria; Motets, Gritton/ Polyphony/ Britten Sinfonia/ Layton". The Guardian.
- Hell, Henri (1978). Francis Poulenc (in French). Paris: Fayard. ISBN 2-213-00670-9.
- Ivry, Benjamin (1996). Francis Poulenc. 20th-Century Composers series. Phaidon Press. ISBN 0-7148-3503-X.
- Prieto, Carlos; Murray, Elena C.; Mutis, Alvaro (2006). The adventures of a cello. University of Texas Press. ISBN 978-0-292-71322-2 – via Internet Archive.
- Roy, Jean: Francis Poulenc Oeuvres complètes (1963–2013) L'Édition du 50e Anniversaire, EMI/Warner France Classics' 20 CD release marking the 50th anniversary of Poulenc's death. The in-depth accompanying material entitled, Francis Poulenc 1899–1963, L'intégrale de ses oeuvres, Edition du 50e anniversaire 1963–2013 was translated to English by Hugh Graham.
- Schmidt, Carl B. (1995). The Music of Francis Poulenc (1899–1963): A Catalogue. Oxford: Clarendon Press. ISBN 978-0-19-816336-7.
- "Francis Poulenc (1899–1963) / Gloria & Motets". Hyperion Records. 2016.
