= List of solo piano compositions by Francis Poulenc =

Poulenc in the early 1920s.

This is a list of solo piano pieces by Francis Poulenc.

== List ==
- Trois pastorales (1917), FP 5
  1. Très vite
  2. Très lent
  3. Vite
- Trois pièces (1918, 1928), FP 48
  1. Pastorale
  2. Hymne
  3. Toccata
- Mouvements perpétuels (1919), FP 14
  1. Assez modéré
  2. Très modéré
  3. Alerte
- Valse (from L'Album des Six) (1919), FP 17
- Suite en ut (1920), FP 19

1. Presto
2. Andante
3. Vif

- Cinq Impromptus (1920–21, revised 1939), FP 21
  1. Très agité
  2. Allegro vivace
  3. Très modéré
  4. Violent
  5. Andante
- Promenades (1921), FP 24
  1. A pied
  2. En auto
  3. A cheval
  4. En bateau
  5. En avion
  6. En autobus
  7. En voiture
  8. En chemin de fer
  9. A bicyclette
  10. En diligence
- Napoli (1925), FP 40
  1. Barcarolle (Assez animé)
  2. Nocturne (Lent)
  3. Caprice Italien (Presto)
- Pastourelle (extrait de L'éventail de Jeanne) (1927), FP 45
- Trois novelettes (1927–28, 1958), FP 47 (first two) and FP 173 (third)
  1. In C major, FP 47
  2. In B♭ minor, FP 47
  3. In E minor, FP 173
- Huit nocturnes (1929–38), FP 56
  1. In C major
  2. In A major ("Bal de jeunes filles")
  3. In F major ("Les Cloches de Malines")
  4. In C minor
  5. In D minor ("Phalenes")
  6. In G major
  7. In E♭ major
  8. In G major
- Pièce brève sur le nom d'Albert Roussel (1929), FP 50
- Soirées de Nazelles, Suite pour piano (1930–36), FP 84
  - Préambule
  - Variations
    - Le comble de la distinction
    - Le cœur sur la main
    - La désinvolture et la discrétion
    - La suite dans les idées
    - Le charme enjôleur
    - Le contentement de soi
    - Le goût du malheur
    - L'alerte vieillesse
  - Cadence
  - Final
- Valse-improvisation sur le nom de Bach (1932), FP 62
- Quinze improvisations pour piano (1932–59): Dix improvisations, FP 63 (1934), FP 113 (Nos. 11–12), FP 170 (Nos. 13–14) and FP 176 (No. 15)
  1. In B minor, FP 63
  2. In A♭ major, FP 63
  3. In B minor, FP 63
  4. In A♭ major, FP 63
  5. In A minor, FP 63
  6. In B♭ major, FP 63
  7. In C major, FP 63
  8. In A minor, FP 63
  9. In D major, FP 63
  10. In F major, FP 63
  11. In G minor, FP 113
  12. In E♭ major, FP 113
  13. In A minor, FP 170
  14. In D♭ major, FP 170
  15. In C minor, FP 176
- Villageoises, pièces enfantines pour piano (1933), FP 65
  1. Valse tyrolienne
  2. Staccato
  3. Rustique
  4. Polka
  5. Petite ronde
  6. Coda
- Trois Feuillets d'album (1933), FP 68
  1. Ariette
  2. Rêve
  3. Gigue
- Presto en si bémol majeur (B♭ major) - (1934), FP 70
- Humoresque (1934), FP 72
- Badinage (1934), FP 73
- Trois intermezzi (1934, 1943), FP 71 (Nos. 1 & 2) and FP 118 (No. 3)
  1. In C major, FP 71
  2. In D♭ major, FP 71
  3. In A♭ major, FP 118
- Suite française, d'après Claude Gervaise (1935), FP 80

1. Bransle de Bourgogne
2. Pavane
3. Petite marche militaire
4. Complainte
5. Bransle de Champagne
6. Sicilienne
7. Carillon

- Bourrée, au pavillon d'Auvergne (1937), FP 87
- Française, d'après Claude Gervaise (1939), FP 103
- Mélancolie (1940), FP 105
- L'embarquement pour Cythère, valse-musette pour Deux Pianos (1951), FP 150
- Thème varié (1951), FP 151
  - Theme
  - Variation I. Jojeuse
  - Variation II. Noble
  - Variation III. Pastorale
  - Variation IV. Sarcastique
  - Variation V. Melancolique
  - Variation VI. Ironique
  - Variation VII. Elegiaque
  - Variation VIII. Volubile
  - Variation IX. Fantasque
  - Variation X. Sibylline
  - Variation XI. Finale

== See also ==
- Francis Poulenc
- List of compositions by Francis Poulenc
- Les Six
