= Sonata for horn, trumpet and trombone =

Composition by Francis Poulenc

- Chamber music by Francis Poulenc
- Poulenc in 1922
- Catalogue: FP 33a
- Composed: 1922, revised 1945
- Dedication: Raymonde Linossier
- Scoring: horn; trumpet; trombone

Premiere
- Date: 4 January 1923
- Location: Théâtre des Champs-Élysées in Paris

The Sonata for horn, trumpet and trombone (Sonate pour cor, trompette et trombone), FP 33a, by Francis Poulenc is a piece of chamber music composed in 1922 and dedicated to Raymonde Linossier (1897–1930). Poulenc revised the composition in 1945.

The sonata is the composer's second extant work of chamber music, after the Sonata for two clarinets. It was written between August and October 1922 at the same time as the Sonata for clarinet and bassoon, and was premiered at the Théâtre des Champs-Élysées in Paris on 4 January 1923 at a Satie-Poulenc concert organized by Jean Wiener.

A typical performance lasts about eight minutes.

== Structure and style ==
Like most of the composer's chamber music pieces, with the exception of the Cello Sonata, the sonata for horn, trumpet and trombone has three short movements:

1. Allegro moderato
2. Andante
3. Rondeau

The character of the music resembles a fair music, conforming to the spirit of Les Six. Kathy Henkel described the first movement as a series of dance episodes, the second as a lullaby derived from motifs of the first movement, and the third as a rondo with more light-hearted dance music. She summarizes the piece's "variety of tone colors, striking rhythms, delicious dissonances, and elegant wit".

== Reception and legacy ==
Since its inception, reception has been favourable, especially that of Charles Koechlin which Poulenc reports in one of his letters, specifying: "... a beaucoup aimé ses 'fourbis', qu'il a trouvé très bien écrits. C'est là l'essentiel." (... loved very much his 'mess' which he found very well written. That is essential.) Poulenc's biographer Henri Hell finds that the two pieces written the same year "acid and tender, well written for wind instruments, have all the quality of the Sonata for two clarinets and the contemporary Trois mouvements perpétuels".

== Selected recording ==
- Ab Koster (horn), Frédéric Mellardi (trumpet), Nicolas Vallade (trombone) : Francis Poulenc – Intégrale Musique de chambre – RCA Red Seal
- André Cazalet (horn), Frédéric Mellardi (trumpet), Guillaume Cottet-Dumoulin (trombone) : Francis Poulenc – Intégrale Musique de chambre avec vents – indésens!

== Bibliography ==
- Hell, Henri (1978). Francis Poulenc. Paris: Fayard. ISBN 978-2-213-00670-3.
- Kathy, Henkel (2017). "Sonata for Horn, Trumpet and Trombone / Francis Poulenc". Los Angeles Philharmonic. Archived from the original on 2017-02-02.
- Machart, Renaud (1995). Poulenc. Paris: Seuil. ISBN 978-2-02-013695-2.
- "Raymonde plissier" (in French). BNF. 2017.
- "Poulenc: Complete Chamber Music / Pahud, Le Sage, Meyer". arkivmusic.com.
- "Sonates – Cor, trombone, trompette. FP 33" (in French). BNF. 2017.
- Francis Poulenc – Intégrale Musique de chambre. RCA Red Seal. 2017. p. 5.
