= Sonata for clarinet and bassoon =

Chamber music by Francis Poulenc

- Chamber music by Francis Poulenc
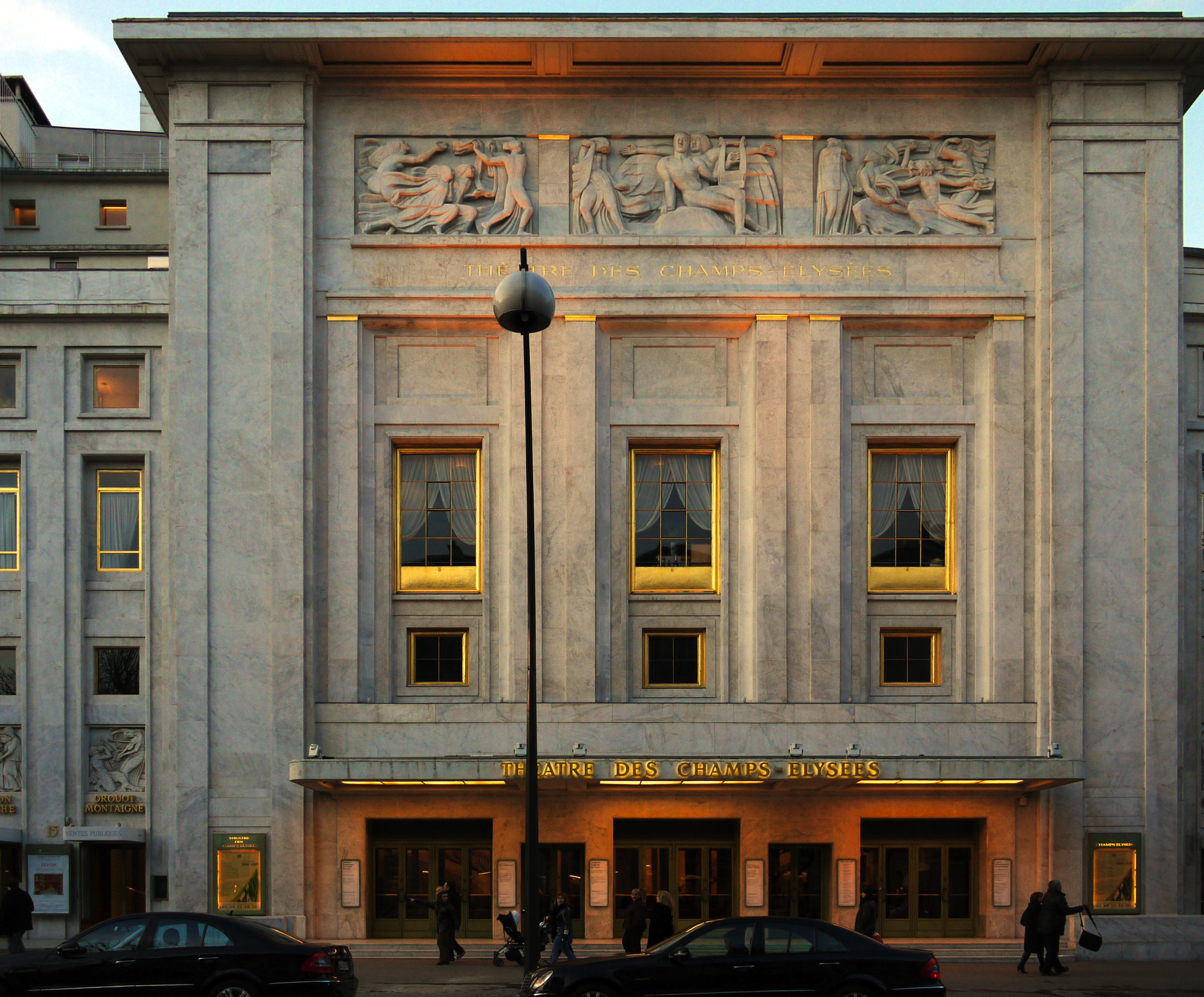
- Théâtre des Champs-Élysées in Paris, where the piece was premiered in 1923
- Catalogue: FP 32a
- Composed: 1922
- Dedication: Madame Audrey Parr
- Performed: 4 January 1923: Paris
- Scoring: clarinet; bassoon

The Sonata for clarinet and bassoon (Sonate pour clarinette et basson), FP 32a, is a piece of chamber music composed by Francis Poulenc. This sonata is the third work of chamber music of the composer after the sonata for two clarinets and the sonata for piano, 4 hands (FP 8).

It was written between August and October 1922 at the same time as the Sonata for horn, trumpet and trombone (FP 33) and premiered by the clarinettist Louis Cahuzac at the Théâtre des Champs-Élysées in Paris on 4 January 1923 at a Satie-Poulenc concert organized by Jean Wiener. Poulenc revised the work in 1945.

The sonata is dedicated "to Madame Audrey Parr". A typical performance lasts about 7 to 8 minutes.

== Structure ==
Like most of the composer's chamber music pieces, with the exception of the Cello Sonata, the sonata for clarinet and bassoon has three short movements:

1. Allegro
2. Romance
3. Final

This sonata is close in clarity and precision to that for two clarinets composed four years earlier.

== Reception and legacy ==
From its creation, critiques were positive, especially those of Charles Koechlin, which Poulenc reports in one of his letters. He specifies that his master very much liked his "stuffs, which he found very well written. That is essential." Biographer Henri Hell found that the two pieces written the same year were "acid and tender, well written for wind instruments, they had all the quality of the sonata for two clarinets, contemporary of the Trois mouvements perpétuels".

== Discography ==
- Karl Laystera and Milan Turković (bassoon)
- Paul Meyer (clarinet) and Gilbert Audin (bassoon): Francis Poulenc - Intégrale Musique de chambre - RCA Red Seal
