= Oboe Sonata (Poulenc) =

1962 oboe sonata by Francis Poulenc

Sonate pour hautbois et piano
- Oboe sonata by Francis Poulenc
- Catalogue: FP 185
- Composed: 1962
- Dedication: Memory of Sergei Prokofiev
- Movements: 3

The Sonate pour hautbois et piano, FP 185, is an oboe sonata by Francis Poulenc dating from 1962. The composer's last work, it is dedicated to the memory of Sergei Prokofiev.

Composed in 1962, the Oboe Sonata is the last of Poulenc's last works, three sonatas for wind instruments and piano, the others being the Flute Sonata (1956) and the Clarinet Sonata (1962). It is dedicated to the memory of Sergei Prokofiev.

== Music ==
The Oboe Sonata is structured in three movements:

1. Elégie (Paisiblement, sans presser)
2. Scherzo (Très animé)
3. Déploration (Très calme)

The movements are in the order slow-fast-slow, opposed to the traditional fast-slow-fast sequence. A performance will last between 13 and 15 minutes.

The first movement, Élégie (elegy), is marked Paisiblement, sans presser (Peacefully, without hurry). It begins with a high four-note phrase. A steady bass line and pulsing harmony from the piano support a plaint melody, a lyrical second theme, and a third theme that features a double-dotted motif, providing the climax of the movement. It ends quietly, with a recapitulation of the previous peaceful material.

The central Scherzo is marked Très animé (very lively). The three-partite movement has toccata-like features in its outer parts, with pointed rhythms and arpeggios. A slower middle section leads to a climax in the piano.

The final Déploration, marked Très calme (very calm), has a theme like a chorale, introduced in the piano. The entrance of the oboe is marked monotone, and the essentially sad music shifts in tonality towards the close.

A reviewer from The New York Times described the sonata as a "paradoxical mix of the elegiac, the suave and the clever".

Poulenc's wind sonatas share thematic material. For example, motifs in the final movement of the Clarinet Sonata can be heard in the Scherzo of the Oboe Sonata. Similarly, the Second Movement of the Clarinet Sonata opens with a motif that can be seen as an inversion of the opening of the Elégie of the Oboe Sonata.
