= Deux poèmes de Louis Aragon =

Composition by Francis Poulenc

- by Francis Poulenc
- Catalogue: FP 122
- Year: 1943
- Text: Louis Aragon's Les yeux d'Elsa
- Language: French
- Dedication: Marcel Royer; Jean de Polignac
- Published: 1943 - Paris
- Publisher: Rouart, Lerolle & Cie. Éditions Salabert
- Duration: 5 minutes approx.
- Movements: 2
- Scoring: Voice and piano

Deux poèmes de Louis Aragon, FP 122 (in English, Two poems of Louis Aragon), is a song cycle for voice and piano by French composer Francis Poulenc. Published just after Métamorphoses, it was finished in 1943.

== Background ==
The songs in Deux poèmes were composed in September (No. 1) and October 1943 (No. 2), in Noizay, near the Loire, which is geographically close to the landscape evoked in the poems. They were written after Poulenc received the first edition of Louis Aragon's Les yeux d'Elsa (1942), published in Switzerland clandestinely. Fêtes galantes was founde on page 49 in the book, whereas C was on page 55. C refers to Les Ponts-de-Cé, a commune associated with French military history within the context of the German occupation of France. Fêtes galantes, on the other hand, refers to the mass departure of civilians from Paris in June 1940, when many citizens fled the city that was expected to be bombarded by Germans. Its Even though Poulenc personally met Aragon, a contemporary poet and colleague of Paul Éluard, the composer didn't set any other poems in his oeuvre. Aragon, a marxist writer, presented strong political arguments in Les yeux d'Elsa; however, Poulenc chose to actively depart from propagandistic or political tones in his setting.

Each of the Deux poèmes was dedicated to a different person. C was dedicated "à Papoum" (Marcel Royer), whereas Fêtes galantes was dedicated to Jean de Polignac, Marie-Blanche de Polignac's husband, who was an important patron. It was published by Rouart, Lerolle & Cie. in Paris in 1944, and was later reprinted by Éditions Salabert.

== Structure ==
The cycle consists of two songs for voice and orchestra. It takes around 5 minutes to perform. The movement list is as follows:

1. C. Très calme
2. Fêtes galantes. Incroyablement vite, dans le style des chansons-scies de café-concert

The lyrical first movement, C, is in an unchanging 3/4. It is in A minor and is 41 bars long. The second movement, on the other hand, is a quick-paced piece in. It is in the key of F major and has a total of 34 bars.

== Recordings ==
The following is a list of recordings of Deux poèmes de Louis Aragon:

Recordings of Poulenc's Deux poèmes de Louis Aragon
| Voice | Piano | Date of recording | Place of recording | Label |
|---|---|---|---|---|
| Pierre Bernac | Francis Poulenc | December 1945 | Abbey Road Studio No. 3, London, UK | HMV / EMI Classics |
| Lorna Anderson | Malcolm Martineau | September 2010 | St Michael's Church, Summertown, Oxford, UK | Signum Classics |
| Ben Johnson | Graham Johnson | May 2011 | All Saints' Church, East Finchley, London, UK | Hyperion |

== Reception ==
The reception of the song cycle was immediate. At its first performance in Amsterdam, the audience reportedly responded with a silent standing ovation, which was unusual as German officers were present in the hall.
