= Piano Concerto in C-sharp minor =

Piano Concerto in C-sharp minor may refer to:

- Piano Concerto No. 3 (Ries)
- Piano Concerto (Rimsky-Korsakov)
- Piano Concerto (Beach)
- Piano Concerto (Poulenc)
