= Brigitte Manceaux =

French pianist and niece of Francis Poulenc (1914–1963)

Brigitte Manceaux (14 December 1914 – 21 April 1963) was a French pianist and the eldest niece of composer Francis Poulenc. After the death of his childhood friend Raymonde Linossier in 1930, Manceaux assumed her place as her uncle's closest friend and lifelong confidante; eventually she also became his unofficial secretary and advisor.

== Biography ==
Brigitte Manceaux was born in Paris in 1914 to André and Jeanne Manceaux, who had been wed on 2 June of the previous year. Her mother was the elder sister of the composer Francis Poulenc and was herself a pianist and voice student of Jeanne Raunay and Claire Croiza. Between 1917 and 1919, the still teenaged Poulenc lived with the Manceaux family after his parents had died. Manceaux developed an interest in music as a child, which was encouraged by her uncle and mother. She later enrolled in the Paris Conservatory to study piano, becoming a pupil of Marguerite Long. In 1933 she met fellow student Jacqueline Bernard, who became a lifelong friend and later married Poulenc's then lover, Raymond Latarjet. After graduating, Manceaux taught piano privately, as well as gave recitals, often under the auspices of her uncle.

On 30 January 1930, Poulenc's childhood friend Raymonde Linossier died after a sudden illness. Later that year, Poulenc began to seek Manceaux's help and counsel. Poulenc wrote to Long that Manceaux was aiding him in the composition of his Concerto for Two Pianos, explaining that she assisted him in rehearsing "certain passages a thousand times." A few years later, Poulenc dedicated to her the third of his Quinze improvisations; a decade later she would also be the dedicatee of his Violin Sonata. In July 1945, Poulenc wrote to Manceaux that he was delighted that she would be recording the sonata with the violinist Françoise Soulé, but no further trace of this recording appears to have survived. Soulé, another close friend of Manceaux's, would later marry Pierre Momméja. By the 1940s, Manceaux had become Poulenc's assistant, called upon to attend to various tasks on his behalf, often on short notice. Manceaux also became Poulenc's most trusted confidante and closest friend.

In spring 1954, Poulenc was reeling from news that his lover, Lucien Roubert, had been diagnosed with terminal cancer. Poulenc was also suffering from problems with his gall bladder during this time. Fearing that he possibly had cancer as well, Poulenc drafted a will on 2 June 1954 designating Manceaux as "sole guardian" of his estate. He also disclosed that his godchild, Marie-Ange Lebedeff, born on 13 September 1946, was in actuality his daughter that he had fathered out of wedlock with a friend, Fréderique Lebedeff. Neither his daughter nor Manceaux would learn the contents of the will until after Poulenc’s death. The document also indicated to Manceaux to whom he wished to bequeath various items from his estate, the majority of which he left to her. He also pleaded with her to care for his daughter in the event of his death. In the will, Poulenc said that Manceaux was "like a second Raymonde" to him.

Manceaux's assistance proved especially invaluable while Poulenc composed and attended to the rehearsals for Dialogues des Carmélites in 1957. She not only completed tasks related to the opera itself, but also managed his home in Noizay while he was away. With the help of her father, Manceaux acquired a property for herself in Saint-Tropez she dubbed "La Brigida" in August 1957. In one of the few extant letters from Manceaux to Poulenc, she wrote on 16 August of her new home in this "pretty Basque country [sic]" that it suited her needs: "As I get older I need more heat, to live outdoors, and to enjoy living without sweaters." Manceaux lived with her partner Inès Bonafoux, a nurse she had met during the war. Manceaux was described by her friend Jacqueline Latarjet as a fine musician, a charming woman, but a victim of an excess of modesty who lacked confidence in herself despite her qualities. Bonafoux recalled her generosity and her gregariousness.

Poulenc died on 30 January 1963 in his Paris apartment following weeks of illness; he had suffered a mild heart attack the previous August. Jacqueline Latarjet had been informed of Poulenc's death by Françoise Momméja, who pleaded with her to break the news to Manceaux. Latarjet called Manceaux, but balked at the last moment. Instead, she suggested they visit the composer as he was not feeling well. Manceaux learned of her uncle's death when she arrived at his apartment, whereupon she screamed "He's dead!" and collapsed.

The following March, Manceaux travelled to Milan to supervise La Scala's new production of Les Mamelles de Tirésias conducted by Nino Sanzogno. Manceaux wrote to her mother that the whole time she had the impression that Poulenc would reappear. "I do not understand what is happening to me," she continued," being there without Francis, in his place." The next month, she travelled with Pierre Bernac and Suzanne Peignot to New York City to attend the premieres of the Clarinet Sonata and Sept répons des ténèbres on 10 and 11 April respectively. She returned exhausted to "La Brigida," where she became afflicted with a bowel obstruction. Poor treatment resulted in her death on 21 April. According to Marcel Schneider, who was by Manceaux's side at her death, her last words were: "My only consolation is knowing that I am going to meet Francis again, but at the same time it is hard to die when one is still young!"

== Cited sources ==
- Johnson, Graham (2020). Poulenc: The Life in the Songs. New York City: Liveright. ISBN 978-1-63149-523-6.
- Miscevic, Pierre, ed. (2019). Francis Poulenc: Lettres inédites à Brigitte Manceaux (in French). Paris: Editions Orizons. ISBN 979-10-309-0217-4.
- Nichols, Roger (2020). Poulenc: A Biography. New Haven, CT: Yale University Press. ISBN 978-0-300-22650-8.
