= Quatre Petites Prières de saint François d'Assise =

Composition by Francis Poulenc

- Motets by Francis Poulenc
- English: Four small prayers of Saint Francis of Assisi
- Catalogue: FP 142
- Language: French
- Composed: 1948
- Dedication: Franciscans of Champfleury
- Scoring: male voices a cappella

Quatre Petites Prières de saint François d'Assise, FP 142 (Four small prayers of Saint Francis of Assisi) is a sacred choral work by Francis Poulenc for a cappella men's chorus, composed in 1948. Written on a request by Poulenc's relative who was a Franciscan friar, the work was premiered by the monks of Champfleury.

== Genesis ==
In the summer of 1948, Poulenc's great-nephew Jérôme, who lived as a friar in the Franciscan monastery of Champfleury near Poissy, sent Poulenc French translations of four prayers attributed to Francis of Assisi with the request to his great uncle to set them in music.

Poulenc set the prayers to music within a few weeks in his house in Noizay and dedicated the work to the Franciscans of Champfleury. Poulenc commented on his composition: "I worship St. Francis, but he intimidates me a little too. In any case, I wanted to set a sign of humility with the setting of his wonderfully touching prayers. Thus, in the fourth piece, for example, a simple solo is heard at the beginning, like a monk leading his brothers in prayer." The premiere was performed by the monastery choir in Champfleury as part of the liturgy. Poulenc wrote to the conductor that he appreciated the atmosphere of clarity and trust, more touching than the work with professionals who look at their watches during a concert.

== Music ==
Poulenc merges archaic elements of medieval monastic chanting, e. g. organum-imitations or reminiscences of the Gregorian chant with the progressive harmonies typical of him. Nonetheless, the simple-looking melodies embedded in homophony represent a dedication to the work of Francis of Assisi. A performance lasts about eight minutes. A 2004 thesis describes the works as "stylistically distilled" and notes about the Petite Prières, along with the Mass in G and Quatre Motets pour un temps de pénitence, that they "display the greatest variety of style and form" and that they show "Poulenc's skillful unification of sacred and secular, ancient and modern sound worlds".

== Text ==
I. Salut, Dame Sainte

Salut, Dame Sainte, reine très sainte, Mère de Dieu,
ô Marie qui êtes vierge perpétuellement,
élue par le très saint Père du Ciel,
consacrée par Lui avec son très saint Fils bien aimé
et l’Esprit Paraclet.
Vous en qui fut et demeure toute plénitude de grâce et tout bien!
Salut, palais; salut, tabernacle; salut, maison;
salut, vêtement; salut servante; salut, mère de Dieu!
Et salut à vous toutes, saintes vertus
qui par la grâce et l’illumination du Saint Esprit,
êtes versées dans les cœurs des fidèles
et, d’infidèles que nous sommes, nous rendez fidèles à Dieu.

II. Tout puissant

Tout puissant, très saint, très haut et souverain Dieu;
souverain bien, bien universel, bien total;
toi qui seul es bon;
puissions-nous te rendre toute louange,
toute gloire, toute reconnaissance,
tout honneur, toute bénédiction;
puissions-nous rapporter toujours à toi tous les biens.
Amen.

III. Seigneur, je vous en prie

Seigneur, je vous en prie,
que la force brûlante et douce de votre amour
absorbe mon âme
et la retire de tout ce qui est sous le ciel.
Afin que je meure par amour de votre amour,
puisque vous avez daigné mourir par amour de mon amour.

IV. Ô mes très chers frères

Ô mes très chers frères
et mes enfants bénis pour toute l’éternité,
écoutez-moi, écoutez la voix de votre Père:
Nous avons promis de grandes choses,
on nous en a promis de plus grandes;
gardons les unes et soupirons après les autres;
le plaisir est court, la peine éternelle.
La souffrance est légère, la gloire infinie.
Beaucoup sont appelés, peu sont élus;
tous recevront ce qu’ils auront mérité.
Ainsi soit-il.
