= Georges Favre =

French composer and musicologist (1905–1993)

- Born: 26 July 1905; Saintes, Charente-Maritime
- Died: 25 April 1993 (aged 87); Paris
- Occupation(s): Composer, musicologist

Georges Favre (26 July 1905 – 25 April 1993) was a French composer and musicologist. He was a student of Paul Dukas for composition and Vincent d'Indy for conducting.

He composed a few pieces for piano, the opera Guna, and a sonata for violin and piano. He is better known as musicologist. He supported his PhD thesis on Boieldieu and published many works on Dukas. He was Inspector General of Music at the Ministry of Education.

== Musical works ==
- Cantate du jardin vert (on texts by Madeleine Ley). Recording under the direction of Louis Frémaux - Le Petit Ménestrel, microgroove 33 1/3 rpm, s.d., circa 1958.

== Literary works ==
- 1987: Paul Lacombe, 1838-1927 : un compositeur languedocien oublie (in French). Béziers France: Société de musicologie de Languedoc. 1987. ISBN 2-905-40007-2.
- 1986: Silhouettes du Conservatoire : Charles-Marie Widor, André Gedalge, Max d'Ollone, La Pensée universelle, ISBN 2214066438
- 1983: Compositeurs français méconnus : Ernest Guiraud et ses Amis, Émile Paladilhe et Théodore Dubois, La Pensée universelle, ISBN 2214055037
- 1982: Musique et Naturalisme : Alfred Bruneau and Émile Zola, La Pensée universelle, ISBN 2214049479
- 1979: La Vicomtesse Vigier : Sophie Cruvelli 1826-1907 Une Grande Cantatrice Niçoise, La Pensée universelle, ISBN 2708400371
- 1976: Études musicales monégasques : notes d'histoire (XVIIIe-XXe siècles), A. et J. Picard, ISBN 2708400134
- 1966: Écrits sur la musique et l'éducation musicale, Paris, Éditions Durand & Cie; ASIN B0000DPGIH
- 1985: Richard Wagner par le disque, Paris, Éditions Durand & Cie, ASIN B0000DWC2X
- 1948: Paul Dukas, La Colombe, Collection Euterpe ASIN B0000DSWYA
- 1944–45 Boieldieu, sa vie, son œuvre, Prix Dodo of the Académie française
- 1953: La musique française de piano avant 1830, Paris
