= Fiançailles pour rire =

Song cycle by Francis Poulenc

- Song cycle by Francis Poulenc
- Catalogue: FP 101
- Composed: 1939
- Scoring: voice; piano

Fiançailles pour rire ("Betrothal for Laughs"), FP 101, is a song cycle of six mélodies for voice and piano by Francis Poulenc on poems from the collection of the same name by Louise de Vilmorin. Composed in 1939, it was premiered on 21 March 1942 at Salle Gaveau by the soprano Geneviève Touraine and the composer as the pianist.

== Titles ==
- "La Dame d'André"
- "Dans l'herbe"
- "Il vole"
- "Mon cadavre est doux comme un gant"
- "Violon"
- "Fleurs"

== Dedicatees ==
The song "Fleurs" was dedicated to Solange d'Ayen, the Duchess of Ayen and fashion editor of French Vogue magazine.
