= Geneviève Touraine =

French opera singer

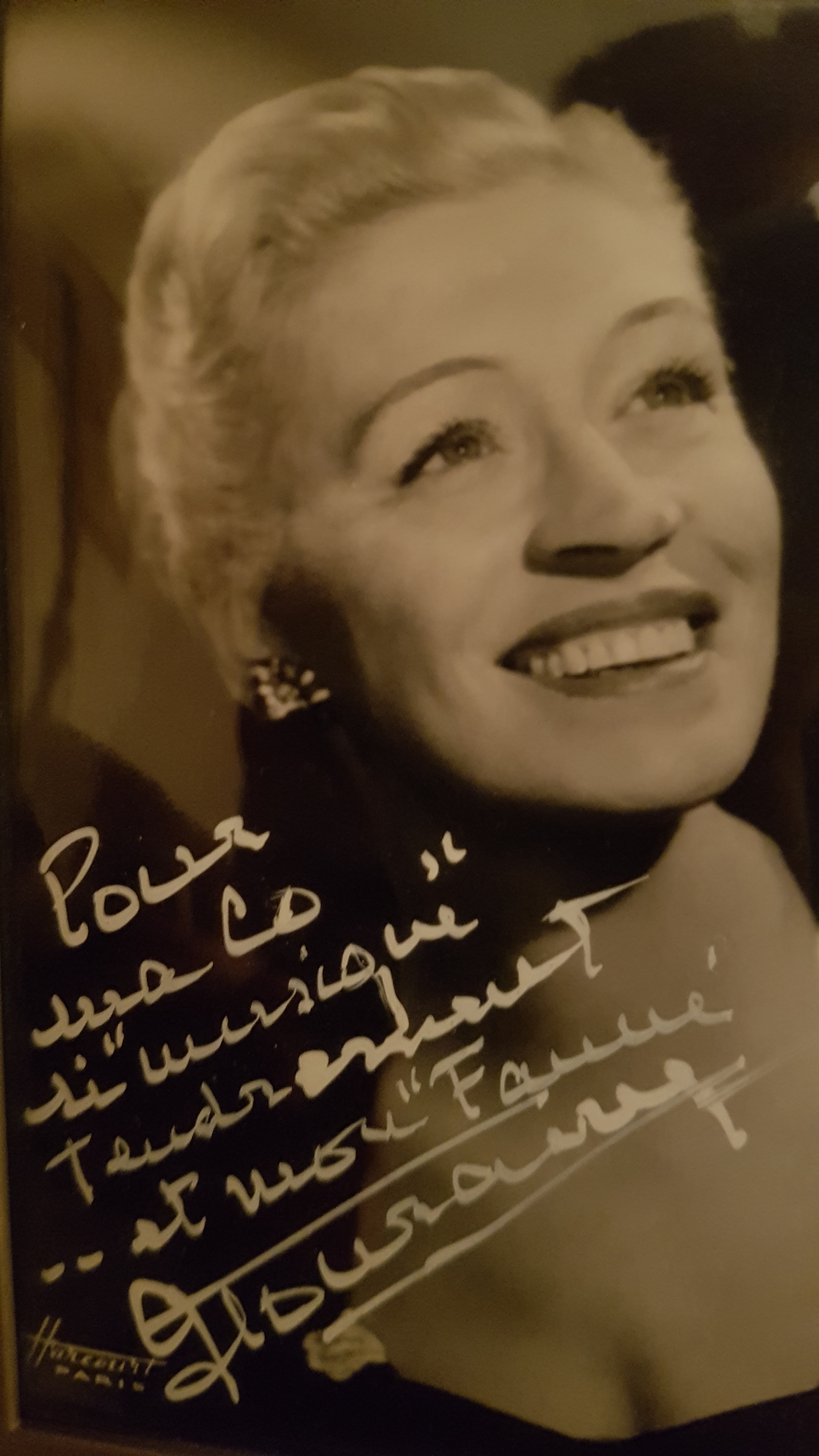

Geneviève Touraine, real name Geneviève Tisserand, (20 November 1903 – 10 July 1982) was a French classical singer (soprano).

She was baritone Gérard Souzay's older sister.

== Biography ==
She was born in Fontenay-sous-Bois in a family of musicians settled in Chinon in Touraine (hence the choice of her pseudonym). Her father, Georges Tisserand, a career officer, played the cello, and her mother, Madeleine Hennique, had a beautiful soprano voice. Her three brothers also showed good dispositions for singing, especially the youngest who would make an international career under the name of Gérard Souzay.

In 1942, Geneviève Touraine premiered the mélodies cycle Fiançailles pour rire by Francis Poulenc, composed in 1939 on poems by Louise de Vilmorin. She also realized several records of melodies of which two with her brother but went relatively eclipsed by the reputation of the latter. She taught her art for several years at the École Normale de Musique de Paris.

== Selected discography ==
- Mélodies françaises, with Gérard Souzay (baritone), Jacqueline Robin and Francis Poulenc (piano) – Lumen, 1954–1957

Mélodies et duos by Jacques Leguerney, Albert Roussel, Joseph Canteloube, Henry Purcell, Claude Debussy, Gabriel Fauré, Charles Gounod, Emmanuel Chabrier and Francis Poulenc.
