= Dix improvisations =

Set of improvisations by Francis Poulenc

- by Francis Poulenc
- English: Ten improvisations
- Catalogue: FP 63
- Year: 1932-1934
- Dedication: Various dedicatees
- Published: 1933 & 1934 - Paris
- Publisher: Rouart, Lerolle & Cie; Éditions Salabert
- Duration: 15 minutes approx.
- Movements: 10
- Scoring: Solo piano

Dix improvisations (from French, Ten Improvisations), FP 63, is the first set of improvisations by French composer Francis Poulenc. Written for solo piano, it was finished in 1934.

== Background ==
Poulenc did not set out to compose the ten improvisations as a set from the start. He lamented in a letter to Marie-Blanche de Polignac that, due to a lack of commissions, he would be compelled to compose piano pieces to satisfy his publishers: "I understand that one must create for the love of art, yet there are times when one must think as much about coal as about a pork chop." The first six improvisations were composed between November and December 1932 at Noizay, merely one month after writing the letter, and were initially published together as a set of six improvisation by Rouart, Lerolle & Cie in 1933. The seventh improvisation was written in November 1933, whereas the remaining three improvisations were completed in 1934. Rouart & Lerolle published these remaining four improvisations in 1934 as stand-alone, separate items. The whole set of ten improvisations was eventually republished by Salabert in 1990. The set was also republished in Les quinze improvisations, a compilation published in 1960 that also included Deux improvisations, FP 113 (1941), Deux improvisations, FP 170 (1958), and Improvisation No. 15 en ut mineur, FP 176 (1959). The compilation was issued to coincide with the publication of the final improvisation in 1960.

Since many of these little pieces were not initially expected to be published one way or another, each of the Dix improvisations is assigned a distinct dedicatee. Improvisation No. 1 is dedicated to Madame Long de Marliave, followed by dedications to Louis Duffey (No. 2), Brigitte Manceaux (No. 3), Claude Popelin (No. 4), Georges Auric (No. 5), Jacques Février (No. 6), the Comtesse A. J. de Noailles (No. 7), Nora Auric (No. 8), Thérèse Dorny (No. 9), and Jacques Lerolle (No. 10). The improvisations never received a formal premiere, though "seven" of them were performed at the sixth La Sérénade concert in on February 4, 1933, several months before the seventh improvisation was formally completed. He continued to tour around Europe and North Africa from 1933 to 1935 and performed these pieces relatively frequently.

Poulenc was particularly fond of these works, and he recorded four of them, Nos. 2, 5, 9, and 10, for Columbia Records on November 20, 1934, in Paris.

== Structure ==
This set of improvisations takes around 15 minutes to perform. It is scored for solo piano. The movement list is as follows:

1. Improvisation in B minor. Presto ritmico
2. Improvisation in A-flat major. Assez animé
3. Improvisation in B minor. Presto très sec
4. Improvisation in A-flar major. Presto con fuoco
5. Improvisation in A minor. Modéré mais sans lenteur
6. Improvisation in B-flat major. A toute vitesse
7. Improvisation in C major. Modéré sans lenteur
8. Improvisation in A minor. Presto (très sec et ironique)
9. Improvisation in D major. Presto possibile (très sec et très net)
10. Improvisation in F major. Éloge des gammes. Modéré, sans traîner
