= Trois Novelettes =

Composition by Francis Poulenc

- Piano music by Francis Poulenc
- Poulenc in 1922
- Key: C major; B♭ minor; E minor
- Catalogue: FP 47 (1,2); FP 173 (3)
- Composed: 1927 (1); 1928 (2); 1959 (3)

Trois Novelettes (Three Novelettes) are three short pieces for piano composed by Francis Poulenc.

The first two novelettes, in C major and B♭ minor, FP 47, written in 1927 and 1928 respectively, were originally published together. The third, in E minor, FP 173, was written in 1959. These novelettes demonstrate multi-layered piano writing.

- Novelette in C major (1927) is dedicated to Virginie Liénard, a family friend, also the dedicatee of Poulenc's piano suite Soirées de Nazelles (1930–36). The piece features a neo-classical song-like melody interrupted by a central contrasting section.
- Novelette in B-flat minor (1928) is similar in ways to a scherzo. It is dedicated to Poulenc's friend and critic Louis Laloy.
- Novelette in E minor (1959) is based on Manuel de Falla's 7/8 theme from El amor brujo (1916), simplified by Poulenc into 3/8 time, and without a contrasting section. It employs fluid arpeggio figures. This piece is dedicated to Poulenc's close friend R. Douglas Gibson.
- Manuel de Falla: Reference is found in Pantomima, Andantino Tranquilo.

Poulenc premiered his first two novelettes at a concert in Paris on 10 June 1928.
