= Banalités (Poulenc) =

Composition by Francis Poulenc

Banalités (FP 107) is a set of five mélodies for voice and piano composed by Francis Poulenc in 1940 on poems by Guillaume Apollinaire (1880–1918).

== History of the work ==
Composed in 1940, the mélodies were premiered at salle Gaveau, on 14 December 1940, by Pierre Bernac (baritone) and the composer (piano).

== Titles ==
1. Chanson d’Orkenise
2. Hôtel
3. Fagnes de Wallonie
4. Voyage à Paris
5. Sanglots

== Source of the poems ==
"Chanson d'Orkenise", "Fagnes de Wallonie" and "Sanglots" are taken from the collection Il y a (1925).

"Hôtel", written in 1913, was published in the posthumous collection Le Guetteur mélancolique (1952). "Voyage à Paris" was published in the Poèmes retrouvés from the Œuvres poétiques by Apollinaire in 1956.

== Dedicatees ==
"Chanson d'Orkenise" is dedicated to Claude Rostand, "Hôtel" to Marthe Bosredon, "Fagnes de Wallonie" to Ms. Henri Frédéricq, "Voyage à Paris" to Paul Éluard, and "Sanglots" to Suzette Chanlaire.

== Discography ==
- Pierre Bernac (baritone) and Francis Poulenc (piano) in 1950 (Naxos).
- 1 and 2: Régine Crespin (soprano) and John Wustman (piano) in 1967 (Decca).
- Nathalie Stutzmann (contralto) and Inger Södergren (piano) (RCA).
- Michel Piquemal (baritone) and Christine Lajarrige (piano) (Naxos).
- Véronique Gens (soprano) and Roger Vignoles (piano) (Erato).

== Quote ==
- One song by the band Pink Martini, "Sympathique", is inspired by the poem "Hotel" by Apollinaire and its setting to music by Poulenc.
