= Litanies à la Vierge Noire =

French sacred choir music

- Notre-Dame de Rocamadour
- Sacred music by Francis Poulenc
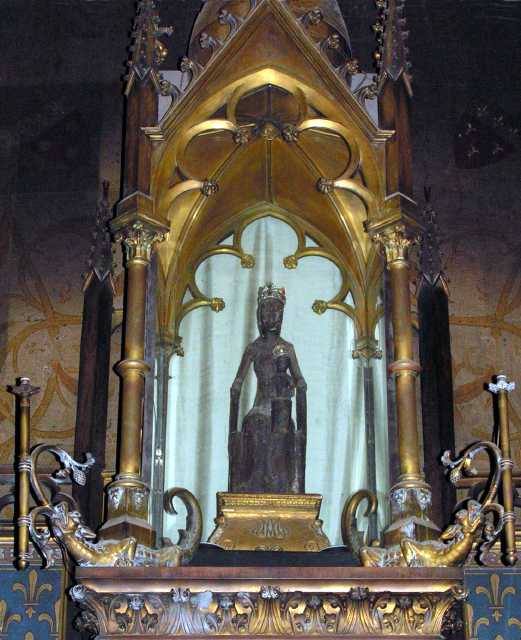
- The Black Virgin, venerated by pilgrims in Rocamadour
- English: Litany to the Black Virgin
- Catalogue: FP 82
- Text: Litany
- Language: French
- Composed: 1936
- Scoring: 1936: Women's (or children's) choir, organ; 1947: Choir, string orchestra, timpani

Litanies à la Vierge Noire (French pronunciation: [litani a la vjɛʁʒ nwaʁ]; "Litany to the Black Virgin"), FP 82, is a piece of sacred music composed by Francis Poulenc in 1936 for a three-part choir of women (or children) and organ, setting a French litany recited at the pilgrimage site Rocamadour which the composer visited. The subtitle, Notre-Dame de Rocamadour, refers to the venerated black sculpture of Mary. The composition is Poulenc's first piece of sacred music. In 1947 he wrote a version for voices accompanied by string orchestra and timpani.

== History ==
Poulenc returned to the Catholic faith of his youth in 1936 and began to compose sacred music with this piece. He made a pilgrimage to the shrine of the Black Virgin of Rocamadour shortly after learning of the death of his friend, the composer Pierre-Octave Ferroud, in a car accident. His account of the pilgrimage reads:

A few days earlier I'd just heard of the tragic death of my colleague ... As I meditated on the fragility of our human frame, I was drawn once more to the life of the spirit. Rocamadour had the effect of restoring me to the faith of my childhood. This sanctuary, undoubtedly the oldest in France ... had everything to captivate me ... The same evening of this visit to Rocamadour, I began my Litanies à la Vierge noire for female voices and organ. In that work I tried to get across the atmosphere of "peasant devotion" that had struck me so forcibly in that lofty chapel.

The piece was published by Durand & Cie in Paris in 1937.

== Text and music ==
Poulenc heard the French text of the litany, beginning with the line "Seigneur, ayez pitié de nous" (Lord, have mercy on us), during his pilgrimage. It is a prayer for mercy, addressing the persons of the Trinity, and for intercession from Mary of Rocamadour, who is named Virgin, Queen and Our Lady, for example "Vierge à qui Zachée ou Saint Amadour éleva ce sanctuaire, priez pour nous." (Virgin, to whom Zacchaeus or Saint Amadour constructed this shrine, pray for us.), "Reine, dont la main délivrait les captifs, priez pour nous." (Queen, whose hand delivered the captives, pray for us.) and "Notre Dame, dont le pèlerinage est enrichi de faveurs spéciales ... priez pour nous." (Our Lady, whose pilgrimage is blessed with special favours ... pray for us.).

Poulenc scored the litany for a three-part choir of women's voices or children's voices with organ accompaniment. The work is modal in the style of chant, avoiding conventional cadences. The organ adds several "dramatic dissonances".

In 1947 Poulenc expanded the instrumentation to string orchestra and timpani.

== Bibliography ==
- Cookson, Michael (2014). "Francis Poulenc (1899–1963) / Stabat Mater (1950) / Sept Répons des Ténèbres (1961/62)". musicweb-international.com.
- McVicker, William (1994). "Litanies à la Vierge Noire 'Notre Dame de Rocamadour'". Hyperion.
- Poulenc, Francis (2014). Southon, Nicolas (ed.). Articles and Interviews – Notes from the Heart. Translated by Nichols, Roger Nichols. Burlington, US: Ashgate. ISBN 978-1-4094-6622-2.
- Schmidt, Carl B. (1995). The Music of Francis Poulenc (1899–1963): A Catalogue. Oxford: Clarendon Press. ISBN 978-0-19-816336-7.
- Wise, Brian (2017). "Francis Poulenc / Litanies à la Vierge Noire, for women's chorus & organ (or strings & timpani), FP 82". AllMusic.
- Litanies à la Vierge noire . Choeur de femmes ou d'enfants, orgue. FP 82 /liturgie (in French). BNF. 2017.
