= Sonata for two clarinets =

- Chamber music by Francis Poulenc
- Poulenc in 1922
- Catalogue: FP 7
- Composed: 1918–45
- Dedication: Édouard Souberbielle
- Movements: 3

The Sonata for two clarinets (Sonate pour deux clarinettes), FP 7, is a piece of chamber music composed by Francis Poulenc in 1918. It is unusual among clarinet duets in that it is written for B♭ clarinet, which generally plays the melodic themes, and A clarinet, which plays a more supporting role through much of the piece. It is also unusual for music of this period that the clarinetists perform different time signatures simultaneously in parts of the opening movement.

Dedicated to Édouard Souberbielle, its total execution time is about six minutes.

== Background ==
On 17 January 1918, Poulenc was mobilized despite the imminent end of the first world war. Based in Vincennes, he did not lose contact with the Paris of the arts and serenely led the beginnings of his career as a composer.

After he met some success with the Rapsodie nègre and worldwide fame after the premiere of the Trois mouvements perpétuels played by pianist Ricardo Viñes, Poulenc began writing two pieces in the spring of 1918. Published the same year, the sonata for piano, four hands, and the sonata for two clarinets were created during the same concerts at the Salle Huyghens in Paris on 5 April 1919.

The success of the Trois mouvements perpétuels was confirmed by the sonata for two clarinets. The biographer Henri Hell recognized "an acid taste that delightfully annoys the ear".

== Music ==
Like most of the composer's chamber music pieces, with the exception of the Cello Sonata, the sonata for two clarinets has three short movements:

1. Presto
2. Andante
3. Vif

Praised for the solidity of its writing, the sonata already testified to a mastery of the technique of wind instruments dear to the composer. This inclination for the winds coincided with that of Igor Stravinsky who clearly rejected the use of strings for their too strong resemblance to the human voice.

== Recordings ==
- Michel Portal and Paul Meyer: Francis Poulenc – Intégrale Musique de chambre – RCA Red Seal

== Published score ==
- Sonata for two clarinets, Chester Music, London, cat. CH00219
