= Piano Suite (Poulenc) =

Suite en 3 mouvements Piano Suite
- Piano music by Francis Poulenc
- Poulenc in 1922
- Key: C major
- Catalogue: FP 19
- Composed: 1920

The Suite en 3 mouvements in C major, FP 19, is a suite for piano by Francis Poulenc. It has three movements:

1. Presto
2. Andante
3. Vif

The suite was completed in March 1920 and was first performed on April 10 of the same year by pianist Ricardo Viñes in the Paris Conservatory. Along with the waltz, he contributed to L'Album des Six, a project completed by members of Les Six, this suite marked a return to the anti-impressionist style for which Poulenc was known; a style which is more clear and airy and in the spirit of French Harpsichordists as well as the more traditional style of Scarlatti.

== Bibliography ==
- Schmidt, Carl B. (1995). The Music of Francis Poulenc (1899–1963): A Catalogue. Oxford: Clarendon Press. ISBN 978-0-19-816336-7.
