= Chanson à boire (Poulenc) =

Choral work by Francis Poulenc

- Choral composition by Francis Poulenc
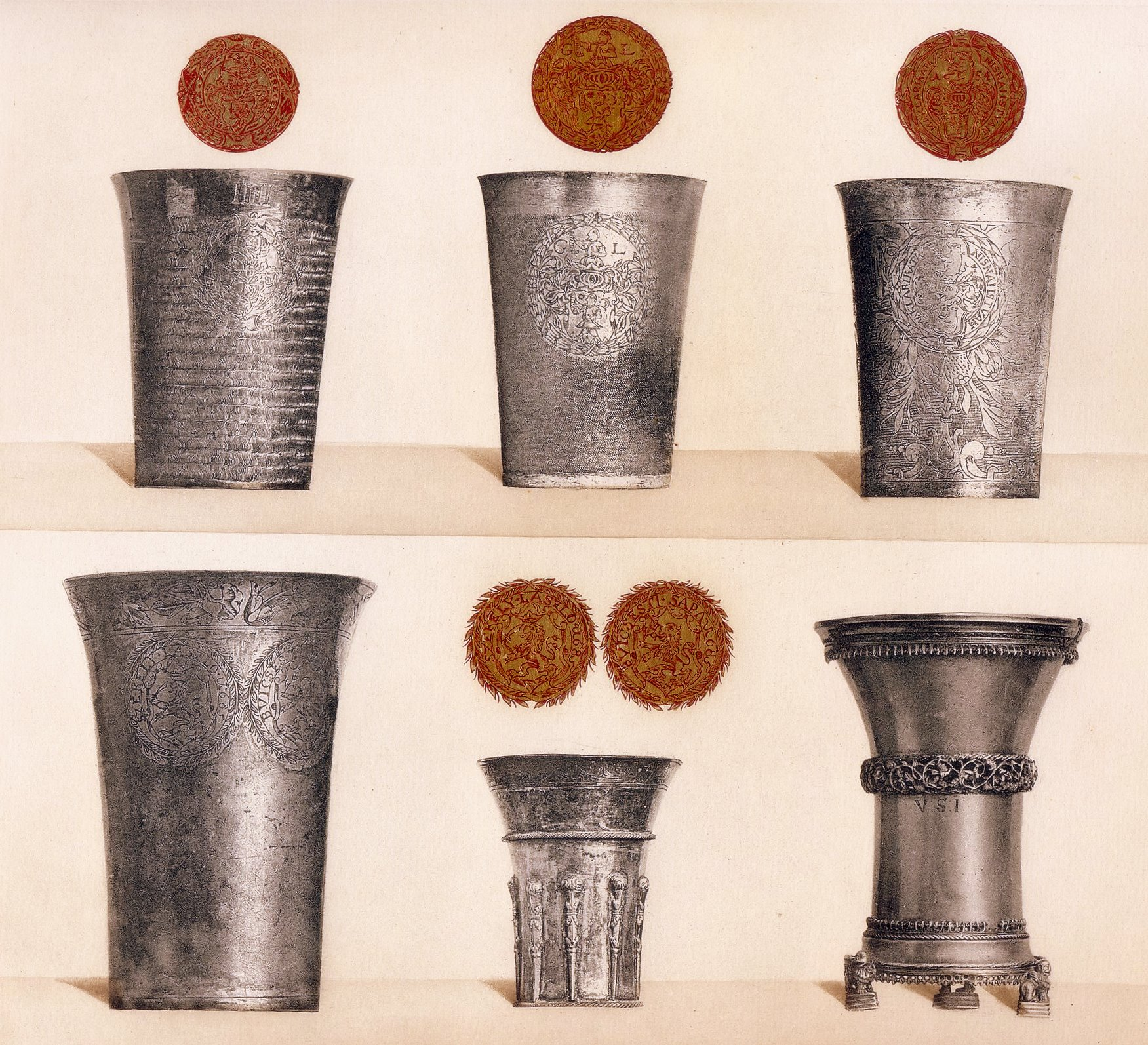
- Silver drinking cups from the 15th and 17th centuries
- English: Drinking song
- Catalogue: FP 31
- Text: Anonymous text of the 17th century
- Language: French
- Composed: 1922
- Dedication: Harvard Glee Club
- Performed: 1950: The Hague
- Scoring: Four-part men's chorus

Chanson à boire, (Note: This work should not be confused with Chanson à boire, the second of the eight Chansons gaillardes, FP 42, a work by the same composer on a different text.) (Drinking song), FP 31, is a choral work by Francis Poulenc, composed in 1922 on an anonymous text of the 17th century for a four-part men's chorus a cappella. It was published first by Rouart-Lerolle, but today by Salabert.

== History ==
Chanson à boire is Poulenc's first choral work, commissioned by a student choir, the Glee Club of Harvard University in the United States. Upon completion, Poulenc sent them the score. In an interview with Claude Rostand dated 1954, he said:

When my song was finished, I sent it to Harvard. Kaboom! Meanwhile, the Prohibition Act had just passed, and made this work impossible to sing. Then I forgot all about it, when, twenty-eight years later, in 1950, being in Holland, the president of the admirable male choir of the Hague invited me to listen to a repetition of my prayers Of St. Francis of Assisi and ... of this "Song to drink". I confess I was in my little shoes because I had never heard it.

Twenty-eight years separate the composition of the work and its first performance in The Hague. Poulenc states: "I was ready to do a lot of retouching. What was not my amazement (...) of not having one note to change!."

== Structure ==
The work is written for an unaccompanied four-part men's chorus. The total performance time is approximately four minutes.

== Selected recordings ==
- Poulenc - Secular Choral Music, Norddeutscher Figuralchor, Jörg Straube (cond.), label MDG Gold, MDG9471595;
- Chansons française, Harry Christophers (cond.), label Technics, 1993

=== Bibliography ===
- 1978: Hell, Henri (1978). Francis Poulenc. Fayard. p. 388. ISBN 2-213-00670-9.
- 1995: Machart, Renaud (1995). Poulenc. Éditions du Seuil. p. 252. ISBN 2-02-013695-3.
