= Villanelle (Poulenc) =

- Chamber music by Francis Poulenc
- Catalogue: FP 74
- Composed: 1934
- Scoring: recorder; piano

Villanelle, FP 74, by Francis Poulenc is a piece of chamber music composed in 1934 for recorder and piano. The work was commissioned by the Australian Louise Hanson-Dyer, who inserted it into a collection of pieces for piano and recorder (entitled Pipeau).

Because of its modesty, this piece is rarely performed. The instrument for which it is written, the recorder, deprives it of a real notoriety. It is not mentioned in the catalog of works of the composer established by the biographer Henri Hell. (Note: p. 364–365)

A typical performance lasts about 2 minutes.

== Sources ==
- Hell, Henri (1978). Francis Poulenc (in French). Fayard. p. 388. ISBN 2-213-00670-9..
- Machart, Renaud (1995). Poulenc. Éditions du Seuil. p. 252. ISBN 2-02-013695-3..
