= Sinfonietta (Poulenc) =

1948 musical work

- by Francis Poulenc
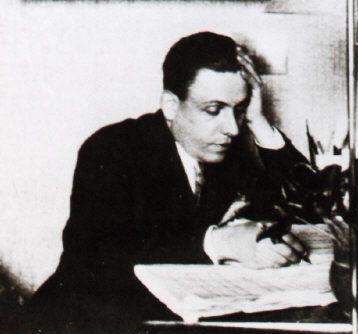
- Francis Poulenc in 1930
- Catalogue: FP 141
- Occasion: Anniversary of the BBC's Third Programme
- Composed: 1947
- Movements: Four
- Scoring: Small symphony orchestra

Premiere
- Date: 24 October 1948
- Location: London
- Conductor: Roger Désormière
- Performers: Philharmonia Orchestra

The Sinfonietta, FP 141, is a work for orchestra by Francis Poulenc. Composed in 1947 on a commission from the BBC, it was first performed in London on 24 October 1948, conducted by Roger Désormière. The work, light and full of dance rhythms, is in four movements.

== History ==
Poulenc, who initially was urged to study business by his parents, came to music late, without much formal education. He scored a success with a full-length ballet, Les biches, written on a commission by Diaghilev and premiered in Monte Carlo in 1924. A young audience cherished the unsophisticated fresh charm, and the composer received commissions in the wake of the success.

He composed the Sinfonietta in 1947 on a commission from the BBC for the first anniversary of their Third Programme. It was first performed in a broadcast concert in London on 24 October 1948, played by the Philharmonia Orchestra conducted by Roger Désormière. Poulenc made his first concert tour to the U.S. the same year, which increased his international recognition.

== Structure ==
The composition, Poulenc's only symphonic work, is in four movements:

1. Allegro con fuoco
2. Molto vivace
3. Andante cantabile
4. Très vite et très gai

The work is light and full of dance rhythms, at times satirical. The first movement begins forcefully but is contrasted with melodic elements. The second movement of scherzo character is reminiscent of the last movement of the ballet Les biches, and has "brief misterioso moments". The third movement is gentle, with an expansive melodic theme. The final recalls last movements by Haydn with "folksy" themes, and "scurries along to a breathless conclusion", as James Harding described in 1989 liner notes.

The Sinfonietta is scored for a small symphony orchestra consisting of 2 flutes, 2 oboes, 2 clarinets in B♭, 2 bassoons, 2 French horns (in F), 2 trumpets in C, harp, timpani, and strings.
