= Novelette (music) =

A novelette is "a short piece of lyrical music, especially one for the piano".

The word was used by the composer Robert Schumann as a title for some piano pieces, a choice that reflected his literary background and interests. The music in question (op. 21, and op. 99 no. 9) is episodic, however, and does not especially resemble a narrative. The name may also allude to Clara Novello.

Schumann was followed by Niels Gade, Theodor Kirchner, Stephen Heller, Anatoly Lyadov, and much later, by Poulenc (Trois novelettes), Lutosławski ("Novelette for Orchestra"), Chaminade, Tcherepnin, Josef Tal, and George Gershwin ("Novelette in Fourths").
