= Tel jour, telle nuit =

Composition by Francis Poulenc

- Nine melodies after Paul Éluard's poems
- by Francis Poulenc
- Catalogue: FP 86
- Year: 1937
- Text: Paul Éluard's Les yeux fertiles
- Language: French
- Published: 1937 - Paris
- Publisher: Éditions Durand
- Duration: 15 minutes approx.
- Movements: 9
- Scoring: Middle voice and piano

Tel jour, telle nuit or Tel jour telle nuit (Note: The original published title is Tel jour telle nuit, which is orthotypographically incorrect according to French grammar rules.) (in English: Like day, like night or As is the day, so is the night) is a song cycle consisting of nine songs by French composer Francis Poulenc. Based on poems by Paul Éluard, it was finished in 1937.

== Background ==
This cycle, one of the most famous by Poulenc, was written between late 1936 and early 1937. The original poems were taken from a Paul Éluard collection entitled Les yeux fertiles, first published in October 1936. The first to be completed were Une ruine coquille vide, Une roulotte couverte en tuiles, Une herbe pauvre, and Je n'ai envie que de t'aimer, all finished at an unspecified date in December 1936, at the composer's country residence in Noizay. Bonne journée and Nous avons fait la nuit were composed the next month, January 1937, in Lyon, whereas À toutes brides and Figure de force brûlante et farouche were composed that same month in Paris. Finally, the last piece to be composed was Le front comme un drapeau perdu, which was finished on January 27, 1937, in Monte Carlo. The songs were then rearranged to form a structurally coherent cycle. During the early days of January 1937, Poulenc also contacted Éluard to ask for a title of the work, as Poulenc didn't wish to use the title of any individual song. Éluard supplied four titles, with Tout dire being his favourite. However, Poulenc opted for his second suggestion, Tel jour, telle nuit, which references the contrast between the opening and closing songs.

Each song was dedicated to a different person. The first song, Bonne journée, was dedicated "à Pablo Picasso", as Éluard also dedicated the original poem to Picasso after visiting the first Picasso retrospective exhibitions in Barcelona, Madrid, and Bilbao in early 1936; Poulenc decided to keep the dedication, as the original untitled poem was published in a book entitled À Pablo Picasso (1936). The second song, Une ruine coquille vide, is based on the poem Je croyais le repos possible, and was dedicated "à Freddy" (Frédérique Lebedeff), a close friend and later mother of Poulenc's daughter. The third song, Le front comme un drapeau perdu, based on the original poem Être, was dedicated "à Nush", the poet's wife who was also part of the surrealist circle. The fourth song, Une roulotte courverte en tuiles, was dedicated "à Valentine Hugo", another surrealist artist and common friend of both Éluard and Poulenc.

The fifth song, À toutes brides, based on an untitled poem from Les yeux fertiles, and the sixth song, Une herbe pauvre, was dedicated "à Marie Blanche" (Marie-Blanche de Poulignac), who was an aristocratic patron and personal friend of Poulenc's, who also supported other contemporary composers and performers. The seventh song, Je n'ai envie que de t'aimer, also from Les yeux fertiles, was dedicated "à Denise Bourdet", a contemporary singer and acquaintance in Poulenc's circle of influence. The eighth song, Figure de force brûlante et farouche, was dedicated to long-time collaborator and champion Pierre Bernac, a baritone that performed frequently with Poulenc, premiered the cycle and performed it for recording in 1946. The ninth and last song, Nous avons fait la nuit, based on an untitled poem from Les yeux and previously published in his collection Facile, was dedicated "à Yvonne Gouverné", a pianist, singer and choir director who worked with Poulenc.

The cycle premiered just a few days after it was finished, in February 3, 1937. The premiere was carried out by baritone Pierre Bernac and the composer at the piano, and took place at the Salle Gaveau, in Paris. Bernac, who had less than a week to learn À toutes brides for its premiere, showed anxiety over having the music as soon as possible. On this, Poulenc stated in December 1936: "He pulls out these songs from me, one by one, which is turning my hair gray." The recital, which included Ravel's Histoires naturelles, as well as other pieces by Weber, Liszt, and Debussy, was a "great success", according to Paul Éluard's letter to his former wife Gala in February 14. Tel jour, telle nuit was published by Éditions Durand in Paris in 1937.

== Structure ==
The song cycle consists of nine songs for medium voice and piano. It has a duration of around 15 minutes. The movement list is as follows:

1. Bonne journée. Calme
2. Une ruine coquille vide. Très calme et irréel
3. Le front comme un drapeau perdu. Très animé
4. Une roulotte couverte en tuiles. Très lent et sinistre
5. À toutes brides. Prestissimo
6. Une herbe pauvre. Clair, doux et lent
7. Je n'ai envie que de t'aimer. Très allant et très souple
8. Figure de force brûlante et farouche. Presto (très violent)
9. Nous avons fait la nuit. Très modéré, sans traîner pourtant

== Recordings ==
The following is a list of recordings of Tel jour, telle nuit:

Recordings of Poulenc's Tel jour, telle nuit
Voice	Piano	Date of recording	Place of recording	Label
Pierre Bernac	Francis Poulenc	June 1946	Abbey Road Studio No. 3, London, UK	EMI Classics
Felicity Lott	Graham Johnson	February 1984	St George the Martyr, Queen Square, London, UK	Helios
Felicity Lott	Malcolm Martineau	September 2010	St Michael's Church, Summertown, Oxford, UK	Signum Classics
Sarah Fox	Graham Johnson	September 2011	All Saints' Church, East Finchley, London, UK	Hyperion

== Reception ==
The cycle has been positively received by musicians. Maurice Ravel, who was present at the successful premiere, is said by Poulenc to have "[touched] in his kindness both to the accompanist of his music and to the composer." Many musicologists and performers have noted the similarity of the piece's nature to that of Schumann's Dichterliebe, pianist Graham Johnson calling Nous avons fait la nuit "one of the greatest love songs in French music."
