= Soirées de Nazelles =

Composition by Francis Poulenc

- Variations by Francis Poulenc
- Catalogue: FP 84
- Composed: 1936
- Dedication: "to the memory of my aunt LIÉNARD, in memory of Nazelles"
- Scoring: piano

Les Soirées de Nazelles, FP 84, is a set of variations for piano written by the French composer Francis Poulenc. During the evenings, the composer used to sit at the piano and improvise "portraits" of his friends, all based on a given theme. The work was begun in 1930, and completed at Noizay on October 1, 1936.

At the beginning of the score, it reads:

The variations that form the center of this work were improvised at Nazelles during long country evenings wherein the composer played "portraits" for friends gathered around his piano.
We hope that these variations, each one somewhere between a first draft and a finished work, will have the power to evoke this game in the spirit of a Touraine region living room– with a window open to the night.

The composition is dedicated "to the memory of my aunt LIÉNARD, in memory of Nazelles". The score was published by Éditions Durand Salabert-Eschig.

== Structure ==
Les Soirées de Nazelles are composed of eight variations and a cadence, framed by a prelude (Préambule) and a finale. It takes about 20 minutes to perform. A complete recording by Tom Pascale lists the titles, tempo markings and durations as follows:

Variation	Title	Tempo	Duration
	Préambule	Extrêmement animé et décidé	3'37
I	Le comble de la distinction	Vif et gai	1'16
II	Le cœur sur la main	Modéré	2'41
III	La désinvolture et la discrétion	Presto	1'23
IV	La suite dans les idées	Très large et pompeux	1'59
V	Le charme enjôleur	Très allant	2'24
VI	Le contentement de soi	Très vite et sec	1'10
VII	Le goût du malheur	Lent et mélancolique	3'14
VIII	L'alerte vieillesse	Très rapide et bien sec	1'17
	Cadence	Très large et très librement	1'38
	Final	Follement vite, mais très prècis	3'39
