= Madeleine Ley =

Belgian writer and poet (1901–1981)

Madeleine Ley (5 May 1901 in Antwerp – 1981) was a Belgian writer and poet. Her father was the Belgian psychiatrist Auguste Ley.

== Biography ==
After the publication of some texts, Madeleine Ley gained notoriety in 1930, with the publication of her first collection of poems for children, Petites voix, several of which will be put to music by various composers, including Francis Poulenc, in 1936 and Georges Favre (Cantate du jardin vert, circa 1955). She then published a novel for children, L'Enfant dans la forêt (1931). After she entered into the literary world, she met Charles Vildrac, André Gide and Roger Martin du Gard. La Nuit de la Saint-Sylvain, a philosophical tale, appeared in 1935, then Olivia, her first real novel, in 1936, and a collection of short stories, Histoires tragiques, in 1939. Le Grand Feu, a narrative published by éditions des Artistes in Brussels in 1942 and reissued by Actes Sud (Arles) in 1988, won the Prix Victor-Rossel on manuscript in 1939.

Her mental health deteriorated during the Second World War, Madeleine Ley definitely stopped writing. Her condition therefore required constant psychiatric care.

Madeleine Ley is the mother of architect Jacques Wybauw.
