= Deux poèmes de Guillaume Apollinaire =

Composition by Francis Poulenc

- by Francis Poulenc
- English: Two poems of Guillaume Apollinaire
- Catalogue: FP 94
- Year: 1938
- Text: Il y a..., by Guillaume Apollinaire
- Language: French
- Published: Paris - 1939
- Publisher: Rouart, Lerolle & Cie.
- Duration: 6 minutes approx.
- Movements: 2
- Scoring: Voice and piano

Deux poèmes de Guillaume Apollinaire, FP 94 (in English: Two poems of Guillaume Apollinaire), is a song cycle by French composer Francis Poulenc, composed in 1938, with texts by poet Guillaume Apollinaire.

== Background ==
The Deux poèmes are a short cycle as, rather than being conceived to be a cycle, they were songs that was initially discarded and were then rewritten entirely. The first poem, Dans le jardin d'Anna, is a complex text, originally written by Apollinaire in 1901 during the poet's stay in Germany, after he met English governess Annie Playden. It presents a fictitious scenario by which the poet imagines himself and Annie living together as member of the 18th century German nobility. The poem got to Poulenc's hands after it was published in the collection Il y a... (1925). The composer made a first attempt to set the poem in 1931, but rejected the first draft as, according to himself, he did not understand, at that early stage, the despite all the different images, the secret of a song like that was that there should be a single tempo to bind together the contrasting scenes in the piece. The poem was finalized in August 1938, written in the town of Anost, and was dedicated to Reine Bénard.

The second poem, Allons plus vite, also comes from Il y a..., and represents a night walk through Paris in early summer. A poem that Poulenc had long wished to set, it was adapted first in 1935. However, the composer became dissatisfied with it and destroyed it. He returned to it in 1938, by juxtaposing different musical themes and characters corresponding to the poem's shifts of tone and location. The piece was finished in May 1938, a few months before Dans le jardin d'Anna, and was dedicated to fellow composer and member of Les Six Georges Auric.

The set was first published by Rouart, Lerolle & Cie., in Paris, in 1939, and later, by Éditions Salabert.

== Structure ==
This cycle consists of two songs for voice and piano. It has an approximate duration of six minutes. The song list is as follows:

1. Dans le jardin d'Anna. Très animé
2. Allons plus vite. Très calme

Both songs have a steady tempo from the beginning to the end, even though some expression markings are used sporadically for contrast. The songs omit key signatures, even though their harmonic language is tonal and characterized by frequent modulation. Poulenc also uses frequent changes of time signature. Even though both songs have a similar duration, the first song is 71 bars long, while the second one is 36 bars long.

== Recordings ==
Poulenc himself recorded Dans le jardin d'Anna on July 2, 1946, with baritone and long-time collaborator Pierre Bernac. The recording took place at Abbey Road Studio No. 3, in London, UK, and was later released by EMI Classics. The following is a list of recordings of the full cycle:

Voice	Piano	Date of recording	Place of recording	Label
Robert Murray	Malcolm Martineau	September 2010	St Michael's Church, Summertown, Oxford, UK	Signum Classics
Ivan Ludlow	Graham Johnson	September 2011	All Saints' Church, East Finchley, London, UK	Hyperion
