= Rapsodie nègre =

- Chamber music by Francis Poulenc
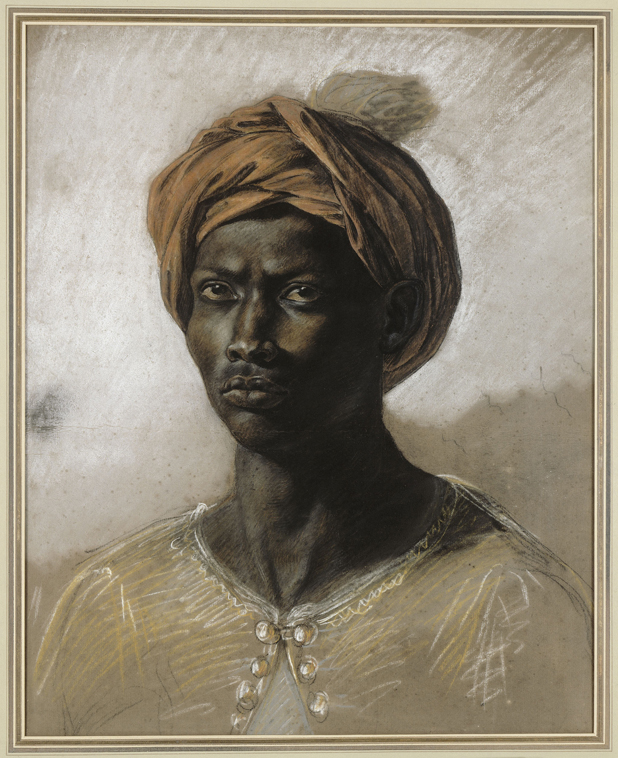
- Le Nègre au turban by painter Eugène Delacroix. Poulenc's work follows the fashion of "Art nègre", which was a hit in Paris at the beginning of the 20th century.
- Catalogue: FP 3
- Text: by "Makoko Kangourou"
- Language: French
- Composed: 1917
- Dedication: Erik Satie
- Performed: 11 December 1917: Paris
- Movements: 5
- Scoring: baritone; flute; clarinet; string quartet; piano

Rapsodie nègre, FP 3, is a work dating from 1917 by Francis Poulenc for flute, clarinet, string quartet, baritone and piano. It was the composer's first work to be publicly performed.

The piece is in five movements, three of them purely instrumental; the central interlude is for baritone and piano, and the finale features all the performers. The dedicatee of the piece is Erik Satie.

== History ==
By 1917 the 18-year-old Poulenc, who was then a pupil of Ricardo Viñes, had composed an unknown number of works. His biographer Carl Schmidt lists two earlier pieces known to have been destroyed by the composer, "Processional pour la crémation d'un mandarin" (1914) and Préludes (1916) both for solo piano. There was a fashion for African arts in Paris at the time, and Poulenc was delighted to run across some published verses, Les Poésies de Makoko Kangourou, supposedly edited by Marcel Prouille and Charles Moulié; the verses were purportedly Liberian, but were a hoax, full of nonsense and Parisian boulevard slang. The extract Poulenc chose to set for the vocal interlude and the finale read:

Honoloulou, pota lama!
Honoloulou, Honoloulou,
Kati moko, mosi bolou
Ratakou sira, polama!

Wata Kovsi mo ta ma sou
Etcha pango, Etche panga
tota nou nou, nou nou ranga
lo lo lulu ma ta ma sou.

Pata ta bo banana lou
mandes Golas Glebes ikrous
Banana lou ito kous kous
pota la ma Honoloulou.

The work was premiered on 11 December 1917, at one of a series of concerts of contemporary music organised by the singer Jeanne Bathori at the Théâtre du Vieux-Colombier. Poulenc later recalled the circumstances of the first performance:

At the last minute the singer threw in the towel, saying it was too stupid and that he didn't want to be taken for a fool. Quite unexpectedly, masked by a big music stand, I had to sing that interlude myself. Since I was already in uniform, (Note: Poulenc served in the French army towards the end of the First World War.) you can imagine the unusual effect produced by a soldier bawling out songs in pseudo-Malagasy!

The Rapsodie was an immediate success, and was performed several times over the next few years at various venues in Paris. The work won the approval of established composers, including Erik Satie, to whom it is dedicated, Maurice Ravel, and Igor Stravinsky, who was impressed enough to arrange a contract for Poulenc with a leading music publisher.

== Structure ==
The work, which plays for about 10 or 11 minutes, is in five movements:

1. Prélude – Modéré
  A gently-paced opening, in 4/4 time, which leads into the second movement.
2. Ronde – Très vite
  This movement begins with the unusual time signature of 8/8, before moving to the more normal 6/8 and then 2/4. The critic James Harding describes it as "breathless … a sophisticated Parisian version of a tribal dance."
3. Honoloulou – Vocal Interlude – Lent et monotone
  The winds and the string quartet do not play in this movement. It is in 2/4 time; the baritone, accompanied by the piano, sings the nonsense verse in "a monotonous descending figure that sticks maddeningly in the mind".
4. Pastorale – Modéré
  A gentle movement in 3/4.
5. Final – Presto et pas plus
  The longest of the movements, in a hectic 2/4, interrupted by a brief reprise of the slow baritone solo from the Interlude.

== Bibliography ==
- Harding, James (1994). Notes to CD set Ravel and Poulenc – Complete Chamber Music for Woodwinds, Volume 2. London: Cala Records. OCLC 32519527.
- Hell, Henri; Edward Lockspeiser (trans) (1959). Francis Poulenc. New York: Grove Press. OCLC 1268174.
- Poulenc, Francis (1978). Audel, Stéphane (ed.). My Friends and Myself. Translated by Harding, James. London: Dennis Dobson. ISBN 978-0-234-77251-5.
- Schmidt, Carl B (1995). The Music of Francis Poulenc (1899-1963) – A Catalogue. Oxford and New York: Oxford University Press. ISBN 978-0-19-816336-7.
- Schmidt, Carl B (2001). Entrancing Muse: A Documented Biography of Francis Poulenc. Hillsdale, NY: Pendragon Press. ISBN 978-1-57647-026-8.
