= Suite française (Poulenc) =

1835 orchestral suite by Francis Poulenc

Suite française French Suite
- Orchestral suite by Francis Poulenc
- Catalogue: FP 80
- Composed: 1935
- Movements: 7
- Scoring: 2 oboes, 2 bassoons; 2 trumpets, 3 trombones; snare drum, bass drum, cymbals; harpsichord

Suite française (French Suite), FP 80, is an orchestral suite for wind instruments, percussion and harpsichord (or harp ad libitum) by Francis Poulenc. It was composed in a neoclassical style in 1935 for Édouard Bourdet's la Reine Margot, and it was inspired by Claude Gervaise's dance collection Le livre de danceries.

== Structure ==
The suite has seven movements:

1. Bransle de Bourgogne
2. Pavane
3. Petite marche militaire
4. Complainte
5. Bransle de Champagne
6. Sicilienne
7. Carillon

A typical performance lasts about 14 minutes.

== Sources ==
- Hell, Henri (1959). Francis Poulenc. Translated by Lockspeiser, Edward. New York: Grove Press. OCLC 1268174.
- Tranchefort, François-René (1986). Guide de la musique symphonique. Fayard.
- Schmidt, Carl B. (1995). The Music of Francis Poulenc (1899–1963): A Catalogue. Oxford: Clarendon Press. ISBN 978-0-19-816336-7.
