= Métamorphoses (Poulenc) =

Composition by Francis Poulenc

- by Francis Poulenc
- Catalogue: FP 121
- Year: 1943
- Text: Louise de Vilmorin
- Language: French
- Published: 1944 – Paris
- Publisher: Rouart, Lerolle & Cie.
- Duration: 4 minutes approx.
- Movements: 3
- Scoring: Voice and piano

Métamorphoses, FP 121, is a short song cycle for voice and piano by French composer Francis Poulenc.

== Background ==
Poulenc based Métamorphoses on poems by Louise Lévêque de Vilmorin. The first song, Reine des mouettes, was based on a homonymous unpublished poem, whereas songs No. 2, C'est ainsi que tu es, and No. 3, Paganini, were published in de Vilmorin's collection Le sable du sablier, where the titles were Portrait and Métamorphoses, respectively. The cycle was written in close collaboration with baritone Pierre Bernac, who asked Poulenc to write songs based on de Vilmorin's text that would be suitable for a male voice and sent the composer the poem personally so he would work with them. The dedicated copy of the work sent to Bernac on December 25, 1945, was inscribed by the poet as follows: "Notre amitié est plus forte que les mouettes et les sables" (Our friendship is stronger than the seagulls and the sands), in a clear reference to the text used in the cycle.

Each song was dedicated to a different important person in Poulenc's life: Reine des mouettes was dedicated "à Marie-Blanche" (Marie-Blanche de Polignac), a notable patron and supporter of Poulenc who was also the dedicatee of some other songs in other sets; C'est ainsi que tu es, finished in August 1943 in Beaulieu-sur-Dordogne, was dedicated to Marthe Bosredon, whereas Paganini, finished in October 1943 in Noizay, was dedicated to Jeanne Ritcher, both of whom were a part of Poulenc's social circle. The set was published in 1944, in Paris, by Rouart, Lerolle & Cie., and later reprinted by Éditions Salabert.

== Structure ==
Métamorphoses consists of three songs for voice (specially, a baritone) and piano. With a total duration of around four minutes, it is one of Poulenc's shortest song cycles. The movement list is as follows:

1. Reine des mouettes. Très vite et haletant
2. C'est ainsi que tu es. Très calme, très à l'aise
3. Paganini. Prestissimo

Reine des mouettes is a fast, lively song in 4/4, even though it briefly turns to 6/4 for one bar halfway through the piece. It is in A♭ major, and it has a total of 21 bars. C'est ainsi que tu es is, in contrast, a lyrical, slow song, and a very representative piece of Poulenc's style. It is in 6/4, and only changes briefly to 4/4 to keep proportion. It is in the key of B minor and finishes in B major without changing its key signature. Despite having 18 bars in total, it is the longest piece in the set, doubling the other pieces' length. The last song, Paganini, is a very fast song, at . = 100. It is in E♭ minor and in an unchanging 3/4, but modulates very frequently, and loses its key signatures halfway through the piece. With a total of 79 bars, it is the shortest piece in duration.

== Recordings ==
The following is a list of recordings of Métamorphoses:

Recordings of Poulenc's Métamorphoses
Voice	Piano	Date of recording	Place of recording	Label
Pierre Bernac	Francis Poulenc	December 1945	Abbey Road Studio No. 3, London, UK	HMV / EMI Classics
Felicity Lott	Graham Johnson	February 1984	St George the Martyr, Queen Square, London, UK	Helios
Lisa Milne	Malcolm Martineau	September 2010	St Michael's Church, Summertown, Oxford, UK	Signum Classics
Sarah Fox	Graham Johnson	September 2011	All Saints' Church, East Finchley, London, UK	Hyperion
