= Deux mélodies de Guillaume Apollinaire =

Composition by Francis Poulenc

- by Francis Poulenc
- Catalogue: FP 123
- Year: 1945
- Text: Guillaume Apollinaire's Il y a...
- Published: 1945 - Paris
- Publisher: Max Eschig
- Duration: 4 minutes approx.
- Movements: 2
- Scoring: Voice and piano

Deux mélodies de Guillaume Apollinaire, FP 123 (in English, Two Melodies of Guillaume Apollinaire), sometimes also referred to as Montparnasse et Hyde Park, is a set of two songs by French composer Francis Poulenc.

== Background ==
The Deux mélodies were born out of Poulenc's life-long fascination with Polish-French poet Guillaume Apollinaire. Poulenc knew him as a teenager and arranged many of his works throughout his life. The poem adapted in this set were taken from Il y a... (1925), a collection of poem that had also served as inspiration to Poulenc in the past. These twinned pieces, which pianist Graham Johnson has described as "a tale of two cities" are based on two different areas: Montparnasse and Hyde Park. The first song, Montparnasse, took almost four years to complete, between September 1941 and January 1945, and was composed between Noizay and Paris. It was dedicated "à Pierre Souvtchinsky". On the other hand, the second song, Hyde Park, was finished in January 1945, in Paris, probably in a haste, as Poulenc had finished the longer, most worked-upon piece in the set. It was dedicated "à la mémoire d'Audrey Norman Colville", also known as Audrey Parr, a friend of Darius Milhaud, and a stage designer who lived in Hyde Park Gardens on the north side of Bayswater Road.

The set was published by Max Eschig in 1945. Baritone and collaborator Pierre Bernac recorded Montparnasse shortly after it was published, on December 11, 1945, with Poulenc at the piano. The recording, which took place at Abbey Road Studio No. 3, in London, was conducted and published by HMV, and was re-released by EMI Classics.

== Structure ==
This short song cycle consists of two songs with a total duration of around 4 minutes. It is scored for voice and piano. The song list is as follows:

1. Montparnasse. Très calme
2. Hyde Park. Follement vite et furtif

Montparnasse is in the key of E-flat minor, even though the tonal center fluctuates also with E-flat major and other keys. Even though it starts with a E-flat minor key signature, it is soon abandoned, and no key signature is present after the first few bars. It is in 2/4 and has a total of 73 bars. Poulenc specified that the piece should have a duration of two minutes and fifty seconds, an uncommon practice for the composer. Hyde Park is a much more lively piece, depicting the preachers of Hyde Park Corner. It is largely modal and with no clear tonal center. It is in 2/4 and has a total of 45 bars.
