= Piano Concerto (Poulenc) =

- by Francis Poulenc
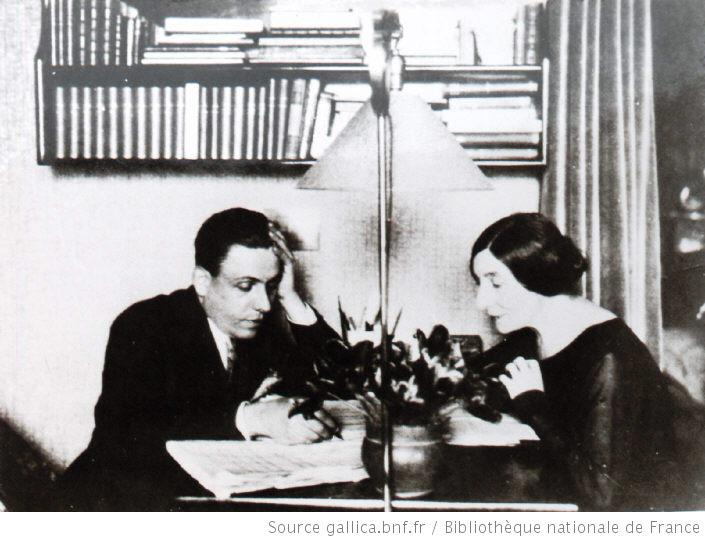
- Francis Poulenc and Wanda Landowska
- Key: C♯ minor
- Catalogue: FP 146
- Composed: 1949
- Movements: 3

Premiere
- Date: 6 January 1950
- Location: Boston
- Conductor: Charles Munch
- Performers: Boston Symphony Orchestra

The Piano Concerto in C♯ minor, FP 146, by French composer Francis Poulenc is the last of his five concertos. Written in 1949 on commission from the Boston Symphony Orchestra, it has three movements and a duration of about 19 minutes.

== Background ==
The tuneful, energetic concerto was commissioned by the Boston Symphony Orchestra to restore relations between Paris, Poulenc's hometown, and the United States after the Second World War. It was premiered by the BSO with Charles Munch conducting and the composer at the piano on 6 January 1950, but was not particularly well-received.

It was noted that there was "more sympathy than real enthusiasm," which the composer attributed to the notion that the audience had listened to too much Sibelius. One critic wrote in Le Figaro: "Certainly it isn’t a concerto at all but a little picture of manners, done up by a minor master." But Poulenc wrote: "I lead an austere existence in this very Puritan town."

== Structure ==
Each of the concerto's three movements is shorter than the one before:

1. Allegretto
2. Andante con moto
3. Rondeau à la française

=== I. Allegretto ===
A first theme in C♯ minor is exposed by the soloist to which other melodic motifs in a lyrical and sensual spirit gather around. A median largo of mystical inspiration follows before the resumption of the initial theme.

=== II. Andante con moto ===
The Andante con moto acquires a certain airy repose after its tender and sad start. There is first a rustic and melancholic theme in E♭ major, then follows a passage marked ''gracieux'' before the resumption of the starting theme and a coda where E♭ major alternates with E♭ minor.

=== III. Rondeau à la française ===
In the last movement, in hopes of appealing to American audiences, Poulenc incorporates the tune of Stephen Foster's "Swanee River" (some listeners alternatively believe that this section is in fact quoting the 15th century French song A la claire fontaine); Poulenc also incorporates various Brazilian Maxixe rhythms.

== Bibliography ==
- Schmidt, Carl B. (1995). The Music of Francis Poulenc (1899–1963): A Catalogue. Oxford: Clarendon Press. ISBN 9780191585166.
