= Clarinet Sonata (Poulenc) =

Musical composition by Francis Poulenc

Sonate pour clarinette et piano Clarinet Sonata
- Chamber music by Francis Poulenc
- Catalogue: FP 184
- Composed: 1962
- Dedication: Memory of Arthur Honegger
- Performed: 10 April 1963
- Movements: 3

The Sonate pour clarinette et piano (Clarinet Sonata), FP 184, for clarinet in B♭ and piano by Francis Poulenc dates from 1962 and is one of the last pieces he completed. It is dedicated to the memory of Arthur Honegger, who like Poulenc had belonged to the group Les Six. A typical performance takes 12–14 minutes.

== Structure ==
The sonata is in three movements:

1. Allegro tristamente (Allegretto – Très calme – Tempo allegretto)
2. Romanza (Très calme)
3. Allegro con fuoco (Très animé)

The structure differs somewhat from the fast-slow-fast pattern of a traditional sonata in that the first movement is itself split into three sections in the pattern fast-slow-fast. It bears the somewhat paradoxical subtitle "Allegro tristamente": accordingly, the piece is always in motion, but proceeds with a sense of grieving. After a brief fortissimo introduction consisting of angry spurts of figuration in the clarinet punctuated by piano chords, the piano quiets to a murmur. The clarinet's lines are built of a self-perpetuating series of arcs. During the slow section, a sense of grieving is developed, where the clarinet jumps between octave bs.

The Romanza begins with a solo statement from the clarinet before it is joined by the piano’s steady accompaniment. The lyrical melody line carries the sense of melancholy that could be found in the 1st movement but takes it to the very maximum.

The finale is rambunctious and energetic, complete with percussive piano accompaniment and shrieking clarinet passages that create a circus-like feel.

== Premiere ==
The clarinetist Benny Goodman, who commissioned the piece, was intended to premiere it with the composer accompanying. Poulenc died suddenly of a heart attack on 30 January 1963 before it was published, and an editor was employed to ascertain the identity of some notes, as well as provide missing dynamics and articulations. The premiere was given at New York City's Carnegie Hall by Benny Goodman and Leonard Bernstein on 10 April 1963. Harold C. Schonberg, music critic of The New York Times said that

Poulenc was not a 'big' composer, for his emotional range was too restricted. But what he did, he did perfectly, and his music shows remarkable finish, style and refinement.... The sonata...is typical Poulenc. In the first movement, skittish thematic elements are broken up by a broadly melodic middle section. The slow movement is one of those melting, long-phrased and unabashed sentimental affairs that nobody but Poulenc could carry off. Weakest of the three movements is the finale, which races along but has little immediacy. Here Poulenc's inspiration seems to have run out.

== Sources ==
- Daniel, Keith (1982). Francis Poulenc, His Artistic Development and Musical Style. Ann Arbor: UMI Research Press. ISBN 978-0-8357-1909-4
- Sadie, Stanley., & Tyrrell, J. (2001). The New Grove Dictionary of Music and Musicians. New York: Grove's Dictionaries. ISBN 1-56159-239-0
- Schmidt, Carl B. (1995). The Music of Francis Poulenc (1899–1963): A Catalogue. Oxford: Clarendon Press. ISBN 978-0-19-816336-7.
