= L'Album des Six =

1920 piano suite by Les Six

- Suite by Les Six
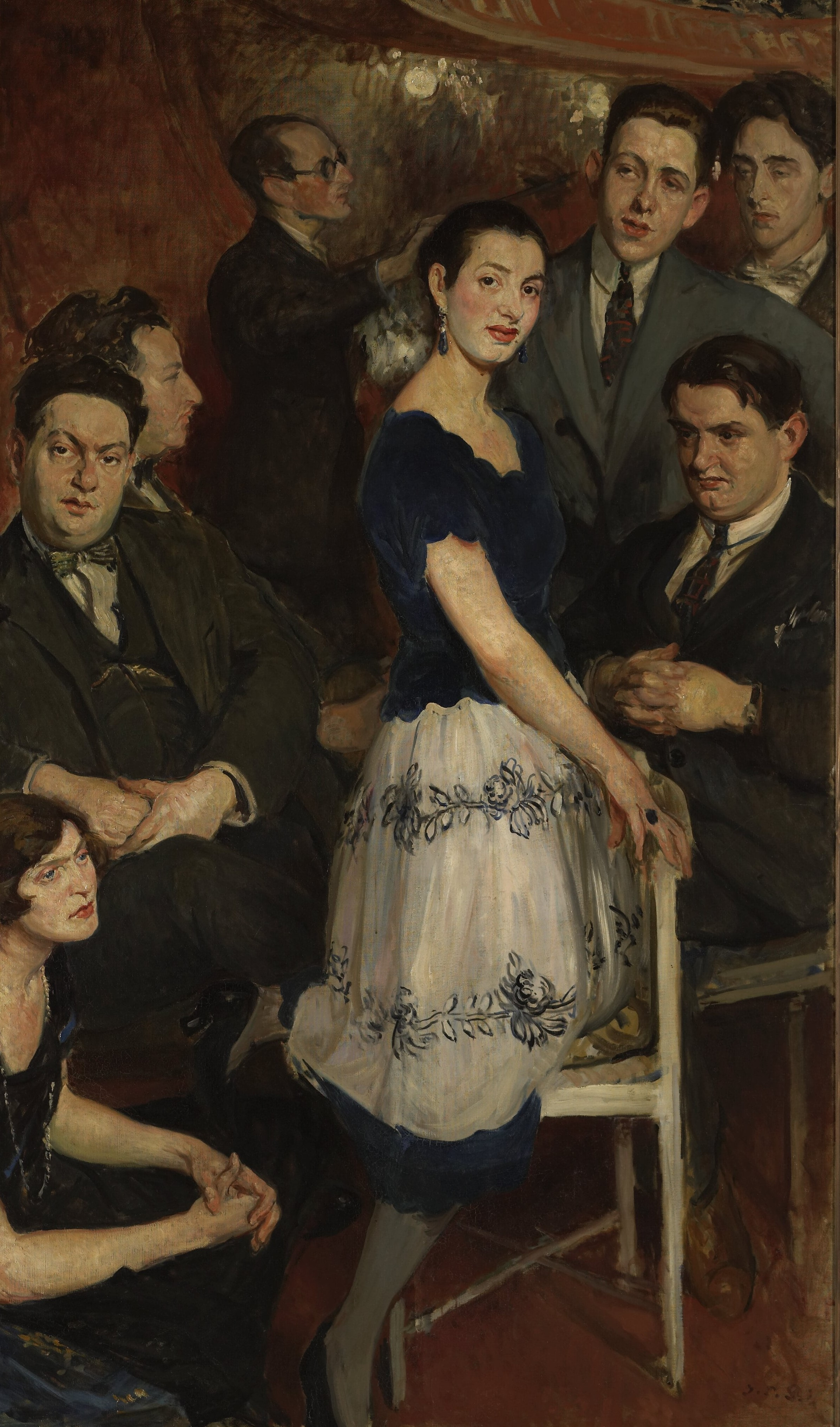
- Le Groupe des six, 1922, painting by Jacques-Émile Blanche. In this painting of eight people, only five of Les Six are represented.
- Composed: 1920
- Scoring: piano

L'Album des Six (original title: "Album des 6") is a suite of six piano pieces published in 1920 by Eugène Demets, and written by the members of the group of French composers known as Les Six.

== Background ==
This publication occurred in the same year as Les Six was first named as a recognisable group in French music. The journalist Henri Collet supplied that name in an article in the arts journal Comoedia published on 16 January 1920, which followed a joint concert by the six composers on 8 January.

The group was only ever a very loose association, and did not exist in order to create compositions collaboratively. However, there were six occasions on which more than one member was involved in joint compositional projects (sometimes along with composers from outside the group of Les Six). L'Album des Six was the first of these occasions, and it was the only time that all six composers were involved in the same publication.

However, most of the individual pieces had already been written prior to the group being identified by Collet in 1920 (most in 1919; Milhaud's piece as early as 1914), and they were simply collected and published under a joint title. Indeed, it has been suggested that the title of the album was a major factor in Collet's naming of the group.

== Structure ==
The pieces of L'Album des Six and their composers are:

- Georges Auric: Prélude (22 December 1919; dedicated to General Clapier)
- Louis Durey: Romance sans paroles, Op. 21 (August 1919; dedicated to Ricardo Viñes)
- Arthur Honegger: Sarabande, H 26 (January 1920)
- Darius Milhaud: Mazurka (1914)
- Francis Poulenc: Valse, FP 17 (July 1919; dedicated to Micheline Soulé)
- Germaine Tailleferre: Pastorale (4 September 1919; dedicated to Milhaud).

The suite takes about 11 minutes to play. Five of the pieces take less than two minutes each. The longest, Durey's Romance sans paroles, requires a little over three minutes.

Poulenc was the only one of the six composers to have left a major corpus of piano music; he also orchestrated his Valse in C in 1932.
