= L'Éventail de Jeanne =

1927 ballet

- Choreographer: Alice Bourgat; Yvonne Franck
- Music: Ten French composers
- Premiere: 4 March 1929; Paris Opera

L'Éventail de Jeanne (Jeanne's Fan) is a children's ballet choreographed in 1927 by Alice Bourgat and Yvonne Franck.

The music is a collaborative work by ten French composers, each of whom contributed a stylised dance in classic form:

1. Maurice Ravel (Fanfare)
2. Pierre-Octave Ferroud (Marche)
3. Jacques Ibert (Valse)
4. Alexis Roland-Manuel (Canarie)
5. Marcel Delannoy (Bourrée)
6. Albert Roussel (Sarabande)
7. Darius Milhaud (Polka)
8. Francis Poulenc (Pastourelle)
9. Georges Auric (Rondeau)
10. Florent Schmitt (Finale: Kermesse-Valse)

"Jeanne" refers to a Parisian hostess and patroness of the arts, Jeanne Dubost, who ran a children's ballet school. In the spring of 1927 she presented ten of her composer friends with leaves from her fan, asking each of them to write a little dance for her pupils. The children were dressed in fairytale costumes and the décor was enlivened by a set designed with mirrors.

It was produced in private at Jeanne Dubost's Paris salon on 16 June 1927, with Maurice Ravel playing a piano transcription of the music. It had its public premiere at the Paris Opera on 4 March 1929, with the ten-year-old Tamara Toumanova dancing the lead role. This was the first performance of Darius Milhaud's music there and he was so annoyed to debut with a trifling work that he boycotted the performance.

Excerpts have been recorded, particularly Ravel's Fanfare and Poulenc's Pastourelle. The first complete recording was made in 1984 by the Philharmonia Orchestra led by Geoffrey Simon.
