= Mouvements perpétuels =

- Piano music by Francis Poulenc
- Poulenc in 1922
- Catalogue: FP 14a
- Dedication: Valentine Hugo
- Performed: 1919

Mouvements perpétuels (French pronunciation: [muvmɑ̃ pɛʁpetɥɛl]), FP 14a, is a short three-movement solo-piano piece by French composer Francis Poulenc.

== Background ==
Mouvements perpétuels was premiered in Paris in December 1918, when Poulenc was aged 19 and a protégé of Erik Satie. The work is dedicated to the artist Valentine Hugo and was first performed by Poulenc's piano teacher, Ricardo Viñes. From January 1918 to January 1921 Poulenc was a conscript in the French army, but his duties allowed him time for composition. He wrote the pieces at the piano of the local elementary school at Saint-Martin-sur-le-Pré.

The suite was an immediate success with public and performers, and it remains one of the composer's most popular works. The pianist Alfred Cortot described the three movements as "reflections of the ironical outlook of Satie adapted to the sensitive standards of the current intellectual circles". The mature Poulenc merely tolerated the piece, judging it, like much of his lighthearted music, trivial in comparison with his more serious music. He wrote that "if people are still interested in my music in 50 years' time it will be for my Stabat Mater rather than the Mouvements perpétuels."

In a centenary tribute in The Times, Gerald Larner commented that Poulenc's prediction was wrong, and that in 1999 the composer was widely celebrated for both sides of his musical character: "both the fervent Catholic and the naughty boy". Larner added that despite the composer's high reputation abroad, the French had never fully grasped Poulenc's serious side and thus tended to neglect his music. The pianist Pascal Rogé commented, "French people don't like the image of themselves that Poulenc sends to them … they see him as superficial while they want to be seen as serious". The author and pianist Roger Nichols wrote: "Here the Parisian and provincial elements in Poulenc’s make-up jostle each other, with occasional attempts at coalescence: the tunes are superbly naïve (Ravel envied Poulenc his ability 'to write his own folksongs'), while the little flourishes with which each piece 'signs off' are the epitome of urban irony."

The suite takes about five minutes in performance. The commentators Marina and Victor Ledin write, "Each of the three pieces ends inconclusively, leaving the music unresolved, to linger in our minds". Poulenc described them as "ultra-easy", and compared them to a brisk stroll by the Seine. Poulenc made an arrangement of the work for 9 instruments in 1925.

== Structure ==
The piece has three movements:

1. Assez modéré (♩ = 144 in the published score)
  The movement consists of 24 bars. The first 19 bars are repeated. The final three bars are slower, and the last is marked Très lent (very slow).
2. Très modéré (♩ = 92)
  There are 14 bars in this movement. It is mostly p or pp, with only four bars marked mf. The movement ends with a ppp (pianississimo) two-octave upward glissando.
3. Alerte (♩ = 138)
  The finale is the most exuberant of the three, although like the second movement it ends ppp. It moves between 4/4, 7/4, 3/8 and 5/4 time. There are 58 bars.

== Bibliography ==
- Hell, Henri; Edward Lockspeiser (trans) (1959). Francis Poulenc. New York: Grove Press. OCLC 1268174.
- Ledin, Marina and Victor. Notes to Naxos CD 8.553930: Poulenc Piano Music, Volume 2. Hong Kong: Naxos. OCLC 884182629.
- Schmidt, Carl B (2001). Entrancing Muse: A Documented Biography of Francis Poulenc. Hillsdale, NY: Pendragon Press. ISBN 978-1-57647-026-8.
- Schmidt, Carl B. (1995). The Music of Francis Poulenc (1899–1963): A Catalogue. Oxford: Clarendon Press. ISBN 978-0-19-816336-7.
