= Noizay =

- Commune
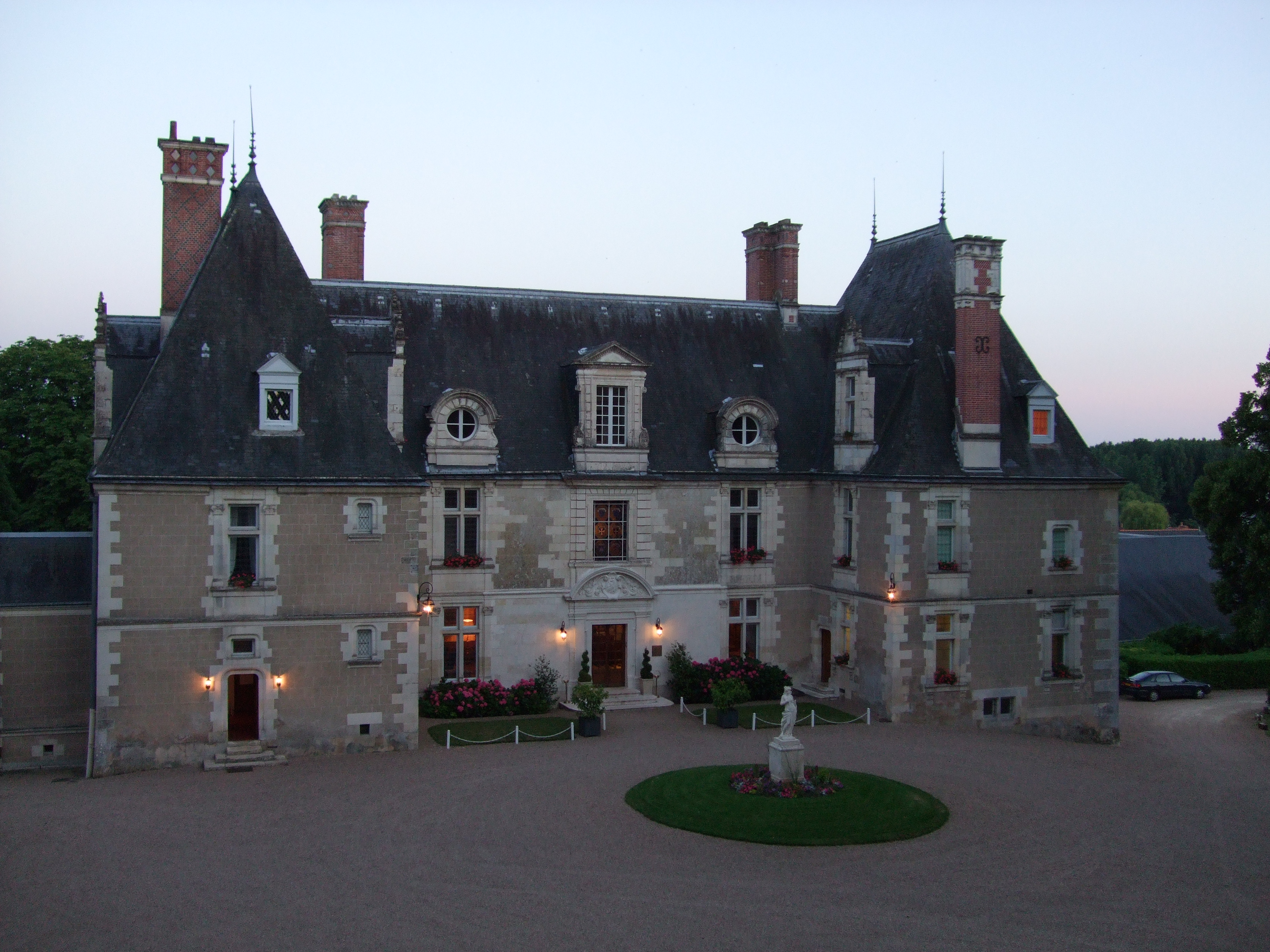
- Chateau

- Coat of arms
- Location of Noizay
- Location within France Location within Centre-Val de Loire
- Coordinates: 47°25′20″N 0°53′33″E
- Country: France
- Region: Centre-Val de Loire
- Department: Indre-et-Loire
- Arrondissement: Loches
- Canton: Amboise

Government
  - Mayor (2020–2026): Pierre Morin
- Area^{1}: 17.47 km^{2} (6.75 sq mi)
- Highest elevation: 114 m (374 ft)
- Lowest elevation: 48 m (157 ft)
- Population (2023): 1,168
  - Density: 66.86/km^{2} (173.2/sq mi)
- Time zone: UTC+01:00 (CET)
  - Summer (DST): UTC+02:00 (CEST)
- INSEE/Postal code: 37171 /37210
- ^{1} French Land Register data, which excludes lakes, ponds, glaciers > 1 km^{2} (0.386 sq mi or 247 acres) and river estuaries.

Noizay (French pronunciation: [nwazɛ]) is a commune in the Indre-et-Loire department in central France.

== Population ==
Historical population
Year	Pop.	±% p.a.
1968	862	—
1975	900	+0.62%
1982	957	+0.88%
1990	1,037	+1.01%
1999	1,155	+1.20%
2007	1,116	−0.43%
2012	1,148	+0.57%
2017	1,139	−0.16%
2023	1,168	+0.42%
Source: INSEE

== See also ==
- Communes of the Indre-et-Loire department
