= Grosse Fuge =

1826 composition for string quartet by Ludwig van Beethoven

- tantôt libre, tantôt recherchée
- Late string quartet by Ludwig van Beethoven
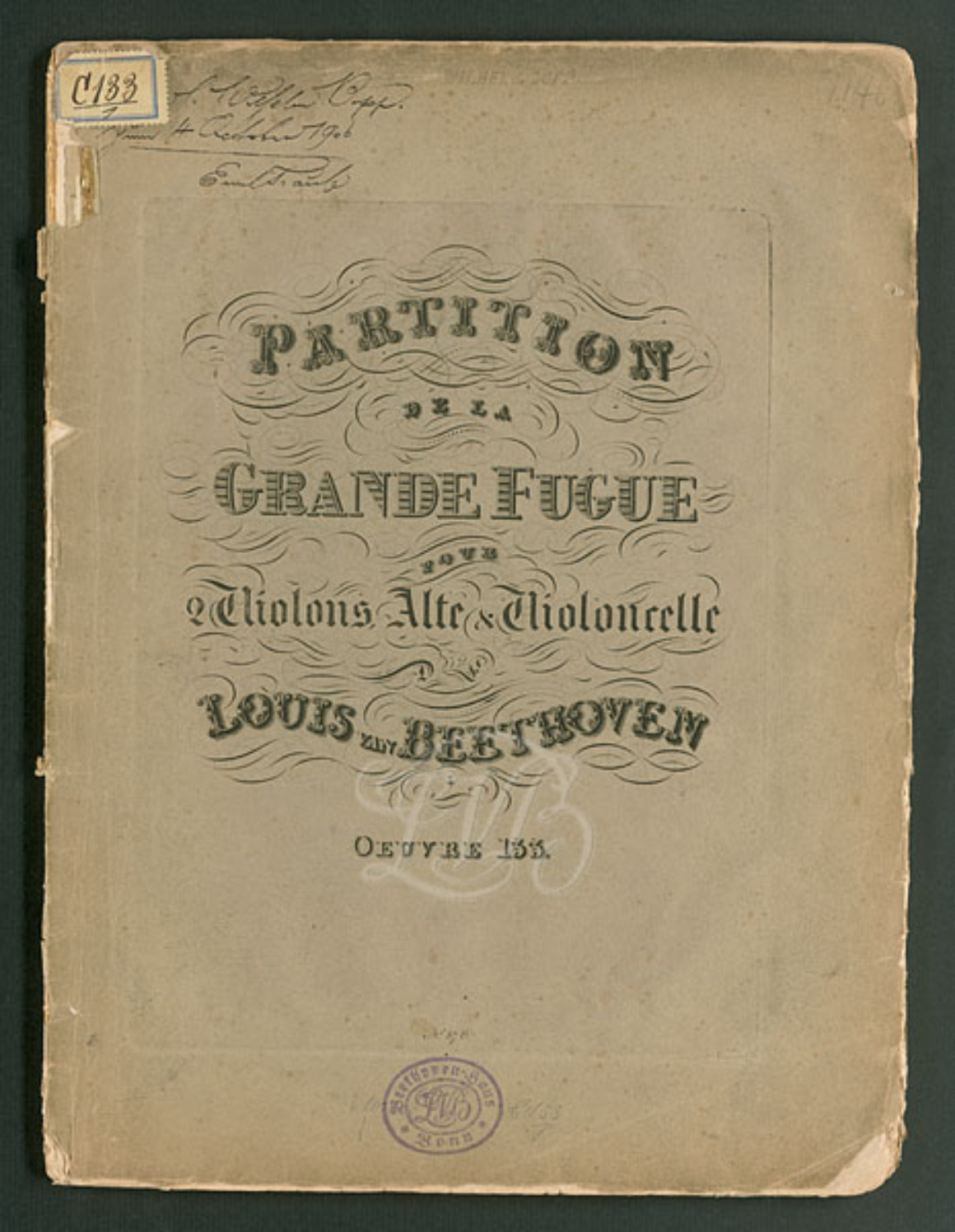
- Title page of the first edition of the Grosse Fuge, published in Vienna by Matthias Artaria in 1827 (in French, with the title Grande Fugue and Beethoven's French name "Louis")
- English: Great Fugue
- Key: B♭ major
- Opus: 133
- Form: Fugue
- Commissioned by: Prince Nikolai Galitzin
- Composed: 1825
- Dedication: Archduke Rudolf of Austria
- Recorded: Léner Quartet. Columbia Graphophone Company, 1930
- Duration: c. 16 min.
- Scoring: String quartet

Premiere
- Date: 21 March 1826
- Location: Gesellschaft der Musikfreunde, Vienna
- Performers: Schuppanzigh Quartet

Live performance
- Merel Quartet at Tonhalle, Zurich, 3 July 2013: Mary Ellen Woodside and Julia Schröder, violin; Ylvali Zilliacus, viola; Rafael Rosenfeld, cello: file; help

The Grosse Fuge (German: Große Fuge, also known in English as the Great Fugue or Grand Fugue), Op. 133, is a composition for string quartet by Ludwig van Beethoven. An immense double fugue, it was originally composed in 1825 as the concluding fifth movement of Beethoven's Quartet No. 13 in B♭ major, Op. 130. The Schuppanzigh Quartet gave the first performance on 21 March 1826.

The fugue was poorly received, and Beethoven composed a new finale for the quartet at the request of his publisher. The Grosse Fuge was published as a separate work in 1827 as Op. 133. The work was composed when Beethoven was deaf and is part of his late quartets. The composition is now considered one of Beethoven's greatest achievements.

== Composition history ==
Beethoven originally composed the fugue as the final movement of String Quartet No. 13 in B♭ major, Op. 130 in late 1825. The piece was commissioned by Prince Nikolai Galitzin along with two other string quartets in January 1823. Beethoven finished the project three years later. The copy of Op. 130 that Galitzin received in early 1826 had the fugue intact.

Soon after Galitzin's commission, Beethoven set to work. After finishing the String Quartet in A minor, Op. 132, he began work on the quartet in B♭ early in 1825. On 29 August, he estimated the composition would be finished in ten days. The two previous Galitzin pieces were published by Schott and Maurice Schlesinger. Beethoven sold the publishing rights for the B♭ quartet to Matthias Artaria in January 1826 for 80 ducats.

Beethoven ended other quartets with fugal forms, as had Joseph Haydn and Wolfgang Amadeus Mozart. Beethoven once quipped, "To make a fugue requires no particular skill...in my study days I made dozens of them. But the fancy wishes also to assert its privileges, and to-day a new and really poetical element must be introduced into the old traditional form."

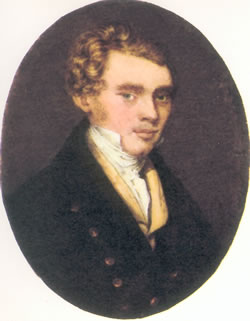
Karl Holz, violinist in the Schuppanzigh String Quartet and confidant of Beethoven

As Beethoven aged, his string quartets got longer. The Grosse Fuge sprawls over 741 measures of music. The finale dwarfs the rest of the quartet. During rehearsals at Beethoven's apartment, the Schuppanzigh Quartet struggled with the fugue. Ignaz Schuppanzigh's ensemble normally sight read music at their concerts. Second violinist Karl Holz joked with Beethoven that his was the only music that required practice.

The Schuppanzigh Quartet gave the premiere performance on 21 March 1826 at a house where the Gesellschaft der Musikfreunde hosted chamber music concerts in Vienna. The other movements were received enthusiastically, and the audience requested encores of the second and fourth movement. Beethoven was informed by his brother Johann that the music delighted "the whole city". The fugue was not a success. Its length and complexity challenged both the performers and the audience. One critic described it as incomprehensible.

After performing the premiere, Karl Holz, who was also the composer's secretary and confidant, told Beethoven about the encores for the second and fourth movements. Beethoven growled, "And why didn't they encore the Fugue? That alone should have been repeated! Cattle! Asses!"

Just a few weeks later on 11 April, Matthias Artaria asked Beethoven to approve a piano duet arrangement of the fugue. Publishing proofs for the string quartet were ready by August, but Artaria worried about the quartet's commercial potential. Karl Holz recalled:

Artaria...charged me with the terrible and difficult task of convincing Beethoven to compose a new finale, which would be more accessible to the listeners as well as the instrumentalists, to substitute for the fugue which was so difficult to understand. I maintained to Beethoven that this fugue, which departed from the ordinary and surpassed even the last quartets in originality, should be published as a separate work and that it merited a designation as a separate opus.

Artaria offered an additional fee for publication of the fugue, and Beethoven quickly agreed. Aside from the extra money, various justifications have been offered for why Beethoven acquiesced to Artaria. The lively final movement which replaced the fugue is in the form of a contredanse and is completely uncontroversial. Beethoven composed this replacement finale while staying at the estate of his brother Johann in Gneixendorf during the late autumn of 1826. It was the last completed score of his life.

In May 1827, two months after Beethoven's death, Matthias Artaria published the first edition of Op. 130 with the new finale, the Grosse Fuge as Op. 133, and the four-hand piano arrangement of the fugue as Op. 134. The fugue is dedicated to Beethoven's student and patron Archduke Rudolf of Austria.

== Form ==
Beethoven gave Grosse Fuge the subtitle tantôt libre, tantôt recherchée (sometimes free, sometimes learned). Harvey Grace pointed to a similar inscription in the Hammerklavier fugue and the overlapping meanings of "recherché" and ricercar: "sought out". Its form has been widely analyzed and compared to a steroidal Baroque fugue, a suite of smaller pieces, and even a symphonic poem in sonata form. The fugue's structure transcends normal syntax.

=== Fugue subjects ===
Primary subject of the Grosse Fuge

The subject of the Grosse Fuge is an eight-note chromatic motif that climbs an octave. Its shape has been compared to a wedge that approaches the second scale degree. The motif appears in various guises in several of Beethoven's late quartets, such as the first movement of String Quartet No. 15 in A minor, Op. 132. Similar motifs can be found in Christoph Willibald Gluck's Orfeo ed Euridice (1774) and Joseph Haydn's String Quartet in G, Op. 33, No. 5.

The subject also bears a striking resemblance to Johann Sebastian Bach's musical spelling of his surname. The four notes of the Bach motif are spelled in reverse by the final pitches of Beethoven's subject: B–C–A–B♭. As Beethoven was in the thick of composing the string quartet and wrestling with its finale, Friedrich Kuhlau visited him on 2 September. Kuhlau jotted the Bach motif in Beethoven's conversation book. In reply, Beethoven drunkenly scribbled out a canon using the motif. He sent Kuhlau a finished three-part canon on the motif with some lyrics that punned on the Danish composer's name. Bach's cryptogram appears in several Beethoven works from this period, including sketches for an overture based on the motif.

Beethoven considered several options for the fugue's second subject, including the "Ode to Joy" from his Ninth Symphony. He settled on an exuberant melody in a dotted rhythm with a few compound interval leaps. Vincent d'Indy characterized the primary subject as emblematic of serious thought and the second as thoughtless frivolity.

Second subject of the Grosse Fuge:

=== Overtura ===
Overture excerpts
Unison statement of fugue subject, measures 1–10

Second statement of subject, mm. 11–21

Third statement in the cello, mm. 21–5

Syncopated solo statement by first violin, mm. 26–30

The fugue opens with a 29-bar introduction that Beethoven called an overture in his manuscript. Beethoven asked for it to be played without pause after the Cavatina movement of the quartet. The final chord of the fifth movement includes the G that the quartet sounds in unison to begin the finale. The ensemble continues in unison to state the main fugue subject. The style and interval content are clearly linked to the very opening of the entire quartet.

Opening bars of Grosse Fugue:

In its second statement, Beethoven transposes the subject down to F major and gives it a quiet quarter note rhythm. The cello repeats the motif for a third time down an octave as the other instruments foreshadow the fugue's busy tempo.

The overture concludes with the first violin's solo statement of the primary theme in a syncopated rhythm. Beethoven has outlined his four major treatments of the theme in reverse order. The fugue proper will begin with the last version of the subject heard in the overture.

=== First fugue ===
First fugue excerpts
Exposition excerpt, measures 30–48

First variation excerpt, mm. 57–67

Second variation excerpt, mm. 109–112

Third variation excerpt, mm. 139–147

Following the overture is a double fugue in the key of B♭ major that follows all the rules of a Baroque fugue: an exposition and three variations, showcasing different contrapuntal devices.

The violin's countersubject dominates the opening. The viola plays the primary subject. The disjointed beginning is Beethoven's design. Affirmation of the main fugue subject only happens at the end of the piece. The opening is disjointed and chaotic. The fugue subjects are metrically misaligned and not complementary creating a problem that Beethoven solves over the course of the work.

The first variation opens in the subdominant key of E♭. The second violin takes up the dotted countersubject, and the viola plays the primary subject in its original guise. The first violin introduces a moto perpetuo triplet figuration which ornaments the counterpoint. The resulting polyrhythm increases the chaos of the opening fugue.

The second variation returns to B♭. The section has been described as "the hardest to understand-intellectually, aesthetically, and emotionally" in the piece. Beginning in bar 79, the viola and cello play the second subject in stretto. The perpetual triplets transmute into an alternating eighth note and two sixteenths gallop.

The third variation begins with the violin taking up the second subject in an exuberant triplet rhythm. The viola plays the primary subject at twice the speed.

As the violin plays the second subject one last time, it has doubled the span of its compound intervals, leaping over two octaves. The fugue hurtles towards greater chaos, and the section abruptly modulates to G♭ instead of resolving.

=== Meno mosso e moderato ===
Meno mosso excerpts
Opening of Meno mosso, mm. 159–171

Meno mosso, mm. 193–204

Conclusion of Meno mosso, 221–236

The new section in G♭ is marked Meno mosso e moderato (less quickly and moderate). This slower section resembles a sonata's traditional second movement, and it is also a double fugue.

The section has been described as a fugato because of the looser counterpoint. A flowing sixteenth note violin melody emerges as a subsidiary theme. The melody is played against sixteenth notes in the cello and second violin. Musicologist Joseph Kerman wrote about this sudden shift to a homophonic texture, "the effect is of an almost blinding innocence." When the second violin takes over the tune, the viola reintroduces the fugue's main subject.

The Meno mosso begins in a pianissimo dynamic. Leonard Ratner described the dynamic shift as a "wonderful change of color, offered with the silkiest of textures, and with exquisite moments of glowing diatonism." The quieter music comports with a tradition that dates to the rococo period where fugal passages would be marked forte and homophonic passages were rendered more gently in the galant style.

The counterpoint becomes more complex, with the cello and first violin playing the main subject in canon.

The polyphony gradually dissipates back into homophony. The quartet gently pulses a cadence in B♭ minor that bursts into the major key for the final fugue.

=== Allegro molto e con brio ===
Allegro molto excerpts
Interlude before final fugue, measures 233–269

Final fugue exposition, mm. 274–312

Mm. 354–390

Mm. 414–443

Mm. 453–484

The third fugue section has been likened to a scherzo. The music bursts into a fortissimo giguelike statement of the fugue subject. The music grows in intensity and shifts into A♭ major for a final learned fugue which finally gives the main subject pride of place. Initially, Beethoven is more intent on disfiguring or destroying the motif than affirming it.

When the cello states the theme in measure 273, it is augmented to fill each bar with one note. Beethoven now eschews the countersubject. The counterpoint derives instead from treatments of the subject. It is augmented, fragmented, and inverted to generate new material.

Beethoven pulverizes the theme into smaller segments until all that seems to be left is the trill. In measure 350, a continuous eighth note rhythm derived from the main subject pulses the music forward.

In measure 414, the music transitions to the dominant key of E♭ major. The violin erupts into a leaping melody which inverts the fugal subject. Beethoven's transformations are now more akin to his sonata writing than traditional fugues.

As Beethoven returns to the key of A♭ in measure 453, the subject is almost entirely reduced to three-note fragments. Dense strettos accumulate and build tension rather than resolve the section.

=== Thematic convergence and coda ===
Final excerpts
Meno mosso returns, measures 493–513

Recapitulation of allegro section, mm. 533–564

Fragments of preceding sections, before the coda, mm. 658–681

Finale, mm. 716–741

The meno mosso material returns as a march in measure 493. The violin restates the fugue subject, and the viola accompanies with its inversion.

A series of trills leads back to the home key of B♭, and a revisitation of the allegro molto material in measure 533.

Beethoven builds to a climax by quoting various fragments of the piece. The final section has often been described as a coda beginning in measure 657.

The Grosse Fuge ends with a soaring statement of the countersubject by the first violin, while the cello and the second violin affirm the primary subject. Beethoven withheld such a clear statement of his main subject until the end of the piece. The music has moved steadily from obscurity to coherence.

== Reception and musical influence ==
1930 recording
First published recording, performed by the Léner Quartet. Jenö Léner and Joszef Smilovits (violins), Sándor Roth (viola), and Imre Hartmann (cello).

[[:File:A. Schnittke - String Quartet no.3 - Canto Quartet.ogg|Alfred Schnittke's String Quartet No. 3 (1983)]]
This quartet quotes the main subject of the Grosse Fuge. Canto String Quartet: Eduardo Canto Arce and Guillem Cabre Salagre (violins), Marton Vineter (viola), and Teodora Nedyalkova (cello).

Allgemeine musikalische Zeitung reviewed the 1826 premiere and described the fugue as "incomprehensible, like Chinese" and "a confusion of Babel". The anonymous writer acknowledged the performers' struggles with the music made their performance tentative and suggested the work might become clearer in time. He praised the concision and high spirits of the second and fourth movements.

The fugue went unperformed until an 1853 concert by the Maurin Quartet in Paris. In the first edition of his musical dictionary, George Grove demurred about the piece, "one has no opportunity of judging, as it is never played". Ernest Walker described it in his 1905 book about Beethoven as an "uncouth inconsequence", "outlandish", and a perfect summation of the competing impulses of Beethoven's late period. Donald Tovey dismissed the work as beyond "the bounds of practical performance" in the 1911 Encyclopædia Britannica. In 1928, Joseph de Marliave suggested "the radical change" in attitude required to understand the Grosse Fuge meant that it and the Hammerklavier sonata "should be excluded from performance". Daniel Gregory Mason called the fugue "repellent" in 1947.

By the 1920s, some string quartets were beginning to include the fugue in their programs. As Beethoven's centenary approached in 1926, the Léner Quartet started recording Beethoven's complete string quartets for Columbia Graphophone Company. They made the first recording of the Grosse Fuge, which was released on December 17, 1930.

In 1927, Felix Weingartner had a string orchestra perform the Grosse Fuge for a BBC broadcast. Several listeners felt the piece was more suited to the larger group. Wilhelm Furtwängler made his own transcription for New York's Philharmonic Society. That same year, Erwin Stein argued that Arnold Schoenberg's technique was prefigured by Beethoven's "pondering of a musical idea" in the Grosse Fuge.

The fugue's subject can be seen as a precursor of the tone row. Oskar Kokoschka wrote to Schoenberg, "Your cradle was Beethoven's Grosse Fuge." Thomas Mann dramatized this musical evolution in his 1943 novel Doctor Faustus. His Schoenbergian protagonist is awakened to the possibilities of modern music after hearing a lecture about the Grosse Fuge.

Igor Stravinsky linked the tied eighth notes of the fugue's opening to Anton Webern's style. He raved, "the Great Fugue now seems to me...a perfect miracle...this absolutely contemporary piece of music that will be contemporary for ever...Hardly birthmarked by its age, the Great Fugue is as rhythm alone more subtle than any music composed in my own century...It is pure interval music, this fugue, and I love it beyond any other." Pianist Glenn Gould called it "not only the greatest work Beethoven ever wrote but just about the most astonishing piece in musical literature."

Pierre Boulez noted that Beethoven's counterpoint rebelled against harmonic function. Composer Alfred Schnittke quotes the subject in his third string quartet (1983). John Adams uses music from the late quartets including the Grosse Fuge in his 2012 composition Absolute Jest.

Music analysts and critics have described the Grosse Fuge as "eccentric" and "filled with paradoxes". Joseph Kerman characterizes it as "the most problematic single work in Beethoven's output and...doubtless in the entire literature of music". David Matthews concluded, "This music will always sound modern because it is stretching the limits of the possible...No fugue since has ever been quite so adventurous on every level."

== Interpretation ==
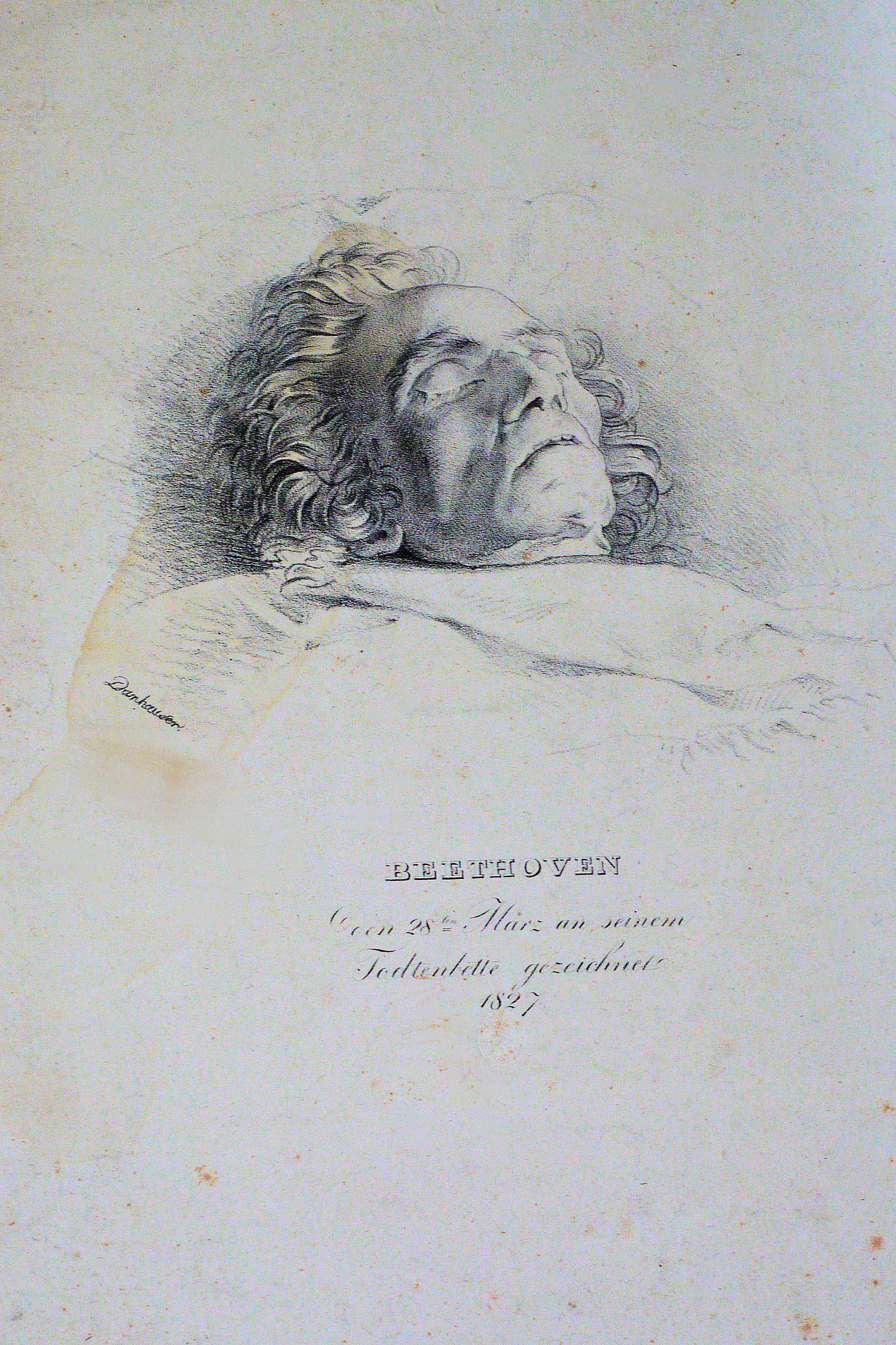
Lithograph of Beethoven on his deathbed, by Josef Danhauser

Since its composition, musicians, critics and listeners have tried to explain its tremendous impact.

A Beethoven biographer raved in 1927, "More than anything else in music this Grösse Fuge, regarded as the crown of the whole wonderful quartet, justifies the ways of God to men". A member of the Brentano String Quartet called the composition, "one of the great artistic testaments to the human capacity for meaning in the face of the threat of chaos."

Some critics see humor and light in the music. Another critic argued, "There is nothing comic about the Grosse Fuge...it presents a titanic struggle overcome." One writer felt the fugue, "speaks of failure, the very opposite of the triumphant synthesis associated with Beethovenian recapitulations."

Arnold Steinhardt, of the Guarneri String Quartet, describes the Grosse Fuge as "Armageddon...the chaos out of which life itself evolved". Another violinist plays the piece as if it is a "huge struggle...You need to finish the Grosse Fuge absolutely exhausted."

Sylvia Plath called the Grosse Fuge a "yew hedge" in her 1962 poem "Little Fugue". The poet Mark Doty wrote an expansive poem called "Grosse Fuge" which partially deals with the experience of listening to Beethoven's work.

== Performance challenges ==
The Grosse Fuge presents a host of performance challenges with its difficult passagework, as well as complex harmonies and cross-rhythms that require exact synchronization. Composer David Matthews describes it as "fiendishly difficult to play".

Performers must also decide whether to play the fugue independently or as the finale of Op. 130. One study found that ensembles perform the first three movements at slower tempi when their performance ends with the fugue. The character of the Op. 130 quartet changes completely depending on the decision. The current preference is to end the quartet with the fugue.

=== Tied eighth notes ===
Recordings of tied eighth notes
Alban Berg Quartett
Emphasis on the first eighth note.

Emerson String Quartet
Eighth notes are played as distinctly separate.

Brentano String Quartet
Some of the eighth notes are separated, some joined.

The main subject is syncopated, demonstrating the interrupted rhythmic statement technique described by Beethoven's teacher Johann Georg Albrechtsberger. It is also written as tied eighth notes instead of quarters. The visual influence of Beethoven's notation can induce anxiety.

Musicologists have scrutinized the notation. Elaborate interpretations have been proffered. Most likely, Beethoven was ensuring the notes endured for their full value. The performance practice at the time commonly shortened durations. This ambiguous notation was not uncommon. In 1756, Leopold Mozart explained the practice improved rhythmic accuracy.

The Alban Berg Quartett plays single notes with a subtle emphasis on the first half. Eugene Drucker of the Emerson String Quartet performs two distinct eighth notes. Mark Steinberg of the Brentano String Quartet sometimes joins the eighth notes, and sometimes separates them, marking the difference by playing the first eighth without vibrato, then adding vibrato for the second.

== Arrangement for piano four hands ==
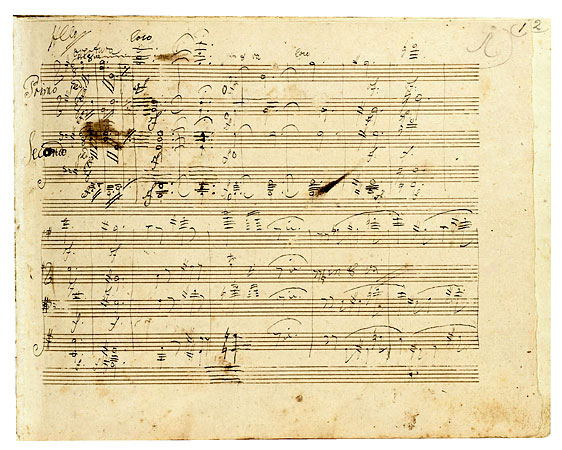
Manuscript of the Grosse Fuge arranged by Beethoven for piano four hands

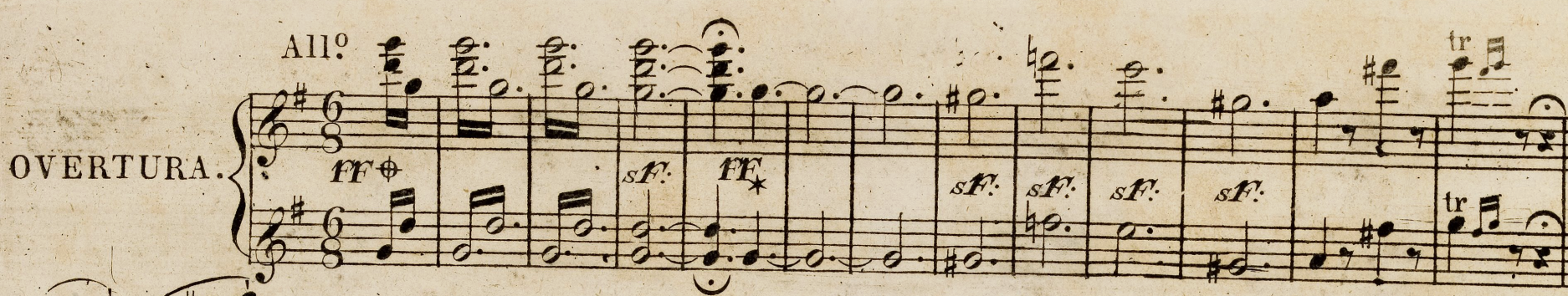

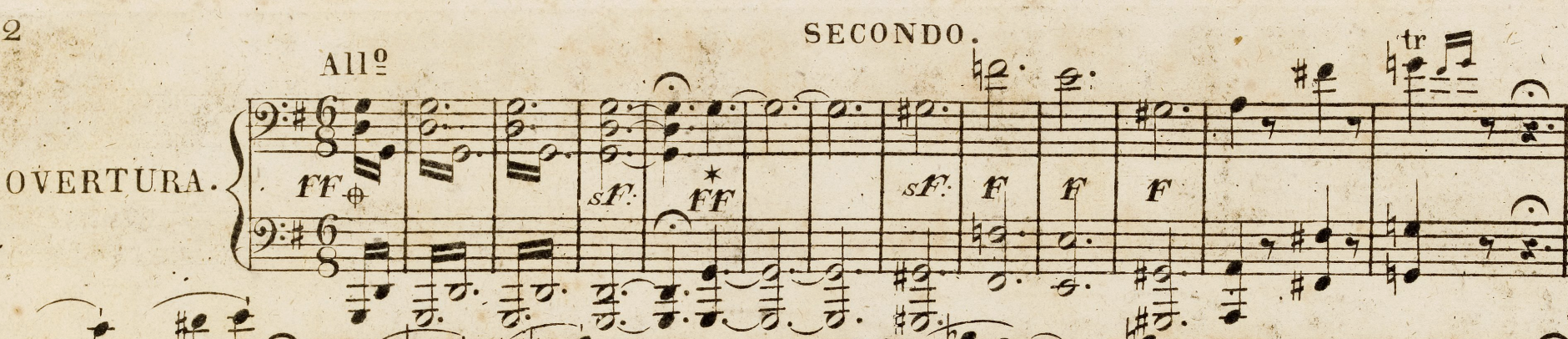
Incipit of Beethoven's Grosse Fuge transcription for piano four hands.

Matthias Artaria's claim of public interest in a piano duet version of the Grosse Fuge may have been a ploy to help convince Beethoven to separate it from the Op. 130 quartet. With Beethoven's approval, Artaria engaged Anton Halm to arrange the piece. The result was sent to Beethoven with a note from Halm explaining he had broken up some lines among the hands for convenience. Beethoven disapproved and began his own transcription. Beethoven completed the four-hand arrangement subsequent to the C♯ minor String Quartet, Op. 131. It was published by Artaria as Op. 134.

Alex Ross was struck by the tremolo chord Beethoven appended to the beginning of the fugue, "...apparently, he decided that the Gs needed more strength and weight. The manuscript shows that he squeezed in two extra tremolando bars, expanding the moment in time. He also added octaves above and below, expanding it in space."

Pianist Peter Hill felt Beethoven took "obvious care" with the transcription, "...he re-imagined a masterpiece in another medium, different from the original, but equally valid because equally characteristic of its creator."

In 1890, Cincinnati industrialist William Howard Doane purchased Beethoven's autograph at an auction in Berlin. When Eastern Baptist Theological Seminary was establishing a chapel in 1952, Doane's daughter made a donation which included Beethoven's manuscript and two by Mozart. In 2005, a librarian found the Beethoven score in a cabinet.

The manuscript was authenticated by Dr. Jeffrey Kallberg at the University of Pennsylvania and Dr. Stephen Roe, head of Sotheby's Manuscript Department. It was auctioned by Sotheby's on 1 December 2005 for GBP 1.12 million (US$1.95 million). The anonymous buyer was publicity-shy investor Bruce Kovner. He donated 139 original and rare pieces of music, including Beethoven's manuscript, to the Juilliard School of Music in February 2006. It is accessible in Juilliard's online manuscript collection.

Beethoven's arrangement went out of print. A very difficult, pianistic four hand version was created by Hugo Ubrich and Robert Wittmann. Harold Bauer also made a transcription which was more faithful to the original score.

== In theatre ==
- 1992: Die grosse Fuge, dance piece for 8 dancers by Anne Teresa De Keersmaeker, Rosas (dance ensemble)
- 2001: Grosse Fugue, dance piece for 4 dancers by Maguy Marin, Compagnie Maguy Marin
- 2016: Grosse Fugue, dance piece for 12 dancers by Lucinda Childs, Opéra National de Lyon

== Notes ==
=== References ===
==== Scores ====
- Beethoven, Louis van (1827). Grand Fugue (PDF). Vienna: Artaria – via IMSLP.
- Beethoven, Ludwig van (1860). Grosse Quartettfuge, Op. 133 (PDF). Berlin: Bote & Bock – via IMSLP.
- Beethoven, Ludwig van (1863). Grosse Fuge (PDF). Ludwig van Beethovens Werke, Serie 6, Band 2, No. 53. Leipzig: Breitkopf & Härtel – via IMSLP. Reprint. New York: Dover, 1970 – via IMSLP.
- Beethoven, Ludwig van (1937). Grosse Fuge (PDF) (Reprint ed.). Edwin F. Kalmus – via IMSLP.

Arrangements

- Beethoven, Ludwig van (1826). Grand Fugue à quatre mains (PDF). Matthias Artaria – via IMSLP. (manuscript).

=== Books ===
- Beethoven, Ludwig van (1825). Konversationsheft 93 (2. September 1825). Berlin State Library. pp. 36–37.
- Beethoven, Ludwig van (1864). Kühl, nicht lau, WoO 191 (PDF). Ludwig van Beethovens Werke, Serie 23: Lieder und Gesänge, No.256. Leipzig: Breitkopf & Härtel.
- Blum, David (1987). The Art of Quartet Playing. Cornell University Press. ISBN 0-8014-9456-7.
- Boulez, Pierre (1981). Nattiez, Jean-Jacques (ed.). Orientations. Translated by Cooper, Martin. Harvard University Press.
- Brand, Juliane; Hailey, Christopher (1997). Constructive Dissonance: Arnold Schoenberg and the Transformations of Twentieth-century Culture. University of California Press. ISBN 0520203143.
- Chua, Daniel K. L. (1995). The "Galitzin" Quartets of Beethoven. Princeton University Press. ISBN 978-0-691-04403-3.
- Cooper, Barry (2008). Beethoven. The Master Musicians. Oxford University Press. ISBN 978-0191592706.
- Cooper, Grosvenor; Meyer, Leonard B. (1966). The Rhythmic Structure of Music. University of Chicago Press.
- Gingerich, John (2014). Schubert's Beethoven Project. Cambridge University Press.
- Gleason, Howard; Becker, Warren (1980). Chamber Music from Haydn to Bartók. Frangipani Press. p. 40.
- Grace, Harvey (1927). Ludwig van Beethoven. Harper & Brothers.
- Grove, George, ed. (1879). A Dictionary of Music and Musicians. Vol. I. Macmillan & Co.
- Husarik, Stephen (2016). "Gluck's Theme and the Surrender of Ornamentation to the Countersubjects in Beethoven's Grosse Fuge, op. 133". In Speck, Christian (ed.). The String Quartet: From the Private to the Public Sphere. Brepols. pp. 251–261. ISBN 978-2-503-56800-3.
- Kahn, Robert S. (2010). Beethoven and the Grosse Fuge: Music, Meaning and Beethoven's Most Difficult Work. Scarecrow Press Inc. ISBN 978-0-8108-7418-3.
- Kerman, Joseph (1979). The Beethoven quartets. W. W. Norton. ISBN 978-0-393-00909-5.
- Kinderman, William (1995). Beethoven. University of California Press. ISBN 978-0-520-08796-5.
- Lockwood, Lewis (2005). Beethoven: The Music and the Life. W. W. Norton. ISBN 978-0-393-32638-3.
- Magome, Kiyoko (2022). "The Symbolism of the String Quartet in Thomas Mann's Doctor Faustus". In Klaeger, Florian (ed.). Symbolism: An International Annual of Critical Aesthetics. Boston: De Gruyter.
- Mason, Daniel Gregory (1947). The Quartets of Beethoven. Oxford University Press.
- Marliave, Joseph de (1961) [1928]. Beethoven's Quartets (reprint ed.). Dover.
- McCallum, Peter (2009). "The Process within the Product: Exploratory Transitional Passages in Beethoven's Late Quartet Sketches". In Kinderman, William (ed.). Genetic Criticism and the Creative Process : Essays from Music, Literature, and Theater. University of Rochester Press.
- Miller, Lucy (2006). Adams to Zemlinsky. Concert Artists Guild. ISBN 1-892862-09-3.
- Page, Tim (1990). Glenn Gould Reader. Vintage. ISBN 0679731350.
- Radcliffe, Philip (1978). Beethoven's String Quartets. CUP Archive. ISBN 978-0-521-29326-6.
- Ratner, Leonard G. (1995). The Beethoven String Quartets: Compositional Strategies and Rhetoric. Stanford Book Store. ISBN 1-887-98100-4.
- Roda y Lopez, Cecilio de (1907). Un Quaderno di autografi di Beethoven del 1825. Torino: Fratelli Bocca Editori.
- Rosen, Charles (1971). The Classical Style: Haydn, Mozart, Beethoven. Faber & Faber. ISBN 0-571-04916-8.
- Scherman, Thomas, ed. (1972). The Beethoven Companion. Doubleday.
- Solomon, Maynard (1980). Beethoven. Granada. ISBN 0-586-05189-9.
- Solomon, Maynard (2003). Late Beethoven: music, thought, imagination. University of California Press. ISBN 978-0-520-23746-9.
- Sonneck, O.G. (1927). Beethoven Letters in America. New York: The Beethoven Association.
- Stravinsky, Igor; Craft, Robert (1963). Dialogues and a Diary. Doubleday.
- Sullivan, J.W.N. (1927). Beethoven. The Life and Letter Series No. 15. London: Jonathan Cape.
- Thayer, Alexander Wheelock (1921b). The Life Of Ludwig Van Beethoven, Volume II. Translated by Henry Edward, Krehbiel. London: The Beethoven Association.
- Thayer, Alexander Wheelock (1921c). The Life Of Ludwig Van Beethoven, Volume III. Translated by Henry Edward, Krehbiel. New York: The Beethoven Association.
- Tovey, Donald (1911). "Beethoven, Ludwig van". Encyclopædia Britannica. Cambridge University Press. p. 649.
- Turnbridge, Laura (2020). Beethoven: A Life in Nine Pieces. Yale University Press.
- Turnbridge, Laura (2024). "Resisting Middlebrow Mediation: Beethoven's Grosse Fuge in Interwar Britain". In Guthrie, Kate; Chowrimootoo, Christopher (eds.). The Oxford Handbook of Music and the Middlebrow. Oxford University Press.
- Walker, Ernest (1905). Beethoven. Music of the Masters. New York: Brentano's.
- Watson, Angus (2010). Beethoven's Chamber Music in Context. Boydell & Brewer.
- Winter, Robert; Martin, Robert, eds. (1994). The Beethoven Quartet Companion. University of California Press. ISBN 0-520-20420-4.

=== Journals and other sources ===
- Anon. (10 May 1826). "Nachrichten". Allgemeine musikalische Zeitung. 28 (19): 310f.
- Anon. (13 October 2005). "Handwritten Beethoven score resurfaces". Canadian Broadcasting Corporation. Archived from the original on 12 March 2007.
- Associated Press (2 December 2005). "Beethoven rediscovered: $1.7 million 'Fuge'". Los Angeles Times.
- Badura-Skoda, Paul (February 1988). "A Tie Is a Tie Is a Tie: Reflections on Beethoven's Pairs of Tied Notes". Early Music. 16 (1): 84–88. doi:10.1093/earlyj/XVI.1.84. JSTOR 3127050.
- Bitloch, Sara (21 February 2012) The Borletti-Buitoni Trust. Elias String Quartet, Beethoven Op 130 & 133: an insight by Sara Bitloch on YouTube Archived 2021-12-12 at Ghost Archive
- Del Mar, Jonathan (February 2004). "Once Again: Reflections on Beethoven's Tied-Note Notation". Early Music. 32 (1): 7–25. doi:10.1093/earlyj/32.1.7. JSTOR 3519422.
- Clyne, Manfred; Walker, Janice (Fall 1986). "Music as Time's Measure". Music Perception. 4 (1): 85–119. doi:10.2307/40285353. JSTOR 40285353.
- Gingerich, John (Fall–Winter 2010). "Ignaz Schuppanzigh and Beethoven's Late Quartets". The Musical Quarterly. 93 (3–4): 450–513. doi:10.1093/musqtl/gdq017.
- Grew, Sydney (July 1931b). "The Grosse Fuge: An Analysis". Music & Letters. 12 (3): 253–261. doi:10.1093/ml/XII.3.253. JSTOR 726363.
- Grew, Sydney (August 1931c). "Beethoven: The ʻGrosse Fuge.ʼ An Exposition of the Larger Elements of the Form". The Gramophone. IX (99): 99–101.
- Grew, Sydney (October 1931d). "Beethoven's Grosse Fuge". The Musical Quarterly. 17 (4): 497–508. JSTOR 738813.
- Husarik, Stephen (Autumn 2012). "Musical direction and the wedge in Beethoven's high comedy, Grosse Fuge, Op. 133". The Musical Times. 153 (1920): 53–66. JSTOR 41703529.
- d'Indy, Vincent (1929). "Beethoven". Cobbett's Cyclopedic Survey of Chamber Music. Oxford University Press. p. 104f.
- Kirkendale, Warren (1963). "The 'Great Fugue' Op. 133: Beethoven's 'Art of Fugue'". Acta Musicologica. 35 (1): 14–24. doi:10.2307/931606. JSTOR 931606.
- Levy, David B. (Fall 2007). "'Ma però beschleunigend': Notation and Meaning in Ops. 133/134". Beethoven Forum. 14 (2): 129–149 – via Scribd.
- Matthews, David (September 2006). "Form Compelling". London Review of Books. 28 (18): 27–29.
- Wakin, Daniel J. (13 October 2005). "A Historic Discovery, in Beethoven's Own Hand". The New York Times.
- Wakin, Daniel (1 March 2006). "Juilliard Receives Music Manuscript Collection". The New York Times.
