= Beethoven-Haus (Krems an der Donau) =

Historic house museum in Austria

Beethoven House
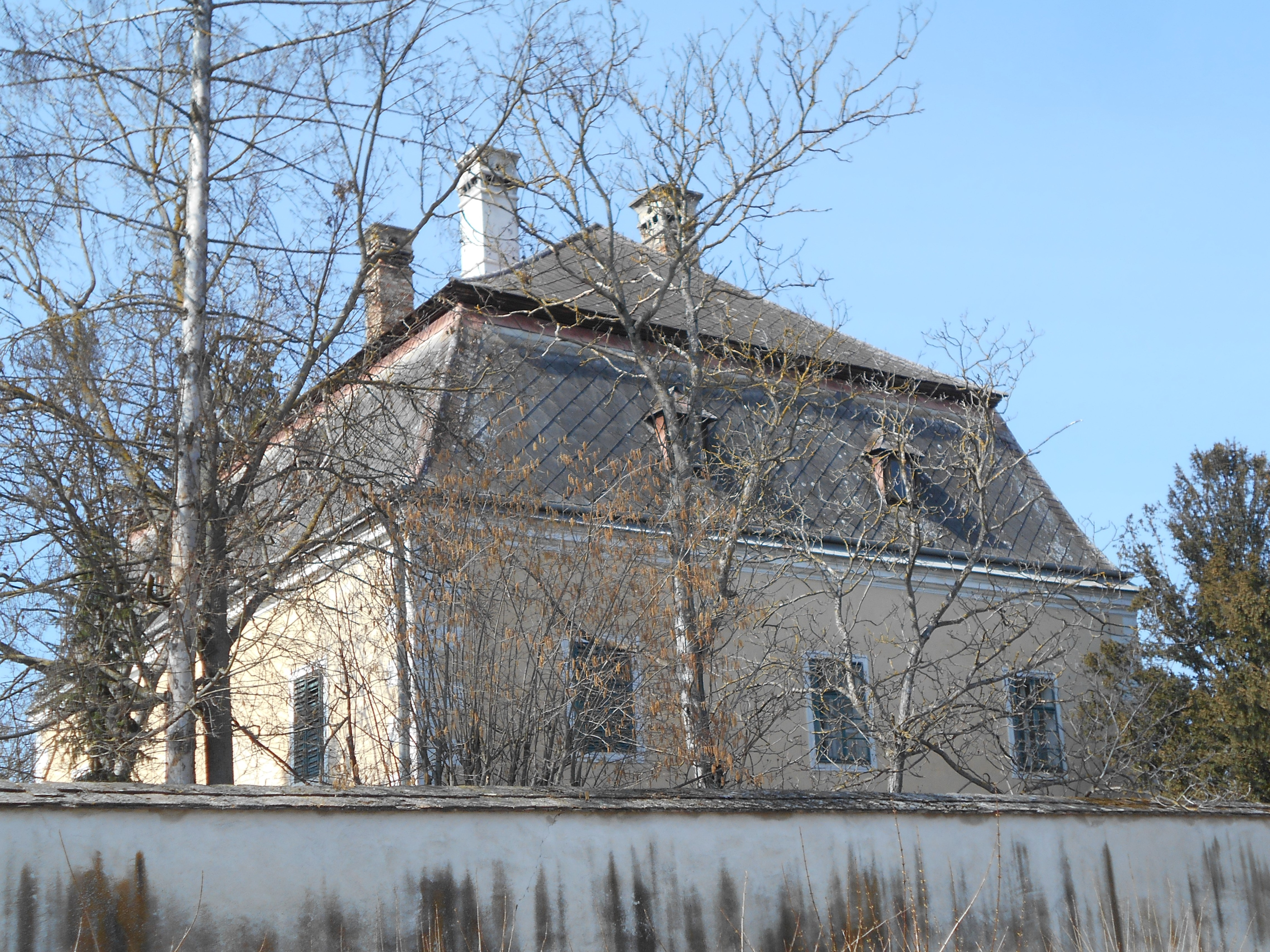
- Beethoven-Haus, 2021

- Location within Austria
- Location: Schloßstraße 19, Krems an der Donau
- Coordinates: 48°26′25.2″N 15°37′18.1″E
- Type: Private museum

The Beethoven House (Beethoven-Haus) is a private museum in the village of Gneixendorf near Krems an der Donau in Austria. It is a former residence of Ludwig van Beethoven and it is part of the cultural heritage of Austria. The current house museum is in dire need of restoration and is run as a private museum.

== History and description ==
The cubic building, known as the Trautingerhof, dates back to the 16th century at its core and received a mansard hipped roof in the late 18th century. The ground floor features groin vaults. The former Trautingerhof, now the Beethoven House, was owned in the 16th century, along with the Wasserhof Castle, by the Berchtesgaden Abbey. Both properties in Krems an der Donau were given to the Jesuits as a gift in 1630. From 1820 onwards, both properties were owned by Johann van Beethoven, the brother of Ludwig van Beethoven.

The elaborate neoclassical furnishings and decor date from around 1800 and the early 19th century. Wallpapers in the house depict romantic landscape paintings, trompe-l'œil architecture, and trompe-l'œil frames.

Beethoven came to his brothers house with his nephew and ward. His nephew had attempted suicide on 6 August 1826 and he had spent the weeks before their arrival in a hospital. Beethoven accepted his brother's invitation to stay over, and resided in the house between 25 September and 2 November 1826. The house is currently a part of the cultural heritage of Austria.

The residence features several rooms furnished as a private museum The museum offers tours by appointment. The rooms where Beethoven resided are on the second floor. It concerns four chamber, a large hallway and an adjoined piano chamber. The rooms have been decorated with various mementos. Also there are a hearth and lamps which originate from the composer's lifetime. In the garden, there is a large rock featuring a copper portrait of Van Beethoven.

In this residence he composed the new final movement of his String Quartet No. 13 (Beethoven) (opus 130). He had initially intended the Große Fuge to be the final movement, which was later renamed opus 133.

== See also ==
- List of music museums
- List of historical sites associated with Ludwig van Beethoven
