= Marguerite Long =

French pianist (1874–1966)

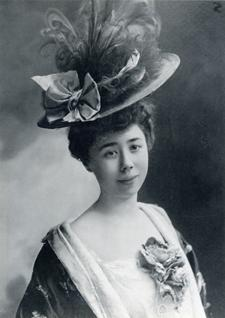
Marguerite Long ca. 1900

Marguerite Marie-Charlotte Long (13 November 1874 – 13 February 1966) was a French pianist, pedagogue, lecturer, and an ambassador of French music.

== Life ==
=== Early life: 1874–1900 ===
Marguerite Long was born to Pierre Long and Anne Marie Antoinette on November 13, 1874, in Nîmes, an old Roman town in the south of France. Long's parents were not musicians, but her mother highly emphasized the importance of music and "little Marguerite was not allowed to play wrong notes." Her sister, Claire Long, eight years older, was actually the person who influenced her in the pursuit of music. In 1883, when Marguerite was nine, Claire was appointed Professor of Piano at the Nîmes conservatory and Marguerite entered her sister's class for academic and musical studies. In 1886, shortly after receiving a Prix d’Honneur at the Nîmes Conservatory, Marguerite gave her first public performance at the age of eleven, performing Mozart's D Minor Concerto with orchestra.

After her debut, composer Théodore Dubois visited the Long family to encourage Marguerite to pursue her music studies in Paris. Even with several failed visits due to the bad health of her mother and the cancellation of the entrance exam of the Paris Conservatoire in 1888, Marguerite finally entered the Conservatoire in 1889, where she studied with Henri Fissot and took the Premier Prix from the Conservatoire on July 24, 1891. After the death of Fissot, Marguerite reached out to Antonin Marmontel, son of Antoine Marmontel who was Fissot's mentor, for lessons. He later on became a close friend to both Marguerite and her husband Joseph de Marliave, and even participated in the couple's wedding as one of their best men.

=== Marriage with Joseph de Marliave: 1906–1914 ===
Marguerite and Joseph first met in August 1902 in Castelnaudary. After her performance, the young officer, Joseph, requested that the pianist perform a work by Gabriel Fauré, who at the time was still an unknown composer. Even though Marguerite had to refuse, she began learning Fauré's work after the concert. On February 26, 1906, the couple got married in Saint-Jean-de-Lauragais, where Joseph was born, with Marmontel and Fauré as their best men.

Long's husband, Joseph de Marliave (1873–1914), was killed in August 1914 in action during World War I. The loss resulted in her fading away from public performances for the next three years. However, she lived through the tragedy with the belief that “What is important is not to spoil your life, but to be able to say to yourself: I did all I could. It is the only thing that can bring a little happiness.” Maurice Ravel dedicated the last movement, the Toccata, of his 1917 suite Le tombeau de Couperin to Marliave and Long gave the first performance of this work in 1919.

=== Marguerite Long and Gabriel Fauré ===
Shortly after the concert in Castelnaudary, Marmontel encouraged the pianist to learn Fauré's third Valse-Caprice, which she was able to perform for the composer in spring, 1903. The event led to another composition by Fauré, the Sixth Barcarolle, which the composer asked Marguerite to work on. It also initiated future collaborations in chamber music concerts between the two musicians.

In May 1904 when Long planned a concert of all-Fauré program, she received a warm letter from the composer praising her for the “most ideal perfection” playing. Shortly after Long's wedding to Marliave in February 1906, she was appointed Professor of the Paris Conservatoire by Fauré, who was the Director of the Conservatoire at the time.

Long's appreciation for Fauré's has certainly won her the title of being the one who “best understood Fauré’s music,” and whose “sensitivity best captured its very distinctive flavor.” Unfortunately, the friendship between Long and Fauré turned bitter. Some suspected that one reason was because of Fauré's newfound relationship with pianist Marguerite Hasselmans and the other was for not being promoted to “the professorship of a Classe Supérieure” at the Conservatorie in 1907 when her mentor, Marmontel, died. Long eventually succeeded Louis Diémer and received full professorship in 1920 and taught until 1940.

=== Marguerite Long and Claude Debussy: 1914–1919 ===
Ever since the attendance of Debussy's Pelléas et Mélisande performance in 1902, Long had felt a sense of inadequacy in playing Debussy's piano music and would feel disappointed in performances by other pianists of Debussy's work. However, because of Debussy's frequent appointments as one of the judges for the Paris Conservatoire during the years of 1910 and 1913, he eventually confronted Long and found out her fear of performing his composition. Eventually, Debussy invited Long to work alongside as an assistant artist. The year 1917 was hard for both Long and Debussy. Long was just coming out of the loss of her husband, while Debussy fought with the illness of cancer. During the summer of 1917, Long studied Debussy's approach in piano playing. Her faithful rendition of the composer's works earned not only the world's respect, but also Emma Debussy's recognition even after the death of her husband in 1918.

=== The 1920s: The postwar years ===
On April 11, 1919, Long premiered Ravel's Le Tombeau de Couperin, which was written during the war with each movement dedicated to friends of Ravel's who died in the war. Long would program this piece especially when she went on tours to neighboring countries. In 1920, she was finally granted full professorship as the first women professor at the Paris Conservatoire. Throughout the 1920s, she collaborated with three major orchestras: Lamoureux, Colonne, and the Société des Concerts du Conservatoire. During which time, she mainly programmed the following pieces: Schumann's A minor Concerto, Franck's Symphonic Variations, Beethoven's C minor and "Emperor" Concertos, Fauré's Ballade, and Debussy's Fantaisie. Her interpretation of Chopin's F minor Piano Concerto brought her tremendous success. In 1929, she made her first recording on this concerto and received praise that "Mme. Marguerite Long is certainly the artist whose piano playing records the best."

=== The 1930s: Marguerite Long and Maurice Ravel ===
Long and Ravel's friendship was solidified in the year 1932. With Ravel at the podium and Long at the piano, the two toured throughout Europe with Ravel's G Major Piano Concerto. After the premiere on January 21, 1932, they performed in Brussels, Holland, Austria, Germany, Rumania, Hungary, and Poland. It was in Vienna that Long met Richard Strauss, who became president of the jury for the Gabriel Fauré competition, which was established by Long in 1937 even though it didn't survive WWII. The same year marks the success of her concert career as she embarked on her first tour overseas, to South America. This trip to Brazil establishes her role as a musical ambassador of her country and specifically French music.

Similar to her connection with Fauré, Long's friendship with Darius Milhaud also originated with her husband, dating back to 1912. In 1933, shortly after Long's tour with Ravel on his G Major Piano Concerto, Milhaud asked Long to premier and be the dedicatee of his first piano concerto. The concerto was premiered on November 25, 1934. Milhaud also dedicated other smaller works to Long and her pupils, including Tour de l'Exposition, Enfantines for piano four-hands, and Album de Madame Bovary.

The 1930s was the time when Long received many national honors, including the Rosette de la Légion d'Honneur. In 1938, the French government awarded Long with the Cravate Rouge (Red Tie) and promoted her rank to Commandeur de la Légion d'Honneur, which honor was rarely given to a performer and especially not to a woman. Her international status is exemplified in the 1937 World Exhibition hosted in Paris. Eight composers, including Georges Auric, Marcel Delannoy, Jacques Ibert, Darius Milhaud, Francis Poulenc, Henri Sauguet, Florent Schmitt, and Germaine Tailleferre, collaborated in dedicating a collection of pieces to Long, titled A l'Exposition. On the other hand, nine foreign composers collected their pieces in a volume entitled Parc d'Attraction as an expression of their gratitude towards Long.

== Pedagogical career ==
=== The war years: 1939–1945 ===
Long resigned from her position at the Paris conservatory in 1940. During the same time, she established a close relationship with violinist Jacques Thibaud. With the help of Marcelle Lyon, a widow who was a music lover and an amateur pianist, Long and Thibaud were able to establish their school, focusing on the teaching of violin-piano sonata playing. Thibaud stated that "a violin school makes no sense unless it is in conjunction with the coaching of violin-piano sonatas, that is, the study of piano... To have pianists I immediately proposed a collaboration with our great artist Marguerite long." Madame Lyon, voluntarily provided her service to Long and Thibaud's school as the Director of the school. She later on became the Executive Director of Concours Marguerite Long- Jacques Thibaud.

Even though the war years reminded her of her loss during WWI, she remained positive and encouraged her students that "if my career has been what it is, it is because I never gave up, I always worked. My joy in life is work, because it will never betray you." Even though her concert career remained a major part of her life, she continued in her effort in cultivating young artists especially to ensure that the young generation would have their dream fulfilled even during the politically unstable time.

=== The postwar decade: 1946–1955 ===
At the end of the war, Long was in her 70s. Her career over about a decade centered on teaching. Her public masterclasses held on the first floor of Madame Lyon's house would attract pianists from all around the world. As the president of the National Organization Committee, Long was in charge of planning the centennial of Frédéric Chopin's death in 1949. Lecturers and masterclasses were given during between March and April 1949. Long also spent time in Poland as a member of the Chopin Competition jury in 1949.

=== Last years: 1956–1966 ===
In June 1956, the French government sponsored a concert at the Sorbonne in honor of Long's contribution to French musical life. She herself, now aged 81, played Gabriel Fauré's Ballade, Op. 19 with the Orchestre National de France under Charles Munch. The centerpiece was the first performance of a collaborative orchestral suite written in her honor by eight French composers, titled Variations sur le nom de Marguerite Long. In 1959, after teaching for over 60 years, Long published her own piano pedagogical book titled Le Piano. The book offers exercises, including five-finger exercises, trills, double notes, wrist, glissando, chords, octaves, etc., with Long's carefully written directions. Even though Long was invited to judge the 1966 Tchaikovsky Competition, she had already passed away before the commencement of the competition. Shortly before her death, Long became the first woman to receive the grand-croix de l'ordre national du Mérite. Marguerite Long died in Paris in 1966, aged 91.

== Concert reviews ==
Starting at a young age, Marguerite was heard frequently in the salons of Paris, and her typical concert programs included major piano works of the Romantic period as well as contemporary pieces. Liszt’s Fifteenth Rhapsody was a standard piece in her concert program.

Even though soloists were not popular around 1900 because of the campaign against “virtuosic music and in favor of pure, serious music”, Long participated in the performance of Franck’s Variations Symphoniques, receiving a positive review from Fauré saying: “To reach Perfection, the interpretation of the piano part of the Variations Symphoniques demands the clean, solid, impeccable virtuosity, the musical quality and proper sentiment, that the truly remarkable artist Marguerite Long exhibited yesterday. One could not play with better fingers, with more clarity and good taste, with a more charming and natural simplicity, and, I should add, with greater success." (November 23, 1903)

In February 1905, she collaborated with conductor Camille Chevillard, playing Beethoven's third concerto, Liszt's first concerto, and solo pieces by Bach, Scarlatti, Fauré, and Chopin. The concert won her positive reviews from La Nouvelle revue that her Beethoven Concerto was “played with admirable depth, emotion and joy”; the Liszt concerto “which is not only a prodigious accumulation of difficulties, but also a work full of chivalrous and noble passion, performed with an incomparable ardor and flame”; and “the Sixth Barcarolle, a delicious piece by G. Fauré, of whom Marguerite Long is the incomparable interpreter.”

Even with her fame and her appointment at the Paris Conservatoire, Long did not give her first concert outside of France until 1907. The London debut in February 1907 was also the British debut of Fauré's D minor Quintet.

In the 1930s, she premiered both Ravel's concerto (1932) and Milhaud's first concerto (1934), earning her the following reviews: "The concert of Sunday, November 25, was a beautiful festival of French contemporary music... It is the piano which leads, plays with the themes, discreetly emphasized by the orchestra soloists... It pales, of course, next to the prodigious Concerto by Ravel, which, under Long's magic fingers met another triumph, but it is a valuable asset to the modern pianist's repertoire."

== Ambassador of French music ==
It was in the year 1932 when Long first embarked on tours overseas to South America, specifically Brazil. The tour establishes her role as the ambassador of French Music, especially her influence as an artist, pedagogue, and lecturer. After WWII, she was invited internationally for performances and competitions. She served as a jury member for the following international competitions: 1949 in Warsaw for the Chopin Competition, 1952 and 1954 in Naples for the Casella Competition, and 1952 in Brussels for the Queen Elisabeth Competition. In 1954, after two decades, she finally returned to Brazil for a series of lecture on French music. With the invitation from the Brazilian government, Long also gave concerto performances in Rio de Janeiro and São Paulo. Even though Long performed in various countries, she regretted never traveling to the United States.

== The Concours Marguerite Long- Jacques Thibaud ==
In November 1943, Long and violinist Jacques Thibaud established the Marguerite Long-Jacques Thibaud International Competition for violinists and pianists, which takes place each year in Paris. The establishment of the competition was inspired by Long's attendance of the 1938 Ysaÿe Competition in Brussels, Belgium. The two musicians wanted to provide an opportunity for young artists to perform and compete during the time when war prevented traveling and performance abroad. With a first and second prize in each violin and piano category, the winners would receive a cash prizes, concert engagements, a recording contract with Pathé Marconi, and concerts with Jeunesses Musicales.

With the 1943 and 1949 success, the competition was reorganized to occur every two years (1951, 1953, 1955) and was recognized as one of the main piano and violin competitions in Europe. Even though the absence of her friend, Thibaud for the 1955 competition due to a plane crush on Thibaud's tour to Japan in September 1953, Long managed to host the competition. In 1957, the Ministére de la Culture and members of the French government started sponsorship and actively participated in the board. In 1961, Long assigned the foundation to the French state, officially switching from private to State competition. Since 1983, the competition changed to a three-year cycle, with the first for piano, the second for violin, and the third for gala concert with orchestra. Since 2011, the competition has included singers and it is now known as the Long-Thibaud-Crespin Competition, in honour of the soprano Régine Crespin.

== Literary works ==
- Le Piano, Salabert, 1959
- Au piano avec Claude Debussy, Julliard, 1960 (trad. anglaise 1972)
- Au piano avec Gabriel Fauré, Julliard, 1963
- La petite méthode de piano, Salabert, 1963
- Au piano avec Maurice Ravel, Julliard, 1971 (trad. anglaise 1973)

== Compositions dedicated to Long ==
- Germaine Tailleferre's 3 Etudes for Piano and Orchestra
- Gabriel Fauré's Fourth Impromptu, Op. 90 (1906)
- Gabriel Fauré's Fifth Impromptu, Op. 102 (1909)
- Rhené-Baton's Dans le style Rococo, Op. 23 (1921)
- Heitor Villa-Lobos' Francette et Piá, W237, (1929)
- Maurice Ravel's Piano Concerto in G (1931)
- Variations sur le nom de Marguerite Long, a collaboration between eight French composers (1956)

== Compositions premiered by Long ==
- Debussy's 12 Études (1917)
- Ravel's Le Tombeau de Couperin (1919)
- Philippe Gaubert's Sonata for Flute and Piano (together with the composer on the flute at a Société Nationale concert on March 22, 1919)
- Ravel's Piano Concerto in G (1932)

== See also ==
- See: List of music students by teacher: K to M#Marguerite Long.

== Bibliography ==
- Dunoyer, Cecilia, Marguerite Long: a Life in French Music, 1874–1966, (1993) (with discography)
- Long, Marguerite, Au piano avec Claude Debussy, 1960 (Eng. 1972)
- —, Le Piano, 1959
- —, La Petite Méthode de piano, 1963
- —, Au piano avec Gabriel Fauré, 1963 (Eng. 1980)
- Long, Marguerite and with Pierre Laumonier, Au piano avec Ravel, 1971 (Eng. 1973)
- Weill, Janine, Marguerite Long: une vie fascinante, 1969
