= Le Tombeau de Couperin =

Piano suite by Maurice Ravel

- by Maurice Ravel
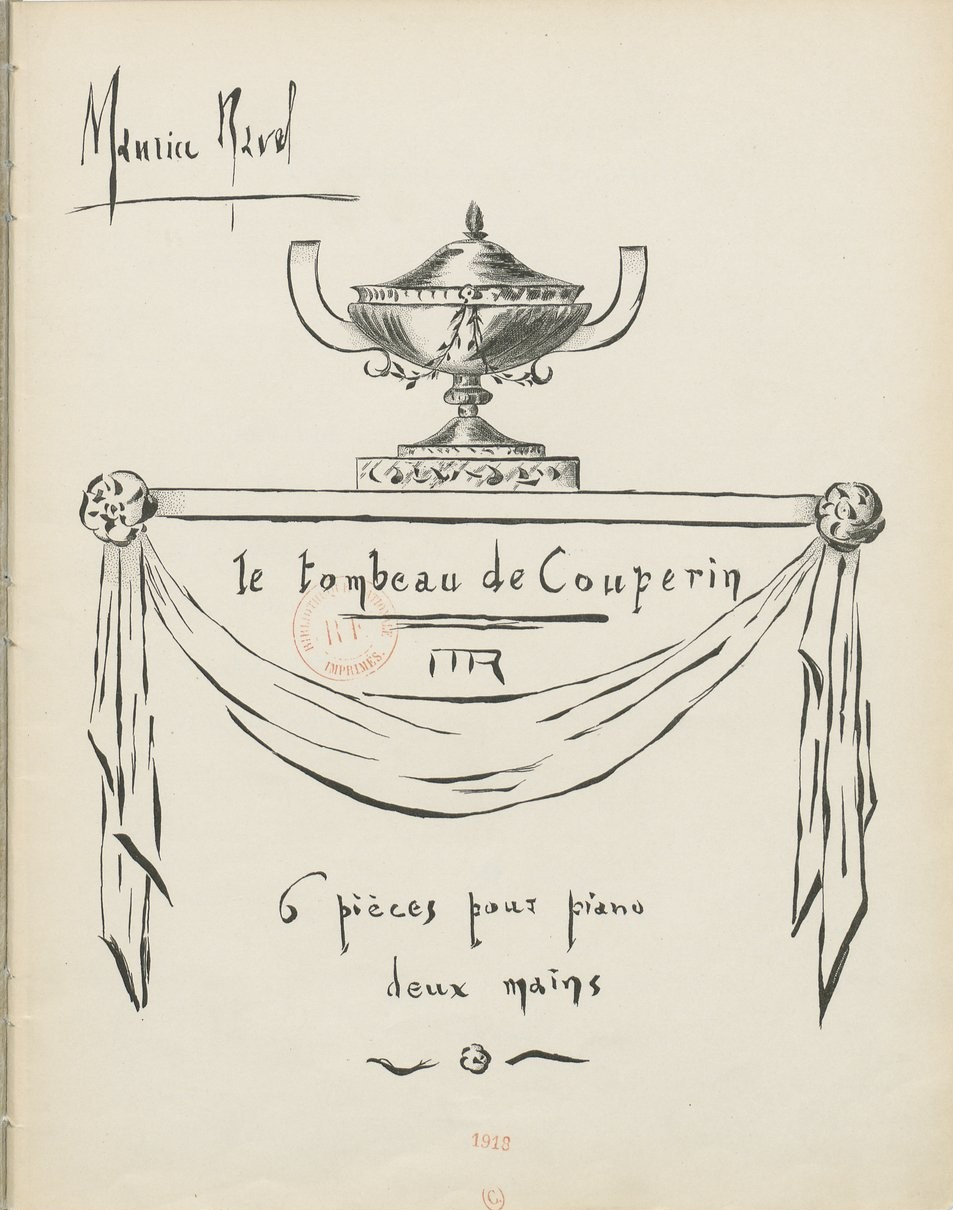
- Cover of the first edition published by Durand Cie (1918), designed by Ravel
- English: The Tomb of Couperin
- Catalogue: M. 68
- Composed: 1914–1917
- Performed: April 11, 1919; 107 years ago Salle Gaveau, Paris

Le Tombeau de Couperin (The Tomb of Couperin) is a suite for solo piano by Maurice Ravel, composed between 1914 and 1917. The piece is in six movements, based on those of a traditional Baroque suite. Each movement is dedicated to the memory of a friend of the composer (or in one case, two brothers) who had died fighting in World War I. Ravel also produced an orchestral version of the work in 1919, although this omitted two of the original movements.

== Overview ==
The word tombeau in the title is a musical term popular from the 17th century, meaning "a piece written as a memorial". The specific Couperin, among a family noted as musicians for about two centuries, that Ravel intended to evoke is thought to be François Couperin "the Great" (1668–1733). Ravel stated that his intention was to pay homage more generally to the sensibilities of the Baroque French keyboard suite, not necessarily to imitate or pay tribute to Couperin himself in particular. This is reflected in the piece's structure, which imitates a Baroque dance suite.

As a preparatory exercise, Ravel had transcribed a forlane (an Italian folk dance) from the fourth suite of Couperin's Concerts royaux, and this piece invokes Ravel's Forlane structurally.

The other movements are similarly based on Baroque forms, with the Toccata taking the form of a perpetuum mobile reminiscent of Alessandro Scarlatti.

Ravel also revives Baroque practices through his distinctive use of ornamentation and modal harmony. Neoclassicism also shines through with Ravel's pointedly twentieth-century chromatic melody and piquant harmonies, particularly in the dissonant Forlane.

== Composition ==
The movements are as follows:

No.	Name	Tempo	Time	Tempo	Key	Dedication	Audio
I.	Prélude	Vif	12/16	. = 92	E minor	in memory of First Lieutenant Jacques Charlot (transcriber of Ma mère l'oye for piano solo)	
II.	Fugue	Allegro moderato	4/4	= 84	E minor	in memory of Second Lieutenant Jean Cruppi (to whose mother, Louise Cruppi, Ravel had also dedicated L'heure espagnole)	
III.	Forlane	Allegretto	6/8	. = 96	E minor	in memory of First Lieutenant Gabriel Deluc (a Basque painter from Saint-Jean-de-Luz)	
IV.	Rigaudon	Assez vif	2/4	= 120	C major	in memory of Pierre and Pascal Gaudin (two brothers and childhood friends of Ravel, killed by the same shell in November 1914)	
V.	Menuet	Allegro moderato	3/4	= 92	G major	in memory of Jean Dreyfus (at whose home Ravel recuperated after he was demobilized)	
VI.	Toccata	Vif	2/4	= 144	E minor, ending in E major	in memory of Captain Joseph de Marliave (musicologist and husband of Marguerite Long)	

== Reception ==
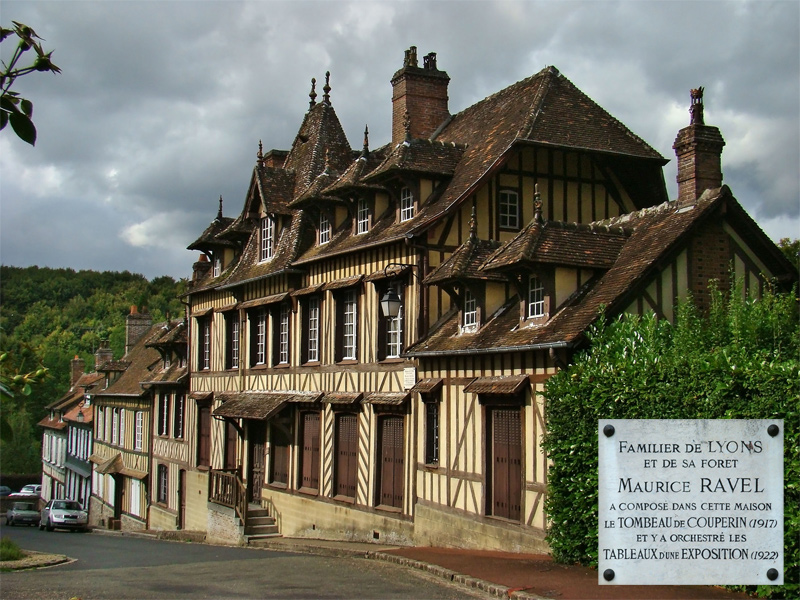
The house where Ravel composed the work

Written after the death of Ravel's mother in 1917 and of friends who died in the First World War, Le Tombeau de Couperin is a light-hearted, and sometimes reflective work rather than a sombre one that Ravel explained in response to criticism saying, "The dead are sad enough, in their eternal silence."

The first performance of the original piano version was given on 11 April 1919 by Marguerite Long, in the Salle Gaveau in Paris. Long was the widow of Joseph de Marliave, to whom the last movement of the piece, the Toccata, is dedicated.

== Orchestrations and transcriptions ==
A poster advertising Le tombeau and other 1920s Ballets suédois productions at the Théâtre des Champs-Élysées

In 1919 Ravel orchestrated four movements of the work (Prélude, Forlane, Menuet, and Rigaudon); this version was premiered in February 1920 by Rhené-Baton and the Pasdeloup Orchestra, and has remained one of the more popular works of Ravel. The orchestral version clarifies the harmonic language of the suite and brings sharpness to its classical dance rhythms. The oboe features prominently, taking the melody in the Prélude and the Menuet, as well as for the pastoral C minor section of the Rigaudon, where it is accompanied by guitar-like pizzicati.

The orchestrated version is scored for two flutes (one doubling piccolo), two oboes (one doubling cor anglais), two clarinets, two bassoons, two horns, trumpet, harp, and strings.

Four movements (Prélude, Fugue, Menuet, and Rigaudon) have been arranged for wind quintet by American horn player Mason Jones (1919–2009). Danish composer Hans Abrahamsen has also transcribed four movements for wind quintet, and further, American composer Gunther Schuller has made a wind-quintet arrangement.
