= Gabriel Deluc =

French painter (1883–1916)

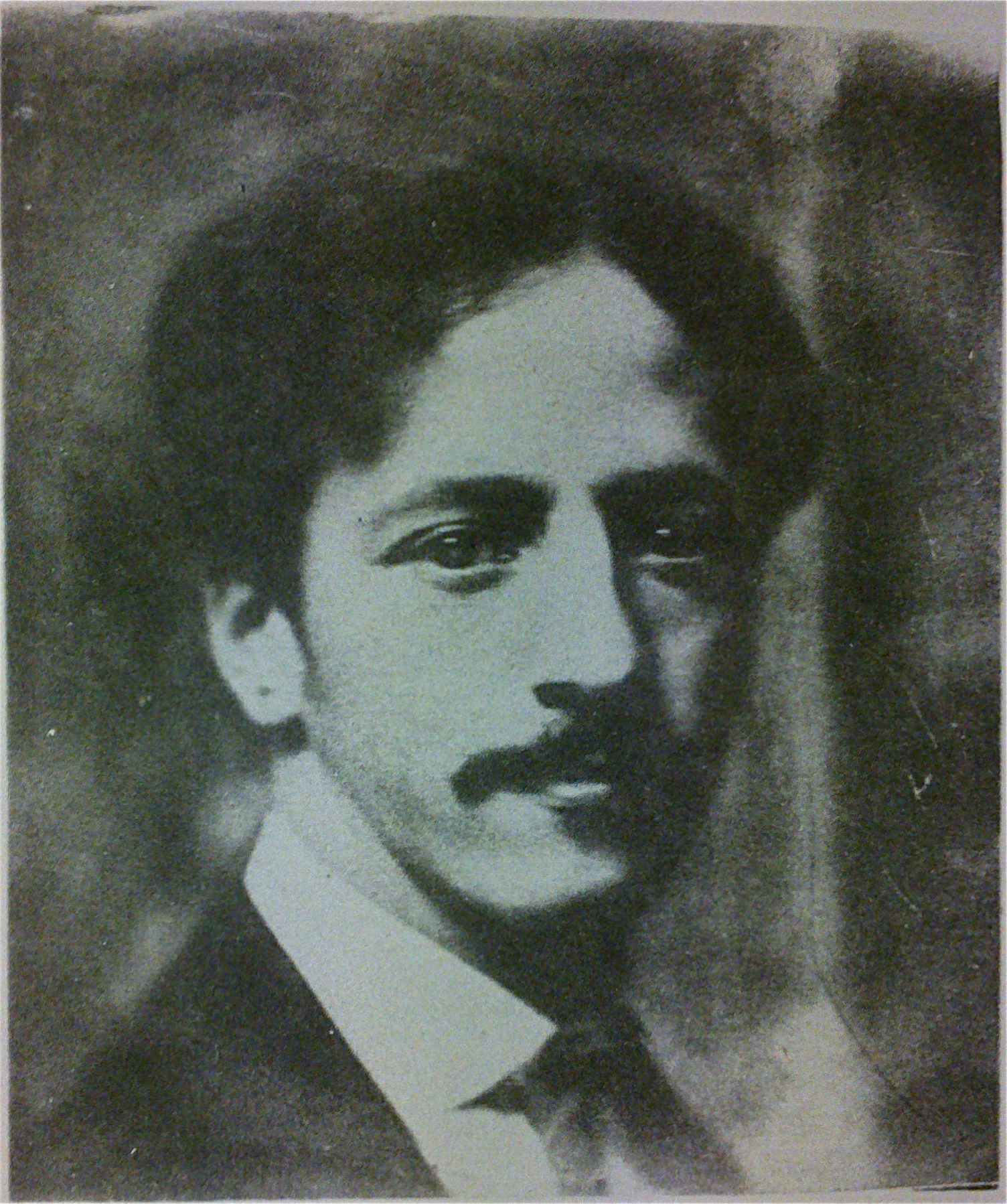
Gabriel Deluc

Gabriel Deluc (Saint-Jean-de-Luz, 1 October 1883 – Souain-Perthes-lès-Hurlus, 15 September 1916) was a French painter.

== Biography ==
Jean-Marie Gabriel Deluc was the son of Jean-Baptiste Deluc and Marie-Baptiste Davagnier. Born in the Atlantic region of the Low Pyrenees, since childhood manifested a strong talent for drawing and painting. In 1898, at the age of 15 years, he was noticed by the painter Léon Bonnat who entrusted him to the care of Philippe Jolyet, director of the Municipal School of Drawing of Bayonne. Two years later the young Deluc began to study in Bonnat's studio in Paris and, in 1903, he was finally admitted as a student at the École des Beaux-Arts.

From 1904 to 1912 Deluc lived in La Ruche, the famous citadel of artists, in the 15th arrondissement. His standard of living was poor, but Deluc still frequented artists who would later become important in the history of art, and among them in particular some originating from the Russian Empire, such as: Ossip Zadkine, Marc Chagall, and especially Alexander Altmann, of whom he became a friend and stayed with him in the Basque Country during some summers. The sculptor Charles-Arthur Müller, who came from Lorraine and who was also a pensioner of La Ruche, Deluc made a bust of him.

His first appearance as a painter took place in 1906 at the "Salon des artistes français" and earned him an honorable mention for his painting "Intimité". He was also awarded an encouragement prize of 500 francs. In the years that followed, Deluc exhibited regularly at the Salon and then at the "Salon des Indépendants".

In 1908 he donated a large decorative canvas to his hometown, The Shepherd of Goats (Le Chevrier), and two years later he presented another large work at the Salon of French Artists: The Dance (or The Dance in the Sacred Wood). This canvas was purchased by the patron Edmond de Rothschild who, in turn, made it a gift to the city of Bayonne.

In 1912, he exhibited at the Casino or Saint-Jean-de-Luz and in 1913 presented most of his work at the Devambez Gallery. At the same time he exhibited at the Salon two portraits: Portrait de M.lle H.C. and Portrait de M.me V.. The first of these portraits earned him a silver medal and a special prize of 1,000 francs.

On 3 September 1913 Deluc married Thérèse Mahé, in Paris, in the town hall of the XVI arrondissement. The following year he exhibited again at the Salon two large paintings, Spring and the Portrait of Madame G.D.. But in the meantime war had broken out and Deluc was enlisted in the French army, initially as a nurse. In 1915, however, he was sent to the front in the area of operations, where he was promoted to sergeant on 5 March 1916, and then, after only three months, sub-lieutenant.

Gabriel Deluc fell during a reconnaissance, near Souain-Perthes-lès-Hurlus, on 15 September 1916. He was 33 years old.

His latest works are therefore sketches taken live in the trenches and sometimes during offensives.

Maurice Ravel dedicated to him the Forlane, third piece of the suite for piano Le Tombeau de Couperin.

Deluc was the youngest artist belonging to the "School of Bayonne".

== Works ==
A large part of Gabriel Deluc's works are still untraceable, but there are several postcards of paintings exhibited by him at the "Salon des artistes français". The São Paulo Museum of Art in Brazil erroneously presents a painting by Deluc dated 1917.

=== Public works ===
- Bayonne, Museo Bonnat-Helleu: Portrait de Charles Deluc, 1904, olio su tela, 32.5 cm × 40.5 cm
- Bayonne, Museo Bonnat-Helleu: Intimité, 1906, olio su tela, 135 cm × 230 cm
- Saint-Jean-de-Luz, municipio: Le Chevrier, 1908, olio su tela, 143 cm × 322 cm
- Bayonne, Museo Bonnat-Helleu: La Danse, 1910, olio su tela, 192 cm × 250 cm
- Bayonne, Museo Bonnat-Helleu: Le Lac, 1912, olio su tela, 130 cm × 160 cm
- Parigi, Musée d'Orsay: Jeunesse, 1913, olio su tela, 155 cm × 302 cm
- Montfort-l'Amaury, Le Belvédère, casa-museo di Maurice Ravel: Daphnis et Chloé, 1913, olio su cartone, 33 cm × 44 cm
- Melun, Prefettura: Le Pont de Socoa, 1914, olio su tela, 100 cm × 130 cm
- Bayonne, Museo basco e della storia di Bayonne: Portrait de Madame Garrabé, non datato, olio su tela, 46 cm × 55 cm

== Images ==
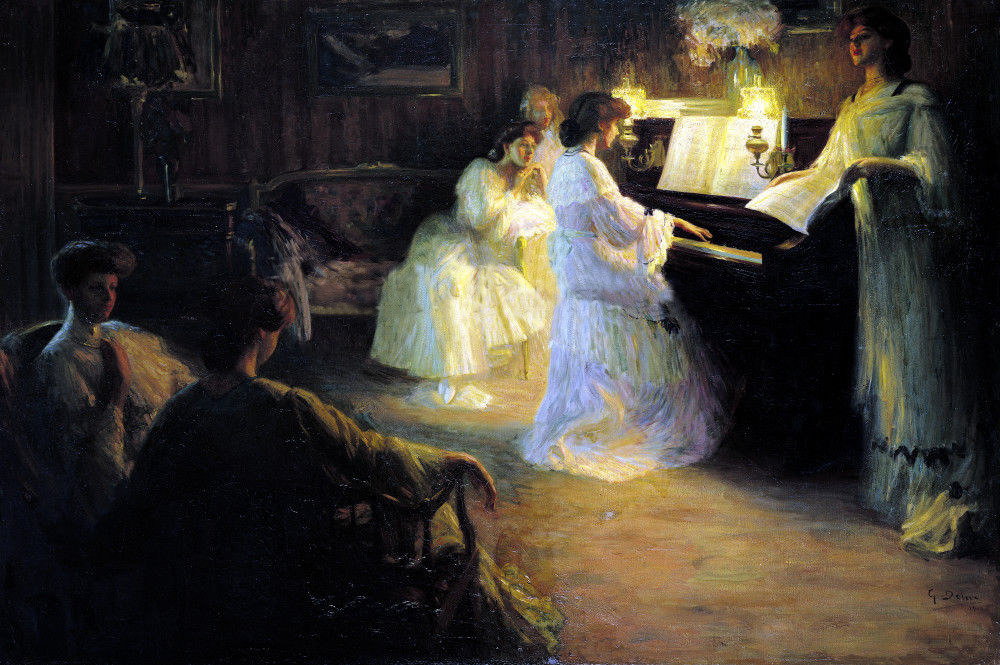
Intimità

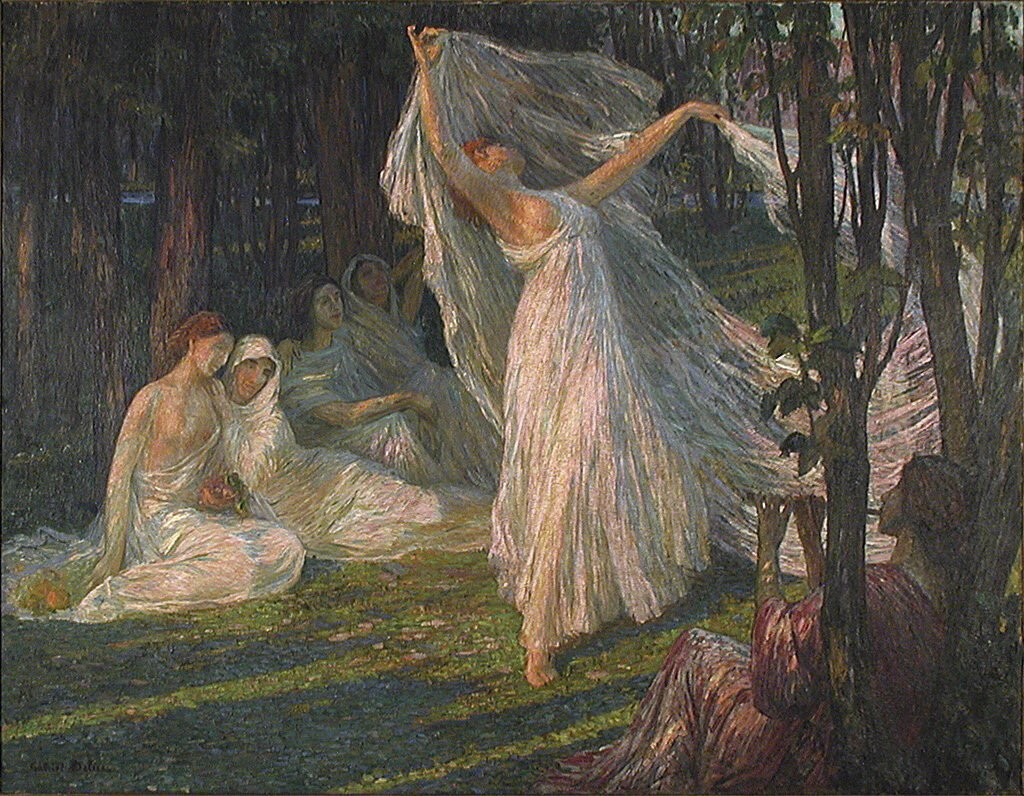
La danza nel bosco sacro

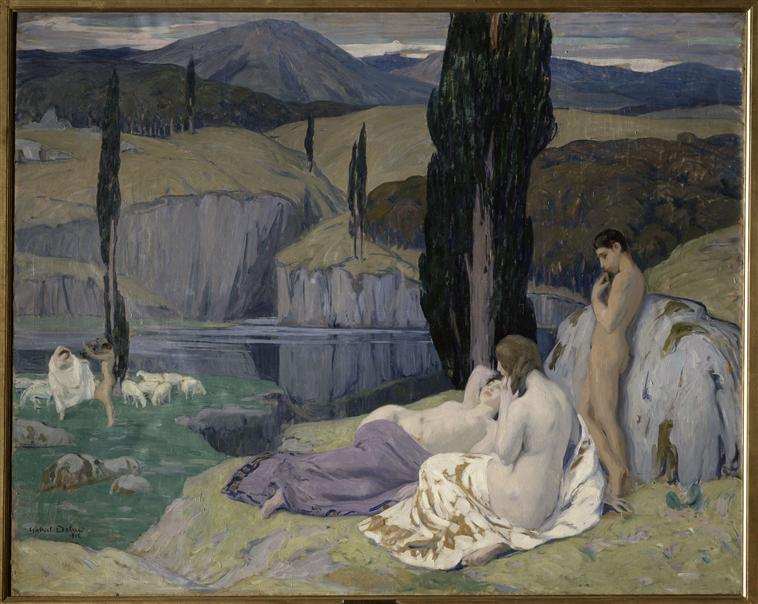
Il Lago

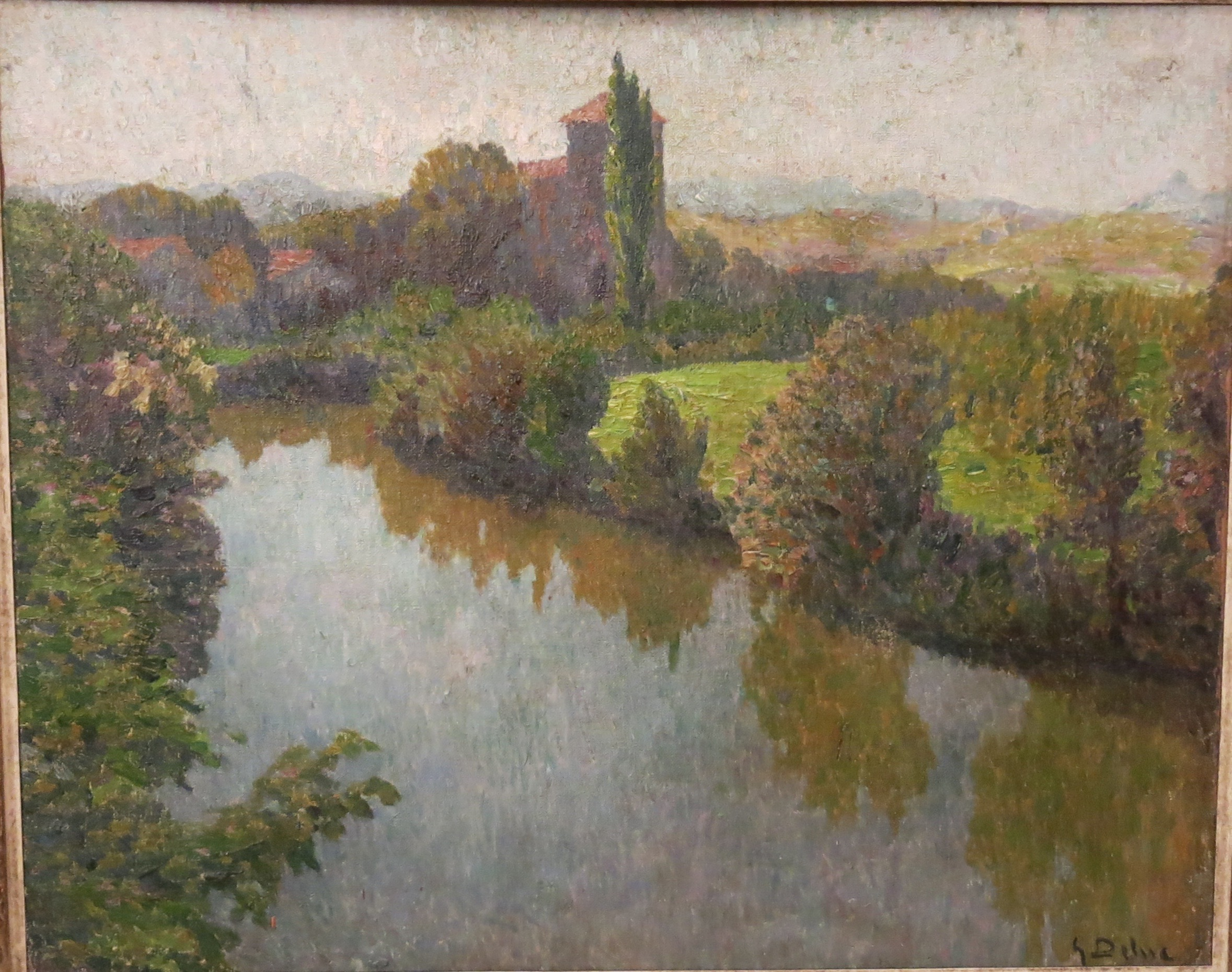
St Pée sur Nivelle

== Exhibitions ==
- "Exposition Gabriel Deluc," Devambez Gallery, boulevard Malesherbes, April 16–30, 1913 (catalog text by Gabriel Mourey).
- "Retrospective of Gabriel Deluc," Ducontenia Museum in Saint-Jean-de-Luz, July 28, 1934.
- "Gabriel Deluc, peintre luzien et héros de la Grande Guerre," Musée de Guéthary, July 4 to September 3, 2016.
- "Autour de Gabriel Deluc, peintre basque (1883-1916)", at the Villa Ducontenia and Rotunda de "La Pergola" in Saint-Jean-de-Luz, from July 1 to August 20, 2017.

== See also ==
- Basque Country
- La Ruche
- World War I

== Bibliography ==
- Dictionnaire Bénézit, tomo 4, p. 423, 1999
- Tombes basques et béarnaises 1914-1918, Stamperia Garet-Haristoy, Pau, 347 p.
- Henri Jean-Pierre, "Gabriel Deluc, peintre et soldat", Bollettino della "Société des Sciences, Lettres et Arts de Bayonne", n.37 del 1974, p. 209-226.
- Séverine Berger, Le Pays basque vu par les peintres 1900-1950, Ediz. Atlantica, Anglet, 2001.
- Gilbert Desport, Répertoire des peintres et sculpteurs du Pays basque, Ediz. Atlantica, Anglet, 2002.
- Étienne Rousseau-Plotto, Ravel, portraits basques, Ediz. Séguier, Anglet, 2004, 308 p., e Nuove edizioni Atlantica, Biarritz, 242 pag. 2016. - ISBN 978-2-840493600
- Alexandre Hurel et Michel de Jaureguiberry, Un siècle de peinture au Pays basque, 1850-1950. Ediz. Pimientos, Urrugne, 204 p.
- Michel de Jaureguiberry, La peinture basque. Ediz. Pimientos, Urrugne, 2009, 204 p.
- Étienne Rousseau-Plotto, Portrait de Gabriel Deluc par Henri Zo (1913), Bollettino del Museo basco, nº 180, 2013, p. 22-24.
- (EN) « DELUC, Gabriel (1883 - 1916), Painter », dal Dictionnaire Bénézit, vedi on line - ISBN 9780199899913
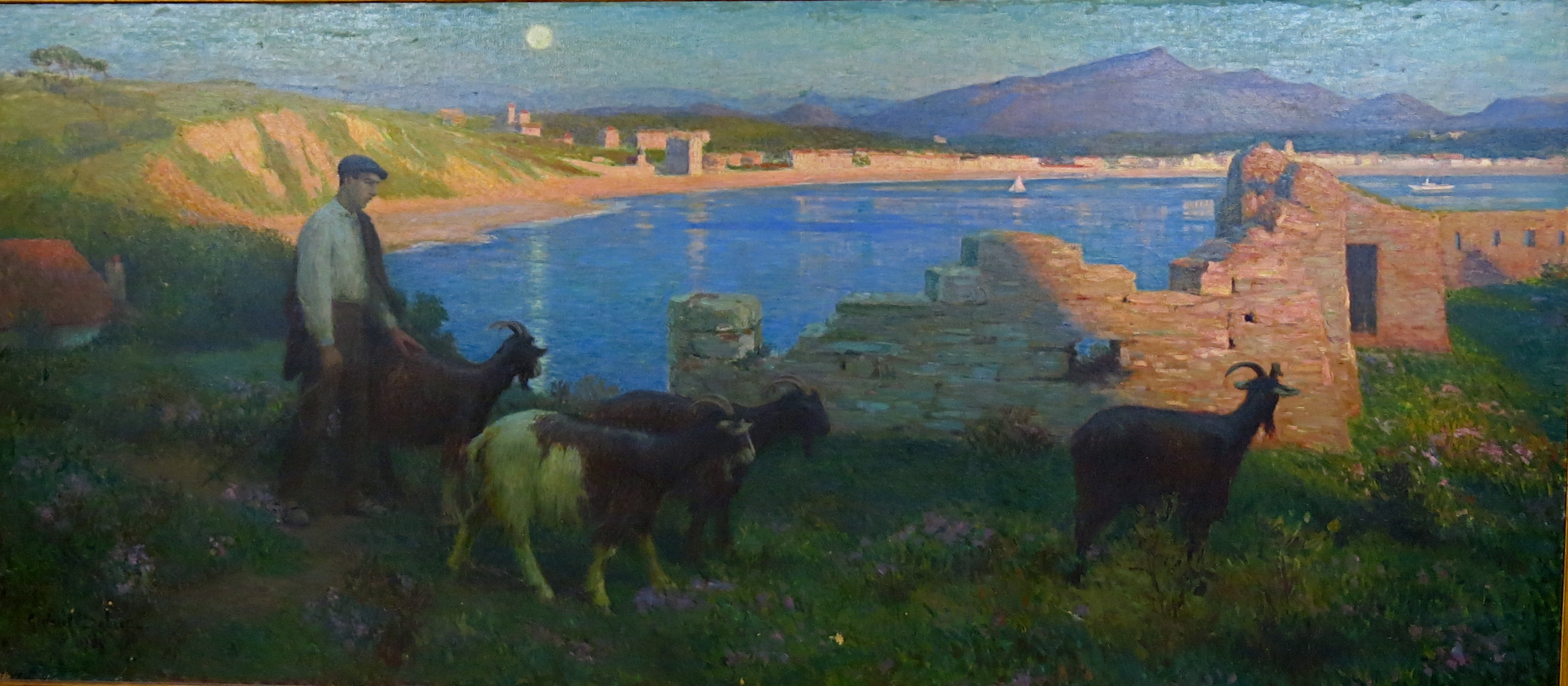
Il guardiano di capre

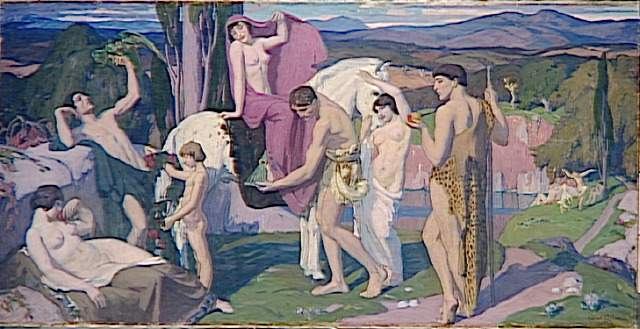
Giovinezza

== Other projects ==
- Wikimedia Commons contiene immagini o altri file su Gabriel Deluc
