= Manfred Bukofzer =

German-born American musicologist (1910–1955)

- Born: 27 March 1910; Oldenburg, German Empire
- Died: 17 December 1955 (aged 45); Berkeley, California, US

Academic background
- Education: Heidelberg University

Manfred Fritz Bukofzer (27 March 1910 – 7 December 1955) was a German-born American musicologist.

== Life and career ==
He studied at Heidelberg University and the Stern conservatory in Berlin, but left Germany in 1933 for Switzerland, where he obtained a doctorate from the University of Basel in 1936. In 1939 he moved to the United States where he remained, becoming a U.S. citizen. He taught at the University of California, Berkeley from 1941 until his premature death from multiple myeloma.

Bukofzer is best known as a historian of early music, particularly of the Baroque era. His book Music in the Baroque Era is still one of the standard reference works on the topic, although some modern historians assert that it has a Germanic bias – for example, in minimizing the importance of opera (Italian by origin) during the development of musical style in the 17th century.

In addition to Baroque music, he was a specialist in English music and music theory of the 14th through 16th centuries. His other scholarly interests included jazz and ethnomusicology. Furthermore, during his time at Berkeley, Bukofzer conducted several successful operas, including The Beggar's Opera, Dido and Aeneas, and Village Barber.

Among his influential students was Leonard Ratner. He was married to Ilse Kämmerer.

== Selected bibliography ==
- Bukofzer, Manfred (1936). "Über Leben und Werke von Dunstable" [On the Life and Works of Dunstable]. Acta Musicologica (in German). 8 (3/4): 102–119. doi:10.2307/932037. JSTOR 932037.
- Bukofzer, Manfred R. (1947). Music in the Baroque Era: From Monteverdi to Bach. New York: W. W. Norton & Company. OCLC 318558558.
- Bukofzer, Manfred R. (1950). Studies in Medieval and Renaissance Music. New York: W. W. Norton & Company. ISBN 9780393002416. OCLC 599423 – via Internet Archive.
- Bukofzer, Manfred (1954). "John Dunstable: A Quincentenary Report". The Musical Quarterly. 40 (1): 29–49. doi:10.1093/mq/XL.1.29. JSTOR 739701.
