= Schloss Wasserhof =

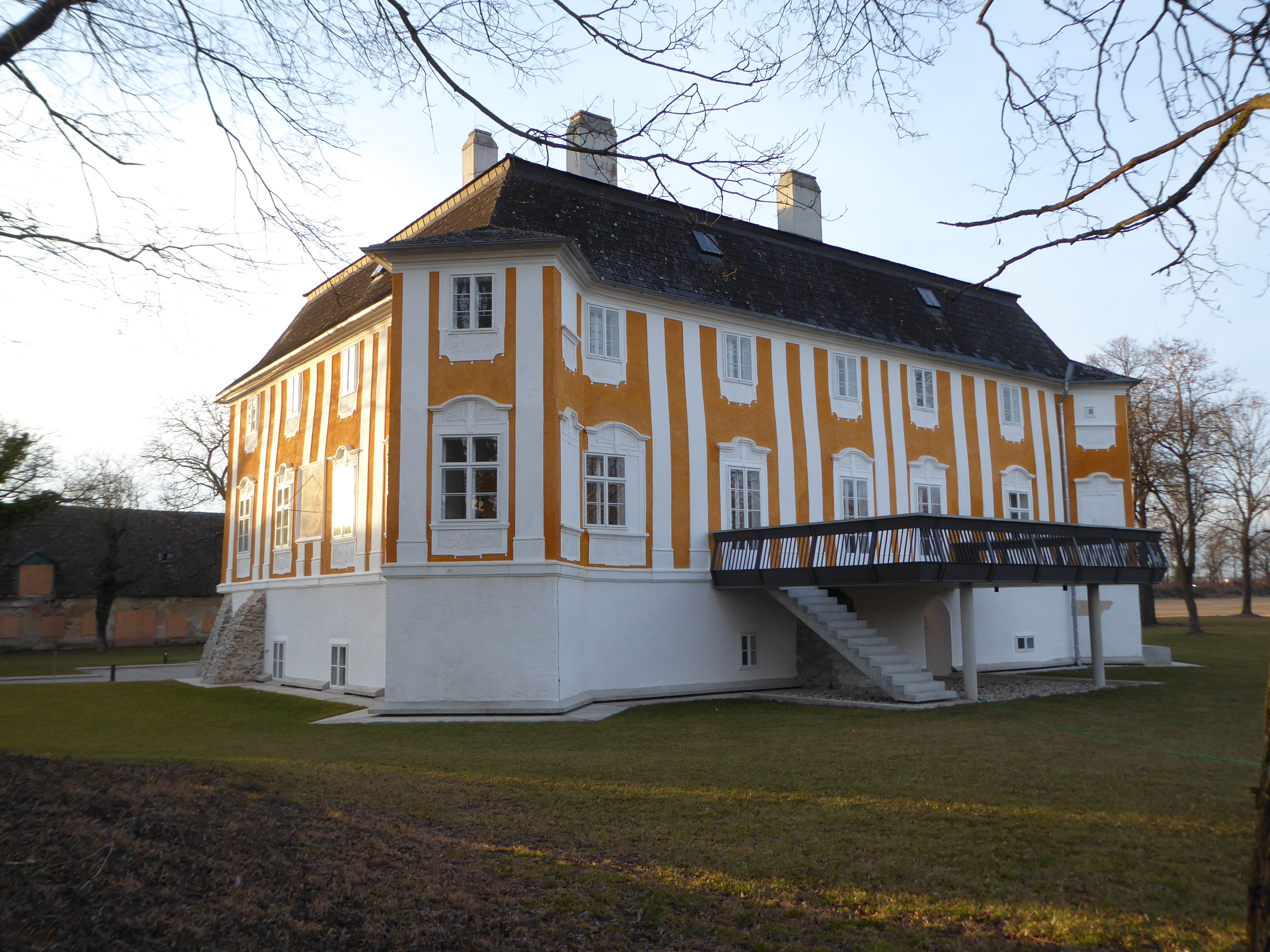
- The building in 2017
- Interactive map of the Schloss Wasserhof area

General information
- Location: Gneixendorf, Austria
- Coordinates: 48°26′28.56″N 15°37′20.53″E

Schloss Wasserhof is a privately owned building in Gneixendorf, near Krems an der Donau in Lower Austria. It is known particularly as the property in the early 19th century of Nikolaus Johann van Beethoven, brother of Ludwig van Beethoven; the composer stayed here at one time.

== History ==
The earliest mention of the Gneixendorf estate is in 1141, when Otto von Machland, having no heirs, bequeathed the estate to Baumgartenberg Abbey. The present building dates from around 1550.

=== Nikolaus Johann van Beethoven ===
In 1819 Nikolaus Johann van Beethoven acquired the property.

In autumn 1826, his brother Ludwig van Beethoven visited him. During his stay the composer wrote the finale to his String Quartet Op. 130, the last music he completed. It was a replacement, composed at the suggestion of his publisher, of the Große Fuge, the original finale. He began the piece in September, and sent the manuscript to his publisher on 22 November 1826; he left Gneixendorf soon afterwards.

=== 21st century ===
In recent years the building has been restored by the present owner, the architect Ernst Linsberger.
