= Furlana =

Italian folk dance

The furlana (also spelled furlane, forlane, friulana, forlana) is an Italian folk dance from the Italian region of Friuli-Venezia Giulia. In Friulian, furlane means Friulian, in this case Friulian Dance. In Friuli there has been a Slav minority since the Slavic settlement of the Eastern Alps, and the furlana may well have originated as a Slavonic dance. It dates at least to 1583, when a "ballo furlano" called L'arboscello was published in Pierre Phalèse the Younger’s Chorearum molliorum collectanea and in Jakob Paix’s organ tablature book, though its chief popularity extended from the late 1690s to about 1750. It is particularly associated with Venice because, at the time of its popularity, Friuli was a part of the Republic of Venice.

The furlana is a fast dance, in duple-time 6/8, though one exceptional example proves to be in quintuple meter, underlining the Slavonic associations also suggested by its title, Polesana, which in Italian can mean "a woman from Pola" (a city in Istria, neighbouring Friuli and a part of Italy until 1947), or may be from the Croatian word "polesa", meaning "rural", or "from the back woods". Originally, the furlana was a courtship dance, performed by a couple. It was introduced to France by André Campra in 1697 (in L'Europe galante) and 1699 (in Le carnaval de Venise, in which the first of two furlanas serves as a dance entry for a troupe of Slavs, Armenians, and Gypsies), and it quickly became a popular theatre and social dance there.

Pietro Paolo Melii (active first quarter of the 17th century) included a "Furlain volta alla Francese detta la Schapigliata" in his Intavolatura di Liuto attiorbato, e di Tiorba. Libro Quinto (Venice, 1620). The piece is written almost entirely in running eighths, and, as so many of Melii's pieces, makes considerable use of syncopation. Giovanni Battista Vitali, a 17th-century composer, included a Furlana in 6/8 time in his "Partite sopra diverse Sonate per il Violino." François Couperin closed the fourth of his Concerts royaux with a forlane. Johann Sebastian Bach incorporated a forlane in his first orchestral suite. Maurice Ravel recalled the baroque usage in his piano suite Le Tombeau de Couperin, though his Forlane is a rather plaintive piece in moderate time. Another forlane occurs at the end of Ernest Chausson's piano suite Quelques Danses (Some Dances)—this one far livelier and featuring an alternation between triple and sextuple rhythms. The fourth movement of Gerald Finzi's Five Bagatelles (Op. 23) is a forlana as is the fourth movement of Richard Harvey's Concerto Antico for guitar and orchestra.
