= Pasdeloup Orchestra =

Symphony orchestra in France

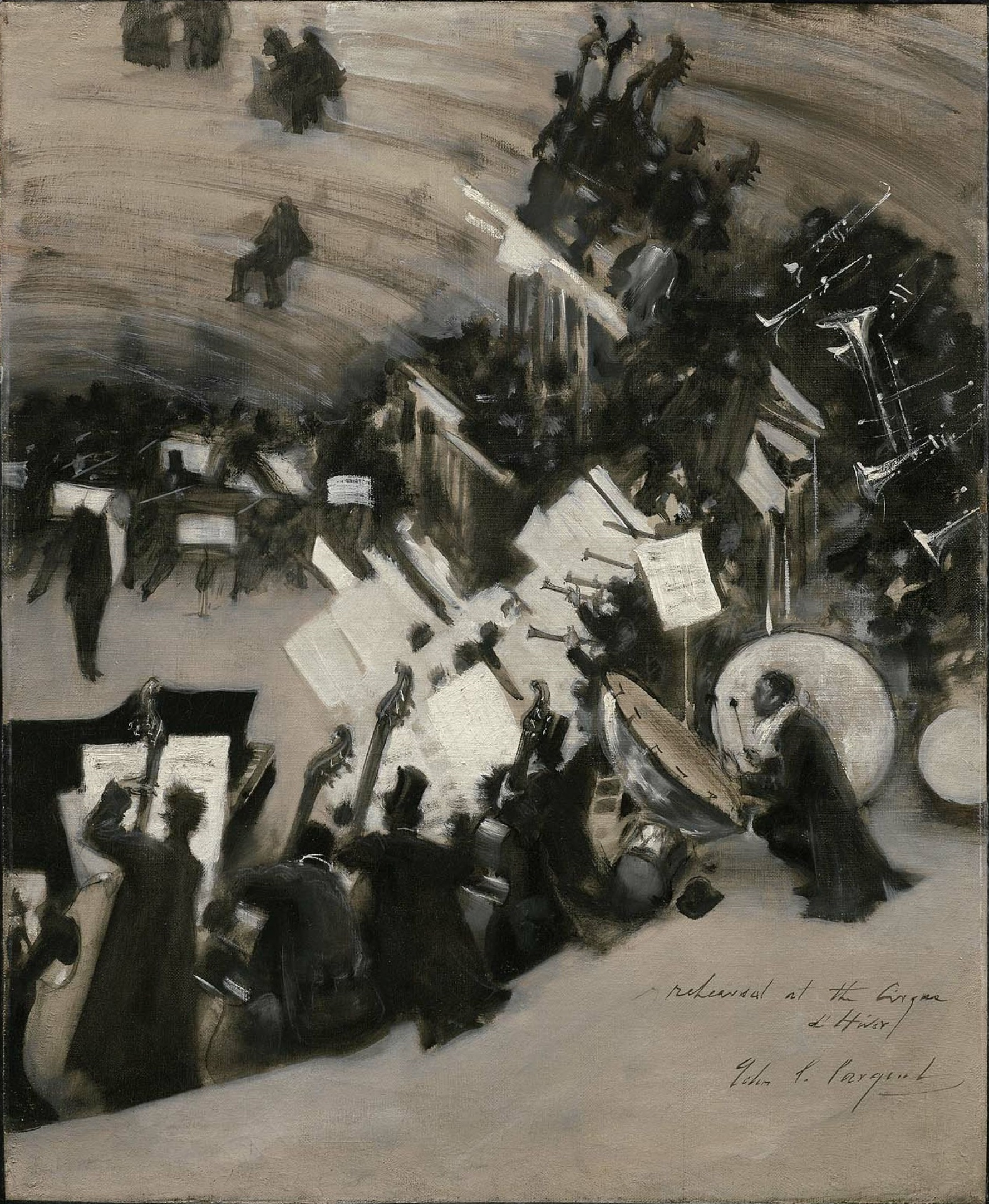
Rehearsal of the Pasdeloup Orchestra at the Cirque d'Hiver by John Singer Sargent, Museum of Fine Arts, Boston.

The Pasdeloup Orchestra (also referred to as Orchestre des Concerts Pasdeloup) is a symphony orchestra in France.

== History ==
Founded in 1861 by Jules Pasdeloup with the name Concerts Populaires, it is the oldest orchestra founded as a private association still in existence in Paris. Aimed at an audience hitherto absent from evening concerts, the orchestra presented cheap Sunday concerts in the vast rotonda of the Cirque d'hiver in Paris. The opening concert (27 October 1861), with an orchestra of 80 musicians, consisted of the following programme:

- Overture to Oberon by Carl Maria von Weber
- Beethoven’s Pastoral Symphony
- Mendelssohn's Violin Concerto with Jean Alard
- the Emperor's Hymn by Joseph Haydn.

Rehearsals took place on Tuesday and Thursday at the Conservatoire and on Saturday at the Cirque d'hiver (musicians were paid 15 francs per concert with rehearsals). The first leader was Lancien, of the orchestra of the Paris Opéra. Early concerts included music by Berlioz and Wagner.

The enterprise was a great success and the Concerts Populaires became a genuine institution, playing a lead role in forming a new audience through making known the Austro-German repertoire and also by influencing the creation of French symphonic works.

Pasdeloup continued his activity until 1884 and tried in vain to restart in 1886 by mounting a festival devoted to César Franck (which was a success).

The orchestra started up again in 1919, under the guidance of Serge Sandberg, with the title Orchestre Pasdeloup.

Since 2015, the main concert hall of the Philharmonie de Paris has been the principal concert venue for the orchestra.

== Principal conductors ==
- Jules Pasdeloup (1861–1887)
- Rhené-Baton (1919–1933)
- Albert Wolff (1925–1928) and (1934–1970)
- Désiré-Émile Inghelbrecht (1928–1932)
- Gérard Devos (1970–1990)

André Caplet was the deputy chief conductor from 1922 to 1925. Since 1990, the orchestra has not had a permanent principal conductor and has been run by a committee; from 2000 this has been chaired by the violinist Marianne Rivière. Patrice Fontanarosa is the current artistic advisor for the orchestra, while Jean-Christophe Keck oversees the direction of the Offenbach concerts. Conductor Wolfgang Doerner has regularly directed the orchestra each season since 1987.

== Premieres ==
- Georges Bizet: Symphony "Roma", 1869 (3 movements only) – L'Arlésienne Suites No 1 and 2, 1872 – Patrie overture, 1874
- Camille Saint-Saëns: Le Rouet d'Omphale, 1872
- Édouard Lalo: Symphonie espagnole, 1875 – Le Roi d'Ys, overture, 1876
- Henri Duparc : Léonore, 1877
- Louis Aubert: Habanera, 1919
- Maurice Ravel: Alborada del gracioso, 1919 and Le tombeau de Couperin, 1929
- Lili Boulanger: D'un matin de printemps and D'un soir triste, 1920
- Darius Milhaud: Les Choéphores, concert version, 1927 and Concerto for piano No. 1, 1931
- Georges Migot: Symphony No. 1, 1922 – La Jungle, 1932
- Pierre Capdevielle: Incantation pour la mort d'un Jeune Spartiate, 1933
- Raymond Loucheur: Symphony No. 1, 1935
- Albert Roussel: Symphony No. 2, 1922; Symphony No. 4, 1935
- Marcel Landowski: Rythmes du monde, 1941; Concerto for piano No. 1, 1942; Symphony No. 1, 1949; Les Noces de la Nuit, 1962
- Jean Martinon: Symphony No. 2, 1945
- Henri Tomasi: Chant pour le Viêt-Nam, 1969
- Henri Sauguet: Symphony No. 4, 1971
- Jacques Charpentier: Symphony No. 5, 1977

== Discography ==
- Berlioz: La Damnation de Faust, Op. 24 (slightly abridged) with Marguerite Mireille Berthon, Jose de Trevi, Charles Panzéra, Louis Morturier, conducted by Piero Coppola
- Borodin: In the Steppes of Central Asia, Désiré-Émile Inghelbrecht
- Charpentier: La Vie du Poète (conducted by the composer)
- Debussy: La Damoiselle élue with Odette Ricquier, Jeanne Guyla, Piero Coppola; Petite Suite, Désiré-Émile Inghelbrecht
- Dukas: L'apprenti sorcier, Désiré-Émile Inghelbrecht
- Franck: Symphony, Rhené-Baton
- Mozart: Piano Concerto No. 26 in D major, K. 537 Magda Tagliaferro, conducted by Reynaldo Hahn
- Offenbach: Le Financier et le Savetier, conducted by Jean-Christophe Keck
- Richard Strauss: Dance of the Seven Veils, Piero Coppola
