= Variations sur le nom de Marguerite Long =

1920 French orchestral suite

- Orchestral suite by eight French composers
- Composed: 1920
- Dedication: Marguerite Long
- Performed: 4 June 1956: Paris

Variations sur le nom de Marguerite Long (Variations on the name Marguerite Long) is a collaborative orchestral suite written by eight French composers in 1956, in honour of the pianist Marguerite Long.

It was first performed on 4 June 1956 by the Orchestre National de France under Charles Munch in a National Jubilee Concert organized by the French government in Long's honour, staged at the Grand Amphitheatre of the Sorbonne. "All of Paris" gathered at the venue where Long herself played Fauré's Ballade.

Three of the composers were members of Les Six: Georges Auric, Darius Milhaud and Francis Poulenc. The other five were Henri Dutilleux, Jean Françaix, Daniel Lesur, Jean Rivier and Henri Sauguet.

In truth, only one of the movements was in the form of variations. Sauguet's Variations en forme de Berceuse pour Marguerite Long was based on the letters EAGG, which come from her name, although not in the order in which they occur there.

Poulenc's Bucolique has become well known and has been recorded several times. The remainder of the suite is little known.

== Structure ==
The suite is structured as follows:

- Jean Françaix: Hymne solennel
- Henri Sauguet: Variations en forme de Berceuse pour Marguerite Long
- Darius Milhaud: La Couronne de Marguerites ("The Crown of Daisies"), Valse en forme de rondo, Op. 353
- Jean Rivier: Nocturne
- Henri Dutilleux: Sérénades
- Daniel Lesur: Intermezzo
- Francis Poulenc: Bucolique, FP 160
- Georges Auric: ML (Allegro: Finale)

== Notes ==
- Rollo Myers, "Notes from Abroad", The Musical Times, July 1956, p. 380
