= Nikolaus Johann van Beethoven =

Brother of Ludwig van Beethoven

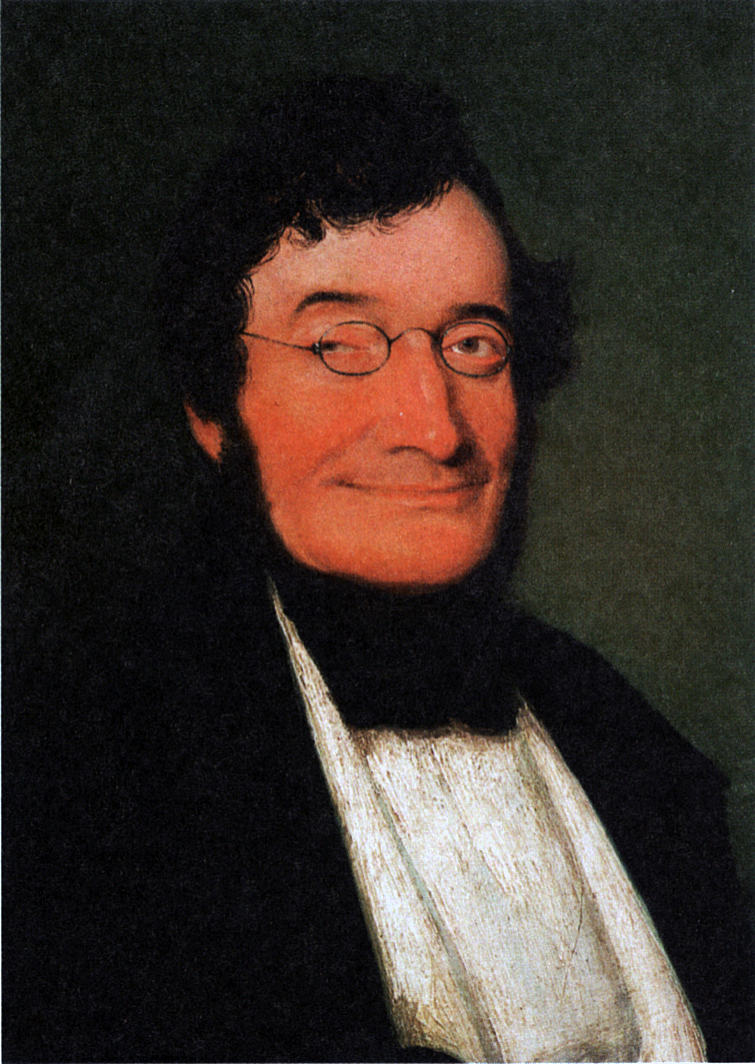
Nikolaus Johann van Beethoven, by L. Gross (1841)

Nikolaus Johann van Beethoven (2 October 1776 – 12 January 1848) was a German pharmacist and landowner. He was a younger brother of the composer Ludwig van Beethoven.

== Life ==
He was born in Bonn, the youngest son of Johann van Beethoven and his wife Maria Magdalena Keverich. He trained to be a pharmacist; he moved in 1795 to Vienna, where his brothers Ludwig and Kaspar lived. He wished to be known as Johann, in memory of their late father. He worked in Vienna as a pharmacist's assistant, and in 1808 he opened a pharmacy in Linz.

In 1809, Napoleon invaded Austria, establishing a base camp in Linz for wounded soldiers. Johann supplied the French army with their medical needs; this enabled Johann to prosper.

In 1812 Johann announced that he intended to marry Thérèse Obermeyer, his housekeeper. Ludwig van Beethoven, returning home from a stay at the spa resort of Teplice, visited his brother in Linz. He regarded the proposed marriage as unsuitable, and tried to dissuade him. He also appealed to the local authority. He was not successful; Johann married Thérèse Obermeyer (1787–1828) on 8 November 1812. They had no children.

Johann bought Schloss Wasserhof, an estate in Gneixendorf, in 1819. After the purchase, he signed a letter to Ludwig "From your brother Johann, landowner". Ludwig signed his reply, "From your brother Ludwig, brain owner".

In autumn 1826, the composer visited Johann in Gneixendorf. During his stay he wrote the finale to his String Quartet Op. 130, the last music he completed. It was a replacement, composed at the suggestion of his publisher, of the Große Fuge, the original finale. He began the piece in September, and sent the manuscript to his publisher on 22 November 1826.

== Personal impressions ==
Gerhard von Breuning, son of the composer's friend Stephan von Breuning, gave this description of Johann to Alexander Wheelock Thayer: "His frame was not actually large, but was much larger than Ludwig's. His nose was large and rather long; his eyes were not evenly set, so that one got the impression he had a cast in one eye.... In his clothing he played the well-to-do dandy, but that did not suit his bony, angular figure. He bore no resemblance whatever to his brother Ludwig."

Count Moritz Lichnowsky, in the winter of 1822/23, said of Johann (during a conversation with Ludwig van Beethoven and recorded in the composer's conversation books): "Everyone makes a fool of him; we call him simply 'The Chevalier'. — Everybody says his only merit is that he bears your name."
