= La Ruche, Fontvieille =

Building in Fontvieille, Monaco

Coordinates: 43.72725°N 7.41292°E

La Ruche, Fontvieille is an industrial building in the Principality of Monaco.

== History ==
=== Erection and inauguration ===
It was built by Monaco's Public Works Office.

La Ruche was inaugurated in 2003, in the presence of various public and industrial figures as well as diplomatic and consular representatives.

=== 2004 incident ===
On May 31, 2004, La Ruche and the neighboring Stade Louis II were damaged by an apparently deliberate explosion. No injuries occurred and the responsibility remained unclear. The damage, while relatively extensive to portions of the fabric of the buildings, was verified as not having affected the buildings' respective structures.

On June 1, the Government of Monaco announced that it would assume responsibility for repairs to the damage caused by the explosion, without preempting the results of expert investigations, which continued. This incident constituted a rare exception to Monaco's long established reputation for safety and absence of violence.
