= Rhené-Baton =

French conductor and composer

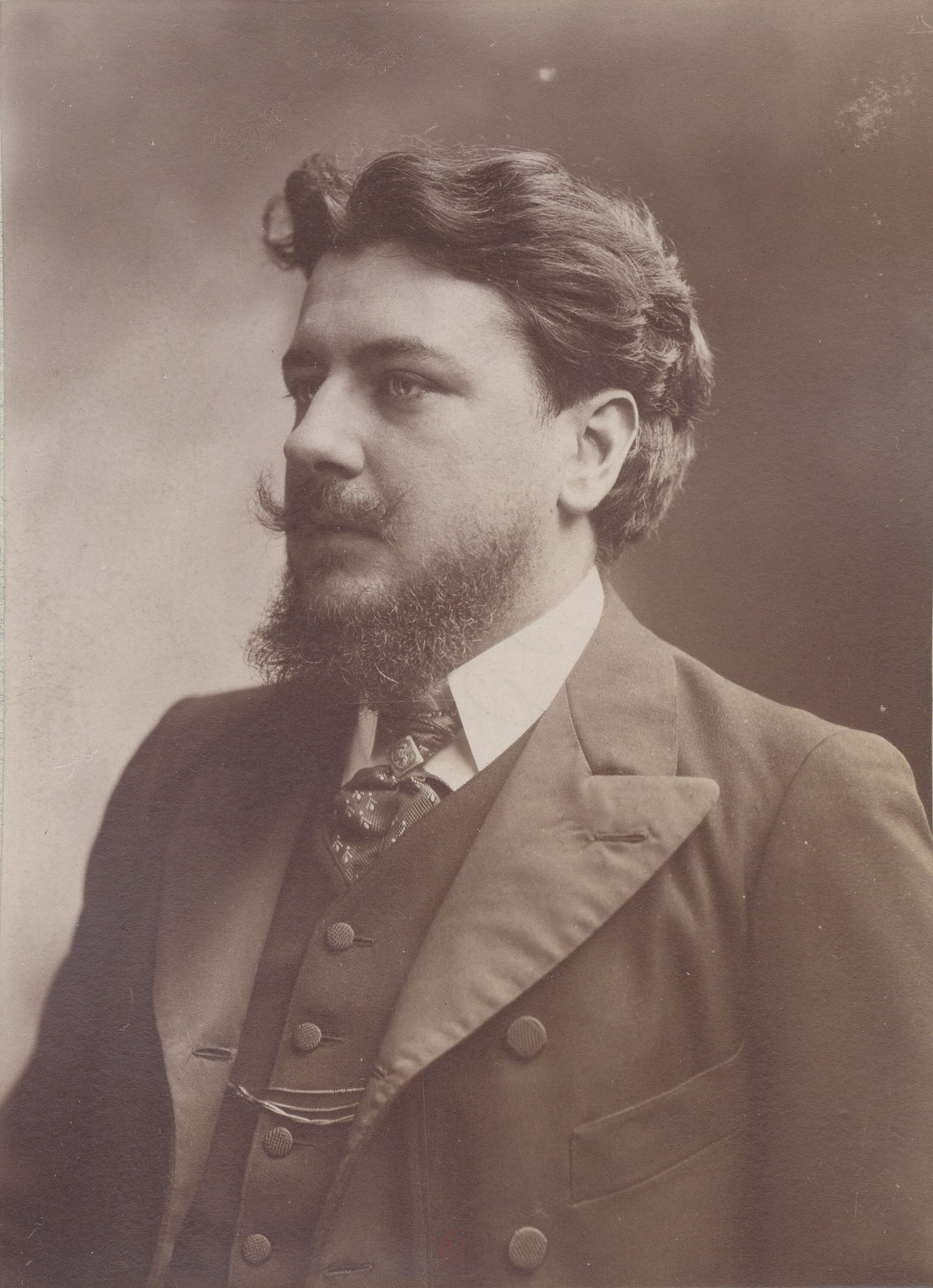
Rhené-Baton photographed by Nadar c.1910

René-Emmanuel Baton, known as Rhené-Baton (5 September 1879 – 23 September 1940), was a French conductor and composer. Though born in Courseulles-sur-Mer, Normandy, his family originated in Vitré in neighbouring Brittany. He returned to the region at the age of 19, and many of his compositions express his love of the area. He also had close relationships with composers of the Breton cultural renaissance, notably Guy Ropartz, Paul Le Flem, Paul Ladmirault and Louis Aubert. As a conductor he was notable for his attempts to expand appreciation of classical music.

== Conducting career ==
He studied piano at the Paris Conservatory and learned music theory under André Gedalge. He began his career as a chef de chant at the Opera-Comique in 1907. He was then appointed as musical director of various orchestral groups, notably the Society of Saint Cecilia in Bordeaux and Angers Société populaire (1910–1912).

In 1910 he was chosen to head the "Festival of French music" in Munich, Germany. Serge Diaghilev requested that he conduct the Ballets Russes in London and South America (1912–1913). During World War I he was the head of the Dutch Royal Opera (1916–18) and conducted the summer concerts of the Residentie Orchestra in the Kurhaus of Scheveningen (1914–19). Although his recordings are few, on 14, 17, and 18 October 1924 with the Pasdeloup Orchestra he committed to disc the first ever recording of Hector Berlioz's Symphonie fantastique.

Serge Sandberg entrusted him with the direction of the Pasdeloup concert (the French "Proms"), the mission of which was to democratise access to music, providing commentary and analysis prior to the performance of works. He organized this event until 1932 and continued to lead the orchestra until the end of his life. He died at Le Mans.

=== Premieres ===
He created the first performances of a number of notable musical works:

- Les Evocations by Albert Roussel (1912)
- Printemps by Claude Debussy (1913)
- Habanera by Louis Aubert (1919)
- Alborada del gracioso (1919) and Le tombeau de Couperin by Maurice Ravel
- Les Agrestides and the Organ Symphony by Georges Migot (1922)
- Requiem by Guy Ropartz (1939)

Arthur Honegger dedicated Le Chant de Nigamon (1918) to Rhené-Baton, as did Albert Roussel with his 2nd symphony (1923).

== Compositions ==
Rhené-Baton composed pieces for orchestra, chamber ensembles and a large number of piano works. His 6 Songs for Marycinthe were created at the request of Maurice Duhamel. Breton subjects appear frequently in his works, such as "Au pardon de Rumengol", "En Bretagne", "Vieille chapelle en Cornouaille". He also set to music the poems of Auguste Brizeux (Le Clocher) and Louis Tiercelin (Chansons bretonnes). Some of his works were influenced by the vogue for orientalism at the time. A founding member of the Association des Compositeurs Bretons in 1912, he composed many works using a Breton folk idiom.

In July 2019 Brilliant Classics released a double CD album dedicated to Rhené-Baton's chamber music for strings and piano, performed by the Wolferl Trio, which includes three premier recordings of the Violin Sonatas No. 1 and 2, the Suite ancienne, the Cello Sonata and the Piano Trio.

=== Works ===
==== Symphonic and Operatic ====
- Variations, for piano and orchestra on a theme in the aeolian mode (1904)
- Menuet pour Monsieur, frère du roi (1909)
- Poème élégiaque, for violon et orchestre (1924)
- Danses paysannes (1924)
- En vacances (1924)
- Pour les funérailles d'un marin breton (1925)
- Fantaisie orientale, for violin and orchestra (1926)
- Petite suite, for brass band (1932)
- several film scores, 1928–29

==== Chamber music ====
- Violin Sonata No. 1 (1921)
- Cello Sonata (1923)
- Piano Trio (1924)
- Poème élégiaque, for cello and piano (1924)
- Passacaille, Op. 35, for flute and piano (1924)
- Bourrée, Op. 42, for flute and piano (1926)
- Fantaisie orientale, for violin and piano (1926)
- Violin Sonata No. 2 (1927)
- Suite ancienne, for violin and piano (1933)

==== Piano ====
- Étude en La mineur (1901)
- Prélude en Ré mineur (1901)
- Sérénade fantastique (1901)
- Six Préludes (1901)
- Pour Yvonne Billot (1902)
- Album Rose (1902)
- En Bretagne, Op. 13 (suite de six pièces) (1909)
- Ballade en la bémol, Op. 22 (1921)
- Dans le style rococo, Op. 23 (1921)
- Au pardon de Rumengol, Op. 25 (1922)
- Danses à sept temps, Op. 30 (1923)
- Dans la Clairière, Op. 36 (1925)
- Cortège funèbre d'un Samouraï, Op. 37 (1925)
- Marche des Rois Mages, Op. 39 (1925)
- Danse de la Saint-Jean, Op. 40 (1926)
- Vieille chapelle en Cornouaille, Op. 41 (1926)
- 2me Ballade, Op. 43 (1926)
- Danse pour Anne de Bretagne, Op. 44 (1926)
- Valse romantique, Op. 45 (1927)
- River-side, Op. 49 (1928)
- Pour la jeunesse, Op. 51 (1929)
- Potiron, Op. 58 (1938)

==== Vocal and religious ====
- pieces for voice and piano
- Chansons pour Marycinthe, for orchestra (1931)
