= Leonard Ratner =

Leonard Gilbert Ratner
- Born: July 30, 1916; Minneapolis, Minnesota
- Died: September 2, 2011 (aged 95)
- Education: University of California at Berkeley
- Known for: Developer of the concept of topic theory (see music semiology)
- Awards: Guggenheim Fellowship, Fellow of the American Academy of Arts and Sciences
- Scientific career
- Fields: Musicology
- Institutions: Stanford University

Leonard Gilbert Ratner (July 30, 1916 – September 2, 2011) was an American musicologist and professor of musicology at Stanford University. He was a specialist in the style of the Classical period, and is best known as a developer of the concept of topic theory (see Music semiology).

== Biography ==
Ratner was born in Minneapolis, Minnesota. He studied the violin and viola, as well as composition with Frederick Jacobi, Arnold Schoenberg, Ernest Bloch, and Arthur Bliss. Under Manfred Bukofzer, he received a Ph.D. in musicology from the University of California at Berkeley, the first such degree to be given by that university.

== Career ==
In 1947, he joined the newly formed Department of Music at Stanford University, and continued there until his retirement in 1984, composing, teaching, and conducting research on music theory. He composed a chamber opera, The Necklace, and several chamber works. He taught composition and theory to advanced students and coached chamber music; he also taught elementary music appreciation courses for undergraduates, Stanford alumni, and the general public. He was awarded a Guggenheim Fellowship (1962) and elected as a Fellow of the American Academy of Arts and Sciences in 1998.

His research was devoted to emphasizing "sonata form's harmonic underpinnings as an antidote to the thematic perspective" and developing a theory of musical period and form.

== Publications ==
=== Books ===
- Music: The Listener's Art NY: McGraw-Hill. 1st ed. 1957; 2nd. ed 196; 3rd ed. 1977
- Harmony, Structure, and Style NY: McGraw-Hill, 1962
- Classic Music: Expression, Form, and Style NY: Schrimer, 1980
  - Review by Jane Stevens, Journal of Music Theory 27 (1983)
- The Musical Experience: Sound, Movement, and Arrival NY:Freeman, 1983
- Romantic Music: Sound, and Syntax NY: Schrimer, 1992
- the Beethoven String Quartets: Compositional Strategies and Rhetoric Stanford: Stanford Bookstore, 1995

=== Academic journal articles ===
- "Harmonic aspects of Classic Form" Journal of the American Musicological Society 2 (3), Autumn, 1949 p.159-68
- "Eighteenth-Century Theories of Musical Period Structure" Musical Quarterly 42(4) Oct. 1956 p 439–454
- "On the nature and value of theoretical training" ("A Forum: Music theory for the Layman") Journal of Music Theory 3 (1959) 58–69
- "Approaches to Musical Historiography of the Eighteenth Century" Current Musicology 9 (1969) 154–57
- "Key Definition: A structural problem in Beethoven's Music" Journal of the American Musicological Society, 23(3) Autumn, 1970 472–83
- "Texture: A Rhetorical element in Beethoven's Quartets" Israel Studies in Musicology 2 (1980) p. 51-62
- "Topical content in Mozart's Keyboard Sonatas" Early Music' 19 (4) (1991) 615–19
- "'Mozart's Parting Gifts" Journal of Musicology 18(1) Winter, 2001, 189–211

=== Other ===
- "Development" and "Sonata Form" in Harvard Dictionary of Music, 2nd ed., 1969.
- "Koch, Heinrich Cristoph" "Period" and "Riepel, Joseph" in New Grove Dictionary of Music and Musicians 1980
