= Joseph de Marliave =

French musicologist

- Born: 16 November 1873
- Died: 24 August 1914 (aged 40)
- Occupation: Musicologist
- Notable work: Les Quatuors de Beethoven
- Spouse: Marguerite Long

Joseph de Marliave (16 November 1873 – 24 August 1914) was a French musicologist. He is best known for his book on Beethoven's string quartets, which was the most widely read and quoted book on the subject prior to Joseph Kerman's 1966 book The Beethoven Quartets.

In addition to his work on Beethoven, he published numerous essays on other composers. Some of his book on Beethoven was a translation and paraphrase of the 1885 book in German by Theodor Helm.

Marliave was a close friend of Gabriel Fauré, who wrote the preface to the original French edition of the book on the Beethoven quartets.

Marliave was also a captain in the French army, and he was killed in action in August 1914, shortly after the outbreak of the World War I. Maurice Ravel memorialized him in his Le tombeau de Couperin, dedicating the closing Toccata to him (the sixth part of the piano version, but absent in the orchestral arrangement).

Marliave was the husband of the famous French pianist Marguerite Long (1874–1966).

== Works ==
- Études musicales (1917)
- Les Quatuors de Beethoven (1925, posthume)
