= Concerts royaux (Couperin) =

Chamber music suites by François Couperin

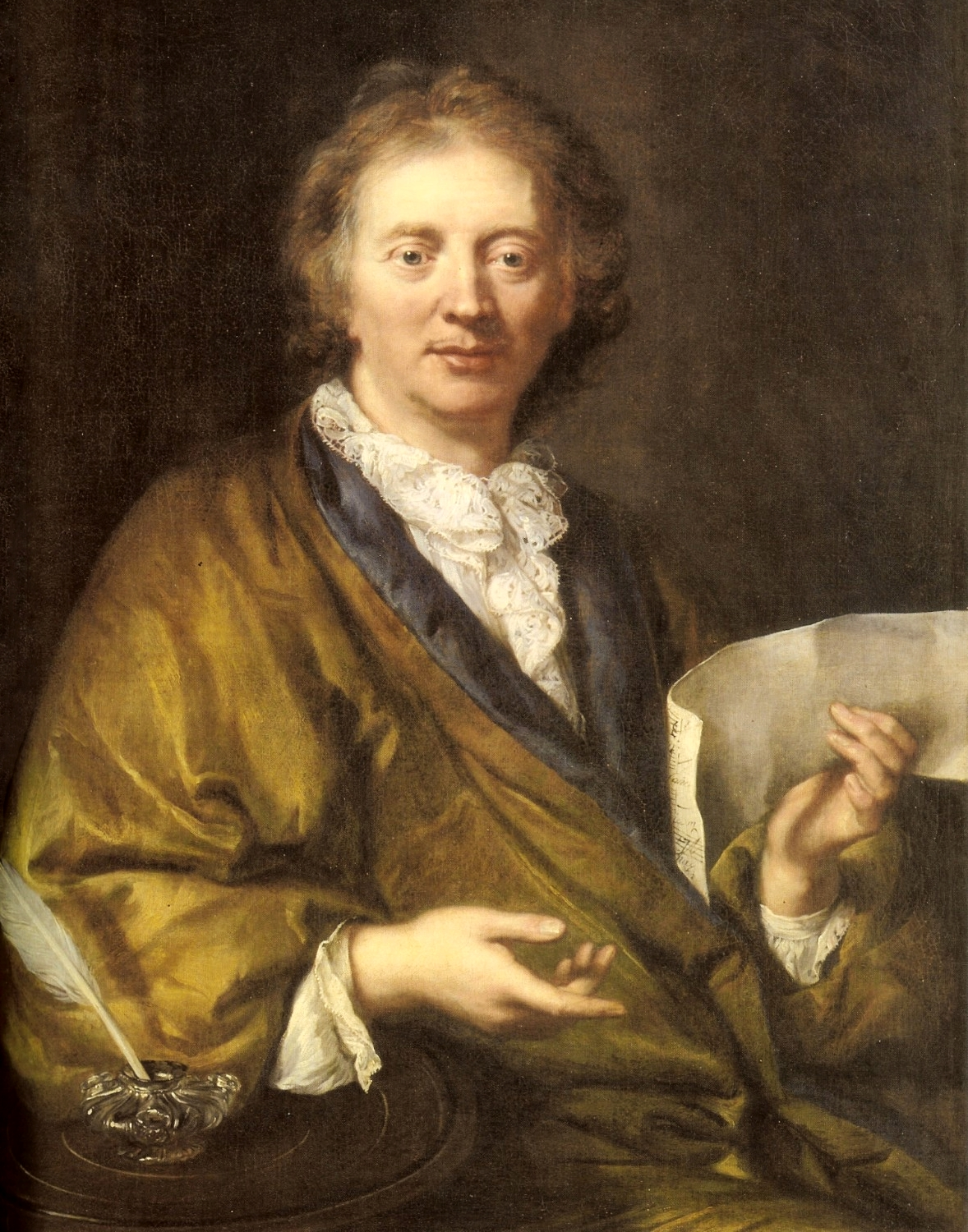
François Couperin

The Concerts royaux (singular: Concert royal; English: Royal Concerts) are chamber music suites by François Couperin written for the court of Louis XIV. Each consists of a prelude and a succession of dances in the order allemande, sarabande or courante, followed by others – but the suites are intended for listening more than dancing.

Four were produced in 1714 and published in 1722. Another ten followed in 1724, now called Nouveaux concerts, ou les Goûts réunis (referring to the "reunited" French and Italian musical tastes). Neither of the two sets has fixed instrumentation: each suite can be played by solo harpsichord or an ensemble with a bass and three melody instruments, such as a violin, a viol, and an oboe or flute. (This freedom is found also in works by Marin Marais and Gaspard Le Roux.) The first and more frequently played of the sets is as follows:

== Suites ==
=== Premier concert ===
The suite is in G major and has the following movements:

1. Prélude
2. Allemande
3. Sarabande
4. Gavotte
5. Gigue
6. Menuet en trio

=== Deuxième concert ===
The suite is in D major and has the following movements:

1. Prélude
2. Allemande fuguée
3. Air tendre
4. Air contrefugué
5. Echos

=== Troisième concert ===
The suite is in A major and has the following movements:

1. Prélude
2. Allemande
3. Courante
4. Sarabande grave
5. Gavotte
6. Musette
7. Chaconne légère

=== Quatrième concert ===
The suite is in E minor and has the following movements:

1. Prélude
2. Allemande
3. Courante française
4. Courante à l'italienne
5. Sarabande
6. Rigaudon
7. Forlane
