= Gneixendorf =

Village in Lower Austria

Coordinates: 48°26′N 15°36′E

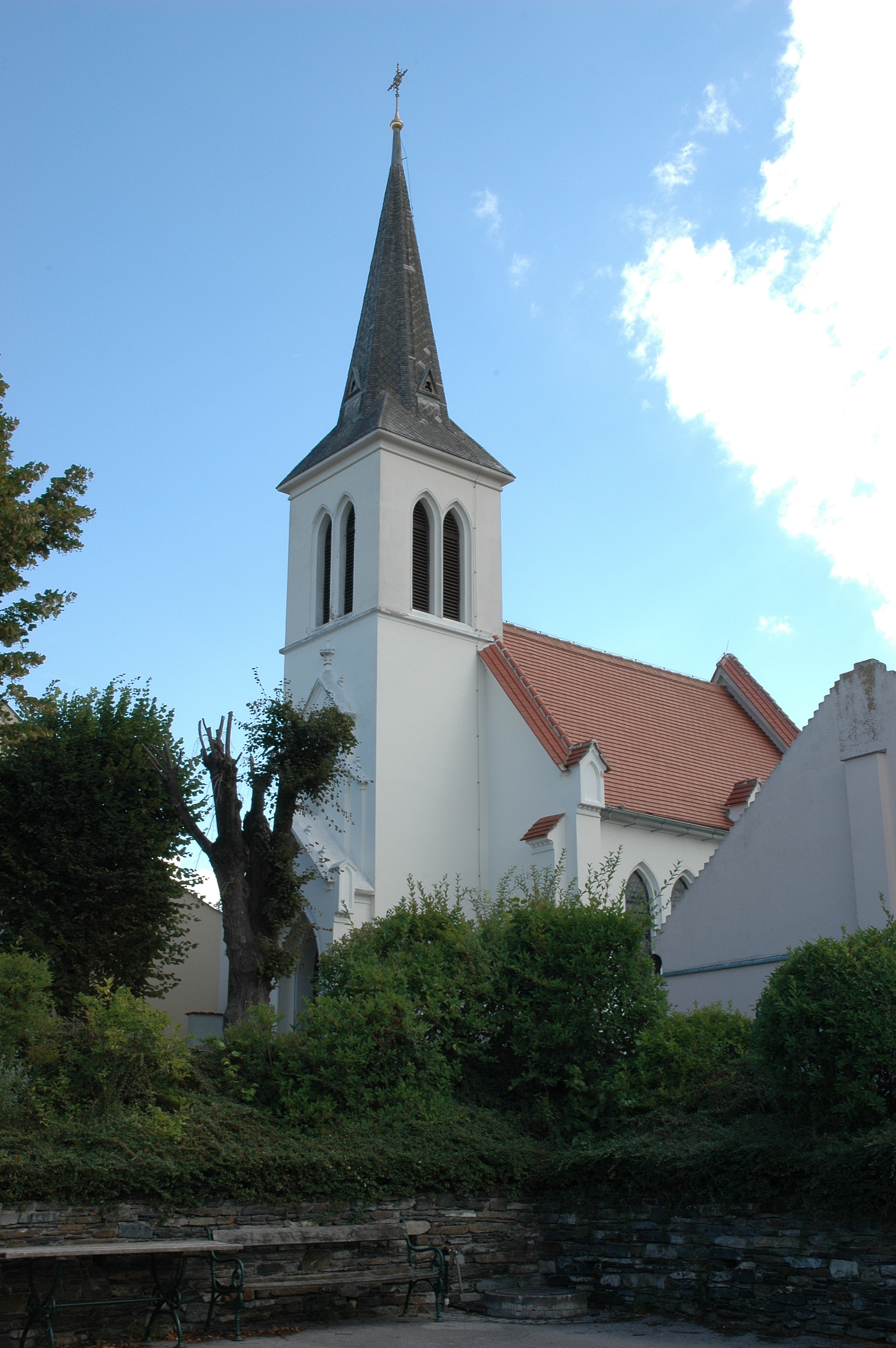
Kapelle zum heiligsten Herzen Jesu, Gneixendorf

Gneixendorf is a village near Krems in Lower Austria. It was the location of Stalag XVII-B, the setting of the Billy Wilder film Stalag 17.

The stone-age pre-history, the history of Christian orders settlement and rule and their stately renaissance buildings, followed by a manorial history, particularly of the van Beethoven and von Schweitzer families between 1820 and 1935 and the World War II break with the STALAG XVII B Prisoner-of-War camp 1940-1945 are all comprehensively documented by "Chronik von Gneixendorf", published in 2009 by Verschoenerungsverein Gneixendorf. See also Krems-Gneixendorf. Gneixendorf has been incorporated with the town of Krems since 1968.

The composer Ludwig van Beethoven spent the period September–December 1826 in Gneixendorf as the guest of his younger brother Johann, who had acquired Schloss Wasserhof (see A. Thayer, "Life of Beethoven", Princeton University Press (1964)).

== Sources ==
Gneixendorf
