= Acta Musicologica =

- Discipline: Musicology
- Language: All
- Edited by: Jen-yen Chen; Arnulf Christian Mattes; Luisa Nardini

Publication details
- Former names: Mitteilungen der Internationalen Gesellschaft für Musikwissenschaft; Bulletin de la Société internationale de Musicologie
- History: 1928–present
- Publisher: International Musicological Society (Switzerland)
- Frequency: Semiannually

Standard abbreviations
- ISO 4: Acta Musicol.

Indexing
- ISSN: 0001-6241 (print); 2296-4339 (web)
- JSTOR: 00016241
- OCLC no.: 813634466

Links
- Journal homepage

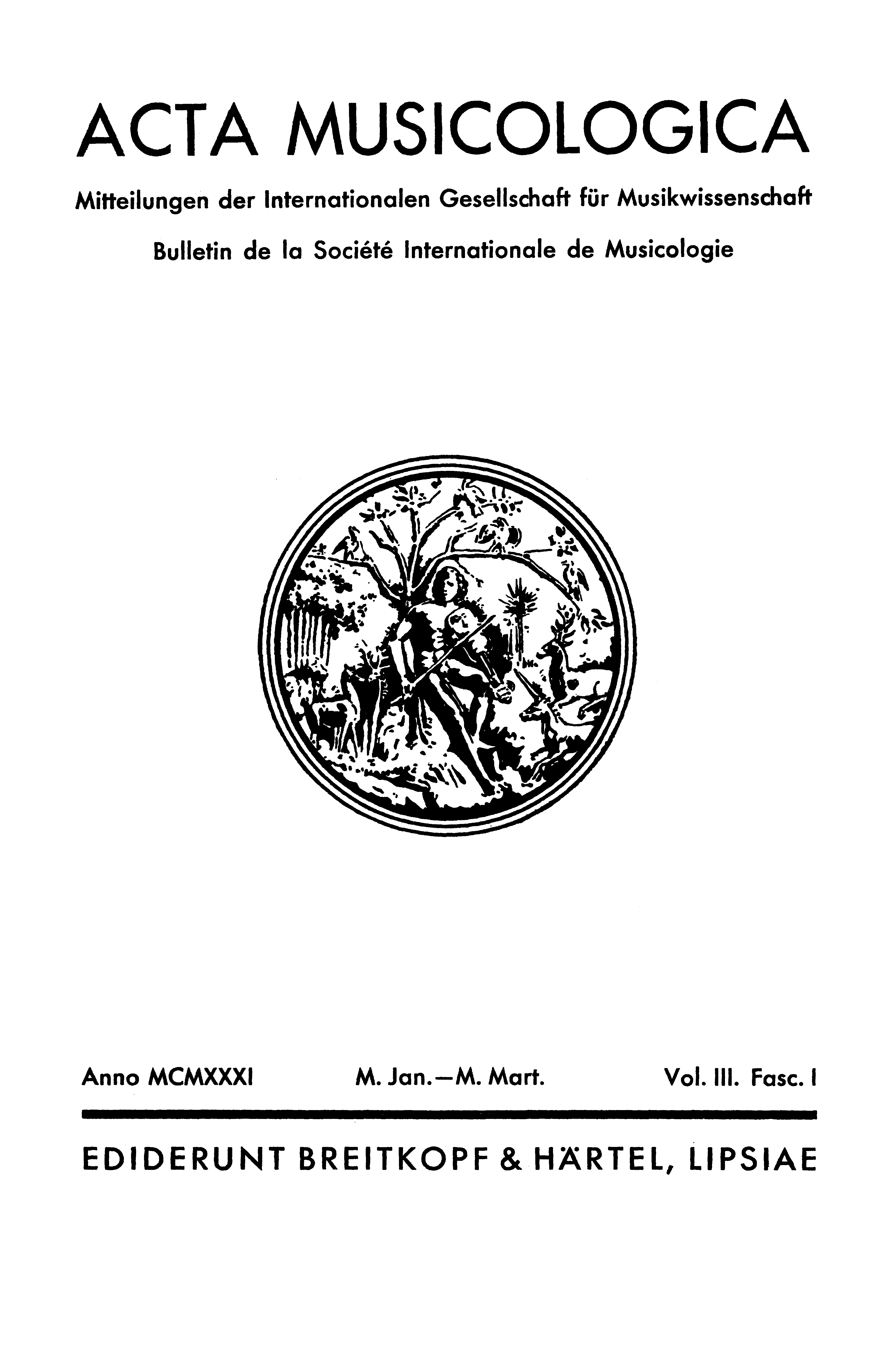
Title page is the 1931 edition of the periodical.

Acta Musicologica is the official peer-reviewed journal of the International Musicological Society (IMS), which has its headquarters in Basel, Switzerland. It is published semiannually by the IMS and contains articles on musicological research of international importance. Acta is indexed and abstracted by all the major citation indexing services and bibliographic databases.

Online versions of Acta and its predecessors are available on the journal’s website, JSTOR, and Project MUSE.

== Abstracting and indexing ==
The journal is abstracted and indexed in:

- Arts and Humanities Citation Index
- JSTOR
- Répertoire International de Littérature Musicale
- Scopus
