= Élégie pour cor et piano =

Elegy for horn and piano by Poulenc

Élégie pour cor et piano – Elegy for horn and piano – FP 168 is a short, one-movement work by the French composer Francis Poulenc, written in memory of the horn player Dennis Brain, who died in 1957. It was first performed in January 1958.

== Background and premiere ==
Poulenc had a profound admiration for the British horn player Dennis Brain. When the latter died in a car crash in 1957, aged 36, Poulenc composed the Élégie as a tribute. Unsure of the capabilities of the solo instrument, he sought the advice of the horn player Georges Barboteu before completing the piece.

The Élégie was premiered by the BBC in a broadcast on 17 February 1958, played by Brain's former Philharmonia colleague Neill Sanders, with the composer at the piano.

== Structure ==
The work typically takes between nine and ten minutes in performance. It is unique in Poulenc's oeuvre in opening with a 12-note tone row. Although Poulenc had met the leading proponent of 12-tone music, Arnold Schoenberg, and admired his music, in his own compositions he remained a tonal composer throughout his career, and this use of a serial theme is entirely untypical.

The tone row is followed by a short and strongly accented molto agitato passage in which both horn and piano play triads of C major and C minor. The tone row returns and is again displaced by the molto agitato. After a bridge passage marked "tres calme", the main theme of the Élégie, in a basic G minor, is a slow 3/4 melody for horn accompanied by quavers in the piano's middle register and a cantabile line in the bass. The musicologist Wilfrid Mellers finds both the horn melody and the piano accompaniment related to passages from Poulenc's Stabat Mater (1950) and his opera Dialogues des Carmelites (1956).

After a climax in fortissimo triads of E flat and C, both with flat sevenths, the Élégie moves gently towards its conclusion, ending pianissimo. The horn's final theme is a new 12-tone sequence ending on the leading-note of the C major harmony on which it is supported. Towards the end of the piece the piano has cadences reminiscent of the chimes of Big Ben, a reference to Brain's nationality.

== Recordings ==
Recordings listed by WorldCat in August 2021 include one by the composer, with the horn player Lucien Thévet and by these horn and piano partnerships:

- Hervé Joulain; Alexandre Tharaud
- Nicholas Korth and Julian Mitchell
- Ab Koster; Éric Le Sage
- Neil Page; Martin Qvist Hansen
- Richard Watkins; Ian Brown
- Richard Watkins; Julius Drake

== References and sources ==
=== Sources ===
- Aprahamian, Felix (1999). The Complete Chamber Music of Francis Poulenc. London: Hyperion. OCLC 1114071595.
- Ivry, Benjamin (1996). Francis Poulenc. London: Phaidon. ISBN 978-0-7148-3503-7.
- Mellers, Wilfrid (2003). Francis Poulenc. Oxford and New York: Oxford University Press. ISBN 978-0-19-816338-1.
- Watkins, Richard (2019). The Romantic Horn. London: Signum. OCLC 1102814843.
