= Lucien Thévet =

French musician

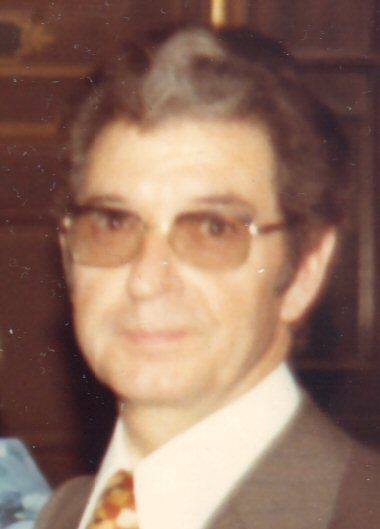

Lucien Thévet (June 3, 1914 – June 30, 2007) was a twentieth-century French horn player and teacher in France.

== Early life and education ==
Lucien Thévet's father, Eugène Thévet, an amateur musician who played the cornet, introduced his son starting at age six to various wind instruments, but the horn became Lucien's preference. He soon began performing as a soloist with local musical groups, along with his father, in particular with the Beauvais Philharmonic Society. In 1933, he entered the Paris Conservatory in the horn class of Fernand Reine and, in 1937, received First Prize for Horn in the class of Louis-Édouard Vuillermoz.

== Career ==
Thévet's professional career began in May 1937 with the Paris Radio Symphony Orchestra (renamed the Orchestre Philharmonique de Radio France in 1964) when he won the audition for first horn, a position he held until 1941. Starting in 1938, he became principal horn of the Paris Conservatoire Orchestra (l'Orchestre de la Société des Concerts du Conservatoire), and he remained there until 1967. In 1941, he left the Paris Radio Symphony Orchestra when he was also named first horn of the Paris Opera Orchestra (Orchestre de l'Opéra national de Paris), where he remained until 1974.

In addition to participating in many concerts and recordings in France with the Paris Conservatoire Orchestra, Thévet took part in several tours and festivals, e.g., to Germany, Italy, Spain, and Japan, and to the Edinburgh Festival in Scotland in 1949, at which Bruno Walter conducted Richard Strauss' Four Last Songs with soloist Kathleen Ferrier, and the Aix-en-Provence Festival in 1955 for a performance of Mozart's Marriage of Figaro. In 1950, Thévet was invited to participate in the first Casals Festival in Prades, during which he played in and recorded Bach's Brandenburg Concerto No. 1, conducted by Pablo Casals.

At the Paris Opera, Thévet performed the Siegfried horn call a dozen times (in the Richard Wagner opera of the same name), which resulted in German conductor and Wagner specialist Hans Knappertsbusch extending an invitation to him to play at the annual Bayreuth Wagner Festival (which, however, Thévet declined).

In 1964, the Paris Conservatoire Orchestra undertook a concert tour of Japan, with the goal of highlighting music by French composers. Under the baton of André Cluytens, Thévet performed, among other works, Ravel's Pavane pour une infante défunte, a work he recorded nine times during his career. In addition to his orchestra work, Thévet often appeared as a soloist, starting in 1941 with the Société Nationale de Musique, and with the Jeunesses Musicales de France starting in 1951. With the latter, he participated in several tours through France and North Africa, giving 120 concerts of chamber music from 1951 through 1955. Beginning in 1941, he performed the Mozart horn concertos some 35 times, with various orchestras.

In May 1945, Lucien Thévet premiered in France, in the presence of the composer, Benjamin Britten's Serenade for Tenor, Horn and Strings, with British tenor Peter Pears and the Paris Conservatorire Orchestra conducted by Charles Munch. In March 1950, he gave the French premiere of Richard Strauss' Second Horn Concerto with André Cluytens leading the Paris Conservatoire Orchestra.

Three contemporary composers dedicated works to him, and Thévet gave the first performance of concertos by Henri Tomasi (1955), Pierre-Max Dubois (1957), and Émile Passani (1966).

== Teaching ==
Thévet was also a teacher: he taught at the Versailles Conservatory from 1948 to 1981, at the École Normale de Musique de Paris from 1961 to 1969, and at the Jacques Ibert Conservatory in Paris' 19th Arrondissement from 1961 to 1979. He trained many horn players, both from France and abroad. At Versailles, he not only taught horn, but also coached the wind ensemble and taught classes in sight-reading and transposition for horn players, trumpet players, clarinetists, and oboists. He used his many years of pedagogical experience to write ten works, all published by Les Éditions Alphonse Leduc between 1960 and 1984.

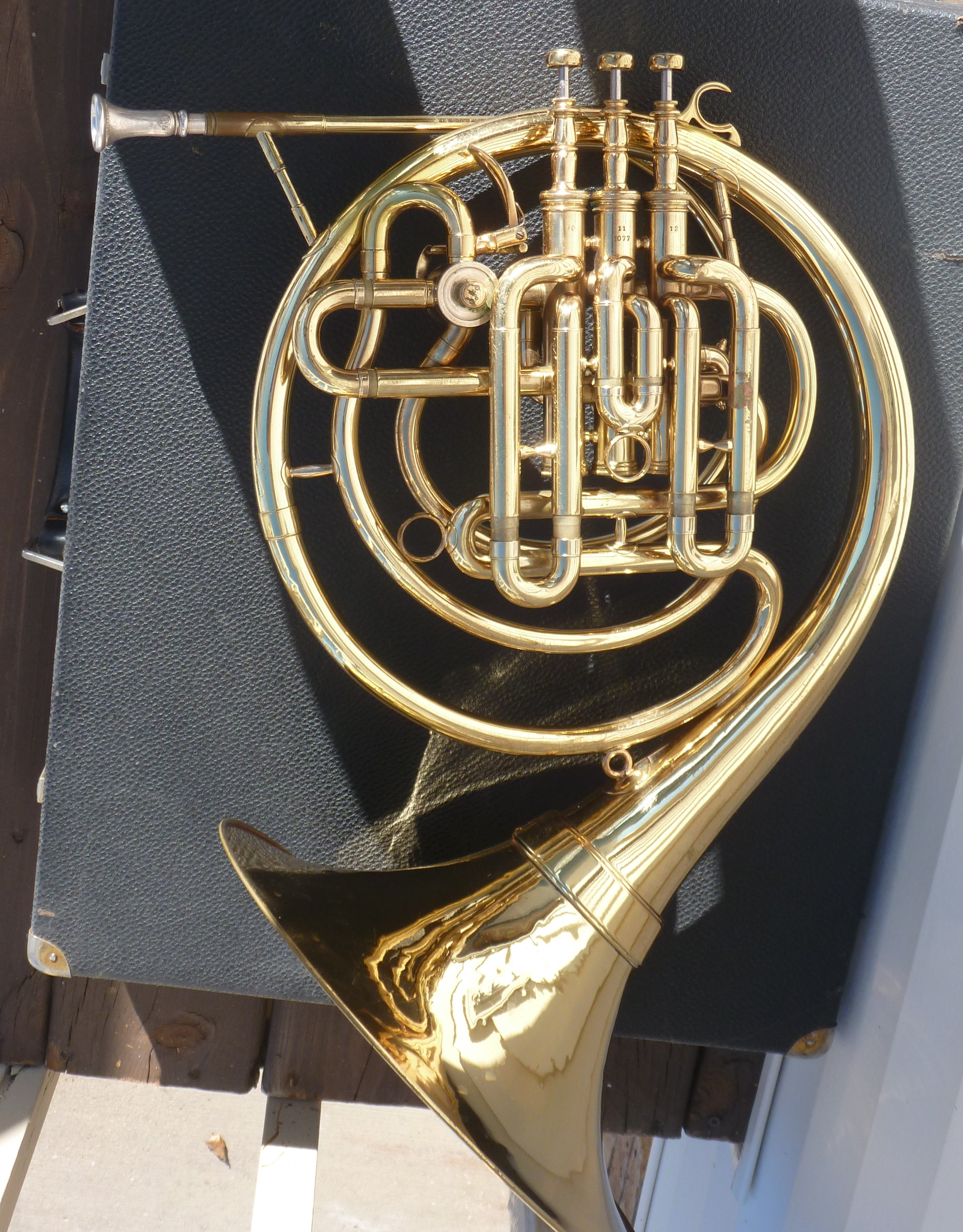
Selmer Thévet model compensating horn with ascending third valve

In 1950, he became a technical advisor to the Paris instrument manufacturer Henri Selmer, where his work led him to design a new model of horn which became available in 1964.

Starting in 1968, Thévet conducted experiments at the acoustics laboratory of the University of Paris VI, which was headed by Émile Leipp, a Director at the French National Center for Scientific Research. The goal of these experiments was, by using sonograms to do harmonic analyses of the different notes played on the horn, to ameliorate playing technique through an improved mastery of air control and breathing.

As noted by music critic Christian Merlin, Thévet was the leading exponent of the French school of horn playing, which has now all but disappeared.

== Awards ==
His awards included Officier des Palmes Académiques (1956), Chevalier des Arts et Lettres (1967), and Médaille d'Argent de la Ville de Paris (1985). He was named Honorary President of the Horn Society of France, and in 1978 became an Honorary Member of the International Horn Society. In 1995, he was the guest of honor at the International Horn Society's gathering in Yamagata, Japan, where he gave a talk titled "The Evolution and Future Perspectives of the Horn".

== Discography ==
Johann Sebastian Bach:

Brandenburg Concerto no. 1:

Prades Festival Orchestra, Pablo Casals, conductor (Columbia)
Pro Musica Chamber Orchestra, Otto Klemperer, conductor (Vox)

Grand Fugue and Sicilienne (arranged by Jean Thilde), Paris Horn Quartet (Decca)

Ludwig van Beethoven: Rondino (for wind octet), Soloists of the Paris Conservatoire Orchestra, Fernand Oubradous, conductor (His Master's Voice 78 RPM)

Johannes Brahms: Trio for Horn, Violin, and Piano, op. 40 (Decca) (https://youtube.com/watch?v=3rVAzTbeQMI)

Paul Dukas: Villanelle for Horn and Piano (Decca)

Johann Friedrich Fasch: Concerto for 2 horns, 2 oboes, 2 bassoons, and strings, Versailles Chamber Orchestra, Bernard Wahl, conductor (Vogue)

Jacques-François Gallay: Preludes for Solo Horn (Decca)

Wolfgang Amadeus Mozart:

Concerto for horn and orchestra no.3, K.447:

Society of Wind Instruments, Fernand Oubradous, conductor (Gramophone);
Fernand Oubradous Chamber Orchestra, Fernand Oubradous, conductor (Pathé) (https://www.youtube.com/watch?v=rbvvRESX4Ko)

Divertimento no. 3 (for wind octet), Soloists of the Paris Conservatoire Orchestra, Fernand Oubradous, conductor (Odéon)
Divertimento K.287 (for 2 horns and strings), Maurice Hewitt Chamber Orchestra, Maurice Hewitt, conductor (Discophiles Français)
Serenade K.361 (for 13 winds), Maurice Hewitt Ensemble, Maurice Hewitt, conductor (Discophiles Français)
Funeral Ode, Maurice Hewitt Chamber Orchestra, Maurice Hewitt, conductor (Discophiles Français)

Francis Poulenc:

Sonata for Horn, Trumpet, and Trombone (Decca)
Elegy for Horn and Piano (with Francis Poulenc at the piano) (Véga) (https://www.youtube.com/watch?v=DaHtuqlkViA)

Jean-Philippe Rameau: Suite from Les Paladins, Jean-Louis Petit Chamber Orchestra, Jean-Louis Petit, conductor (Decca)

Maurice Ravel:

Pavane pour une infante défunte [Pavane for a Dead Princess]
1. Paris Conservatoire Orchestra, Charles Munch, conductor (Gramophone)
2. Paris Conservatoire Orchestra, André Cluytens, conductor (Pathé)
3. Paris Opera Orchestra, Pierre-Michel Le Conte, conductor (Guilde Internationale du Disque)
4. New Symphonic Association of Paris, René Leibowitz, conductor (Vox)
5. Orchestra of the Théâtre des Champs-Élysées, Pedro de Freitas Branco, conductor (Ducretet-Thomson)
6. Paris Opera Orchestra, Manuel Rosenthal, conductor (Véga) – Grand Prix du Disque 1959
7. Paris Soloists Orchestra, Louis Martin, conductor (Résonances)
8. Paris Conservatoire Orchestra, André Cluytens, conductor (Columbia) – (https://www.youtube.com/watch?v=fUK7MS7dxhQ), Grand Prix du Disque 1964
9. Paris Conservatoire Orchestra, André Cluytens, conductor, (concert performance recorded in Tokyo, Japan, on May 7, 1964) (CD Altus)

Gioacchino Rossini: Quartet no. 2 for flute, clarinet, horn, and bassoon (Amphion)

Richard Wagner: Siegfried Horn Call (Decca) (https://www.youtube.com/watch?v=SArjsalLuw4)

Fanfares: An ensemble of soloists playing Selmer instruments, Armand Birbaum, conductor (Philips-Fontana), perform:

Tony Aubin: Fanfare for Cressida
Paul Dukas: Fanfare to precede La Péri
André Jolivet: Fanfares for Britannicus
Henri Tomasi: Liturgical Fanfares
Maurice Jarre: "Alexander" Fanfares (trumpets, trombone, and percussion only)

In 2000, a CD titled Lucien Thévet, Horn – Récital 1 was brought out by Arpèges-Diffusion in its Prestige series. The CD includes works by Paul Dukas (Villanelle), Jacques-François Gallay (Préludes), Richard Wagner (Siegfried Horn Call), Johann Sebastian Bach (Grand Fugue and Sicilienne, arranged for four horns), Francis Poulenc (Élégie), and Johannes Brahms (Trio for horn, violin, and piano).

Lucien Thévet's playing, with its signature use of vibrato, can also be heard on numerous recordings by the Paris Conservatoire Orchestra from 1938 to 1967, and by the Paris Opera Orchestra from 1941 to 1974.

=== Pedagogical works ===
(all published by Éditions Alphonse Leduc, Paris)

1. Méthode complète de cor (en trois volumes et quatre langues: français, anglais, allemand, espagnol) [Complete Horn Method in three volumes, with text in four languages: French, English, German, and Spanish]
2. Soixante études pour cor (en deux cahiers) (1963) [Sixty studies for horn, in two volumes]
3. Cinquante exercices à changement de ton pour cor (1964) [Fifty exercises with key-change for horn]
4. Soixante-cinq études-déchiffrages pour cor (1967) [Sixty-five sight-reading exercises for horn]
5. Vingt études pour cor (1969) [Twenty studies for horn]
6. Cent exercices rythmiques à 2 et 3 parties pour tous les instruments en clé de sol (en deux cahiers) (1975) [One hundred rhythmic exercises in 2 and 3 parts for all G-clef instruments – in two volumes]
7. Cinquante exercices à changement de ton pour trompette et cornet à pistons (1979) [Fifty exercises in key-change for trumpet and cornet]
8. La transposition à vue. Méthode à l'usage de tous les instrumentistes, chefs d'orchestre, et orchestrateurs (1979) [Sight-transposition: a method for instrumentalists, conductors, and orchestrators]
9. Soixante-cinq études-déchiffrages pour trombone (1981) [Sixty-five sight-reading exercises for trombone]
10. Le débutant corniste: 120 exercices d'initiation (1984) [The beginning horn player: 120 introductory exercises]
