= Quatre Motets pour un temps de pénitence =

Set of 4-part vocal pieces by Francis Poulenc

- Motets by Francis Poulenc
- Catalogue: FP 97
- Text: Psalms; Responsories
- Language: Latin
- Composed: 1938–39
- Scoring: SATB a cappella

Quatre Motets pour un temps de pénitence (Four Penitential Motets), FP 97, are four sacred motets composed by Francis Poulenc in 1938–39. He wrote them on Latin texts for penitence, scored for four unaccompanied voices.

== Structure and texts ==
The four motets are:

1. Timor et tremor
2. Vinea mea electa
3. Tenebrae factae sunt
4. Tristis est anima mea

The text for the first motet, Timor et tremor (Great fear and trembling), combines verses from psalms 54 and 30, which Orlando di Lasso had also set as a motet. The other three motets are based on three responsories for the Holy Week: "Vinea mea electa" (Vine that I loved as my own), a responsory for the matins of Good Friday, "Tenebrae factae sunt" (Darkness fell upon the Earth), a responsory for the matins of Holy Saturday, and "Tristis est anima mea" (Sad is my soul and sorrowful), a responsory for the matins of Maundy Thursday.

A performance of the work will last for approximately 13 minutes.

== History ==
Poulenc returned to sacred music first in 1937 when he composed the missa brevis Messe en sol majeur (Mass in G). He then wrote the four motets, at different times. He wrote "Timor et tremor" last, in Noizay in January 1939, and dedicated it to Monsieur l'Abbé Maillet. He composed "Vinea mea electa" there in December 1938 and dedicated it to Yvonne Gouverné. "Tenebrae factae sunt" was the first of the four motets, written there in July, dedicated to Nadia Boulanger. Poulenc composed "Tristis est anima mea" in Paris in November 1938 and dedicated it to Ernest Bourmauck. The motets are written for a mixed choir a cappella, at times further divided.

The first performance was sung in February 1939, probably in Paris, by Les Petits Chanteurs à la Croix de Bois, repeated in several churches in Paris during the Holy Week, according to a review by Claude Chamfray.

== Selected recordings ==
Recordings were made by the chamber choir Polyphony, conducted by Stephen Layton, by the Westminster Cathedral Choir, conducted by James O'Donnell, and by The Cambridge Singers, conducted by John Rutter, among others. The Norwegian chamber choir Grex Vocalis, conducted by Carl Høgset, recorded the motets along with the Messe en sol majeur.

== Bibliography ==
- Bowen, Meurig (2008). "Francis Poulenc (1899–1963): Quatre motets pour un temps de pénitence (1938–39)". Hyperion Records.
- Lace, Ian (2000). "Francis Poulenc (1899–1963) / Libertè – Francis Poulenc a cappella". musicweb-international.com.
- Schmidt, Carl B. (1995). The Music of Francis Poulenc (1899–1963): A Catalogue. Oxford: Clarendon Press. ISBN 978-0-19-816336-7.
- Schulz, Ingo (2016). "Francis Poulenc (1899–1963): Quatre motets pour un temps de pénitence (1938–39)" (in German). emmaus.de. Archived from the original on 2 July 2016.
