= Huit nocturnes =

Piano compositions by Francis Poulenc

- by Francis Poulenc
- Catalogue: F. 56
- Composed: 1929-1938
- Published: 1939 - Paris
- Publisher: Heugel
- Duration: 21 minutes approx.
- Movements: 8
- Scoring: Piano

Huit nocturnes (in English, Eight Nocturnes), FP 56, is a cycle of nocturnes for solo piano by French composer Francis Poulenc. Written over a period of nine years, each one of the nocturnes were published separately.

== Background ==
Poulenc composed his nocturnes as individual pieces and never conceived them as a set. The earliest account of these pieces dates back to 1929, when he started composing short piano pieces, some of them with titles, and each piece was dedicated to an important person in Poulenc's life. In 1938, when he completed the eighth and final nocturne, he wrote that it would serve as a "coda to the cycle", indicating that it was then that he conceived the nocturnes as a set.

Because these pieces were never conceived as a cycle until the last nocturne was finished, each nocturne has a different completion date and place. The printed score of the first nocturne says it was finished in 1929, but the manuscript shows "Noizay 1930"; the second nocturne was finished in Paris on December 24, 1933; the third, in Malines, in 1934; the fourth, in Rome, in March 1934; the fifth, in 1934, with no specification as to the place it was completed in; the sixth was completed in Noizay, in May 1934; the seventh, in August 1935, at an unspecified location. Finally, the last nocturne was finished in Noizay in December 1938, many years later.

Except for the last one, all nocturnes have dedications. The list of dedicatees is as follows: (1st) Suzette [Chanlaire], (2nd) Janine Salles, (3rd) Paul Collaer, (4th) Julien Green, (5th) Jean-Michel Frank, (6th) Waldemar Strenger, (7th) Fred Timar. The fourth nocturne even features a direct quote from the dedicatee's Le visionnaire (1934).

Pas une note des valses ou des écossaises ne se perdait dans toute la maison, si bien que le malade eut sa part de la fête et put rêver sur son grabat aux bonnes années de sa jeunesse.

[Not a note of the waltzes or the schottisches was lost throughout the house, so much so that the sick man had his share of the celebration and could dream on his pallet of the good years of his youth.]

— Julien Green, Le visionnaire

It is not known when the premiere of the set was given, but Poulenc gave early performances of individual nocturnes before they were released as a set, most notably in 1935. These concerts were given in Oran, Algiers, Tunis, Lyon, Bordeaux, and England, among others. Each individual piece was published by Heugel, in Paris, from 1932 to 1939. In 1939, the whole cycle was reissued by the same publisher as a set.

== Structure ==
This set of eight nocturnes has an approximate duration of 21 minutes and is scored for solo piano. The list of nocturnes is as follows:

1. C major. Sans traîner - Le double plus lent
2. A minor. Bal de jeunes filles. Très animé - Strictement au même mouvement - Très lent
3. F major. Les cloches de Malines. Modéré mais sans lenteur - Agité et mystérieux - Tempo I
4. C minor. Bal fantôme. Lent, très las et piano
5. D minor. Phalènes. Presto misterioso
6. G major. Très calme mais sans traîner - = 60 - Mouvement du début
7. E-flat major. Assez allant - Toujours strictement au même mouvement
8. G major. (pour servir de coda au cycle). Très modéré
