= Salle Huyghens =

Coordinates: 48.8414°N 2.329°E

From 1916 to 1920, the Salle Huyghens located at 6 rue Huyghens in the 14th arrondissement of Paris, was the name given to the studio of painter Émile Lejeune (1885–1964) (former stables), which the latter put at the disposal of musicians, poets and painters friends to use as a theater and exhibition hall.

The venue was occupied by the members of Les Six: (Georges Auric, Louis Durey, Arthur Honegger, Darius Milhaud, Francis Poulenc and Germaine Tailleferre). It also gave young painters the opportunity to exhibit their first works: Georges Braque, Juan Gris, Amedeo Modigliani, and Pablo Picasso. Some evenings also included declamations by fashionable poets, such as Jean Cocteau or Blaise Cendrars.

The performances, called "Lyre et palettes" after the name of a collective named "Société lyre et palettes" created in 1916, were financed by Pierre Bertin, Blaise Cendrars, and Félix Delgrange. They welcomed a diverse public, very chic and very bohemian, like the Montparnasse district at its peak.

Delgrange had abandoned the cello to devote himself entirely to the cause of the nascent art. He also organized concerts in the Salle Huyghens. The benches without backs were uncomfortable, the atmosphere was unbreathable because of smoke from the stove, but any high society of Paris, both the artists and the new music lovers, played elbows to be there.
