= Yvonne Gouverné =

French pianist and conductor (1890–1982)

Yvonne Gouverné, née Yvonne Marcelle Gouverné, (6 February 1890 – 26 October 1982) was a 20th-century French pianist by training, who went on to become an accompanist and choir conductor.

== Biography ==
=== Early career ===
Born in the 9th arrondissement of Paris, the daughter of a physician, Yvonne Gouverné moved to a career as a pianist after studying at the Schola Cantorum de Paris. In 1918, following a decisive meeting with André Caplet, she turned to the profession of accompanist and singer.

With Caplet, at the Concerts Pasdeloup, they premiered in concert Le Martyre de saint Sébastien by Claude Debussy in November 1922 and Miroir de Jésus by Caplet with Claire Croiza as the soloist in June 1923. After André Caplet's death in 1925, she decided to dedicate herself to making her master's works known and continued her career at the Walther Straram concerts between 1925 and 1933. Among so many others, she participated in the premiere of Œdipus Rex by Igor Stravinsky (1928) and Judith, oratorio by Arthur Honegger in 1928.

In 1929/30, again with Walther Straram, at the Théâtre des Champs-Élysées, she hosted innovative radio programs called "Vulgarisation musicale".

Still in 1930, she joined Roger Désormière at the Société de musique d'autrefois (SMA), first foray into early music, which we call today Baroque music (Désormière and Yvonne Gouverné had already collaborated in a concert of homage to Caplet in 1927), the SMA which she met again after 1956. Again with Desormière, it was the foundation of the Orchestre symphonique de Paris with the premiere of Igor Markevitch's Cantata on 4 June 1930.

=== Foundation of Choir ===
In 1934, after the death of Walther Straram, Gouverné founded a vocal ensemble soon to be associated with the "Triton concerts" by Pierre-Octave Ferroud, Henry Barraud, Jean Rivier and Emmanuel Bondeville, which led to the first a cappella choir auditions by Florent Schmitt, Francis Poulenc, Roland-Manuel and the performing of Les noces by Stravinsky conducted by Charles Munch. Beginning in 1935, Munch, both at the Philharmonic Orchestra and the Orchestre de la Société des Concerts du Conservatoire, will always call on Gouverné for the choirs. It was the time of the first exceptional concerts: the Requiem by Berlioz in the courtyard of honour of the Invalides on 16 June 1938 with Munch, the Requiem by Verdi in the same year with Bruno Walter, at Salle Pleyel.

Thanks to Bondeville, the choir also entered the Radio Tour Eiffel station, which led her to meet again Desormière at the newly created (1934) Orchestre national de France by Désiré-Émile Inghelbrecht. She worked with the National Orchestra until the early 1960s.

During the war, after the retreat to Rennes, she was first charged with broadcasts to the United States and then returned to Paris in September 1940. During all the Occupation, she will continue to work with Désormière (especially on the famous recording of Pelléas et Mélisande) and with Munch. The Yvonne Gouverné choir thus performed at the first audition of the Apocalypse by Jean Françaix, for Jeanne d'Arc au bûcher by Honegger conducted by Munch on disc, in 1942.

Still in 1942, Emmanuel Bondeville, music director of the radio station, instructed Gouverné to gradually take over the French radio broadcasts in Paris.

=== Years post WWII ===
At the Liberation of France, Henry Barraud, appointed musical director of the Radiodiffusion française, assigned her the task of taking over the entire choir formation, dispersed and dismembered by four years of occupation. Hence in 1946, the foundation of the Maîtrise de Radio France and in 1947 the rapprochement of the Symphonic Choir and the Lyric Choir.

Premieres also followed one another, the Trois petites liturgies de la présence divine by Olivier Messiaen at the Concerts de la Pléiade and on disks in 1945 and the Requiem by Maurice Duruflé in 1946, with the Orchestre national de France, with Hélène Bouvier and Camille Maurane as soloists, both conducted by Roger Désormière. Still with the National, on 17 February 1947, it was Eugène Bigot who conducted the premiere of the Ode au peuple for choir and orchestra by Louis Saguer. On 8 May 1947 the premiere of Mystère des saints innocents by Henry Barraud was conducted by Manuel Rosenthal and Naissance du verbe by Giacinto Scelsi was premiered again by Désormière on 28 November 1949.

Gouverné also worked for the cinema, such as for example for le Rêve after Émile Zola by Jacques de Baroncelli, Golgotha (music by Jacques Ibert) by Julien Duvivier, la Vie parisienne (Based on Offenbach's music) by Robert Siodmak, The Citadel of Silence (Darius Milhaud) by Marcel L'Herbier, Port of Shadows (Maurice Jaubert) by Marcel Carné, Véronique, etc.; for the theatre, at the Théâtre Français, Athalie by Jean Racine (music by Haendel, adaptation by Jacques Chailley).

Gouverné died in the 16th arrondissement of Paris on 26 October 1982 aged 92.

== Homages ==
Francis Poulenc dedicated to her a piece from the Quatre motets pour un temps de pénitence composed in 1938 and 1939: Vinea mea electa.

== Discography ==
In her discography, Gouverné, in addition to Messiaen, was particularly fond of distinguishing:

- 1941 La Danse des morts by Honegger with Charles Panzéra (baritone); Jean-Louis Barrault (narrator); Orchestre de la Société des concerts du Conservatoire, conductor Charles Munch (26 January 1941, Cascavelle "La France résistante") OCLC 53244509
- 1954, Grand Prix du Disque: The Symphony of Psalms by Igor Stravinsky (conductor Horenstein) OCLC 916398123
- 1955, Grand Prix du disque: Le Mystère des Saints Innocents by Henry Barraud (conductor Paul Kletzki) OCLC 806480131
- 1956 Le Château de feu by Darius Milhaud (conductor Darius Milhaud), premiere given at the Palais de Chaillot on 30 November 1955. (LP Chant du Monde) OCLC 880098675

Famous and historic recording:

- Claude Debussy, Pelléas and Mélisande led by Roger Désormière(24 April/17 November 1941, EMI) OCLC 85482367

== Sources ==
- "Hommage à Yvonne Gouverné". Éditions Zodiaque (in French). No. 143. Abbaye Sainte-Marie de la Pierre-qui-Vire. 1985. pp. 2–38. OCLC 716227884.
- Yvonne Gouverné, Ce que je dois à Désormière, in Roger Désormière et son temps; textes en hommage réunis par Denise Mayer et Pierre Souvtchinsky. Domaine musical (in French). Monaco: Éditions du Rocher. 1966. p. 189. OCLC 28594456.
