= Richard Chanlaire =

French painter

Richard Chanlaire (1896–1973) was a French painter, also known as the first serious lover of the composer Francis Poulenc.

Chanlaire exhibited regularly in Paris: at the Salon de la Société Nationale des Beaux-Arts in 1928–29, the Salon des Tuileries in 1929–30, and the Salon des Artistes Indépendants in 1931–32. He became known, almost by accident, for painting on fabrics. For a bet, he improvised an evening shawl for a lady who had forgotten her own. Later Christian Dior, Pierre Balmain, and Jacques Fath engaged Chanlaire to design items in their collections. As well as garments, Chanlaire also worked on tablecloths, screens, and curtains.
