= Francis Poulenc =

French composer and pianist (1899–1963)

- Poulenc in 1922
- Born: 7 January 1899; Paris
- Died: 30 January 1963 (aged 64); Paris
- Occupations: Composer; pianist
- Works: List of compositions

Francis Jean Marcel Poulenc (French: [fʁɑ̃sis ʒɑ̃ maʁsɛl pulɛ̃k]; 7 January 1899 – 30 January 1963) was a French composer and pianist. His compositions include songs, solo piano works, chamber music, choral pieces, operas, ballets, and orchestral concert music. Among the best-known are the piano suite Mouvements perpétuels (1919), the ballet Les Biches (1923), the Concert champêtre (1928) for harpsichord and orchestra, the Organ Concerto (1938), the opera Dialogues des Carmélites (1957), and the Gloria (1959) for soprano, choir, and orchestra.

As the only son of a prosperous manufacturer, Poulenc was expected to follow his father into the family firm, and he was not allowed to enrol at a conservatoire. He studied with the pianist Ricardo Viñes, who became his mentor after the composer's parents died. Poulenc also made the acquaintance of Erik Satie, under whose tutelage he became one of a group of young composers known collectively as "Les Six". In his early works Poulenc became known for his high spirits and irreverence. During the 1930s a much more serious side to his nature emerged, particularly in the religious music he composed from 1936 onwards, which he alternated with his more light-hearted works.

In addition to his work as a composer, Poulenc was an accomplished pianist. He was particularly celebrated for his performing partnerships with the baritone Pierre Bernac (who also advised him in vocal writing) and the soprano Denise Duval. He toured in Europe and America with both of them, and made a number of recordings as a pianist. He was among the first composers to see the importance of the gramophone, and he recorded extensively from 1928 onwards.

In his later years, and for decades after his death, Poulenc had a reputation, particularly in his native country, as a humorous, lightweight composer, and his religious music was often overlooked. In the 21st century, more attention has been given to his serious works, with many new productions of Dialogues des Carmélites and La Voix humaine worldwide, and numerous live and recorded performances of his songs and choral music.

== Life ==
=== Early years ===
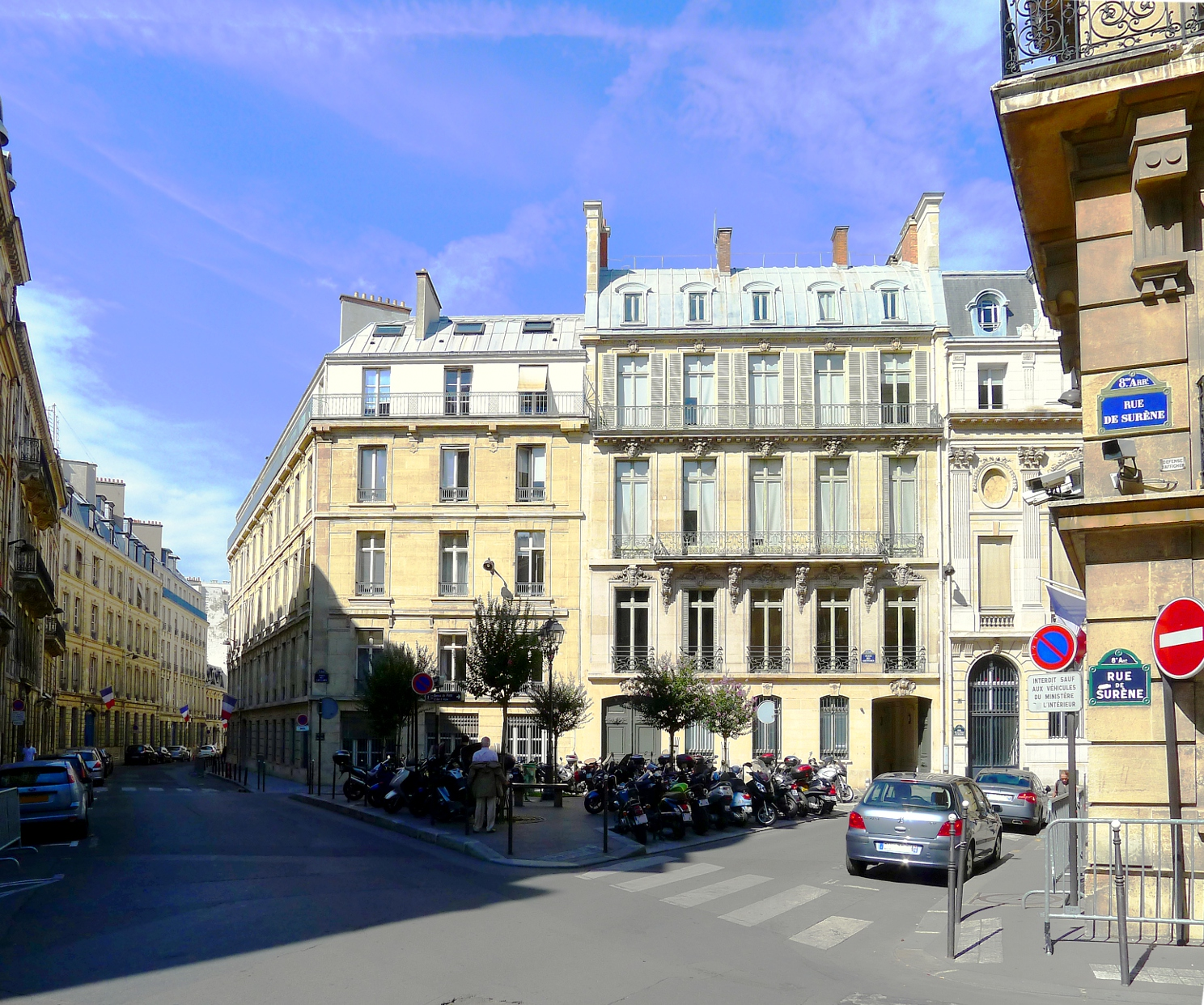
Place des Saussaies, Paris, where Poulenc was born

Poulenc was born in the 8th arrondissement of Paris on 7 January 1899, the younger child and only son of Émile Poulenc and his wife, Jenny-Zoé, née Royer. Émile Poulenc was a joint owner of Poulenc Frères, a successful manufacturer of pharmaceuticals (later Rhône-Poulenc). He was a member of a pious Roman Catholic family from Espalion in the département of Aveyron. Jenny Poulenc was from a Parisian family with wide artistic interests. In Poulenc's view, the two sides of his nature grew out of this background: a deep religious faith from his father's family and a worldly and artistic side from his mother's. Claude Rostand later described Poulenc as "half-monk and half-naughty boy". (Note: "...y a en lui du moine et du voyou." "Voyou" has no exact English translation, and as well as "naughty boy", it has been variously rendered as "ragamuffin or street-urchin", "guttersnipe", "bad boy", "bounder", "hooligan", and "rascal".)

Poulenc grew up in a musical household; his mother was a capable pianist, with a wide repertoire ranging from classical to less elevated works that gave him a lifelong taste for what he called "adorable bad music". (Note: Jenny Poulenc's favourites ranged from Mozart, Schumann and Chopin to popular sentimental pieces by composers such as Anton Rubinstein. Poulenc dedicated his opera Dialogues des Carmélites (1956) to "the memory of my mother, who revealed music to me".) He took piano lessons from the age of five, initially from her; when he was eight he first heard the music of Claude Debussy and was fascinated by the originality of the sound. Other composers whose works influenced his development were Franz Schubert and Igor Stravinsky: the former's Winterreise and the latter's The Rite of Spring made a deep impression on him. At his father's insistence, Poulenc followed a conventional school career, studying at the Lycée Condorcet in Paris rather than at a music conservatory.

In 1916 a childhood friend, Raymonde Linossier (1897–1930), introduced Poulenc to Adrienne Monnier's bookshop, the Maison des Amis des Livres. There he met the avant-garde poets Guillaume Apollinaire, Max Jacob, Paul Éluard and Louis Aragon. He later set many of their poems to music. In the same year he became the pupil of pianist Ricardo Viñes. The biographer Henri Hell comments that Viñes's influence on his pupil was profound, both as to pianistic technique and the style of Poulenc's keyboard works. Poulenc later said of Viñes:

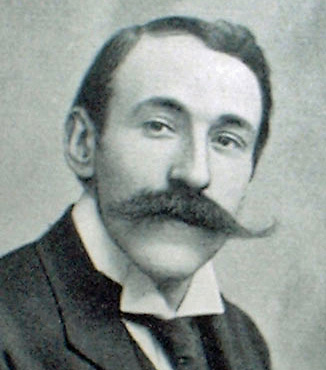
Pianist Ricardo Viñes, with whom Poulenc studied from 1914

He was a most delightful man, a bizarre hidalgo with enormous moustachios, a flat-brimmed sombrero in the purest Spanish style, and button boots which he used to rap my shins when I didn't change the pedalling enough. ... I admired him madly, because, at this time, in 1914, he was the only virtuoso who played Debussy and Ravel. That meeting with Viñes was paramount in my life: I owe him everything ... In reality it is to Viñes that I owe my fledgling efforts in music and everything I know about the piano.

When Poulenc was sixteen his mother died; his father died two years later. Viñes became more than a teacher: he was, in the words of Myriam Chimènes in the Grove Dictionary of Music and Musicians, the young man's "spiritual mentor". He encouraged his pupil to compose, and he later gave the premieres of three early Poulenc works. (Note: The works were Trois mouvements perpétuels, Trois pastorales and Suite pour piano.) Through him Poulenc became friendly with two composers who helped shape his early development: Georges Auric and Erik Satie.

Auric, who was the same age as Poulenc, was an early developer musically; by the time the two met, Auric's music had already been performed at important Parisian concert venues. The two young composers shared a similar musical outlook and enthusiasms, and for the rest of Poulenc's life Auric was his most trusted friend and guide. Poulenc called him "my true brother in spirit". Satie, an eccentric figure, isolated from the mainstream French musical establishment, was a mentor to several rising young composers, including Auric, Louis Durey and Arthur Honegger. After initially dismissing Poulenc as a bourgeois amateur, he relented and admitted him to the circle of protégés, whom he called "Les Nouveaux Jeunes". Poulenc described Satie's influence on him as "immediate and wide, on both the spiritual and musical planes". Pianist Alfred Cortot commented that Poulenc's Trois mouvements perpétuels were "reflections of the ironical outlook of Satie adapted to the sensitive standards of the current intellectual circles".

=== First compositions and Les Six ===
Poulenc made his début as a composer in 1917 with his Rapsodie nègre, a ten-minute, five-movement piece for baritone and chamber group; (Note: The Poulenc scholar Carl B Schmidt lists two works earlier than Rapsodie nègre, unperformed and known to have been destroyed by the composer: "Processional pour la crémation d'un mandarin" (Processional for the Cremation of a Mandarin) (1914) and Préludes (1916) both for solo piano; several later pieces composed between 1917 and 1919 were also destroyed or lost.) it was dedicated to Satie and premiered at one of a series of concerts of new music run by the singer Jane Bathori. There was a fashion for African arts in Paris at the time, and Poulenc was delighted to run across some published verses, purportedly Liberian but full of Parisian boulevard slang. He used one of the poems in two sections of the rhapsody. The baritone engaged for the first performance lost his nerve on the platform, and the composer, though no singer, jumped in. This jeu d'esprit was the first of many examples of what Anglophone critics came to call "leg-Poulenc". (Note: A pun on the English colloquial expression "leg-pulling" – playful, humorous deception.) Maurice Ravel was amused by the piece and commented on Poulenc's ability to invent his own folklore. Stravinsky was impressed enough to use his influence to secure Poulenc a contract with a publisher, a kindness that Poulenc never forgot.

Top to bottom: Igor Stravinsky, Erik Satie, Maurice Ravel

In 1917 Poulenc got to know Ravel well enough to have serious discussions with him about music. He was dismayed by Ravel's judgments, which exalted composers whom Poulenc thought little of above those he greatly admired. (Note: Poulenc recalled Ravel as saying that Saint-Saëns was a genius, Schumann was mediocre and much inferior to Mendelssohn, late Debussy (such as Jeux) was poor, and Chabrier's orchestration incompetent. Chabrier's music was one of Poulenc's particular enthusiasms. He said in the 1950s, "Ah! Chabrier, I love him as one loves a father! An indulgent father, always merry, his pockets full of tasty tit-bits. Chabrier's music is a treasure-house you could never exhaust. I just could not do without it. It consoles me on my darkest days, because you know ... I am a sad man – who likes to laugh, as do all sad men.") He told Satie of this unhappy encounter; Satie replied with a dismissive epithet for Ravel who, he said, talked "a load of rubbish". (Note: In the original, Poulenc's quotation of Satie's words is given as, "Ce c... de Ravel, c'est stupide tout ce qu'il dit!") For many years Poulenc was equivocal about Ravel's music, though always respecting him as a man. Ravel's modesty about his own music particularly appealed to Poulenc, who sought throughout his life to follow Ravel's example. (Note: Poulenc commented in 1958 how much he had come to admire Ravel and that he had been glad to be able to show it, not only in words, but as a pianist, through his interpretations of Ravel's works.)

From January 1918 to January 1921 Poulenc was a conscript in the French army in the last months of the First World War and the immediate post-war period. Between July and October 1918 he served at the Franco-German front, after which he was given a series of auxiliary posts, ending as a typist at the Ministry of Aviation. His duties allowed him time for composition; the Trois mouvements perpétuels for piano and the Sonata for Piano Duet were written at the piano of the local elementary school at Saint-Martin-sur-le-Pré, and he completed his first song cycle, Le bestiaire, setting poems by Apollinaire. The sonata did not create a deep public impression, but the song cycle made the composer's name known in France, and the Trois mouvements perpétuels rapidly became an international success. The exigencies of music-making in wartime taught Poulenc much about writing for whatever instruments were available; then, and later, some of his works were for unusual combinations of players.

At this stage in his career Poulenc was conscious of his lack of academic musical training; the critic and biographer Jeremy Sams writes that it was the composer's good luck that the public mood was turning against late-romantic lushness in favour of the "freshness and insouciant charm" of his works, technically unsophisticated though they were. Four of Poulenc's early works were premiered at the Salle Huyghens in the Montparnasse area, where between 1917 and 1920 the cellist Félix Delgrange presented concerts of music by young composers. Among them were Auric, Durey, Honegger, Darius Milhaud and Germaine Tailleferre who, with Poulenc, became known collectively as "Les Six". After one of their concerts, the critic Henri Collet published an article titled, "The Five Russians, the Six Frenchmen and Satie". According to Milhaud:

In completely arbitrary fashion Collet chose the names of six composers, Auric, Durey, Honegger, Poulenc, Tailleferre and myself, for no other reason than that we knew each other, that we were friends and were represented in the same programmes, but without the slightest concern for our different attitudes and our different natures. Auric and Poulenc followed the ideas of Cocteau, Honegger was a product of German Romanticism and my leanings were towards a Mediterranean lyrical art ... Collet's article made such a wide impression that the Groupe des Six had come into being. (Note: Milhaud's view has been questioned by later writers. In Music & Letters in 1957 Vera Rašín cast doubt on the statement that Collet's choice was arbitrary, surmising that the label "Les Six" was carefully planned by Jean Cocteau, who had taken the group under his wing. A similar view was put forward by the musicologist Robert Orledge in 2003.)

Cocteau, though similar in age to Les Six, was something of a father-figure to the group. His literary style, "paradoxical and lapidary" in Hell's phrase, was anti-romantic, concise and irreverent. It greatly appealed to Poulenc, who made his first setting of Cocteau's words in 1919 and his last in 1961. When members of Les Six collaborated with each other, they contributed their own individual sections to the joint work. Their 1920 piano suite L'Album des Six consists of six separate and unrelated pieces. Their 1921 ballet Les mariés de la tour Eiffel contains three sections by Milhaud, two apiece by Auric, Poulenc and Tailleferre, one by Honegger and none by Durey, who was already distancing himself from the group.

In the early 1920s Poulenc remained concerned at his lack of formal musical training. Satie was suspicious of music colleges, but Ravel advised Poulenc to take composition lessons; Milhaud suggested the composer and teacher Charles Koechlin. (Note: Koechlin, like Ravel, was a pupil of Gabriel Fauré, but Poulenc did not share their love of Fauré's music: the Fauré scholar Jean-Michel Nectoux comments that Poulenc's aversion seems strange because of all the members of Les Six, Poulenc "is the nearest to Fauré in the limpid clarity and singing quality of his own writing, in his charm".) Poulenc worked with him intermittently from 1921 to 1925.

=== 1920s: increasing fame ===
From the early 1920s Poulenc was well received abroad, particularly in Britain, both as a performer and a composer. In 1921 Ernest Newman wrote in The Manchester Guardian, "I keep my eye on Francis Poulenc, a young man who has only just arrived at his twenties. He ought to develop into a farceur of the first order." Newman said that he had rarely heard anything so deliciously absurd as parts of Poulenc's song cycle Cocardes, with its accompaniment played by the unorthodox combination of cornet, trombone, violin and percussion. In 1922 Poulenc and Milhaud travelled to Vienna to meet Alban Berg, Anton Webern and Arnold Schoenberg of the Second Viennese School. Neither of the French composers was influenced by their Austrian colleagues' revolutionary twelve-tone system, but they admired the three as its leading proponents. The following year Poulenc received a commission from Sergei Diaghilev for a full-length ballet score. He decided that the theme would be a modern version of the classical French fête galante. This work, Les biches, was an immediate success, first in Monte Carlo in January 1924 and then in Paris in May, under the direction of André Messager; it has remained one of Poulenc's best-known scores. Poulenc's new celebrity after the success of the ballet was the unexpected cause of his estrangement from Satie: among the new friends Poulenc made was Louis Laloy, a writer whom Satie regarded with implacable enmity. Auric, who had just enjoyed a similar triumph with a Diaghilev ballet, Les Fâcheux, was also repudiated by Satie for becoming a friend of Laloy.

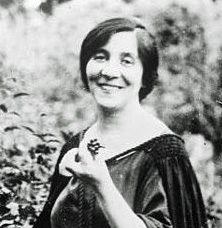
Wanda Landowska, friend and colleague from 1923

As the decade progressed, Poulenc produced a range of compositions, from songs to chamber music and another ballet, Aubade. Hell suggests that Koechlin's influence occasionally inhibited Poulenc's natural simple style, and that Auric offered useful guidance to help him appear in his true colours. At a concert of music by the two friends in 1926, Poulenc's songs were sung for the first time by the baritone Pierre Bernac, from whom, in Hell's phrase, "the name of Poulenc was soon to be inseparable." Another performer with whom the composer came to be closely associated was the harpsichordist Wanda Landowska. He heard her as the soloist in Falla's El retablo de maese Pedro (1923), an early example of the use of a harpsichord in a modern work, and was immediately taken with the sound. At Landowska's request he wrote a concerto, the Concert champêtre, which she premiered in 1929 with the Orchestre Symphonique de Paris conducted by Pierre Monteux.

The biographer Richard D. E. Burton comments that, in the late 1920s, Poulenc might have seemed to be in an enviable position: professionally successful and independently well-off, having inherited a substantial fortune from his father. He bought a large country house, Le Grand Coteau, at Noizay, Indre-et-Loire, 140 miles (230 km) south-west of Paris, where he retreated to compose in peaceful surroundings.

He began his first serious affair, with the painter Richard Chanlaire to whom he sent a copy of the Concert champêtre score inscribed:

You have changed my life, you are the sunshine of my thirty years, a reason for living and working.

While this affair was in progress Poulenc proposed marriage to his friend Raymonde Linossier. As she was not only well aware of his homosexuality but was also romantically attached elsewhere, she refused him, and their relationship became strained. He suffered the first of many periods of depression, which affected his ability to compose, and he was devastated in January 1930 when Linossier died suddenly at the age of 32. On her death he wrote, "All my youth departs with her, all that part of my life that belonged only to her. I sob ... I am now twenty years older". His affair with Chanlaire petered out in 1931, though they remained lifelong friends.

=== 1930s: new seriousness ===
At the start of the decade, Poulenc returned to writing songs, after a two-year break from doing so. His "Epitaphe", to a poem by Malherbe, was written in memory of Linossier, and is described by the pianist Graham Johnson as "a profound song in every sense". (Note: In addition to "Epitaphe", other Poulenc works were dedicated to Linossier or her memory are the Sonata for Horn, Trumpet and Trombone (1922), Ce doux petit visage (1939), Les Animaux modèles (1941) and "Voyage" from Calligrammes (1948).) The following year Poulenc wrote three sets of songs, to words by Apollinaire and Max Jacob, some of which were serious in tone, and others reminiscent of his earlier light-hearted style, as were others of his works of the early 1930s. In 1932 his music was among the first to be broadcast on television, in a transmission by the BBC in which Reginald Kell and Gilbert Vinter played his Sonata for clarinet and bassoon. At about this time Poulenc began a relationship with Raymond Destouches, a chauffeur; as with Chanlaire earlier, what began as a passionate affair changed into a deep and lasting friendship. Destouches, who married in the 1950s, remained close to Poulenc until the end of the composer's life.

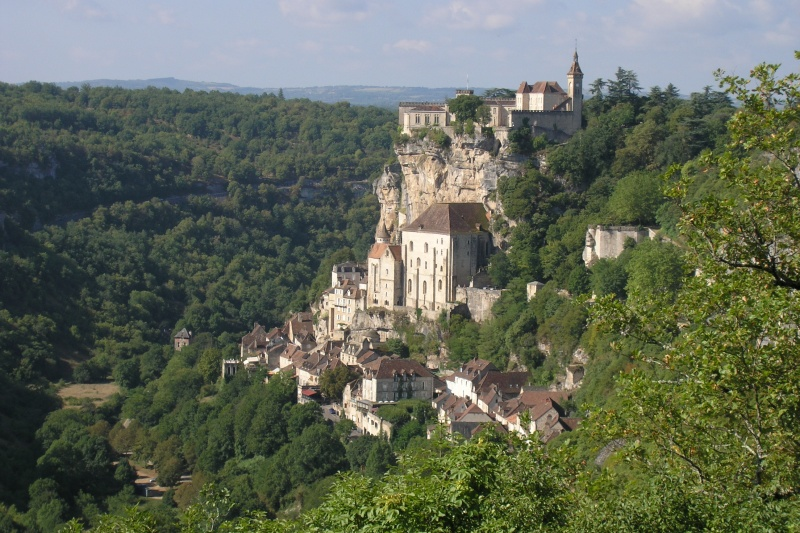
Rocamadour, which inspired Poulenc to compose religious works

Two unrelated events in 1936 combined to inspire a reawakening of religious faith and a new depth of seriousness in Poulenc's music. His fellow composer Pierre-Octave Ferroud was killed in a car crash so violent that he was decapitated, and almost immediately afterwards, while on holiday, Poulenc visited the sanctuary of Rocamadour. He later explained:

A few days earlier I'd just heard of the tragic death of my colleague ... As I meditated on the fragility of our human frame, I was drawn once more to the life of the spirit. Rocamadour had the effect of restoring me to the faith of my childhood. This sanctuary, undoubtedly the oldest in France ... had everything to captivate me ... The same evening of this visit to Rocamadour, I began my Litanies à la Vierge noire for female voices and organ. In that work I tried to get across the atmosphere of "peasant devotion" that had struck me so forcibly in that lofty chapel.

Other works that followed continued the composer's new-found seriousness, including many settings of Éluard's surrealist and humanist poems. In 1937 he composed his first major liturgical work, the Mass in G major for soprano and mixed choir a cappella, which has become the most frequently performed of all his sacred works. Poulenc's new compositions were not all in this serious vein; his incidental music to the play La Reine Margot, starring Yvonne Printemps, was pastiche 16th-century dance music, and became popular under the title Suite française. Music critics generally continued to define Poulenc by his light-hearted works, and it was not until the 1950s that his serious side was widely recognised.

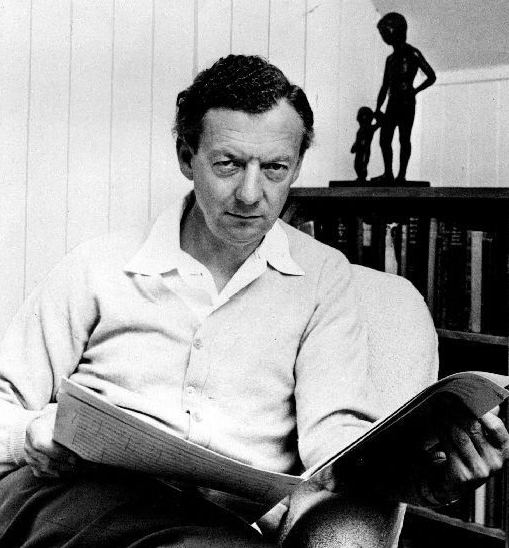
Benjamin Britten, friend and interpreter of Poulenc

In 1936 Poulenc began giving frequent recitals with Bernac. At the École Normale in Paris they gave the premiere of Poulenc's Cinq poèmes de Paul Éluard. They continued to perform together for more than twenty years, in Paris and internationally, until Bernac's retirement in 1959. Poulenc, who composed 90 songs for his collaborator, considered him one of the "three great meetings" of his professional career, the other two being Éluard and Landowska. (Note: Bernac's timbre and sensitive musicianship considerably influenced Poulenc's compositional style in his mélodies, to a degree comparable with the musical relationship between Poulenc's friends the tenor Peter Pears and the composer Benjamin Britten, although unlike their English counterparts Poulenc and Bernac were partners only professionally.) In Johnson's words, "for twenty-five years Bernac was Poulenc's counsellor and conscience", and the composer relied on him for advice not only on song-writing, but on his operas and choral music.

Throughout the decade, Poulenc was popular with British audiences; he established a fruitful relationship with the BBC in London, which broadcast many of his works. With Bernac, he made his first tour of Britain in 1938. His music was also popular in America, seen by many as "the quintessence of French wit, elegance and high spirits". In the last years of the 1930s, Poulenc's compositions continued to vary between serious and light-hearted works. Quatre motets pour un temps de pénitence (Four Penitential Motets, 1938–39) and the song "Bleuet" (1939), an elegiac meditation on death, contrast with the song cycle Fiançailles pour rire (Light-Hearted Betrothal), which recaptures the spirit of Les biches, in the opinion of Hell.

=== 1940s: war and post-war ===
Poulenc was briefly a soldier again during the Second World War; he was called up on 2 June 1940 and served in an anti-aircraft unit at Bordeaux. After France surrendered to Germany, Poulenc was demobilised from the army on 18 July 1940. He spent the summer of that year with family and friends at Brive-la-Gaillarde in south-central France. In the early months of the war, he had composed little new music, instead re-orchestrating Les biches and reworking his 1932 Sextet for piano and winds. At Brive-la-Gaillarde he began three new works, and once back at his home in Noizay in October he started on a fourth. These were L'Histoire de Babar, le petit éléphant for piano and narrator, the Cello Sonata, the ballet Les Animaux modèles and the song cycle Banalités.

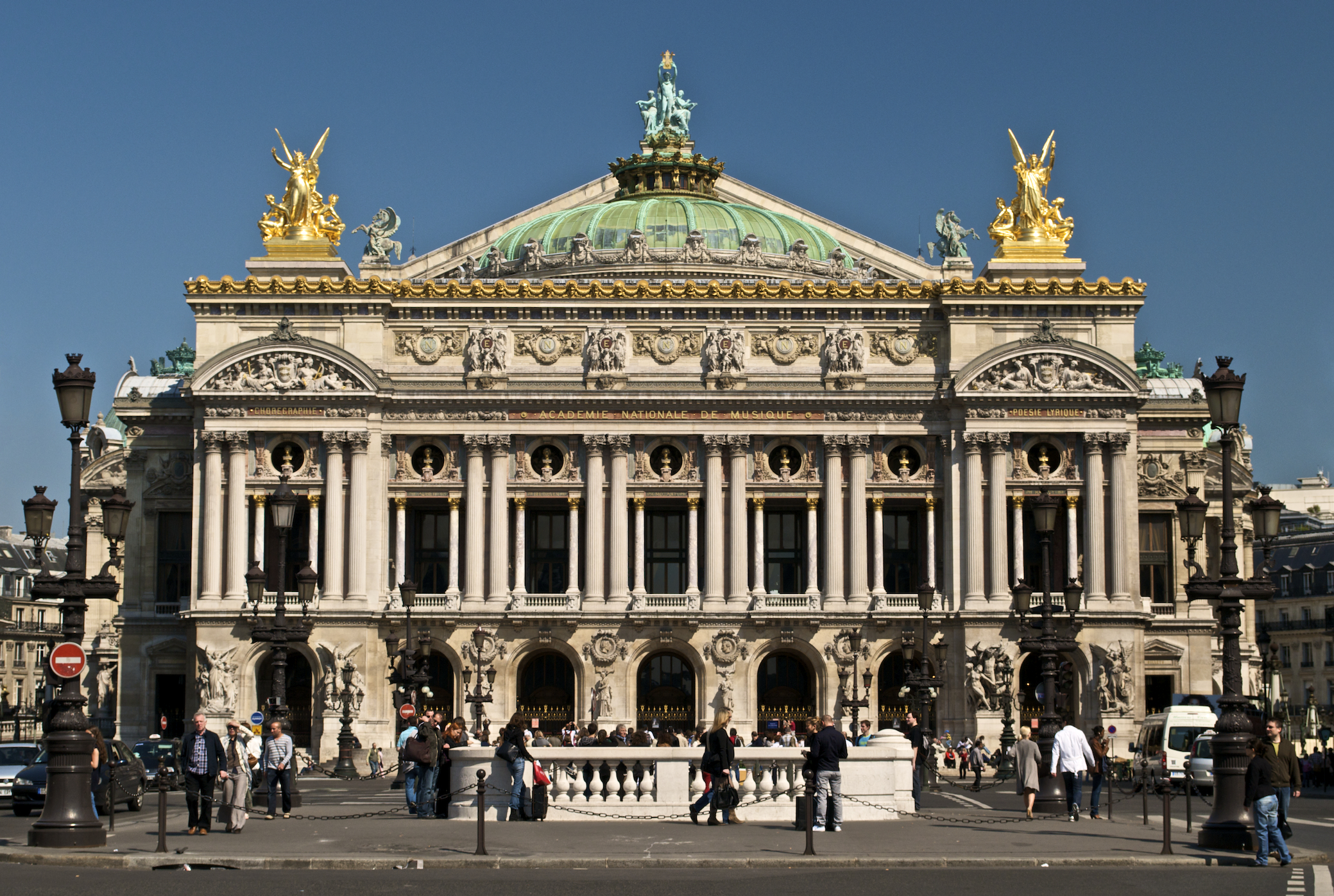
The Opéra, Paris, where Les Animaux modèles was premiered in 1942

For most of the war, Poulenc was in Paris, giving recitals with Bernac, concentrating on French songs. (Note: Poulenc recalled later that they performed only French songs, but his recollection was inaccurate: German songs, notably those of Schumann, were included in some programmes.) Under Nazi rule he was in a vulnerable position, as a known homosexual (Destouches narrowly avoided arrest and deportation), but in his music he made many gestures of defiance of the Germans. He set to music verses by poets prominent in the French Resistance, including Aragon and Éluard. In Les Animaux modèles, premiered at the Opéra in 1942, he included the tune, repeated several times, of the anti-German song "Vous n'aurez pas l'Alsace et la Lorraine". (Note: This song, "You shall not have Alsace and Lorraine", was a popular patriotic French ditty dating from the Franco-Prussian War, when the Germans defeated France and annexed much of Alsace and Lorraine. France regained them after the First World War, but at the time of Les Animaux modèles they were once again under German control.) He was a founder-member of the Front National (pour musique) which the Nazi authorities viewed with suspicion for its association with banned musicians such as Milhaud and Paul Hindemith. In 1943 he wrote a cantata for unaccompanied double choir intended for Belgium, Figure humaine, setting eight of Éluard's poems. The work, ending with "Liberté", could not be given in France while the Germans were in control; its first performance was broadcast from a BBC studio in London in March 1945, and it was not sung in Paris until 1947. The music critic of The Times later wrote that the work "is among the very finest choral works of our time and in itself removes Poulenc from the category of petit maître to which ignorance has generally been content to relegate him."

Poulenc also composed the music for Jean Anouilh's 1944 film Le Voyageur sans bagage. Following the loss of the original orchestral score, Antony Gray reconstructed the music from the surviving film soundtrack. Gray's reconstruction was recorded in Prague in October 2026 by the Prague Metropolitan Orchestra, conducted by Shea Lolin.

In January 1945, commissioned by the French government, Poulenc and Bernac flew from Paris to London, where they received an enthusiastic welcome. The London Philharmonic Orchestra gave a reception in the composer's honour; he and Benjamin Britten were the soloists in a performance of Poulenc's Double Piano Concerto at the Royal Albert Hall; with Bernac he gave recitals of French mélodies and piano works at the Wigmore Hall and the National Gallery, and recorded for the BBC. Bernac was overwhelmed by the public's response; when he and Poulenc stepped out on the Wigmore Hall stage, "the audience rose and my emotion was such that instead of beginning to sing, I began to weep." After their fortnight's stay, the two returned home on the first boat-train to leave London for Paris since May 1940.

In Paris, Poulenc completed his scores for L'Histoire de Babar, le petit éléphant and his first opera, Les mamelles de Tirésias (The Breasts of Tiresias), a short opéra bouffe of about an hour's duration. The work is a setting of Apollinaire's play of the same name, staged in 1917. Sams describes the opera as "high-spirited topsy-turveydom" concealing "a deeper and sadder theme – the need to repopulate and rediscover a France ravaged by war". It was premiered in June 1947 at the Opéra-Comique, and was a critical success, but did not prove popular with the public. (Note: The piece was not produced in the US until 1953, and did not reach Britain until 1958, when Britten and Pears presented it at the Aldeburgh Festival. It remains by a considerable margin the least popular of Poulenc's three operas; Dialogues des Carmélites and La Voix humaine each received more than four times as many productions worldwide between 2012 and 2014.) The leading female role was taken by Denise Duval, who became the composer's favourite soprano, frequent recital partner and dedicatee of some of his music. He called her the nightingale who made him cry ("Mon rossignol à larmes").

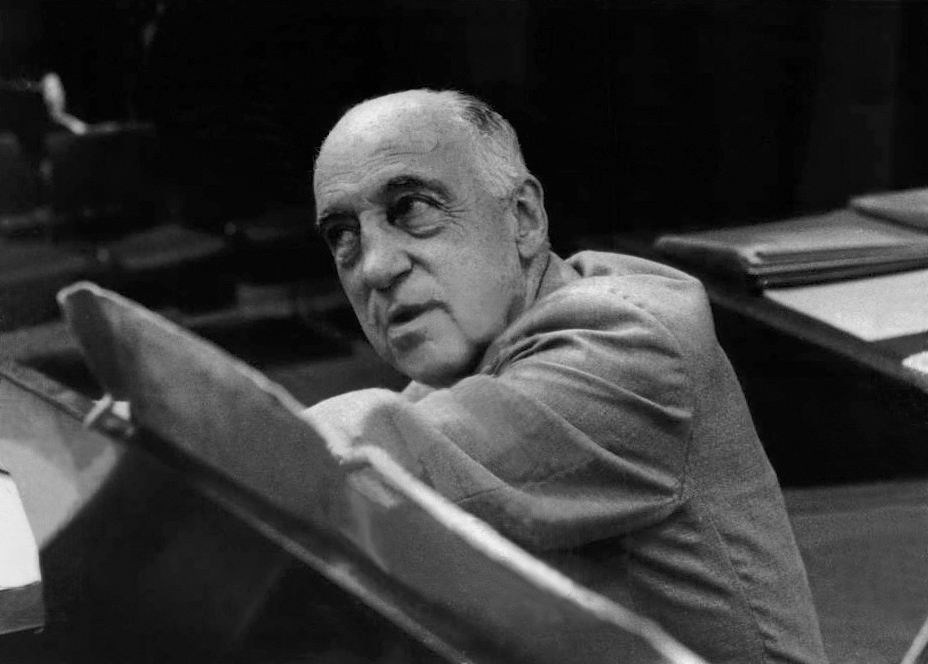
Pierre Bernac in 1968

Shortly after the war, Poulenc had a brief affair with a woman, Fréderique ("Freddy") Lebedeff, with whom he had a daughter, Marie-Ange, in 1946. The child was brought up without knowing who her father was (Poulenc was supposedly her "godfather") but he made generous provision for her, and she was the principal beneficiary of his will.

In the post-war period Poulenc crossed swords with composers of the younger generation who rejected Stravinsky's recent work and insisted that only the precepts of the Second Viennese School were valid. Poulenc defended Stravinsky and expressed incredulity that "in 1945 we are speaking as if the aesthetic of twelve tones is the only possible salvation for contemporary music". His view that Berg had taken serialism as far as it could go and that Schoenberg's music was now "desert, stone soup, ersatz music, or poetic vitamins" earned him the enmity of composers such as Pierre Boulez. (Note: Despite their musical differences, Poulenc and Boulez maintained amicable personal relations: exchanges of friendly letters are recorded in Poulenc's published correspondence.) Those disagreeing with Poulenc attempted to paint him as a relic of the pre-war era, frivolous and unprogressive. This led him to focus on his more serious works, and to try to persuade the French public to listen to them. In the US and Britain, with their strong choral traditions, his religious music was frequently performed, but performances in France were much rarer, so that the public and the critics were often unaware of his serious compositions. (Note: In 1949, thrilled by a new American recording of his 1936 Mass conducted by Robert Shaw, Poulenc exclaimed, "At last the world will know that I am a serious composer.)

In 1948 Poulenc made his first visit to the US, in a two-month concert tour with Bernac. He returned there frequently until 1961, giving recitals with Bernac or Duval and as soloist in the world premiere of his Piano Concerto (1949), commissioned by the Boston Symphony Orchestra.

=== 1950–63: The Carmelites and last years ===
Poulenc began the 1950s with a new partner in his private life, Lucien Roubert, a travelling salesman. Professionally Poulenc was productive, writing a seven-song cycle setting poems by Éluard, La Fraîcheur et le feu (1950), and the Stabat Mater, in memory of the painter Christian Bérard, composed in 1950 and premiered the following year.

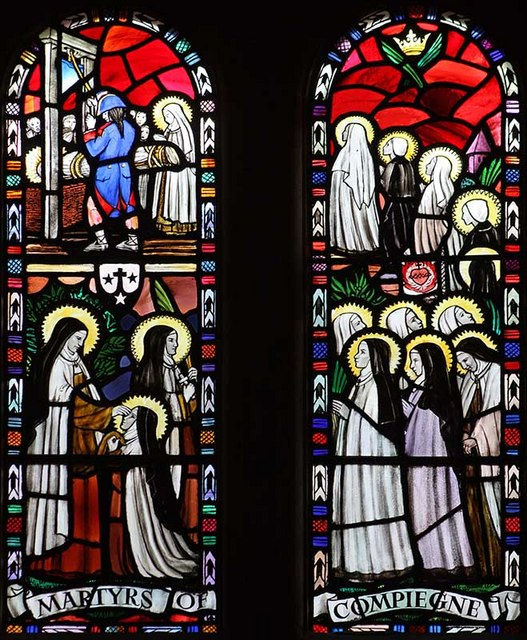
The Martyrs of Compiègne

In 1953, Poulenc was offered a commission by La Scala and the Milanese publisher Casa Ricordi for a ballet. He considered the story of St Margaret of Cortona but found a dance version of her life impracticable. He preferred to write an opera on a religious theme; Ricordi suggested Dialogues des Carmélites, an unfilmed screenplay by Georges Bernanos. The text, based on a short story by Gertrud von Le Fort, depicts the Martyrs of Compiègne, nuns guillotined during the French Revolution for their religious beliefs. Poulenc found it "such a moving and noble work", ideal for his libretto, and he began composition in August 1953.

During the composition of the opera, Poulenc suffered two blows. He learned of a dispute between Bernanos's estate and the writer Emmet Lavery, who held the rights to theatrical adaptations of Le Fort's novel; this caused Poulenc to stop work on his opera. At about the same time Roubert became gravely ill. (Note: The illness is variously reported as pleurisy and lung cancer.) Intense worry pushed Poulenc into a nervous breakdown, and in November 1954 he was in a clinic at L'Haÿ-les-Roses, outside Paris, heavily sedated. When he recovered, and the literary rights and royalty payments disputes with Lavery were settled, he resumed work on Dialogues des Carmélites in between extensive touring with Bernac in England. As his personal wealth had declined since the 1920s he required the substantial income earned from his recitals.

While working on the opera, Poulenc composed little else; exceptions were two mélodies, and a short orchestral movement, "Bucolique" in a collective work, Variations sur le nom de Marguerite Long (1954), to which his old friends from Les Six Auric and Milhaud also contributed. As Poulenc was writing the last pages of his opera in October 1955, Roubert died at the age of forty-seven. The composer wrote to a friend, "Lucien was delivered from his martyrdom ten days ago and the final copy of Les Carmélites was completed (take note) at the very moment my dear breathed his last."

The opera was first given in January 1957 at La Scala in Italian translation. Between then and the French premiere Poulenc introduced one of his most popular late works, the Flute Sonata, which he and Jean-Pierre Rampal performed in June at the Strasbourg Music Festival. Three days later, on 21 June, came the Paris premiere of Dialogues des Carmélites at the Opéra. It was a tremendous success, to the composer's considerable relief. At around this time Poulenc began his last romantic relationship, with Louis Gautier, a former soldier; they remained partners to the end of Poulenc's life.

It's not that I'm consumed by the idea of being a grrrrreat musician, (Note: "grrrrrande" in Poulenc's original French) but all the same it has exasperated me to be, for so many people, simply an erotic petit maître. ... From the Stabat Mater to La Voix humaine I must say that it hasn't been all that amusing.

— Poulenc in a 1959 letter

In 1958 Poulenc embarked on a collaboration with his old friend Cocteau, in an operatic version of the latter's 1930 monodrama La Voix humaine. (Note: There was a joke in musical circles at the time that Poulenc was writing his solo opera for Maria Callas, who was known for her reluctance to share the spotlight with anybody, but in fact there was never any thought that Callas, or anyone apart from Duval, should play the lead.) The work was produced in February 1959 at the Opéra-Comique, under Cocteau's direction, with Duval as the tragic deserted woman speaking to her former lover by telephone. In May Poulenc's 60th birthday was marked, a few months late, by his last concert with Bernac before the latter's retirement from public performance.

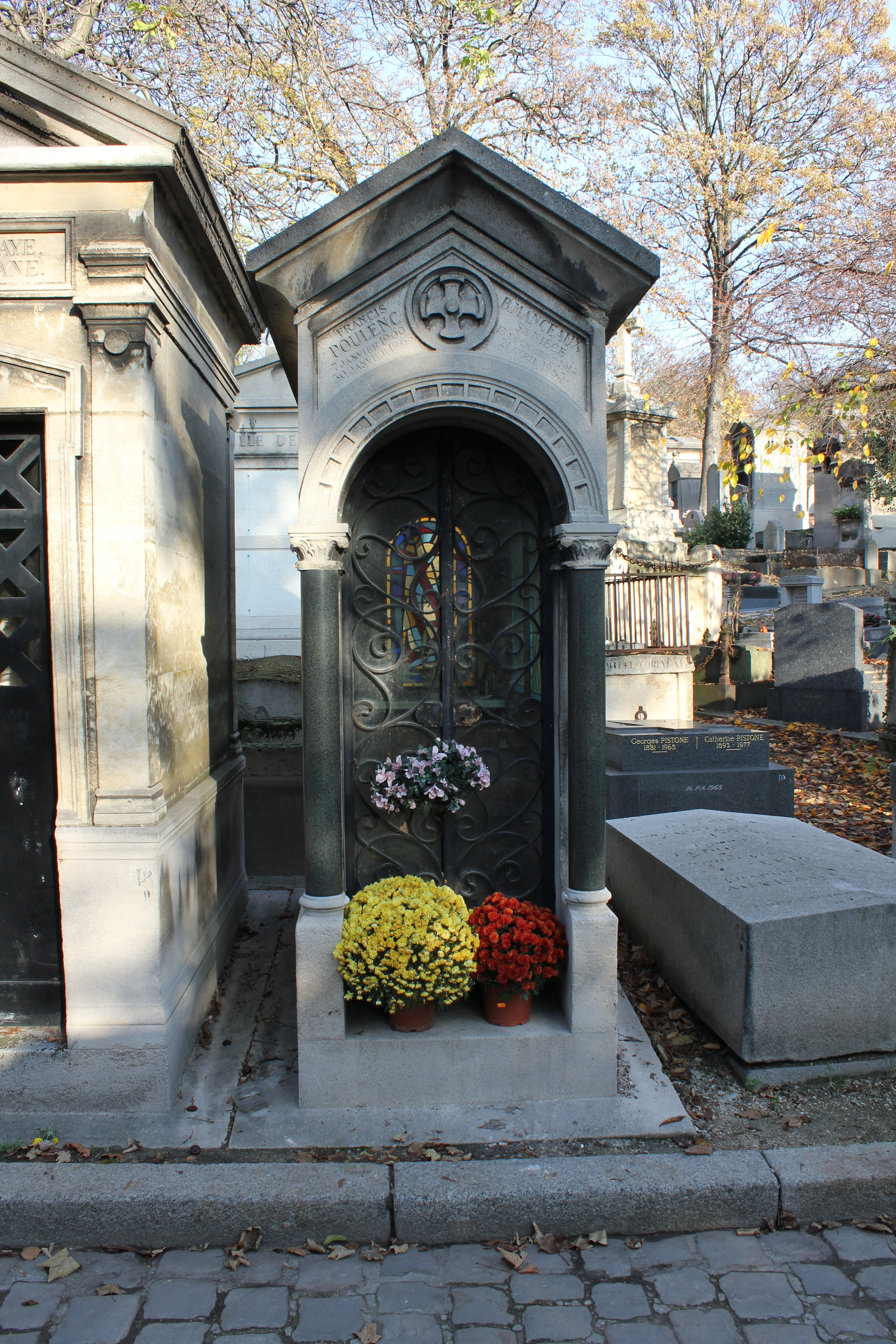
Poulenc's grave at Père Lachaise Cemetery (Note: The year of the composer's birth is incised as 1900, rather than 1899.)

Poulenc visited the US in 1960 and 1961. Among his works given during these trips were the American premiere of La Voix humaine at Carnegie Hall in New York, with Duval, and the world premiere of his Gloria, a large-scale work for soprano, four-part mixed chorus and orchestra, conducted in Boston by Charles Munch. In 1961 Poulenc published a book about Emmanuel Chabrier, a 187-page study of which a reviewer wrote in the 1980s, "he writes with love and insight of a composer whose views he shared on matters like the primacy of melody and the essential seriousness of humour." The works of Poulenc's last twelve months included Sept répons des ténèbres for voices and orchestra, the Clarinet Sonata and the Oboe Sonata.

On 30 January 1963, at his flat opposite the Jardin du Luxembourg, Poulenc suffered a fatal heart attack. His funeral was at the nearby church of Saint-Sulpice. In accordance with his wishes, none of his music was performed; Marcel Dupré, the church's titular organist, played works by Johann Sebastian Bach on its grand organ. Poulenc was buried at Père Lachaise Cemetery, alongside his family.

== Music ==
Poulenc's music is essentially diatonic. In Henri Hell's view, this is because the main feature of Poulenc's musical art is his melodic gift. In the words of Roger Nichols in the Grove dictionary, "For [Poulenc] the most important element of all was melody and he found his way to a vast treasury of undiscovered tunes within an area that had, according to the most up-to-date musical maps, been surveyed, worked and exhausted." The commentator George Keck writes, "His melodies are simple, pleasing, easily remembered, and most often emotionally expressive."

Poulenc said that he was not inventive in his harmonic language. The composer Lennox Berkeley wrote of him, "All through his life, he was content to use conventional harmony, but his use of it was so individual, so immediately recognizable as his own, that it gave his music freshness and validity." Keck considers Poulenc's harmonic language "as beautiful, interesting and personal as his melodic writing ... clear, simple harmonies moving in obviously defined tonal areas with chromaticism that is rarely more than passing". Poulenc had no time for musical theories; in one of his many radio interviews he called for "a truce to composing by theory, doctrine, rule!" He was dismissive of what he saw as the dogmatism of latter-day adherents to dodecaphony, led by René Leibowitz, and greatly regretted that the adoption of a theoretical approach had affected the music of Olivier Messiaen, of whom he had earlier had high hopes. (Note: In a letter to Milhaud in 1950 Poulenc, who had earlier singled out Messiaen as one of France's most promising young composers, privately compared Messiaen's recent compositions to "holy water out of a bidet".) To Hell, almost all Poulenc's music is "directly or indirectly inspired by the purely melodic associations of the human voice". Poulenc was a painstaking craftsman, though a myth grew up – "la légende de facilité" – that his music came easily to him; he commented, "The myth is excusable, since I do everything to conceal my efforts."

The pianist Pascal Rogé commented in 1999 that both sides of Poulenc's musical nature were equally important: "You must accept him as a whole. If you take away either part, the serious or the non-serious, you destroy him. If one part is erased you get only a pale photocopy of what he really is." Poulenc recognised the dichotomy, but in all his works he wanted music that was "healthy, clear and robust – music as frankly French as Stravinsky's is Slav". (Note: "Je souhaite une musique saine, claire et robuste, une musique aussi franchement française que celle de Strawinsky est slave.")

=== Film music ===
Poulenc's film scores include La Belle au bois dormant (1935), La Duchesse de Langeais (1942), Le Voyageur sans bagage (1944) and Le Voyage en Amérique (1951). He also collaborated with Georges Auric on the music for Ce siècle a cinquante ans (1950).

La Belle au bois dormant was written for a six-minute animated advertising film by Alexandre Alexeieff for the wine merchant Nicolas. Poulenc played the harpsichord in the original recording, which used a small ensemble dominated by wind instruments. The score was subsequently reconstructed by Paul Cott.

Poulenc composed the music for Jean Anouilh's Le Voyageur sans bagage, released in 1944. Following the loss of the original orchestral score, Antony Gray reconstructed the music from the surviving film soundtrack. His reconstruction was recorded in Prague in October 2026 by the Prague Metropolitan Orchestra, conducted by Shea Lolin.

=== Orchestral and concertante ===
Influences on Poulenc: from top left clockwise, Johann Sebastian Bach, Wolfgang Amadeus Mozart, Franz Schubert and Emmanuel Chabrier

Poulenc's principal works for large orchestra comprise three ballets, a Sinfonietta and four keyboard concerti. The first of the ballets, Les biches, was first performed in 1924 and remains one of his best-known works. Nichols writes in Grove that the clear and tuneful score has no deep, or even shallow, symbolism, a fact "accentuated by a tiny passage of mock-Wagnerian brass, complete with emotive minor 9ths".

The first two of the four concerti are in Poulenc's lighthearted vein. The Concert champêtre for harpsichord and orchestra (1927–28), evokes the countryside seen from a Parisian point of view: Nichols comments that the fanfares in the last movement bring to mind the bugles in the barracks of Vincennes in the Paris suburbs. The Concerto for two pianos and orchestra (1932) is similarly a work intended purely to entertain. It draws on a variety of stylistic sources: the first movement ends in a manner reminiscent of Balinese gamelan, and the slow movement begins in a Mozartian style, which Poulenc gradually fills out with his own characteristic personal touches. The Organ Concerto (1938) is in a much more serious vein. Poulenc said that it was "on the outskirts" of his religious music, and there are passages that draw on the church music of Bach, though there are also interludes in breezy popular style.

The second ballet score, Les Animaux modèles (1941), has never equalled the popularity of Les biches, though both Auric and Honegger praised the composer's harmonic flair and resourceful orchestration. Honegger wrote, "The influences that have worked on him, Chabrier, Satie, Stravinsky, are now completely assimilated. Listening to his music you think – it's Poulenc." The Sinfonietta (1947) is a reversion to Poulenc's pre-war frivolity. He came to feel, "I dressed too young for my age ... [it] is a new version of Les biches but young girls [biches] that are forty-eight years old – that's horrible!" The Concerto for piano and orchestra (1949) initially caused some disappointment: many felt that it was not an advance on Poulenc's pre-war music, a view he came to share. The piece has been re-evaluated in more recent years, and in 1996 the writer Claire Delamarche rated it as the composer's finest concertante work.

=== Piano ===
Portrait of Poulenc by Jacques-Émile Blanche, 1920

Poulenc, a highly accomplished pianist, usually composed at the piano and wrote many pieces for the instrument throughout his career. In Henri Hell's view, Poulenc's piano writing can be divided into the percussive and the gentler style reminiscent of the harpsichord. Hell considers that the finest of Poulenc's music for piano is in the accompaniments to the songs, a view shared by Poulenc himself. The vast majority of the piano works are, in the view of the writer Keith W Daniel, "what might be called 'miniatures'". Looking back at his piano music in the 1950s, the composer viewed it critically: "I tolerate the Mouvements perpétuels, my old Suite en ut [in C], and the Trois pieces. I like very much my two collections of Improvisations, an Intermezzo in A flat, and certain Nocturnes. I condemn Napoli and the Soirées de Nazelles without reprieve."

Of the pieces cited with approval by Poulenc, the fifteen Improvisations were composed at intervals between 1932 and 1959. (Note: At the time of Poulenc's comments there were only twelve: the first set, numbers 1–10, date from the 1920s and the second set, numbers 11 and 12, from the 1930s; numbers 13–15 were written in 1958–59.) All are brief: the longest lasts a little more than three minutes. They vary from swift and balletic to tender lyricism, old-fashioned march, perpetuum mobile, waltz and a poignant musical portrait of the singer Édith Piaf. Poulenc's favoured Intermezzo was the last of three. Numbers one and two were composed in August 1934; the A flat followed in March 1943. The commentators Marina and Victor Ledin describe the work as "the embodiment of the word 'charming'. The music seems simply to roll off the pages, each sound following another in such an honest and natural way, with eloquence and unmistakable Frenchness." The eight nocturnes were composed across nearly a decade (1929–38). Whether or not Poulenc originally conceived them as an integral set, he gave the eighth the title "To serve as Coda for the Cycle" (Pour servir de Coda au Cycle). Although they share their generic title with the nocturnes of Field, Chopin and Fauré, Poulenc's do not resemble those of the earlier composers, being "night-scenes and sound-images of public and private events" rather than romantic tone poems.

The pieces Poulenc found merely tolerable were all early works: Trois mouvements perpétuels dates from 1919, the Suite in C from 1920 and the Trois pièces from 1928. All consist of short sections, the longest being the "Hymne", the second of the three 1928 pieces, which lasts about four minutes. Of the two works their composer singled out for censure, Napoli (1925) is a three-movement portrait of Italy, and Les Soirées de Nazelles is described by the composer Geoffrey Bush as "the French equivalent of Elgar's Enigma Variations" – miniature character sketches of his friends. Despite Poulenc's scorn for the work, Bush judges it ingenious and witty. Among the piano music not mentioned, favourably or harshly, by Poulenc, the best known pieces include the two Novelettes (1927–28), the set of six miniatures for children, Villageoises (1933), a piano version of the seven-movement Suite française (1935), and L'embarquement pour Cythère for two pianos (1953).

=== Chamber ===
In Grove, Nichols divides the chamber works into three clearly differentiated periods. The first four sonatas come from the early group, all written before Poulenc was twenty-two. These sonatas are scored for two clarinets (1918), piano duo (1918), clarinet and bassoon (1922) and horn, trumpet and trombone (1922). They are early examples of Poulenc's many and varied influences, with echoes of rococo divertissements alongside unconventional harmonies, some influenced by jazz. All four are characterised by their brevity – less than ten minutes each – their mischievousness and their wit, which Nichols describes as acid. Other chamber works from this period are the Rapsodie nègre, FP 3, from 1917 (mainly instrumental, with brief vocal episodes) and the Trio for oboe, bassoon and piano (1926).

The chamber works of Poulenc's middle period were written in the 1930s and 1940s. The best known is the Sextet for Piano and Wind (1932), in Poulenc's light-hearted vein, consisting of two lively outer movements and a central divertimento, this was one of several chamber works that the composer became dissatisfied with and revised extensively some years after their first performance (in this case in 1939–40). (Note: The List of compositions by Francis Poulenc gives dates for the major revisions) The sonatas in this group are for violin and piano (1942–43) and for cello and piano (1948). Writing for strings did not come easily to Poulenc; these sonatas were completed after two unsuccessful earlier attempts, (Note: An early violin sonata was performed at a Huyghens concert in 1919 but it was unpublished and is now lost.) and in 1947 he destroyed the draft of a string quartet. (Note: Hell notes that Poulenc reused some of the themes in his 1947 Sinfonietta.) Both sonatas are predominantly grave in character; that for violin is dedicated to the memory of Federico García Lorca. Commentators including Hell, Schmidt and Poulenc himself have regarded it, and to some extent the cello sonata, as less effective than those for wind. The Aubade, "Concerto choréographique" for piano and 18 instruments (1930) achieves an almost orchestral effect, despite its modest number of players. (Note: Hell lists the piece under the separate heading of "Works for Chamber Orchestra" along with the occasional work Two Marches and an Intermezzo (1937).) The other chamber works from this period are arrangements for small ensembles of two works in Poulenc's lightest vein, the Suite française (1935) and the Trois mouvements perpétuels (1946).

The final three sonatas are for woodwind and piano: for flute (1956–57), clarinet (1962), and oboe (1962). They have, according to Grove, become fixtures in their repertoires because of "their technical expertise and of their profound beauty". The Élégie for horn and piano (1957) was composed in memory of the horn player Dennis Brain. It contains one of Poulenc's rare excursions into dodecaphony, with the brief employment of a twelve-note tone row.

=== Songs ===
Guillaume Apollinaire, whose poems Poulenc frequently set

Poulenc composed songs throughout his career, and his output in the genre is extensive. (Note: A 2013 CD set of the complete songs occupies four full discs and plays for more than five hours in total.) In Johnson's view, most of the finest were written in the 1930s and 1940s. Though widely varied in character, the songs are dominated by Poulenc's preference for certain poets. From the outset of his career he favoured verses by Guillaume Apollinaire, and from the mid-1930s the writer whose work he set most often was Paul Éluard. Other poets whose works he frequently set included Jean Cocteau, Max Jacob, and Louise de Vilmorin. In the view of the music critic Andrew Clements, the Éluard songs include many of Poulenc's greatest settings; Johnson calls the cycle Tel Jour, Telle Nuit (1937) the composer's "watershed work", and Nichols regards it as "a masterpiece worthy to stand beside Fauré's La Bonne Chanson". Clements finds in the Éluard settings a profundity "worlds away from the brittle, facetious surfaces of Poulenc's early orchestral and instrumental music". The first of the Deux poèmes de Louis Aragon (1943), titled simply "C", is described by Johnson as "a masterpiece known the world over; it is the most unusual, and perhaps the most moving, song about the ravages of war ever composed."

In an overview of the songs in 1973, the musical scholar Yvonne Gouverné said, "With Poulenc, the melodic line matches the text so well that it seems in some way to complete it, thanks to the gift which the music has for penetrating the very essence of a given poem; nobody has better crafted a phrase than Poulenc, highlighting the colour of the words." Among the lighter pieces, one of the composer's most popular songs is a setting of Les Chemins de l'amour for Jean Anouilh's 1940 play as a Parisian waltz; by contrast his "monologue" "La Dame de Monte Carlo", (1961) a depiction of an elderly woman addicted to gambling, shows the composer's painful understanding of the horrors of depression.

=== Choral ===
Apart from a single early work for unaccompanied choir ("Chanson à boire", 1922), Poulenc began writing choral music in 1936. In that year he produced three works for choir: Sept chansons (settings of verses by Éluard and others), Petites voix (for children's voices), and his religious work Litanies à la Vierge Noire, for female or children's voices and organ. The Mass in G major (1937) for unaccompanied choir is described by Gouverné as having something of a baroque style, with "vitality and joyful clamour on which his faith is writ large". Poulenc's new-found religious theme continued with Quatre motets pour un temps de pénitence (1938–39), but among his most important choral works is the secular cantata Figure humaine (1943). Like the Mass, it is unaccompanied, and to succeed in performance it requires singers of the highest quality. Other a cappella works include the Quatre motets pour le temps de Noël (1952), which make severe demands on choirs' rhythmic precision and intonation.

Poulenc's major works for choir and orchestra are the Stabat Mater (1950), the Gloria (1959–60), and Sept répons des ténèbres (Seven responsories for Tenebrae, 1961–62). All these works are based on liturgical texts, originally set to Gregorian chant. In the Gloria, Poulenc's faith expresses itself in an exuberant, joyful way, with intervals of prayerful calm and mystic feeling, and an ending of serene tranquillity. Poulenc wrote to Bernac in 1962, "I have finished Les Ténèbres. I think it is beautiful. With the Gloria and the Stabat Mater, I think I have three good religious works. May they spare me a few days in Purgatory, if I narrowly avoid going to hell." Sept répons des ténèbres, which Poulenc did not live to hear performed, uses a large orchestra, but in Nichols's view it displays a new concentration of thought. To the critic Ralph Thibodeau, the work may be considered as Poulenc's own requiem and is "the most avant-garde of his sacred compositions, the most emotionally demanding, and the most interesting musically, comparable only with his magnum opus sacrum, the opera, Dialogues des Carmélites."

=== Opera ===
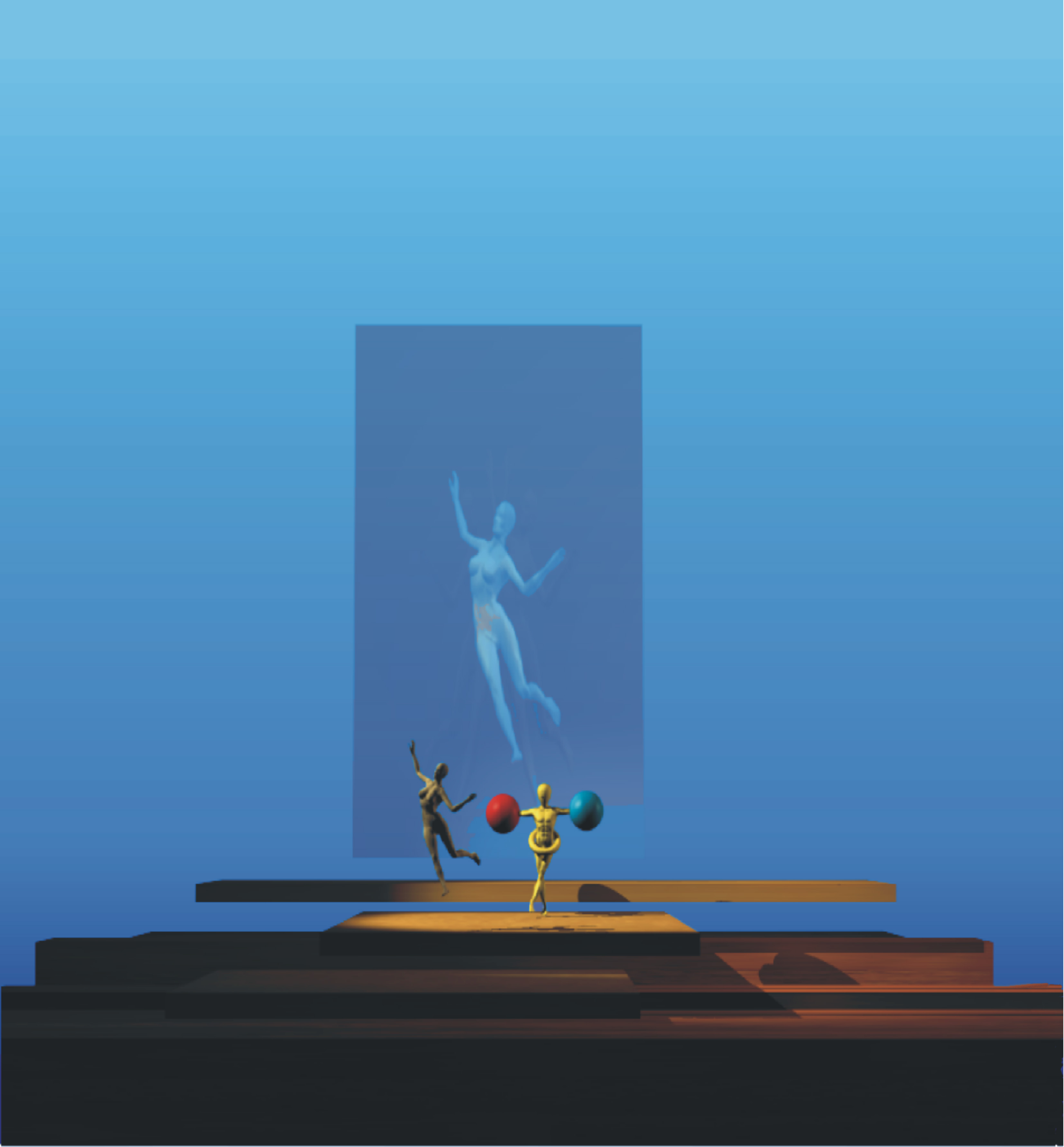
Design by Sylvain Lhermitte for Les mamelles de Tirésias

Poulenc turned to opera only in the latter half of his career. Having achieved fame by his early twenties, he was in his forties before attempting his first opera. He attributed this to the need for maturity before tackling the subjects he chose to set. In 1958 he told an interviewer, "When I was 24 I was able to write Les biches [but] it is obvious that unless a composer of 30 has the genius of a Mozart or the precociousness of Schubert he couldn't write The Carmelites – the problems are too profound." In Sams's view, all three of Poulenc's operas display a depth of feeling far distant from "the cynical stylist of the 1920s": Les Mamelles de Tirésias (1947), despite the riotous plot, is full of nostalgia and a sense of loss. In the two avowedly serious operas, Dialogues des Carmélites (1957) and La Voix humaine (1959), in which Poulenc depicts deep human suffering, Sams sees a reflection of the composer's own struggles with depression.

In terms of musical technique the operas show how far Poulenc had come from his naïve and insecure beginnings. Nichols comments in Grove that Les mamelles de Tirésias, deploys "lyrical solos, patter duets, chorales, falsetto lines for tenor and bass babies and ... succeeds in being both funny and beautiful". In all three operas Poulenc drew on earlier composers, while blending their influence into music unmistakably his own. In the printed score of Dialogues des Carmélites he acknowledged his debt to Modest Mussorgsky, Claudio Monteverdi, Debussy and Giuseppe Verdi. The critic Renaud Machart writes that Dialogues des Carmélites is, with Britten's Peter Grimes, one of the extremely rare operas written since the Second World War to appear on opera programmes all over the world.

Even when he wrote for a large orchestra, Poulenc used the full forces sparingly in his operas, often scoring for woodwinds or brass or strings alone. With the invaluable input of Bernac he showed great skill in writing for the human voice, fitting the music to the tessitura of each character. By the time of the last of the operas, La Voix humaine, Poulenc felt able to give the soprano stretches of music with no orchestral accompaniment at all, though when the orchestra plays, Poulenc calls for the music to be "bathed in sensuality".

=== Recordings ===
Poulenc was among the composers who in the 1920s recognised the important role that the gramophone would play in the promotion of music. The first recording of his music, made for French Columbia in March 1928, was a performance of the trio for oboe, bassoon, and piano, in which the composer on the piano was joined by Roland Lamorlette (oboe) and Gustave Dhérin (bassoon); in the same year he also recorded the Trois mouvements perpétuels and piano transcriptions of two excerpts from Les biches, and accompanied mezzo-soprano Claire Croiza in his song cycle La bestiaire. He subsequently made numerous recordings, mainly for the French division of EMI. With Bernac and Duval he recorded many of his own songs, and those of other composers including Chabrier, Debussy, Charles Gounod and Ravel. He played the piano part in recordings of his Babar the Elephant with Pierre Fresnay and Noël Coward as narrators. In 2005, EMI issued a DVD, "Francis Poulenc & Friends", featuring filmed performances of Poulenc's music, played by the composer, with Duval, Rampal, Jacques Février and Georges Prêtre.

A 1984 discography of Poulenc's music lists recordings by more than 1,300 conductors, soloists and ensembles, including the conductors Leonard Bernstein, Charles Dutoit, Milhaud, Charles Munch, Eugene Ormandy, Prêtre, André Previn and Leopold Stokowski. Among the singers, in addition to Bernac and Duval, the list includes Régine Crespin, Dietrich Fischer-Dieskau, Nicolai Gedda, Peter Pears, Yvonne Printemps and Gérard Souzay. Instrumental soloists include Britten, Jacques Février, Pierre Fournier, Emil Gilels, Yehudi Menuhin and Arthur Rubinstein.

Complete sets of Poulenc's solo piano music have been recorded by Gabriel Tacchino, who had been Poulenc's only piano student (released on the EMI label), Pascal Rogé (Decca), Paul Crossley (CBS), Eric Parkin (Chandos). Éric Le Sage (RCA) and Olivier Cazal (Naxos). Integral sets of the chamber music have been recorded by the Nash Ensemble (Hyperion), Éric Le Sage and various French soloists (RCA) and a variety of young French musicians (Naxos).

The world premiere of Dialogues des Carmélites (in Italian, as Dialoghi delle Carmelitane) was recorded and has been released on CD. The first studio recording was soon after the French premiere, and since then there have been at least ten live or studio recordings on CD or DVD, most of them in French but one in German and one in English.

== Reputation ==
The two sides to Poulenc's musical nature caused misunderstanding during his life and have continued to do so. The composer Ned Rorem observed, "He was deeply devout and uncontrollably sensual"; this still leads some critics to underrate his seriousness. His uncompromising adherence to melody, both in his lighter and serious works, has similarly caused some to regard him as unprogressive. Although he was not much influenced by new developments in music, Poulenc was always keenly interested in the works of younger generations of composers. Lennox Berkeley recalled, "Unlike some artists, he was genuinely interested in other people's work, and surprisingly appreciative of music very far removed from his. I remember him playing me the records of Boulez's Le marteau sans maître with which he was already familiar when that work was much less well-known than it is today." Boulez did not take a reciprocal view, remarking in 2010, "There are always people who will take an easy intellectual path. Poulenc coming after Sacre [du Printemps]. It was not progress." Other composers have found more merit in Poulenc's work; Stravinsky wrote to him in 1931: "You are truly good, and that is what I find again and again in your music".

In his last years Poulenc observed, "if people are still interested in my music in 50 years' time it will be for my Stabat Mater rather than the Mouvements perpétuels." In a centenary tribute in The Times Gerald Larner commented that Poulenc's prediction was wrong, and that in 1999 the composer was widely celebrated for both sides of his musical character: "both the fervent Catholic and the naughty boy, for both the Gloria and Les Biches, both Les Dialogues des Carmélites and Les Mamelles de Tirésias." At around the same time the writer Jessica Duchen described Poulenc as "a fizzing, bubbling mass of Gallic energy who can move you to both laughter and tears within seconds. His language speaks clearly, directly and humanely to every generation."

== Notes, references and sources ==
=== Sources ===
- Bloch, Francine (1984). Francis Poulenc, 1928–1982: Phonographie (in French). Paris: Bibliothèque nationale, Département de la phonothèque nationale et de l'audiovisuel. ISBN 978-2-7177-1677-1.
- Buckland, Sidney; Myriam Chimènes, eds. (1999). Poulenc: Music, Art and Literature. Aldershot: Ashgate. ISBN 978-1-85928-407-0.
- Burton, Richard D E (2002). Francis Poulenc. Bath: Absolute Press. ISBN 978-1-899791-09-5.
- Bush, Geoffrey (1988). Notes to CD set Poulenc – Works for Piano. Colchester: Chandos. OCLC 705329248.
- Canarina, John (2003). Pierre Monteux, Maître. Pompton Plains, US: Amadeus Press. ISBN 978-1-57467-082-0.
- Cayez, Pierre (1988). Rhône-Poulenc, 1895–1975 (in French). Paris: Armand Colin and Masson. ISBN 978-2-200-37146-3.
- Chimènes, Myriam (2001). "Évolution des goûts de Francis Poulenc à travers sa correspondance". In Arlette Michel; Loïc Chotard (eds.). L'esthétique dans les correspondances d'écrivains et de musiciens, XIXe–XXe siècles (in French). Paris: Presses de l'Université de Paris-Sorbonne. ISBN 978-2-84050-128-2.
- Daniel, Keith W (1982). Francis Poulenc: His Artistic Development and Musical Style. Ann Arbor, US: UMI Research Press. ISBN 978-0-8357-1284-2.
- Delamarche, Claire (1996). Notes to CD set Poulenc Concertos. London: Decca. OCLC 40895775.
- Desgraupes, Bernard; Keith Anderson (trans) (1996). Notes to CD set Les mariés de la tour Eiffel. Munich: MVD. OCLC 884183553.
- Doctor, Jennifer (1999). The BBC and Ultra-modern Music, 1922–1936. Cambridge and New York: Cambridge University Press. ISBN 978-0-521-66117-1.
- Harding, James (1994). Notes to CD set Ravel and Poulenc – Complete Chamber Music for Woodwinds, Volume 2. London: Cala Records. OCLC 32519527.
- Hell, Henri; Edward Lockspeiser (trans) (1959). Francis Poulenc. New York: Grove Press. OCLC 1268174.
- Hinson, Maurice (2000). Guide to the Pianist's Repertoire. Bloomington, US: Indiana University Press. ISBN 978-0-253-10908-8.
- Ivry, Benjamin (1996). Francis Poulenc. London: Phaidon Press. ISBN 978-0-7148-3503-7.
- Johnson, Graham (2013). Notes to CD set Francis Poulenc – The Complete Songs. London: Hyperion. OCLC 858636867.
- Keck, George Russell (1990). Francis Poulenc – A Bio-bibliography. New York: Greenwood Press. ISBN 978-0-313-25562-5.
- Landormy, Paul (1943). La musique française après Debussy. Paris: Gallimard. OCLC 3659976.
- Machart, Renaud (1995). Poulenc (in French). Paris: Seuil. ISBN 978-2-02-013695-2.
- Nectoux, Jean-Michel; Roger Nichols (trans) (1991). Gabriel Fauré – A Musical Life. Cambridge: Cambridge University Press. ISBN 978-0-521-23524-2.
- Nichols, Roger (1987). Ravel Remembered. London: Faber and Faber. ISBN 978-0-571-14986-5.
- Orledge, Robert (2003). "Satie and Les Six". In Richard Langham Smith; Caroline Potter (eds.). French Music since Berlioz. Aldershot, UK and Burlington, US: Ashgate. ISBN 978-0-7546-0282-8.
- Poulenc, Francis (1963). Stéphane Audel (ed.). Moi et mes amis (in French). Paris and Geneva: Palatine. OCLC 504681160.
- Poulenc, Francis (1978). Stéphane Audel (ed.). My Friends and Myself. Translated by James Harding. London: Dennis Dobson. ISBN 978-0-234-77251-5.
- Poulenc, Francis (1991). Sidney Buckland (ed.). Francis Poulenc: Correspondence 1915–1963. Translated by Sidney Buckland. London: Victor Gollancz. ISBN 978-0-575-05093-8.
- Poulenc, Francis (1994). Myriam Chimènes (ed.). Correspondance 1910–1963 (in French). Paris: Fayard. ISBN 978-2-213-03020-3.
- Poulenc, Francis (2014). Nicolas Southon (ed.). Articles and Interviews – Notes from the Heart. Translated by Roger Nichols. Burlington, US: Ashgate. ISBN 978-1-4094-6622-2.
- Romain, Edwin (1978). A Study of Francis Poulenc's Fifteen Improvisations for Piano Solo. Hattiesburg, US: University of Southern Mississippi. OCLC 18081101.
- Roy, Jean (1964). Francis Poulenc (in French). Paris: Seghers. OCLC 2044230.
- Sams, Jeremy (1997) [1993]. "Poulenc, Francis". In Amanda Holden (ed.). The Penguin Opera Guide. London: Penguin Books. ISBN 978-0-14-051385-1.
- Schmidt, Carl B (1995). The Music of Francis Poulenc (1899–1963) – A Catalogue. Oxford and New York: Oxford University Press. ISBN 978-0-19-816336-7.
- Schmidt, Carl B (2001). Entrancing Muse: A Documented Biography of Francis Poulenc. Hillsdale, US: Pendragon Press. ISBN 978-1-57647-026-8.
