= Stabat Mater (Poulenc) =

Composition by Francis Poulenc

- Choral music by Francis Poulenc
- Catalogue: FP 148
- Text: Stabat Mater
- Language: Latin
- Composed: 1950
- Performed: 1951
- Scoring: soprano solo; mixed choir; orchestra

Stabat Mater, FP 148, is a musical setting of the Stabat Mater sequence composed by Francis Poulenc in 1950.

== Background ==
Poulenc wrote the piece in response to the death of his friend, artist Christian Bérard; he considered writing a Requiem for Bérard, but, after returning to the shrine of the Black Virgin of Rocamadour, he selected the medieval Stabat Mater text. Poulenc's setting, scored for soprano solo, mixed chorus, and orchestra, premiered on the 13th of June 1951 at the Strasbourg Festival. It was well received throughout Europe and in the United States where it won the New York Critic's Circle Award for Best Choral Work of the year.

== Structure ==
The Stabat Mater is divided into twelve movements, which vary dramatically in character from somber to light and frivolous, even on the most serious of texts. All the movements, though, are relatively brief; Robert Shaw's Telarc recording runs just under 30 minutes, with the longest movement taking just over four minutes.

1. Stabat mater dolorosa (Très calme)
2. Cujus animam gementem (Allegro molto—Très violent)
3. O quam tristis (Très lent)
4. Quae moerebat (Andantino)
5. Quis est homo (Allegro molto—Prestissimo)
6. Vidit suum (Andante)
7. Eja mater (Allegro)
8. Fac ut ardeat (Maestoso)
9. Sancta mater (Moderato—Allegretto)
10. Fac ut portem (To. de Sarabande)
11. Inflammatus et accensus (Animé et très rythmé)
12. Quando corpus (Très calme)

The soprano soloist appears in only three movements: Vidit suum, Fac ut portem, and Quando corpus. The chorus appears largely a cappella in two others, O quam tristis and Fac ut ardeat, although the orchestra is not fully silent in either.

== Instrumentation ==
- Piccolo, 2 flutes, 2 oboes, English horn, 2 clarinets (B♭), bass clarinet, 3 bassoons
- 4 French horns, 3 trumpets (C), 3 trombones, tuba
- Timpani, 2 Harps
- Strings
- Soprano solo, SATBarB Chorus (divisi)

== Recordings ==
Release year	Soloist	Conductor	Orchestra	Label	Catalog Number
1989	Kathleen Battle	Seiji Ozawa	Boston Symphony Orchestra	Chandos	9341
1996	Danielle Borst	Michel Piquemal	Orchestre de la Cité	Naxos	8553176
2002	Judith Howarth	Christopher Robinson	BBC Philharmonic Orchestra	Opus Arte	817
2002	Christine Goerke	Robert Shaw	Atlanta Symphony Orchestra	Telarc	80362
2006	Catherine Dubosc	Richard Hickox	City of London Sinfonia	Erato	63294
2013	Marlis Petersen	Stéphane Denève	Stuttgart Radio Symphony Orchestra	Hänssler Classic	93297
2013	Patricia Petibon	Paavo Järvi	Paris Orchestra	Deutsche Grammophon	001931002
2014	Carolyn Sampson	Daniel Reuss	Cappella Amsterdam, Estonian Philharmonic Chamber Choir & Estonian National Symphony Orchestra	Harmonia Mundi	HMC902149
2018	Kate Royal	Yannick Nézet-Séguin	London Philharmonic Orchestra	Lpo	108
2019	Marian Tassou	Hervé Niquet	Brussels Philharmonic Orchestra	Epr Classic	EPRC 0032

== Source texts ==
- Hell, Henri 1959, Francis Poulenc, London: John Calder
- Ivry, Benjamin 1996, Francis Poulenc (20th-Century Composers series), Phaidon Press, ISBN 0-7148-3503-X.
- Mellers, Wilfrid 1993, Francis Poulenc, New York: Oxford University Press
- Schmidt, Carl B. (1995). The Music of Francis Poulenc (1899–1963): A Catalogue. Oxford: Clarendon Press. ISBN 978-0-19-816336-7.
