= Christian Bérard =

French painter

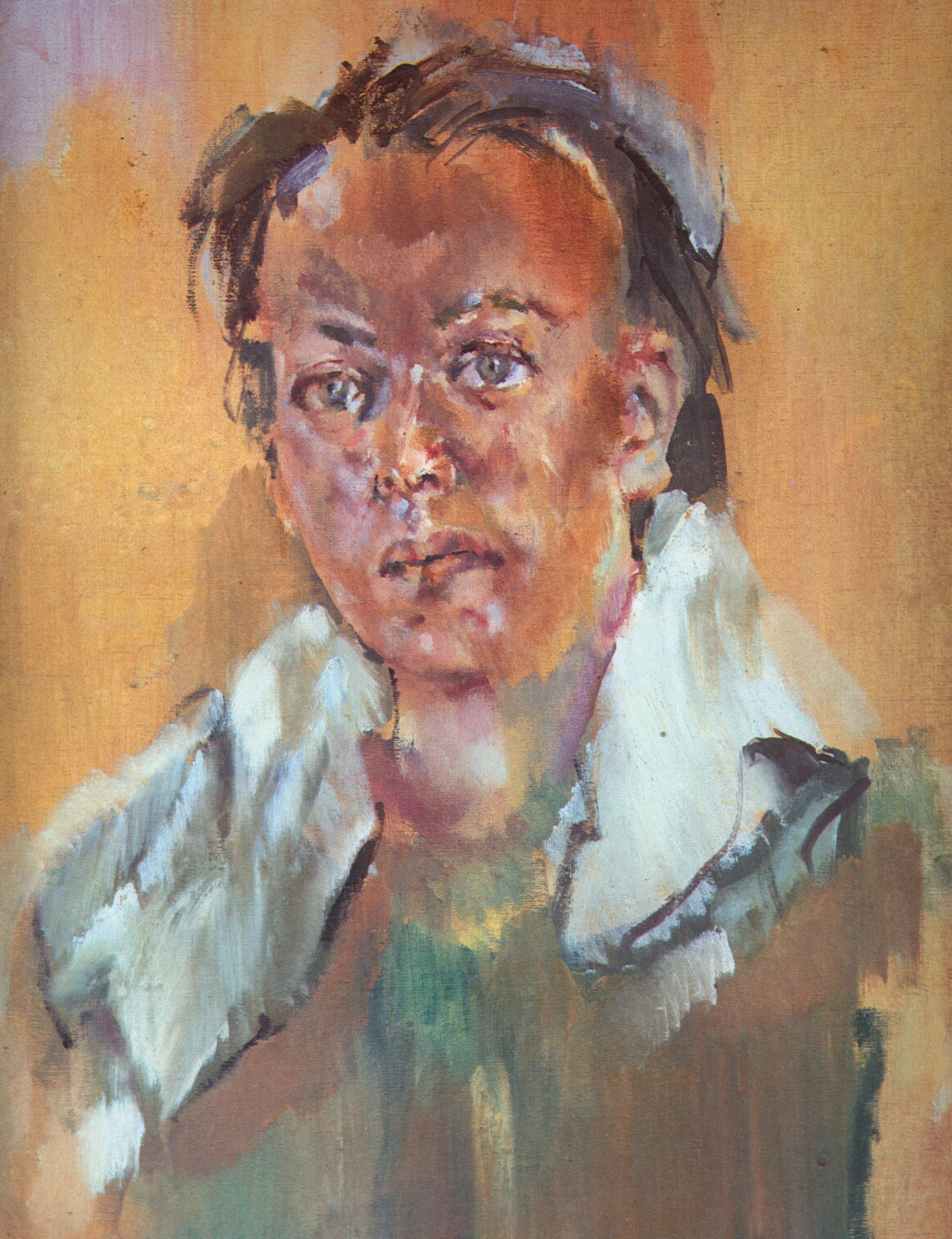
- Christian Bérard self-portrait, 1948
- Born: 20 August 1902; Paris, France
- Died: 11 February 1949 (aged 46); Paris, France
- Other name: Bebè

Christian Bérard (20 August 1902 – 11 February 1949), also known as Bebè, was a French artist, fashion illustrator and designer.

Bérard and his lover Boris Kochno, who worked for the Ballets Russes and was also co-founder of the Ballets des Champs-Elysées, were one of the most prominent openly homosexual couples in French theater during the 1930s and 1940s.

== Early life ==
Born in Paris in 1902, Bérard studied at the Lycée Janson de Sailly as a child. In 1920, he entered the Academie Ranson, where his style was influenced by Édouard Vuillard and Maurice Denis.

== Career ==
Bérard showed his first exhibition in 1925, at the Gallery Pierre. From the start of his career, he had an interest in theatrical scenery and costume designs, and played an important role in the development of theatrical design in the 1930s and 1940s. In the early 1930s, Bérard worked with Jean-Michel Frank, painting screens, wood-work and drawing projects for carpets.

In 1935, his friend Solange d'Ayen helped Vogue magazine editor-in-chief Edna Woolman Chase persuade him to work for Vogue as a fashion illustrator.

He also worked as a fashion illustrator for Coco Chanel, Elsa Schiaparelli, and Nina Ricci. Bérard's most renowned achievement was probably his lustrous, magical designs for Jean Cocteau's film La Belle et la Bête (1946).

Bérard died suddenly from a heart attack on 11 February 1949, on the stage of the Théâtre Marigny. Francis Poulenc's Stabat Mater (1950) was composed in his memory, and Jean Cocteau dedicated his film Orphée (1950) to him.
