= Ernest Bourmauck =

French choir leader and conductor

Ernest Bourmauck (18.. – 1944) was a French choir leader and conductor. Very little is known about him except that he worked closely with Gabriel Fauré, particularly premiering the French composer's Requiem and Francis Poulenc's Mass in G major.

Poulenc composed "Tristis est anima mea" (fourth part of the Quatre motets pour un temps de pénitence) in Paris in November 1938 and dedicated it to Bourmauck.

He directed "Les Chanteurs de Lyon" (another name for "Les Chœurs de Lyon", according to BNF) between 1934 and 1942 on "Francis Poulenc" when he was succeeded by André Cluytens.
