= Christian Merlin =

French music critic and musicologist

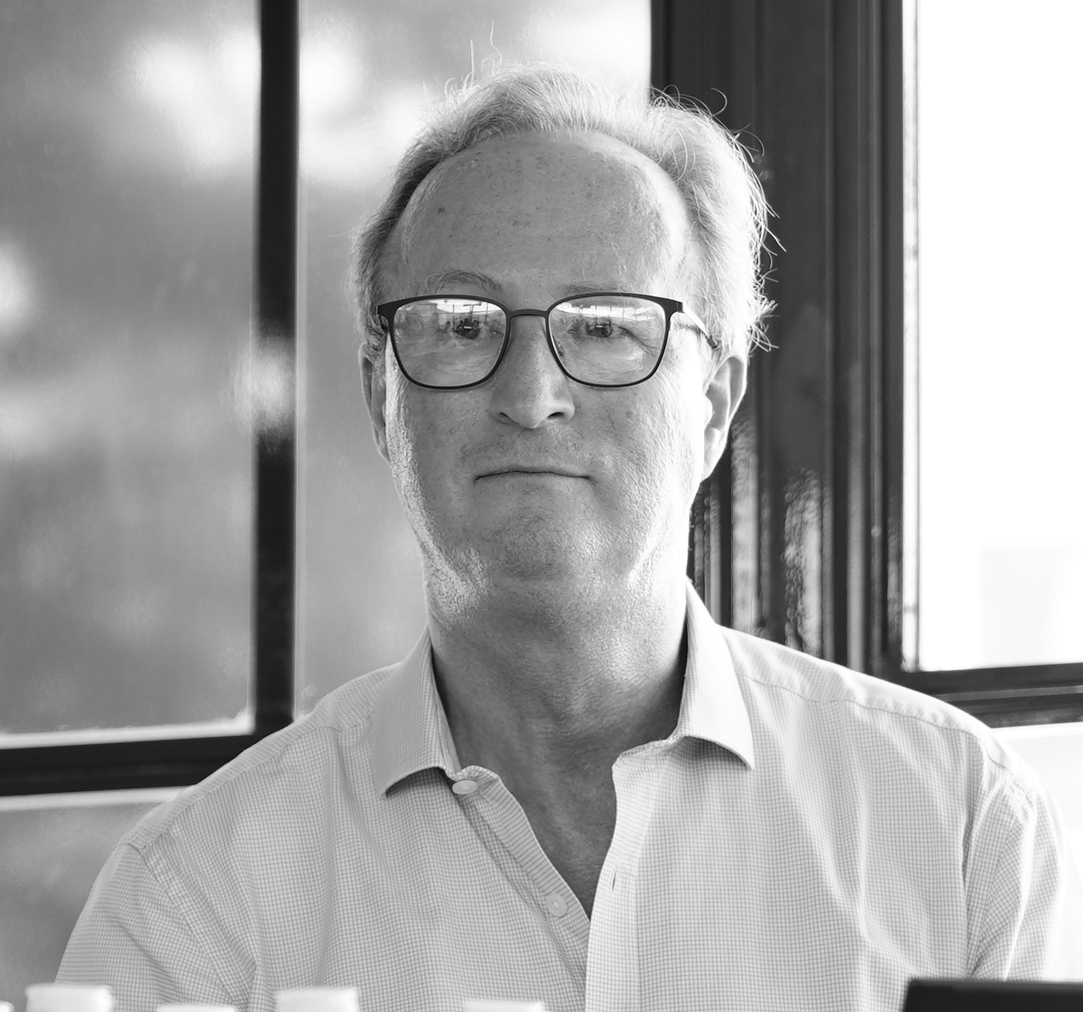
Rheims, 2025.

Christian Merlin (born 2 March 1964) is a French contemporary music critic and musicologist.

== Biography ==
Christian Merlin, who holds an agrégation in German and a doctorate in literature, is a musicologist and a lecturer at the Charles de Gaulle University – Lille III. A music critic at Le Figaro and the magazine Diapason, he contributes to programmes on France Musique such as Le Casque et l'enclume and Classic Club. He is also the author or editor of several issues of L'Avant-Scène Opéra, as well as of a book devoted to the symphony orchestra, documented by long years of acquaintance with instrumentalists and conductors.

== Publications ==
- 2002: Richard Wagner, mode d'emploi, éd. L'Avant-Scène Opéra,ISBN 2-84385-193-9.
- 2007: Richard Strauss, mode d'emploi, éd. L'Avant-Scène Opéra, 191 pages ISBN 978-2-84385-244-2.
- 2007: Opéra et mise en scène, (dir.) éd. L'Avant-Scène Opéra, 120 pages,ISBN 978-2-84385-245-9.
- 2012: Au cœur de l'orchestre, Paris, Fayard, 520 pages, ISBN 978-2-21366315-9
- 2013: Les grands chefs d'orchestre du XXe siècle, Paris, Éditions Buchet/Chastel, 424 pages, ISBN 978-2-283-02560-4
- 2017: Le Philharmonique de Vienne, Paris, Éditions Buchet/Chastel, 690 pages,ISBN 978-2-283-02984-8
