= Benjamin Ivry =

American writer

Benjamin Ivry is an American writer on the arts, broadcaster and translator.

Ivry authored biographies of Francis Poulenc, Arthur Rimbaud, and Maurice Ravel, as well as a poetry collection, Paradise for the Portuguese Queen. The latter contains poems that first appeared in, among other places, The New Yorker, the London Review of Books, The Spectator, Ambit Magazine, and The New Republic.

He has also translated books from the French by authors such as André Gide, Jules Verne, Witold Gombrowicz, and Balthus. Ivry has written about the arts for a variety of periodicals including The New York Observer, The New York Sun, New England Review, The Economist, The Wall Street Journal, Newsweek, Time, New Statesman, The New York Times, Bloomberg.com, and The Washington Post.

== Selected bibliography ==
=== Biographies ===
- Francis Poulenc, 1996, Phaidon, ISBN 0-7148-3503-X
- Arthur Rimbaud, 1998, Absolute Press, ISBN 1-899791-71-X
- Maurice Ravel: a Life, 2000, Welcome Rain, ISBN 1-56649-152-5, translated into Japanese by Shun Ishihara as *Mōrisu raveru: aru shōgai, 2002, Arufabēta, ISBN 4-87198-469-9

=== Poetry ===
- Paradise for the Portuguese Queen: Poems by Benjamin Ivry, 1998, Orchises Press, ISBN 0-914061-69-0

=== Nonfiction ===
- Regatta: a Celebration of The Art of Oarsmanship, 1988, Simon and Schuster, ISBN 0-671-69936-9
- Sighing For The Silvery Moon: English Music Hall Songs Reexamined, 2022, Wolke Verlag, ISBN 978-3-95593-323-4
- Parlez-moi d’amour: Themes in French Popular Song from the Commune to World War II, 2023, Wolke Verlag, ISBN 978-3-95593-325-8

=== Translations ===
- Without End: New and Selected Poems by Adam Zagajewski, translated by Benjamin Ivry with Renata Gorczynski and Clare Cavanagh, 2002, Farrar, Straus & Giroux, ISBN 0-374-22096-4
- Magellania by Jules Verne, translated by Benjamin Ivry, 2002, Welcome Rain Publishers, ISBN 978-1-56649-179-2
- Judge Not by André Gide, translated by Benjamin Ivry, 2003, University of Illinois Press, ISBN 0-252-02844-9
- Vanished Splendors, a Memoir by Balthus, translated by Benjamin Ivry, 2003, Ecco Press, ISBN 0-06-621260-X
- Mon Docteur, Le Vin (My Doctor, Wine) by Gaston Derys with Watercolors by Raoul Dufy, translated by Benjamin Ivry, 2003, Yale University Press, ISBN 0-300-10133-3
- A Guide to Philosophy in Six Hours and Fifteen Minutes, by Witold Gombrowicz, translated by Benjamin Ivry, 2007, Yale University Press, ISBN 0-300-12368-X
- At Home with André and Simone Weil, by Sylvie Weil, translated by Benjamin Ivry, 2010, Northwestern University Press, ISBN 978-0-8101-2704-3
- Chinese Piano: or Dueling over a Recital, by Étienne Barilier, translated by Benjamin Ivry, 2015, Verlag Traugott Bautz GmbH, ISBN 978-3-9594-8086-4
- Clepsydra: Essay on the Plurality of Time in Judaism, by Sylvie Anne Goldberg, translated by Benjamin Ivry, 2016, Stanford University Press, ISBN 978-0-8047-8905-9
- Transmitting Jewish History: In Conversation with Sylvie Anne Goldberg, by Yosef Hayim Yerushalmi, translated by Benjamin Ivry, 2021, Brandeis University Press, ISBN 978-1684580613
- An Imperial Sake Cup and I, by Charnvit Kasetsiri, translated by Benjamin Ivry, 2024, The Textbook Foundation, ISBN 978-6168292143
- My Turbulent Life and 21 Years of Exile in the People’s Republic of China, by Pridi Banomyong, translated by Benjamin Ivry, 2026, ISEAS Publishing, ISBN 978-9815203851

=== Book chapters, prefaces, editions ===
- The Trouble with Being Born, by E. M. Cioran, translated by Richard Howard, preface by Benjamin Ivry, 1993, Quartet Books, ISBN 0-7043-0180-6
- Entretiens, by E. M. Cioran, chapter by Benjamin Ivry, 1995, Gallimard Publishers, ISBN 2-07-073394-7
- Love & Folly: Selected Fables and Tales of La Fontaine, by Jean de La Fontaine, translated by Marie Ponsot, edited and prefaced by Benjamin Ivry, 2002, Welcome Rain Publishers, ISBN 1-56649-227-0
- American Writers: a Collection of literary biographies. Supplement XIV, Cleanth Brooks to Logan Pearsall Smith, edited by Jay Parini, essay on Logan Pearsall Smith by Benjamin Ivry, 2004, Charles Scribner's Sons, ISBN 0-684-31234-4
- British Writers Supplement X, edited by Jay Parini, essay on Norman Douglas by Benjamin Ivry, 2004, Charles Scribner's Sons, ISBN 0-684-31312-X
- The Oxford Encyclopaedia of American Literature, edited by Jay Parini, essay on Herman Melville by Benjamin Ivry, 2004, Oxford University Press, ISBN 0-19-515653-6
- The Oxford Encyclopaedia of American Literature, edited by Jay Parini, essay on Richard Howard by Benjamin Ivry, 2004, Oxford University Press, ISBN 0-19-515653-6
- King Solomon's Mines, by H. Rider Haggard, preface by Benjamin Ivry, 2004, Barnes & Noble Classics, ISBN 1-59308-275-4
- American Writers: a Collection of Literary Biographies. Supplement XVI, John James Audubon to Gustaf Sobin, edited by Jay Parini, essay on Anita Loos by Benjamin Ivry, 2007, Charles Scribner's Sons, ISBN 0-684-31510-6
- British Writers. Supplement XVI, edited by Jay Parini, essay on Thomas Campion by Benjamin Ivry, 2010, Charles Scribner's Sons, ISBN 1-4144-3903-2
- American Writers: Supplement XX, a Collection of Literary Biographies, edited by Jay Parini, essay on Howard Overing Sturgis by Benjamin Ivry, 2010, Charles Scribner's Sons, ISBN 1-4144-3892-3
- Histoire juive de la France, edited by Sylvie-Anne Goldberg, essay on Barbara by Benjamin Ivry, 2023, Albin Michel, ISBN 2-2264-4803-9
