= Mass in G major (Poulenc) =

Composition by Francis Poulenc

Messe en sol majeur
- Missa brevis by Francis Poulenc
- Catalogue: FP 89
- Text: Mass
- Language: Latin
- Composed: 1937
- Published: 1937
- Scoring: soprano, SATB choir a cappella

Messe en sol majeur (Mass in G major), FP 89, is a missa brevis by Francis Poulenc. He set most parts of the Latin mass to music in 1937, scored for a mixed choir a cappella.

== History ==
Poulenc turned to sacred music first in 1937 when he composed the mass Messe en sol majeur. He dedicated it to the memory of his father who had died some years before. He set all the parts of the Latin mass, with the exception of the Credo, in 1937, scored for a soprano soloist and a mixed choir a cappella. As he omitted the Credo, it is technically a missa brevis, in five movements:

1. Kyrie (Animé et très rythmé)
2. Gloria (Très animé)
3. Sanctus (Très allant et doucement joyeux)
4. Benedictus (Calme mais sans lenteur)
5. Agnus Dei (Très pur, très clair et modéré)

The choral writing for unaccompanied choir has been described as of "cool purity". The first performance was sung in Paris on 3 April 1938 by Les Chœurs de Lyon.

There are numerous recordings of the mass; the earliest may be a ca.1940 recording on 78 rpm of Les Chanteurs de Lyon (another name for Les Chœurs de Lyon, according to BNF) conducted by Ernest Bourmauck between 1934 and 1942 when he was succeeded by André Cluytens.

== Bibliography ==
- Lace, Ian (2000). "Francis Poulenc (1899–1963) / Libertè – Francis Poulenc a cappella". musicweb-international.com.
- Schmidt, Carl B. (1995). The Music of Francis Poulenc (1899–1963): A Catalogue. Oxford: Clarendon Press. ISBN 978-0-19-816336-7.
