= Luigini =

Luigini is a surname. Notable people with the surname include:

- Alexandre Luigini (1850–1906), French composer and conductor
- Caroline Luigini (1873–1968), French musician, harpist and professor, daughter of Alexandre
