= Antoine Ponchin =

French painter

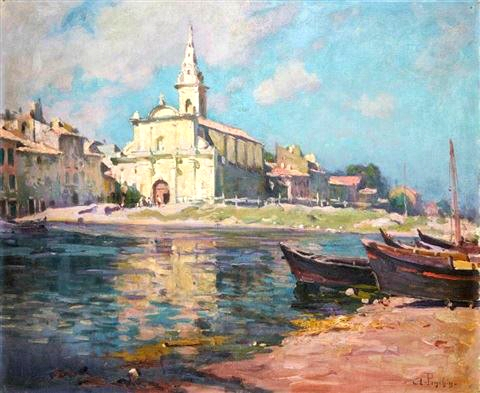
View of Martigues

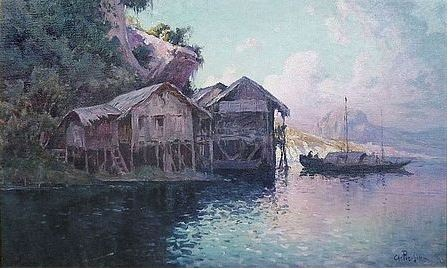
Sampans at Hạ Long

Antoine Marius Simon Ponchin (29 October 1872, Marseille - 15 December 1933, Paris) was a French Impressionist landscape painter.

== Biography ==
His father, Joseph Marius Ponchin (1846-1891) was also a painter. He was a student of Théophile Henri Décanis, Julien Gustave Gagliardini and Jean-Baptiste Olive. From 1893 until his death, he was a regular exhibitor at the Salon. He received honorable mention there in 1904 and a third-class medal in 1906, the same year he was awarded the Prix de Raigecourt-Goyon for landscape painting. In 1910, he received a second-class medal.

In 1922, after having participated in the Exposition coloniale de Marseille and being awarded the Prix de l'Indochine, he was sent on a mission to Hanoi by the Colonial Ministry. He was accompanied by his son, Joseph Henri (1897-1981), who was also a painter. Together, they decorated the new Lycée Albert-Sarraut.

The mission was a great success and he was nominated for the Legion of Honor by Albert Sarraut himself, who was then the Colonial Minister. That same year, he was named a Knight in the Legion.

His works may be seen at the Musée des Beaux-Arts de Chambéry, Musée des Beaux-Arts de Nîmes, the Musée des Beaux-Arts de Rouen and the Huntsville Museum of Art.
