= Henri Dabadie =

French painter

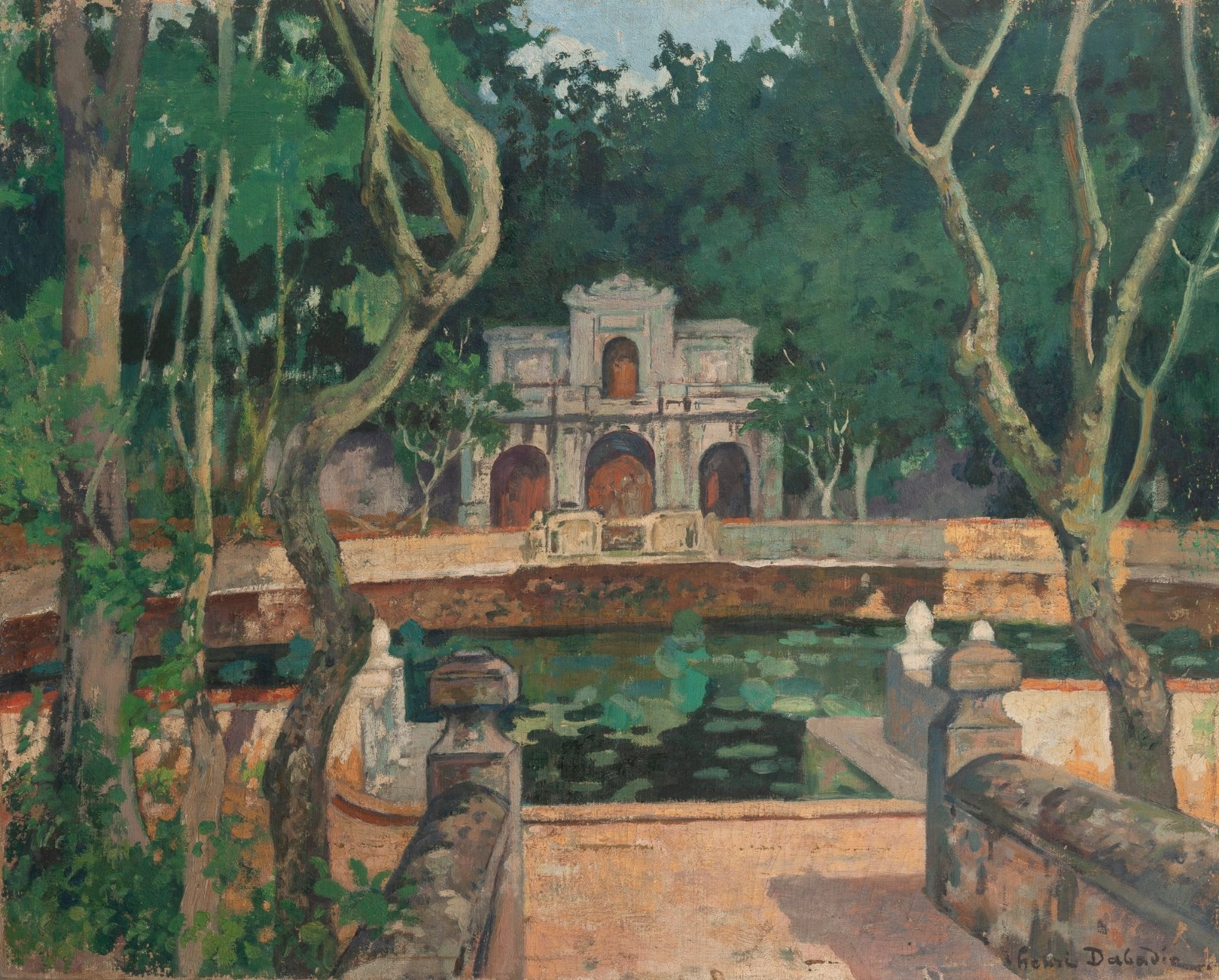
Nymphaeum in a Park

Henri Célestin Louis Dabadie (1 December 1867, Pau - 19 October 1949, Saint-Mandé) was a French landscape and Orientalist painter.

== Biography ==
He was a student of Jules-Élie Delaunay and Henri Michel-Lévy. After completing his studies, he devoted himself to Impressionistic landscape painting; primarily in Brittany. He alo painted harbor scenes in Rotterdam and Hamburg.

From 1894, he was a regular exhibitor at the Salon of the Société des Artistes Français. He was awarded a third-class medal in 1895 and a second-class medal in 1901.

Thanks to the Société des Peintres Orientalistes Français, he was able to spend a year at the Villa Abd-el-Tif in Algeria, and pay a visit to Tunisia. In 1928, he was named a Knight in the Legion of Honor. That same year, he won the Prix de l'Indochine and settled in Hanoi, where he taught at the Hanoi College of Fine Arts, operated by Victor Tardieu.

== Sources ==
- Dabadie, Henri. In: Ulrich Thieme (Ed.): Allgemeines Lexikon der Bildenden Künstler von der Antike bis zur Gegenwart. Vol. 8: Coutan–Delattre. E. A. Seemann, Leipzig 1912, pgs. 247–248 Online
- Marion Vidal-Bué, Alger et ses peintres (1830-1960), Méditerranée, 2002, pg. 280 ISBN 978-2-8427-2095-7
- Élisabeth Cazenave, L'Afrique du Nord révélée par les musées de province, Bernard Giovanangeli Editeur, 2004 ISBN 978-2-909034-60-7
