= Germaine Tailleferre =

French composer (1892–1983)

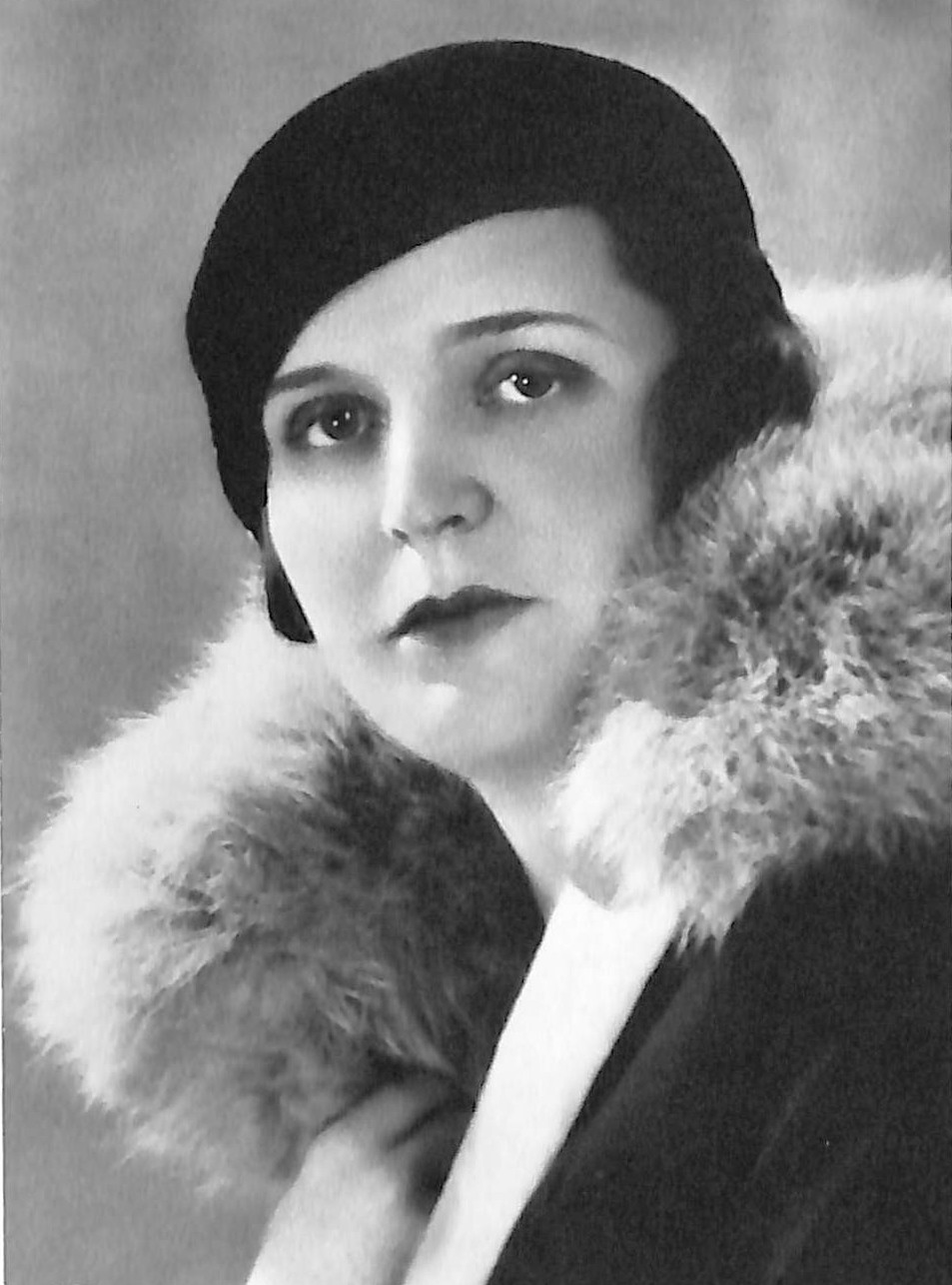
- Born: Marcelle Germaine Taillefesse; 19 April 1892; Saint-Maur-des-Fossés, Val-de-Marne, France
- Died: 7 November 1983 (aged 91); Paris, France
- Spouses: Ralph Barton (m. 1926; div. 1931) Jean Lageat (m. 1932; div. 1955)
- Children: 1

Marcelle Germaine Tailleferre (French: [ʒɛʁmɛn tɑjfɛʁ]; née Taillefesse; 19 April 1892 – 7 November 1983) was a French composer and the only female member of the group of composers known as Les Six.

== Biography ==
Marcelle Germaine Taillefesse was born in Saint-Maur-des-Fossés, Val-de-Marne, France. As a young woman she changed her last name from "Taillefesse" to "Tailleferre" to spite her father, who had refused to support her musical studies. She began studying piano with her mother at age four and composed short works of her own. She was said to have a very good ear, even at a young age, accurately judging the playing techniques of others.

Tailleferre studied at the Paris Conservatory, where she met Louis Durey, Francis Poulenc, Darius Milhaud, Georges Auric, and Arthur Honegger. She won prizes in several categories. Most notably, Tailleferre wrote 18 short works in the Petit livre de harpe de Madame Tardieu for Caroline Luigini, the Conservatory's assistant professor of harp.

With her new friends, she was soon associating with the artistic crowd in the Paris districts of Montmartre and Montparnasse, including the sculptor Emmanuel Centore, who later married her sister Jeanne. She also fraternized with artists like Pablo Picasso and Amedeo Modigliani at the Café de la Rotonde. In the Montparnasse atelier of one of her painter friends the idea for Les Six began. The publication of Jean Cocteau's manifesto Le coq et l'Arlequin resulted in Henri Collet's articles that led to instant fame for the group, of which Tailleferre was the only female member.

In 1923, Tailleferre began to spend a great deal of time with Maurice Ravel at his home in Montfort-l'Amaury. Ravel encouraged her to enter the Prix de Rome Competition. In 1926, she married Ralph Barton, an American caricaturist, and moved to Manhattan, New York. Like Tailleferre's father, Barton did not support her musical pursuits. In her memoir, Tailleferre said she hardly composed during the 2 ½ years they were married. She remained in the United States until 1927, when she and her husband returned to France. They divorced shortly thereafter.

Tailleferre wrote many of her most important works during the 1920s, including her First Piano Concerto, the Harp Concertino, the ballets Le marchand d'oiseaux (the most frequently performed ballet in the repertoire of the Ballets suédois during the 1920s), La nouvelle Cythère, which was commissioned by Sergei Diaghilev for the ill-fated 1929 season of the Ballets Russes, and Sous les ramparts d'Athènes in collaboration with Paul Claudel, as well as several film scores, including B'anda, in which she used African themes.

Tailleferre also had experience with choreography thanks to her work with Jean Borlin on Le marchand d'oiseaux. Borlin, the chief dancer and official choreographer of the Ballet Suédois, encouraged composers of new ballets to add their own ideas to the choreography. She later said she danced and ran across the stage in her enthusiasm and recklessness.

In 1931 she gave birth to her only child, Françoise Lageat, with lawyer Jean Lageat. The couple married in 1932 and divorced in 1955 after years of separation.

The 1930s were even more fruitful, with the Concerto for Two Pianos, Chorus, Saxophones, and Orchestra, the Violin Concerto, the opera cycle Du style galant au style méchant, the operas Zoulaïna and Le marin de Bolivar, and her masterwork, La cantate de Narcisse, in collaboration with Paul Valéry. Her work in film music included a collaboration with Maurice Cloche and a series of documentaries, with over 30 scores composed.

When World War II broke out, Tailleferre was forced to leave most of her scores at her home in Grasse, except her recently completed Three Études for Piano and Orchestra. Escaping across Spain to Portugal, she found passage on a boat that took her to the U.S., where she lived the war years in Philadelphia.

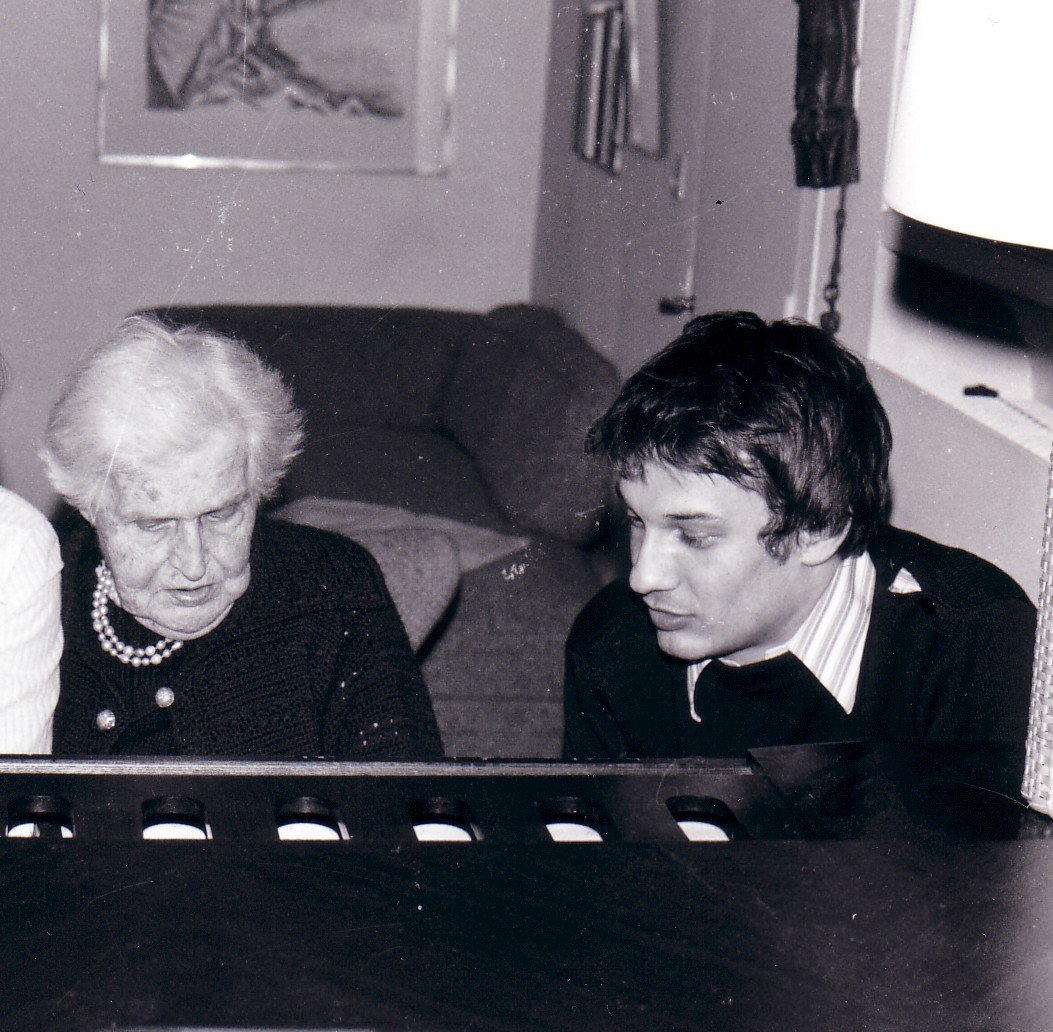
Germaine Tailleferre and Mario Hacquard

In 1946, Tailleferre returned to France, where she composed orchestral and chamber music and other works, including the ballets Paris-Magie (with Lise Delarme) and Parisiana (for the Royal Ballet of Copenhagen), the operas Il était un petit navire (with Henri Jeanson), Dolores, La petite sirène (with Philippe Soupault, based on Hans Christian Andersen's story "The Little Mermaid"), and Le maître (to a libretto by Ionesco), the musical comedy Parfums, the Concerto des vaines paroles for baritone voice, piano, and orchestra, the Concerto for Soprano and Orchestra, the Concertino for Flute, Piano, and Orchestra, the Second Piano Concerto, the Concerto for Two Guitars and Orchestra, her Second Sonata for Violin and Piano, and the Sonata for Harp, as well as many film and television scores. Most of this music was not published until after her death.

In 1976, Tailleferre accepted the post of accompanist for a children's music and movement class at the École alsacienne, a private school in Paris. During the last period of her life, she concentrated mainly on smaller forms due to increasing problems with arthritis in her hands. She produced the Sonate champêtre for oboe, clarinet, bassoon, and piano; the Sonata for Two Pianos; Chorale and Variations for Two Pianos or Orchestra; a series of children's songs (on texts by Jean Tardieu); and pieces for young pianists. Her last major work was the Concerto de la fidelité for coloratura soprano and orchestra, which was premièred at the Paris Opera the year before her death.

Tailleferre continued to compose until a few weeks before her death at age 91 on 7 November 1983. She is buried in Quincy-Voisins, Seine-et-Marne, France. She was the last surviving member of Les Six.

In 2023, BBC Radio 3 broadcast five hours of biography and critique of Tailleferre's works in one of its series Composer of the Week, including recordings of her works (available as podcasts).

== Sources ==
- Janelle Gelfand: "Germaine Tailleferre (1892-1983) Piano and Chamber works," Doctoral Dissertation, 1999, University of Cincinnati College Conservatory of Music
- Mitgang, Laura (May 23, 1982). "One of 'Les Six' Still at Work". The New York Times.
- Laura Mitgang: "Germaine Tailleferre: Before, During and After Les Six" in The Musical Woman, Vol. 11, Judith Lang Zaimont, editor (Greenwood Press, 1987)
- Caroline Potter/Robert Orledge: "Germaine Tailleferre (1892-1983): A Centenary Appraisal", Muziek & Wetenshap 2 (Summer 1992), pp. 109–130
- Robert Shapiro: Germaine Tailleferre: a Bio-Bibliography (Greenwood Press, 1994) ISBN 9780313286421
- Samuel Anthony Silva: "In Her Own Voice: Exploring the Role of the Piano in the Deuxième Sonate pour Violine et Piano by Germaine Taillferre," Doctoral Dissertation, 2008, University of Memphis Rudi E. Scheidt School of Music
- Genevieve McGahey: "Is life not an eternal new beginning?':Uncovering Germaine Tailleferre's Marchand d'oiseaux", Undergraduate Music Honors Thesis, 2012, Swarthmore College
