= Victor Tardieu =

French painter

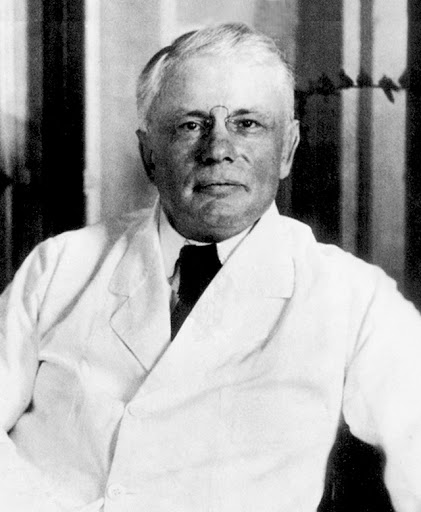
- Born: Victor François Tardieu; 30 April 1870; Orliénas, France
- Died: 12 June 1937 (aged 67); Hanoi, Vietnam
- Education: École nationale des beaux-arts de Lyon; Académie Julian; École des beaux-arts de Paris
- Known for: Co-founding École des Beaux Arts de l’Indochine, present day Vietnam University of Fine Arts (2025)
- Spouse: Caroline Luigini (m. 1902)
- Children: Jean Tardieu
- Relatives: Alexandre Luigini (father-in-law); Marie Laure Tardieu (daughter-in-law)
- Awards: Prix de l'Indochine; 1920
- Memorial: Monument at Vietnam University of Fine Arts

Director of École des Beaux-Arts de l'Indochine
- In office 1925-1937
- Preceded by: 1st incumbent
- Succeeded by: Évariste Jonchère

Victor François Tardieu (30 April 1870, Orliénas - 12 June 1937, Hanoi) was a French painter; cofounder of what is now known as the Vietnam University of Fine Arts.

== Biography ==
In 1887, he was admitted to the École nationale des beaux-arts de Lyon. After two years there, he transferred to the Académie Julian in Paris, where he studied for a year. In 1890, he entered the École des beaux-arts de Paris, with the advice and support of Léon Bonnat. He was employed in the workshops of Bonnat and Albert Maignan until 1894. He also collaborated with a stained glass artist, producing a series of glass boxes.

In 1902, he married the harpist, Caroline Luigini, daughter of the composer and conductor, Alexandre Luigini. They had one son, the writer Jean Tardieu.

Shortly after, at the Salon of the Société des artistes français, he won an award that came with a travel grant, allowing him to visit London, Liverpool and Genoa. From 1909 to 1911, he was engaged in painting the ceiling of the Village Hall in Les Lilas. In 1914, he volunteered for service in World War I and worked as a medical orderly in a field hospital near Dunkirk, during which time he continued to sketch.

After the war, in 1920, he painted another ceiling, in the Town Hall of Montrouge, with a series depicting "Les âges de la vie" (The Ages of Life). That same year, he received the Prix de l'Indochine and paid a six-month visit to the Far East. Finding himself attracted to the area, he settled in Hanoi the following year. His first work there was a "Canvas of Unity" for the amphitheatre of the University of Indochina.

In 1925, he and his friend, the painter Nguyễn Nam Sơn, created the École des Beaux-Arts de l'Indochine (now the Vietnam University of Fine Arts), where he served as Director until 1937.

His works may be seen at the Musée des beaux-arts de Lyon, the Musée des beaux-arts de Rennes and the Musée de l'Armée.

== Selected paintings ==
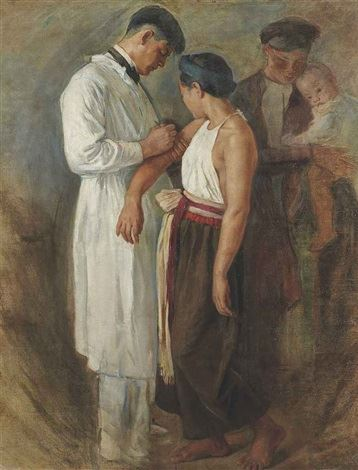
The Vaccination

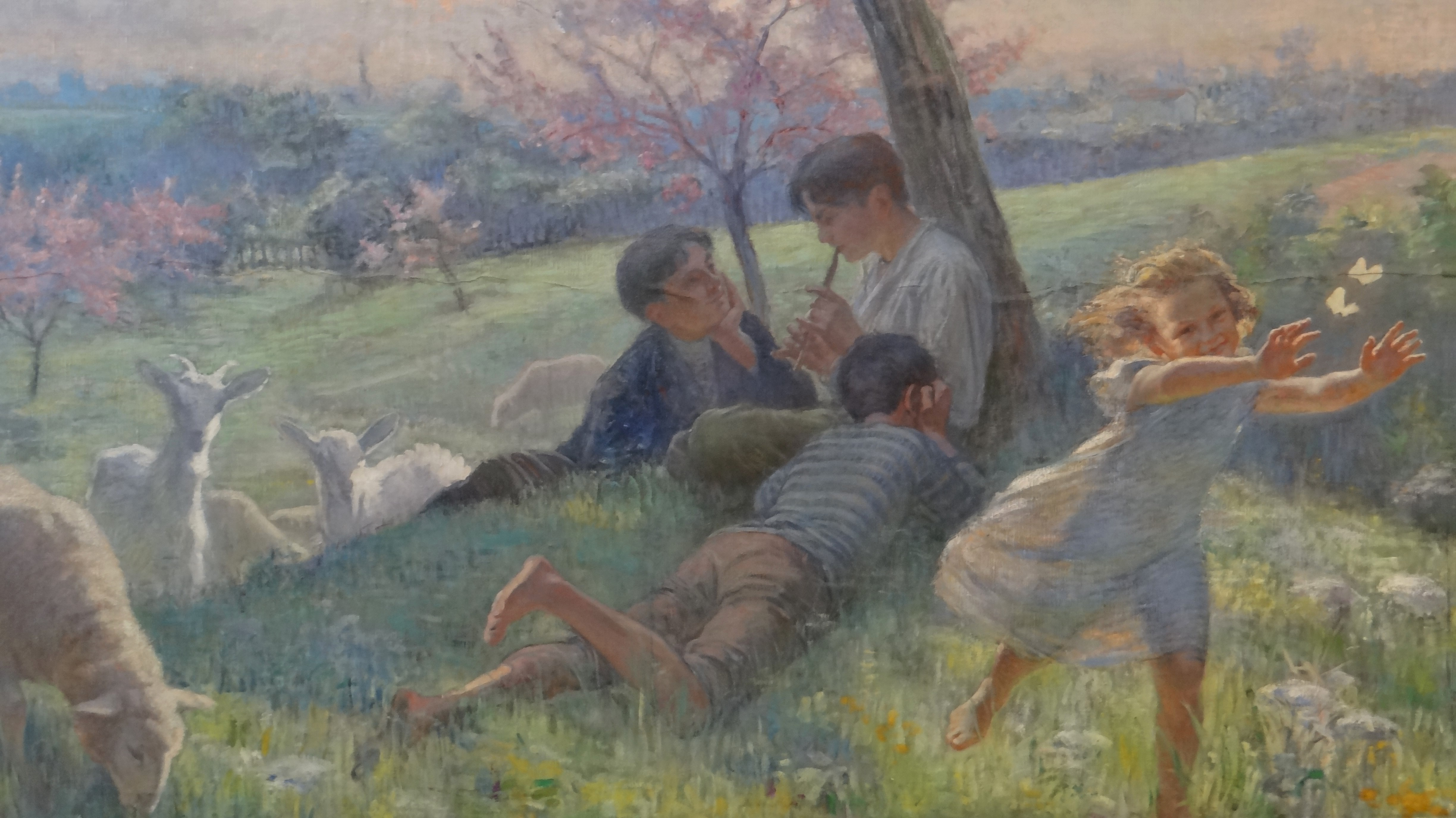
Infancy, from "The Ages of Life"

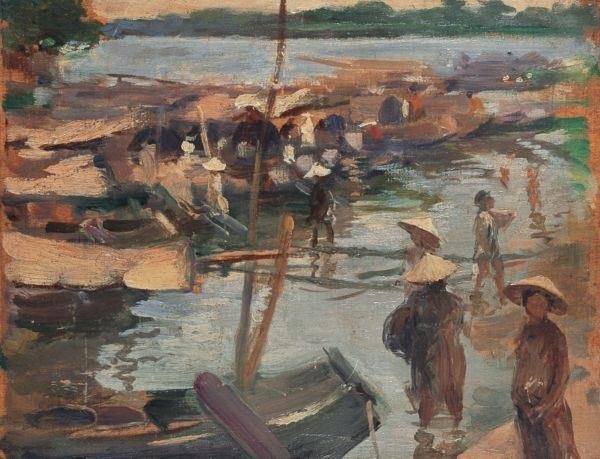
A Market by the River

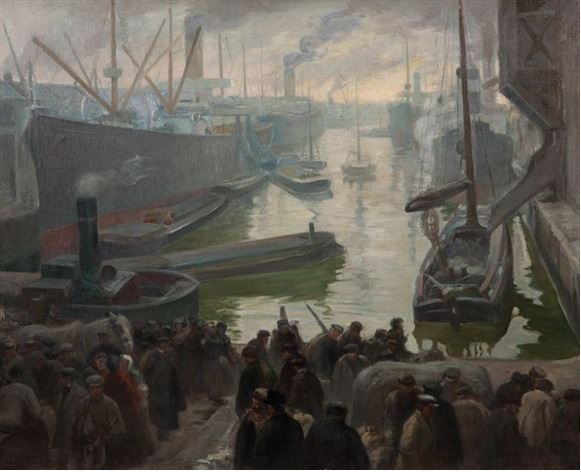
The Port of Liverpool
