= Peintre (disambiguation) =

Peintre is a commune in the Jura department in Franche-Comté in eastern France.

Peintre or Peintres may also refer to:

- Peintre Celebre (foaled 1994), thoroughbred racehorse
- Peintre-graveur, an artisan who creates original works in engravings
- Peintres voyageurs, term designating late 20th century itinerant French artists
- Peintre de la Marine, French title bestowed on an artist whose works depict the French Navy
- Premier peintre du Roi, French royal post from 1603 to 1791

== See also ==
- Painter (disambiguation)
