= Wilson, Keppel and Betty =

British entertainers

- The act in 1939

Background information
- Genres: Music hall
- Years active: 1928–1962
- Past members: Jack Wilson; Joe Keppel; Betty Knox; Patsy Knox

Wilson, Keppel and Betty formed a popular British music hall and vaudeville act, active primarily from 1928 to the early 60s. They capitalised on the fashion for Ancient Egyptian imagery following the discovery of the tomb of Tutankhamun. The "sand dance" that formed the highlight of their act was a parody of postures from Egyptian tomb paintings, combined with references to Arab costume. The lithe and extremely lanky Wilson and Keppel, who wore long moustaches and make-up to emphasise the sharp angularity of their features and make them appear almost identical, demonstrated their impressive suppleness in adopting wild gestures and dancing in identical "stereo" movements, while Betty joined their antics. The act included a soft-shoe routine performed on a layer of sand spread on the stage to create a rhythmic scratching with their shuffling feet and was usually performed to the familiar Egyptian Ballet (1875), by Alexandre Luigini.

== Early careers ==
Wilson, Keppel and Betty photographed in 1928

John (Jack) William Wilson (30 January 1894 – 29 August 1970) was born in Warrington in Lancashire, the son of a tanner; on leaving school Jack also worked as a tanner. During World War I Wilson served with the Royal Navy following which he travelled to Australia, where he joined Colleano's Circus in 1920.

John Joseph (Joe) Keppel (5 May 1894 – 14 June 1977) was born in County Cork in Ireland. In 1912 he joined the Royal Navy, but was discharged after five months as being unfit. After making his way to Australia he joined the Royal Australian Navy in 1914 and was discharged as unfit after almost two years. On travelling to Australia he also joined Colleano's Circus, where he was not discharged as unfit, but teamed up with Jack Wilson.

== Betty joins the act ==
In 1920 the duo travelled to Canada where they toured in a comedy tap dancing act, later also performing in vaudeville venues in the United States. By 1928 they were performing as 'The Bus Boys' and in this year Kansas-born chorus girl Betty Knox (Alice Elizabeth Peden, 10 May 1906 – 25 January 1963), who had been in a double act with Jack Benny, joined the act at Des Moines, Iowa. She is said to have married mechanic Donald Knox in 1923 and to have divorced him after a brief marriage, but there are no records to confirm either event. Their daughter Patricia Jean "Patsy" Knox (12 December 1923 – 12 May 1984) was born in Salina, Kansas. She was brought up by her grandparents for the next 14 years while her mother worked firstly in a chorus line and then with Wilson and Keppel.

== International celebrity ==
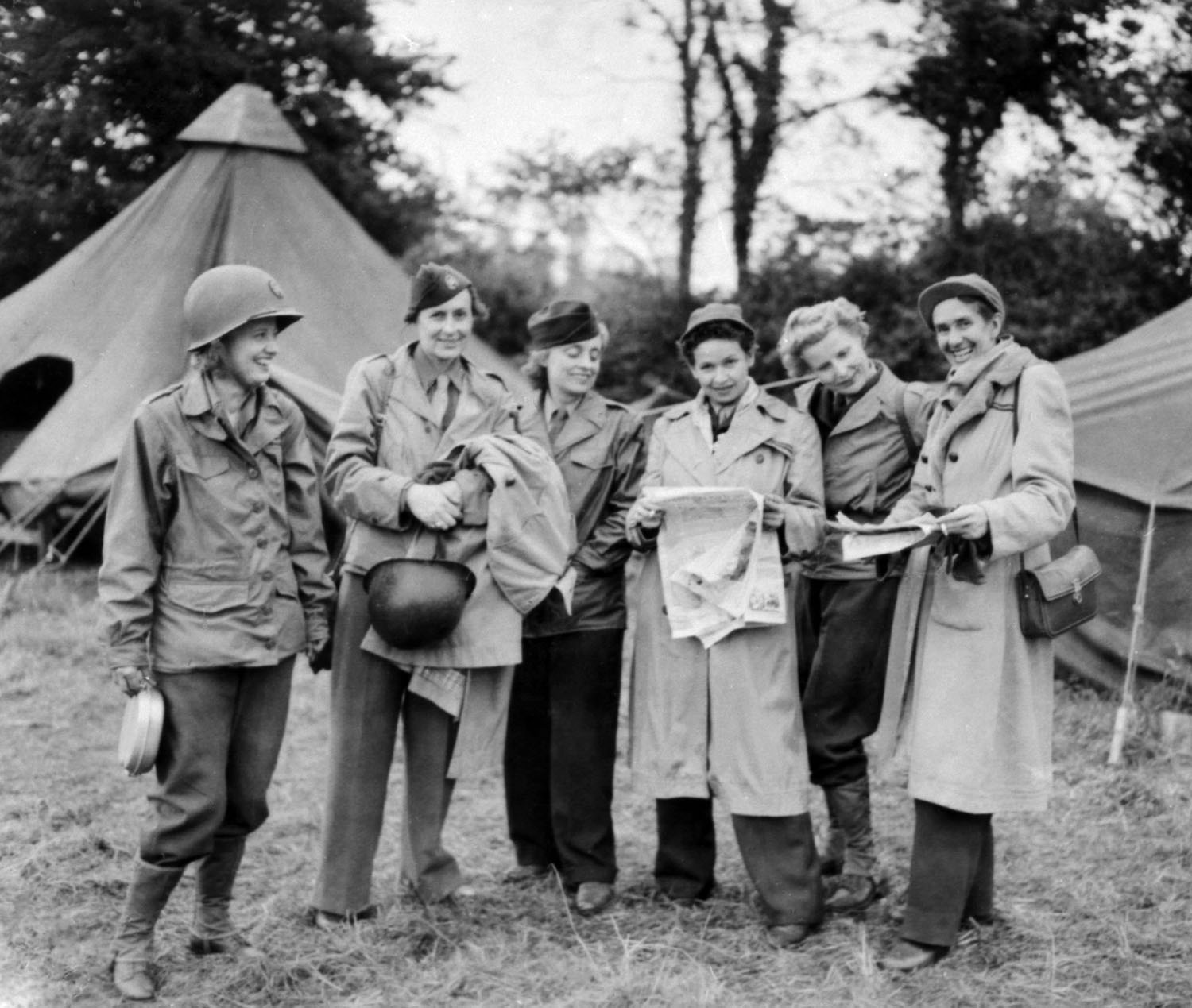
Betty Knox (third from right) in 1944 as a war correspondent for the London Evening Standard

The act came to Britain to appear at the London Palladium for a few weeks in 1932 and stayed permanently. Over the years there were between 8 and 12 'Bettys', most of these appearing during the act's later years: Betty Knox retired from the act in 1941 to go into journalism, becoming a war correspondent during the Second World War, and reporting on the Nuremberg trials for three years as a correspondent for the London Evening Standard. She was among the first to report the suicide of Hermann Göring.

Wilson and Keppel perform their Sand Dance routine in 1934.

Their "Cleopatra's Nightmare" routine was performed in 1936 in Berlin and condemned by Joseph Goebbels as indecent. In the UK they were regarded as one of the best 'speciality acts' – acts designed to balance and support the star of a variety programme. Typically these acts would last about ten minutes, and be repeated twelve times a week (matinee and evening performance, every day except Sunday) in variety theatres all over the country. The dance was performed to the 1875 composition Ballet égyptien by Alexandre Luigini, as arranged by Hoagy Carmichael.

Knox's daughter, Patsy Knox, took over as 'Betty' in May 1941, staying with the act until 1950. The trio, in its various line-ups, appeared at the Royal Variety Performance in 1933, 1945 and 1947. A fine example of the "Cleopatra's Nightmare" routine, including Patsy Knox, can be seen in the 1944 Harold Baim film Starlight Serenade, and the trio also appeared in Variety Jubilee in 1943.

In 1950 they appeared at the London Palladium on the same bill as Frank Sinatra. They toured all over the world, performing at shows in Britain, Europe, India, America, the Far East and Near East, Australia, Scandinavia and South Africa. They finally retired in 1962 after a performance in Great Yarmouth.

Betty Knox died in 1963 at her home in Düsseldorf in Germany, where she had lived since the end of World War II. Jack Wilson moved into Brinsworth House, a retirement home for showbusiness personalities in Twickenham, London, where he died in 1970. Joe Keppel died in St. Finbarr's Hospital in his native Cork in Ireland in 1977. Patsy Knox married Leo Gilchrist, and died in 1984 in Pearland, Texas, USA.

== Legacy ==
A pop art sculpture of the trio, The Sand Dancers made by Nicholas Monro for the Sands Hotel, Edinburgh, is now part of the Treadwell Collection. A simplified rendition of their sand dance was performed by Matt Berry and Harry Peacock in the 'Bob a Job' episode of Toast of London, broadcast on 9 December 2015. Steve Martin's "Funky Tut" routine, broadcast on "Saturday Night Live" on 22 April 1978, owes much to their sand dance.

A brief interpretation of the sand dance appeared in a Morecambe and Wise sketch featuring Dame Glenda Jackson as Cleopatra.

The trio's first biography, Wilson, Keppel and Betty: Too Naked for the Nazis by Alan Stafford, was published by Fantom Publishing in 2015. The book won the Bookseller/Diagram Prize for Oddest Title of the Year 2016.

== Other Bettys ==
George Melly, the celebrated jazz vocalist is quoted in his biography as saying "There were several Bettys, they would get rid of one after about 10 years." Melly was mistaken in this, as each dancer was part of the act for years or was on a short-term contract; all agreed, however, that Wilson and Keppel were a joy to work with. In addition to Betty (1928–1941) and Patsy Knox (1941–1950), the Bettys included Edna May Lark (who once stood in for Patsy Knox), Jean Bamberger (1933), Eunice Roberts (1941), Barbara Holt (1951), Irené Edwin-Scott (1951–1954), Mary Wemys (who appeared in the act in Las Vegas in 1954), Valerie Cottrell (1955–56), Maureen Drew (1956 and the first Betty to appear on television), and Jean McKinnon, who took over in 1956 and was the last Betty when the act broke up in 1962.
