= Jules Besson =

French painter

Jules Gustave Besson (1 August 1868 in Paris – ?) was a French painter. He was a pupil of Alexandre Cabanel, Élie Delaunay, and particularly Gustave Moreau at the Beaux-Arts, Paris, but did not follow his teacher's style.

In his fifties he moved to Indochina. He won the Prix de l'Indochine in 1925 and in 1926 succeeded André Joyeux as director of the école d'arts appliqués at Gia Dinh. His students in Saigon were not as numerous or as influential as those of his contemporary Victor Tardieu at the EBAI in Hanoi, but their works left a vivid record of life in the south of Vietnam and Cambodia. The school also encouraged the students in the art of photography. He was succeeded at the school by the third director, Stéphane Brecq (1894–1955).

== Works ==
- Au Pays Noir, 1898 - in the industrial English Black Country
