= Caroline Luigini =

French musician, harpist and professor

Caroline Luigini, called Câline, (2 November 1873 in Lyon – 1968 in Paris, aged 94) was a French musician, harpist and professor of harp of Italian origin, born from a family of musicians of Modena, who was the pupil of Camille Saint-Saëns.

== Biography ==
The daughter of composer and conductor Alexandre Luigini, Caroline Luigini married 2 July 1902 painter Victor Tardieu (1870–1937). She is the mother of writer and poet Jean Tardieu (1903–1995).

While she was the assistant of Alphonse Hasselmans, then professor of harp at the Conservatoire de Paris, she had Germaine Tailleferre of Les Six among her students, with whom she became a friend and who wrote for her Le petit livre de harpe de Madame Tardieu (1913–1917), a collection of eighteen short pieces for harp, which she used for her concerts and lessons.
