= Louis Rollet =

French painter (1895–1988)

Louis Marcel Edouard Rollet (3 May 1895 – 1988) was a French painter of the school of "peintres voyageurs" of the early 20th Century. He made many journeys in Asia and Africa and was particularly influential on local artists during his stay in Madagascar, more so than his compatriot Maurice Le Scouézec (1881–1940).

== Biography ==
He was born in 6e arrondissement, Paris. He was the son of Charles Constant Rollet, an engraver and geographer, and Marie Louise Madon.

Louis Rollet studied under Fernand Cormon, Charles Fouqueray, Jules Adler, Alphonse Bertillon, Jean-Paul Laurens, and Joseph Bergès.

He began exhibiting at the Salon des Artistes Français in 1921, where he won a gold medal; at the Salon des indépendants starting in 1926; and at the Salon de la Société Coloniale des Artistes Français.

He won the Indochina Prize in 1930 and the Margherita Pillini in 1935.

He died in 1988 in Saché.
