= Ballet égyptien =

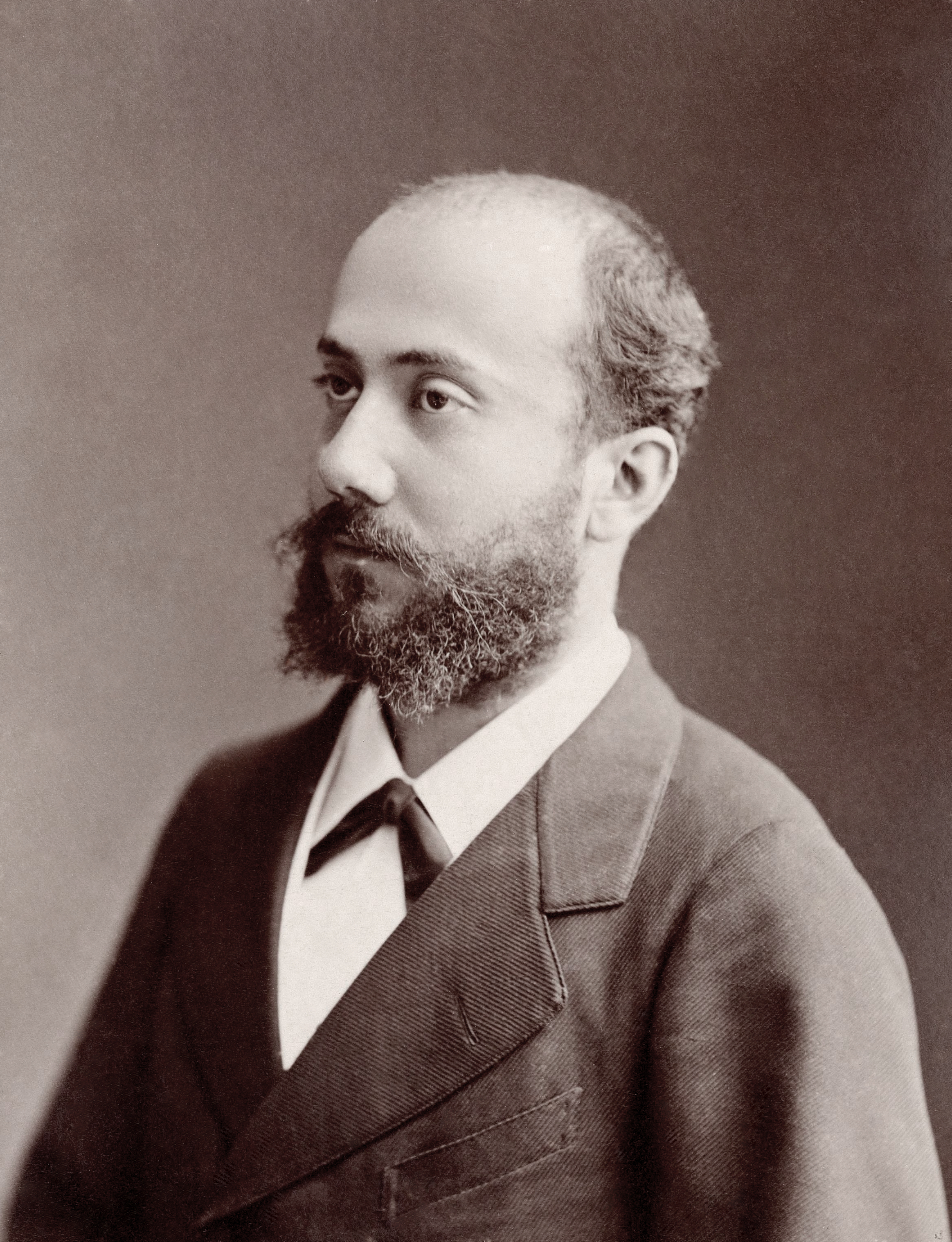
Alexandre Luigini, ca. 1880

Ballet égyptien, Op. 12 (1875), is Alexandre Luigini's best-known composition and the only one of his works in the standard repertoire. It was dedicated to Jules Pasdeloup. The ballet consists of eight movements, from which two different concert suites have been extracted. The first suite is the better known.

It originally gained prominence when it was included in Act II of Giuseppe Verdi's opera Aida for a performance in Lyon in 1886. The fame of the piece inspired Luigini to write other pieces on exotic themes, such as Ballet russe, Marche d'émir, and symphonic poems Fête arabe, Op. 49 and Carnaval turc, Op. 51.

Ballet égyptien has been arranged for piano solo, 2 pianos 4-hands and 2 pianos 8-hands, as well as for brass band.

It has been recorded numerous times, by conductors such as Anatole Fistoulari, John Lanchbery, Jean Fournet and Richard Bonynge. It often appears in compilations of light music.

It is perhaps best known as the background music used by the British music hall act Wilson, Keppel and Betty for their "sand dance". It also appears as music in 1930's Arctic Antics.
