= Lucien Lièvre =

French painter

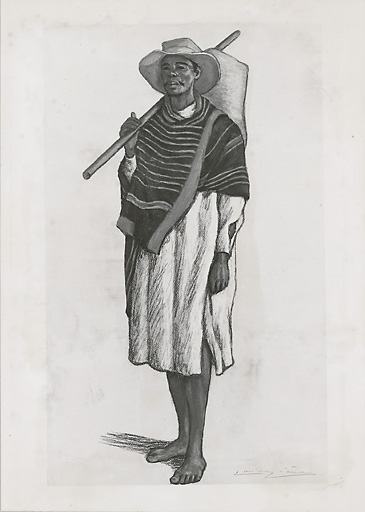
Drawing of a Betsileo man, Madagascar

Lucien Lièvre (Paris, 1878-1936) was a French painter. He competed for and won the Grand Prix de Madagascar and Prix de l'Indochine, with residencies and bursaries in both countries. He was appointed a Chevalier of the Légion d'honneur.
