= Betty Knox =

American dancer and journalist (1906–1963)

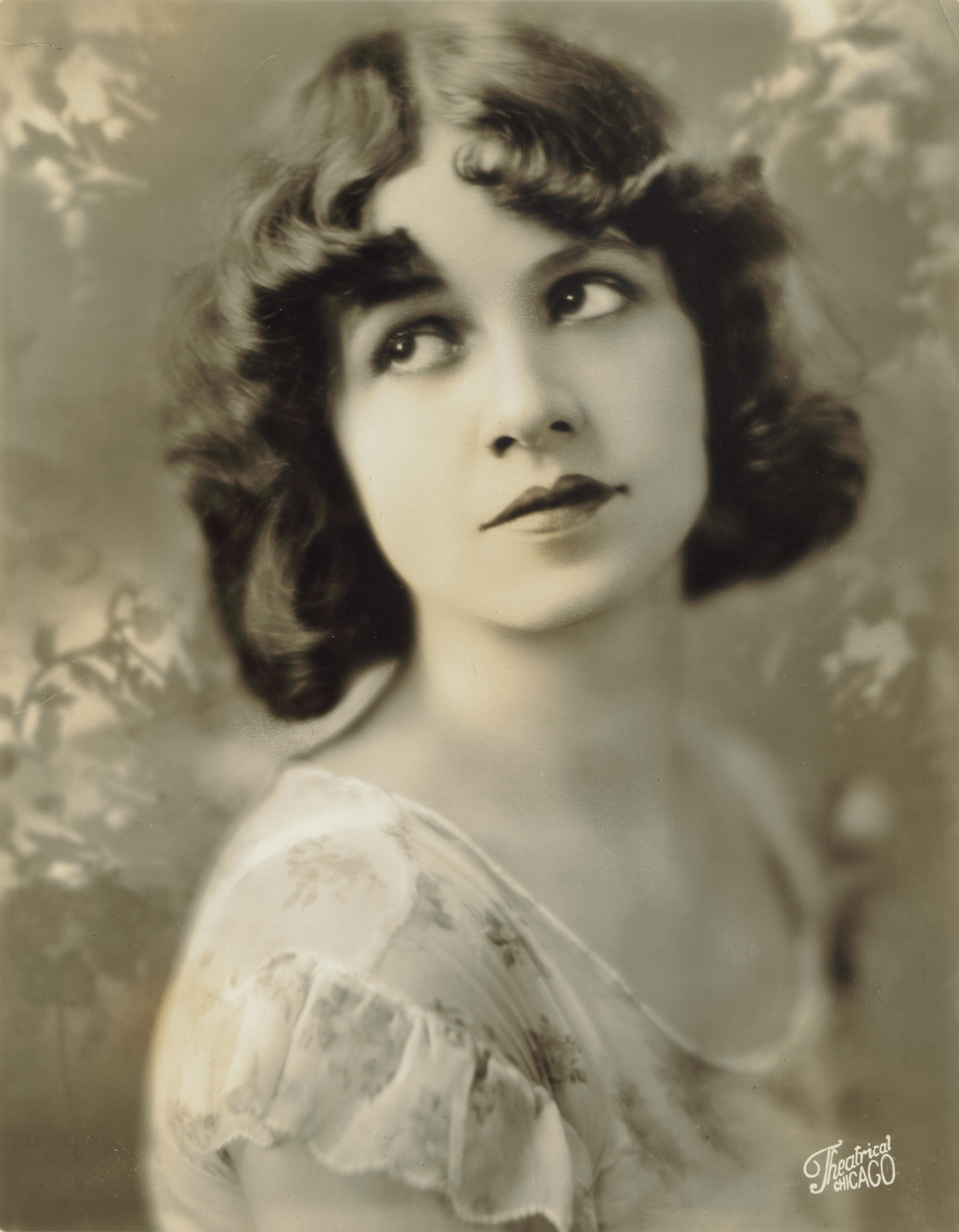
Betty Knox in a 1928 publicity still shortly after the formation of dance trio Wilson, Keppel and Betty.

Betty Knox (10 May 1906 – 25 January 1963) was an American dancer and journalist. Her early career was in American vaudeville and British variety as the original ‘Betty’ (1928–1941) of Wilson, Keppel and Betty – a dance trio who performed slick comedy routines in Egyptian dress, including the Sand Dance and the Dance of the Seven Veils. When she retired from dancing, she became a journalist for the London Evening Standard and was subsequently a war correspondent in Normandy and a reporter at the Nuremberg trials.

== Early life ==
Knox was born Alice Elizabeth Peden in Salina, Kansas, on 10 May 1906, the daughter of Charley E. Peden and Elizabeth Jane (née Anderson). As a teenager, she ran away from home twice. Aged 16, she fled to Louisiana, fearing arrest after a joyriding incident with a borrowed car. Less than a year later, she eloped with boyfriend Donald Knox to obtain a marriage licence in Omaha, Nebraska. Their daughter Patsy was born in December 1923, though the marriage (if it ever happened) was short-lived.

== Dancing career ==
Wilson, Keppel and Betty photographed in 1928

After several years working as a chorus girl in vaudeville, Knox met Liverpudlian Jack Wilson and Irishman Joe Keppel, a clog dancing double act. She joined the act in 1928 and the trio became known as Wilson, Keppel and Betty. Over the next couple of years, they tried out various new routines, before coming up with the idea of wearing Egyptian costumes and performing eccentric dancing in a comic imitation of hieroglyphic wall paintings. This rapidly propelled them to the top of their profession and the trio moved to the UK in 1932, making their British début at the London Palladium.

In 1935, with Wilson and Keppel, she had danced at the Berlin Wintergarten theatre before an audience that included Hermann Göring, commander of the Luftwaffe. The act was condemned by Joseph Goebbels as indecent.

Knox left her daughter Patsy behind in America, finally bringing her to the UK in late 1937, in Knox's own words, 'so that she could see the war.' In addition to helping to devise new routines for Wilson, Keppel and Betty, Knox also scripted sketches and lyrics for several other variety acts, particularly Tessie O'Shea, for whom she wrote one of her most successful wartime songs, International Rhythm.

== Journalism ==
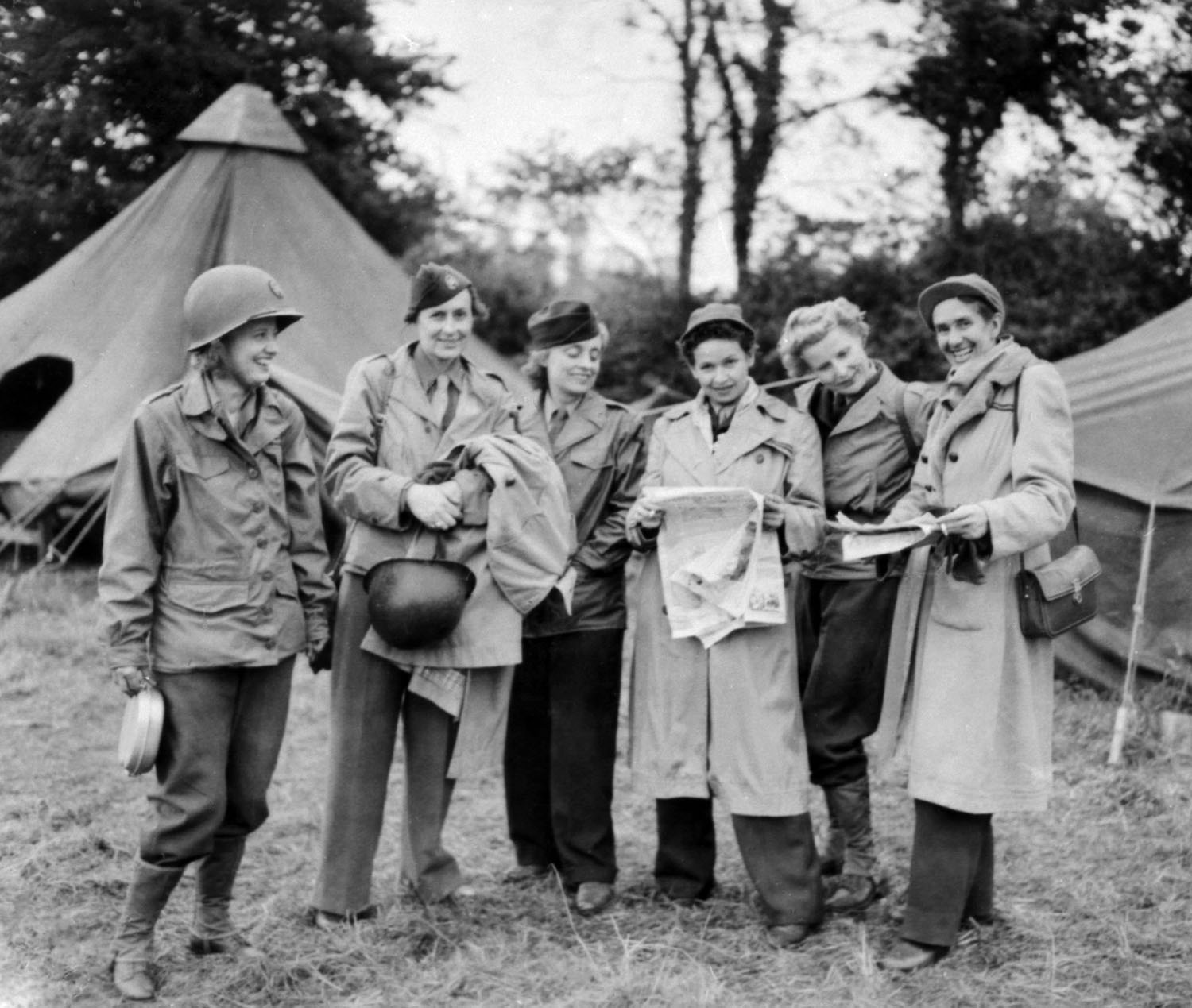
Betty Knox (third from right) in 1944 as a war correspondent for the London Evening Standard

In 1941, Knox retired from the act and became a journalist on the London Evening Standard. Although she was totally untrained in the profession, editor Frank Owen was impressed by her extensive knowledge of Britain and the British, gained by her natural curiosity and her non-stop touring lifestyle. Her daughter Patsy subsequently became the new 'Betty' in the dance trio.

In 1943, Michael Foot (Owen's successor as Evening Standard editor, and future leader of the Labour Party) gave Knox her own thrice-weekly column, which she titled Over Here, celebrating the contrasting cultures of the British and the increasingly prevalent American GI (the title was a reference to the popular description of American servicemen – 'overpaid, oversexed and over here'). Her first column featured an interview with novelist John Steinbeck, who had recently returned from Capri where he was war correspondent with the United States Navy. Her columns were peppered with humorous anecdotes and American slang, and frequently poked fun at the inability of the British to make a proper cup of coffee.

== Second World War and Nuremberg trials ==
Knox in her war correspondent's uniform in 1944

In July 1944, Knox filed her first story from Normandy, as a US war correspondent working for the London Evening Standard. In common with most female war correspondents, she was expected to cover the war from a woman’s angle – with on-the-spot reports from military hospitals and articles on food shortages. However, she often bent the rules, and on one occasion, hitched a ride with the French Resistance and went Nazi hunting. During this period, she worked closely with fellow war correspondent Erika Mann (the eldest child of novelist Thomas Mann) and the couple were briefly romantically involved.

After the war, Knox stayed in Germany reporting from the Nuremberg trials. As a journalist in Nuremberg she covered Göring’s trial, but her reputation suffered after she chose to ignore a tip-off that Göring had committed suicide in his cell. The following year, in July 1947, an article Knox wrote for the London Evening Standard, claiming that escaped Nazi war criminal Martin Bormann was alive and living in Russia, provoked interest from MI5. Freda Utley's book The High Cost of Vengeance (1948) was highly critical of the conduct of the Nuremberg trials, especially the subsequent trials of those further down the chain of command. Utley spoke to Knox, who had transcribed the last words of three prisoners and (together with fellow journalist Josie Thompson) witnessed their executions. According to Utley, neither Knox nor Thompson "were ever likely to forget their terrible experience".

== Later years ==
By the early 1950s, Knox was running the Press Villa Club, an international press club in Bonn. She later wrote articles for various Canadian newspapers. In her final years, she lived in Düsseldorf with her mother Lizzie and her daughter Patsy. She died in a hospital in Düsseldorf on 25 January 1963, aged 56, from emphysema, carcinoma, and pulmonary trouble.
