= Louis Bate =

French sculptor

Louis Robert Bate (10 October 1898, in Bordeaux – 1948 in Da Lat) was a French sculptor, as was his wife Juliette Briet-Bate. He was a pupil of Jules Coutan and Paul Landowski and a member of the Société Coloniale des Artistes Français and won in succession, second prize of the Prix de Rome in 1927, bursary for residence at the Villa Velázquez Madrid in 1932, bursary for French Equatorial Africa, Prix de Guadeloupe in 1935, and Prix de l'Indochine in 1938. In Indochina he gained permanent employment at the school of architecture in Dalat till his death aged 50.

== Works ==
- Ta Kouan Leo-Yunnan, 1940
