= Prix de l'Indochine =

The Prix de l'Indochine (1914, 1920–1938) was a French colonial art prize established, originally as a one-off prize in 1910, and awarded 1914, by Antony Klobukowski, Gouverneur général of Indochina. Charles Fouqueray obtained le prix Indochine 1914. From 1925 the prize was associated with the École des Beaux-Arts de l'Indochine.

== Winners ==
Subsequent winners included Victor Tardieu (1920), Paul Jouve (1921), Antoine Ponchin (1922), Jean Bouchaud (1924), Jules Besson (1925), (Note: "Il obtient le prix Indochine à l'âge de 57 ans (1925), année où pour la première fois le titulaire du prix doit assurer une année d'enseignement à la nouvelle Ecole des Beaux-Arts de l'Indochine. Son séjour en Indochine se prolonge :..") Paul-Émile Legouez (1926), Raymond Virac (1927), Henri Dabadie (1928), Lucien Lièvre (1929), Louis Rollet (1930), Évariste Jonchère (1932), Jean Despujols (1936) and Louis Bate (1938). In certain years, such as 1935 and 1937, no prize was awarded.

These winners were not required to paint scenes from Asia, which they had usually not visited prior to winning the prize. For example, Henri Dabadie, having travelled at his own expenses in Algeria, without having won the coveted Prix Abd-el-Tif for a residence at the Villa Abd-el-Tif, entered a painting of the Bay of Tunis into competition at the Salon de la Société coloniale des Artistes français in 1928, which won him the Prix de l'Indochine, including free passage to Indochina, and a period of employment at EBAI in Hanoi. (Note: "Il participe à l'exposition coloniale de Marseille en 1922 au sein de la Société des Peintres orientalistes. La Baie de Tunis, exposé au Salon de la Société coloniale des Artistes français en 1928, lui vaut le prix Indochine.. Il s'embarque donc pour de nouveaux horizons. Tout en enseignant à l'Ecole des Beaux-Arts de l'Indochine à Hanoi, il voyage à travers tout le pays pendant ses moments de loisir et envoie ses toiles à la Société coloniale des Artistes français ") Many of these artists were not primarily associated with Indochina, having also won the Prix Abd-el-Tif, with a residency in Algiers, in which case classed as "peintres Africanistes," or a bursary at the Villa Velázquez, Madrid.
