= Les Six =

Group of French composers

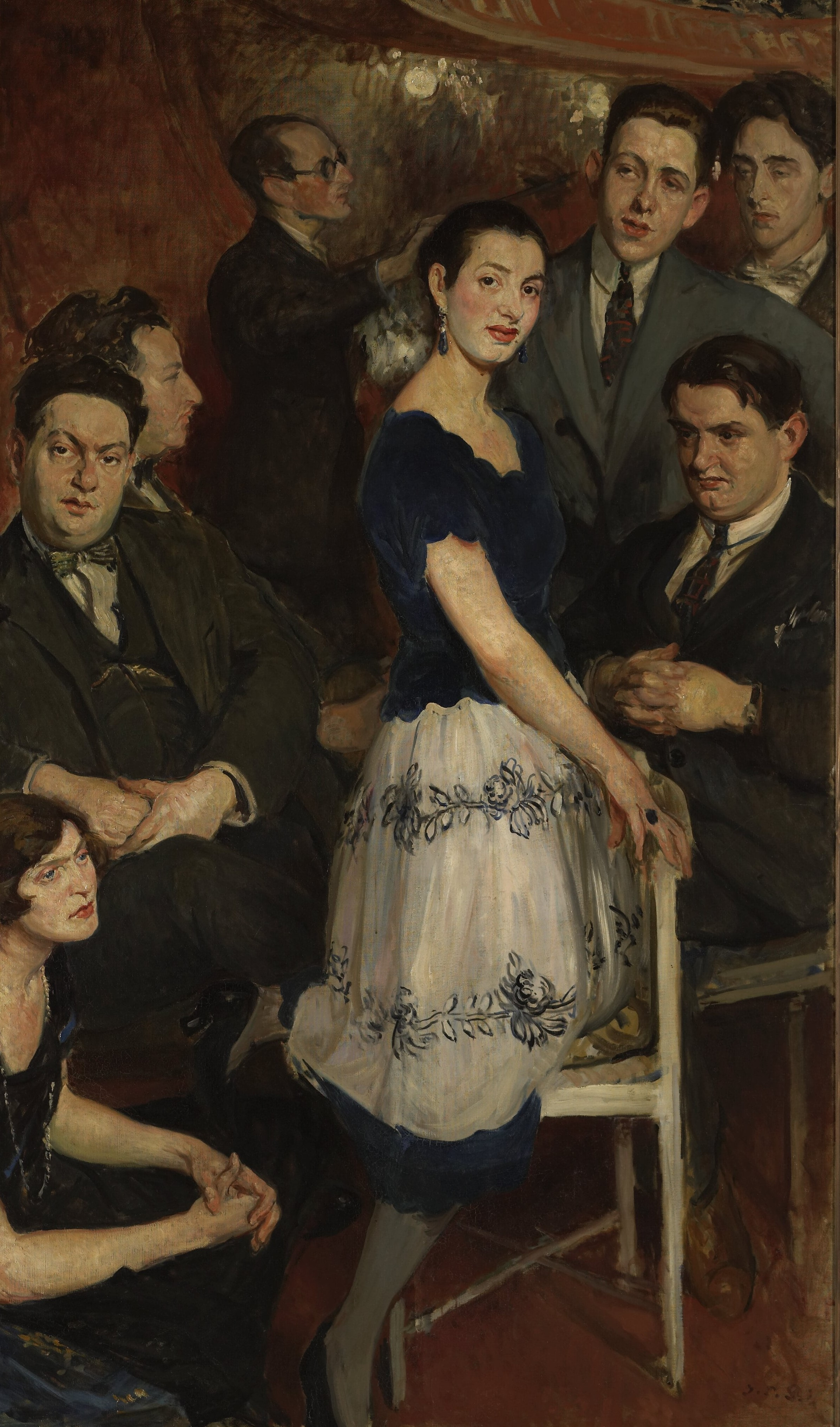
Le Groupe des six, 1922, painting by Jacques-Émile Blanche. In this painting of eight people, only five of Les Six are represented; Louis Durey was not present. In the centre: pianist Marcelle Meyer. On the left, from bottom to top: Germaine Tailleferre, Darius Milhaud, Arthur Honegger, Jean Wiener. On the right, standing Francis Poulenc, Jean Cocteau; and seated Georges Auric.

"Les Six" (French: [le sis]) is a name given to a group of six composers, five of them French and one Swiss, who lived and worked in Montparnasse. The name has its origins in two 1920 articles by composer and critic Henri Collet in Comœdia (see Bibliography). Their music is often seen as a neoclassic reaction against both the musical style of Richard Wagner and the Impressionist music of Claude Debussy and Maurice Ravel.

The members were Georges Auric (1899–1983), Louis Durey (1888–1979), Arthur Honegger (1892–1955), Darius Milhaud (1892–1974), Francis Poulenc (1899–1963), and Germaine Tailleferre (1892–1983).

== Les nouveaux jeunes ==
In 1917, when many theatres and concert halls were closed because of World War I, Blaise Cendrars and the painter Moïse Kisling decided to put on concerts at 6 rue Huyghens, the studio of the painter Émile Lejeune (1885–1964). For the first of these events, the walls of the studio were decorated with canvases by Picasso, Matisse, Léger, Modigliani, and others. Music by Erik Satie, Honegger, Auric, and Durey was played. This concert gave Satie the idea of assembling a group of composers around himself to be known as Les nouveaux jeunes, forerunners of Les Six. Soon after, Honegger suggested that Milhaud should be a part of the group, and a famous Spanish pianist named Ricardo Viñes introduced Poulenc to the group. Later, Germaine Tailleferre was slowly incorporated into the group, thus establishing Les Six.

== Les Six ==
According to Milhaud:

[Collet] chose six names absolutely arbitrarily, those of Auric, Durey, Honegger, Poulenc, Tailleferre and me simply because we knew each other and we were pals and appeared on the same musical programmes, no matter if our temperaments and personalities weren't at all the same! Auric and Poulenc followed ideas of Cocteau, Honegger followed German Romanticism, and myself, Mediterranean lyricism!

— Ivry 1996

And according to Poulenc:

The diversity of our music, of our tastes and distastes, precluded any common aesthetic. What could be more different than the music of Honegger and Auric? Milhaud admired Magnard, I did not; neither of us liked Florent Schmitt, whom Honegger respected; Arthur [Honegger] on the other hand had a deep-seated scorn for Satie, whom Auric, Milhaud and I adored.

— Quoted in Mark Amory, Lord Berners: The Last Eccentric, 1998, ch. VI

But, that is only one reading of how the Groupe des Six originated. Other authors, like Ornella Volta, stressed the manoeuvrings of Jean Cocteau to become the leader of an avant-garde group devoted to music, like the cubist and surrealist groups which had sprung up in visual arts and literature shortly before, with Pablo Picasso, Guillaume Apollinaire, and André Breton as their key representatives. The fact that Satie had abandoned the Nouveaux jeunes less than a year after starting the group, was the "gift from heaven" that made it all come true for Cocteau: his 1918 publication, Le Coq et l'Arlequin, is said to have kicked it off.

After World War I, Jean Cocteau and Les Six began to frequent a bar known as "La Gaya" which became Le Bœuf sur le toit (The Ox on the Roof) when the establishment moved to larger quarters. As the famous ballet by Milhaud had been conceived at the old premises, the new bar took on the name of Milhaud's ballet. On the renamed bar's opening night, pianist Jean Wiéner played tunes by George Gershwin and Vincent Youmans while Cocteau and Milhaud played percussion. Among those in attendance were impresario Serge Diaghilev, artist Pablo Picasso, filmmaker René Clair, singer Jane Bathori, and actor and singer Maurice Chevalier. Another frequent guest was the young American composer Virgil Thomson whose compositions in subsequent years were influenced by members of Les Six.

== Collaborations ==
Although the group did not exist to work on compositions collaboratively, there were six occasions, spread over 36 years, on which at least some members of the group did work together on the same project. On only one of these occasions was the entire Groupe des Six involved; in some others, composers from outside the group also participated.

Auric and Poulenc were involved in all six of these collaborations, Milhaud in five, Honegger and Tailleferre in three, but Durey in only one.

=== 1920: L'Album des Six ===
In 1920 the group published an album of piano pieces together, known as L'Album des Six. This was the only work in which all six composers collaborated.

1. Prélude (1919) – Auric
2. Romance sans paroles, Op. 21 (1919) – Durey
3. Sarabande, H 26 (1920) – Honegger
4. Mazurka (1914) – Milhaud
5. Valse in C, FP 17 (1919) – Poulenc
6. Pastorale, Enjoué (1919) – Tailleferre

=== 1921: Les mariés de la tour Eiffel ===
In 1921, five of the members jointly composed the music for Cocteau's ballet Les mariés de la tour Eiffel, which was produced by the Ballets suédois, the rival to the Ballets Russes. Cocteau had originally proposed the project to Auric, but as Auric did not finish rapidly enough to fit into the rehearsal schedule, he then divided the work up among the other members of Les Six. Durey, who was not in Paris at the time, chose not to participate. The première was the occasion of a public scandal rivalling that of Le sacre du printemps in 1913. In spite of this, Les mariés de la tour Eiffel was in the repertoire of the Ballets suédois throughout the 1920s.

1. Overture (14 July) – Auric
2. Marche nuptiale – Milhaud
3. Discours du General (Polka) – Poulenc
4. La Baigneuse de Trouville – Poulenc
5. La Fugue du Massacre – Milhaud
6. La Valse des Depeches – Tailleferre
7. Marche funèbre – Honegger
8. Quadrille – Tailleferre
9. Ritournelles – Auric
10. Sortie de la Noce – Milhaud

=== 1927: L'éventail de Jeanne ===
In 1927, Auric, Milhaud and Poulenc, along with seven other composers who were not part of Les Six, jointly composed the children's ballet L'éventail de Jeanne.

1. Fanfare – Maurice Ravel
2. Marche – Pierre-Octave Ferroud
3. Valse – Jacques Ibert
4. Canarie – Alexis Roland-Manuel
5. Bourrée – Marcel Delannoy
6. Sarabande – Albert Roussel
7. Polka – Milhaud
8. Pastourelle – Poulenc
9. Rondeau – Auric
10. Finale: Kermesse-Valse – Florent Schmitt

=== 1949: Mouvements du coeur ===
In 1949, Auric, Milhaud and Poulenc, along with three other composers, jointly wrote Mouvements du coeur: Un hommage à la mémoire de Frédéric Chopin, 1810–1849, a suite of songs for baritone or bass and piano on words of Louise Lévêque de Vilmorin in commemoration of the centenary of the death of Frédéric Chopin.

1. Prélude – Henri Sauguet
2. Mazurka – Poulenc
3. Valse – Auric
4. Scherzo impromptu – Jean Françaix
5. Étude – Léo Preger
6. Ballade nocturne – Milhaud
7. Postlude: Polonaise – Henri Sauguet

=== 1952: La Guirlande de Campra ===
In 1952, Auric, Honegger, Poulenc, Tailleferre and three other composers collaborated on an orchestral work called La Guirlande de Campra.

1. Toccata – Honegger
2. Sarabande et farandole – Daniel Lesur
3. Canarie – Alexis Roland-Manuel
4. Sarabande – Tailleferre
5. Matelote provençale – Poulenc
6. Variation – Henri Sauguet
7. Écossaise – Auric

=== 1956: Variations sur le nom de Marguerite Long ===
In 1956, Auric, Milhaud, Poulenc and five other composers created an orchestral suite in honour of the pianist Marguerite Long, called Variations sur le nom de Marguerite Long

1. Hymne solennel – Jean Françaix
2. Variations en forme de Berceuse pour Marguerite Long – Henri Sauguet
3. La Couronne de Marguerites ("The Crown of Daisies"), Valse en forme de rondo – Milhaud
4. Nocturne – Jean Rivier
5. Sérénades – Henri Dutilleux
6. Intermezzo – Daniel Lesur
7. Bucolique, FP. 160 – Poulenc
8. ML (Allegro: Finale) – Auric

== Selected music by individual members of Les Six ==
- Salade by Milhaud; premiered 1924 in a production of Count Etienne de Beaumont
- La nouvelle Cythère by Tailleferre; written in 1929 for the Ballets Russes and unproduced because of Diaghilev's sudden death
- Cinq bagatelles by Auric
- Les biches, ballet (1922/23) by Poulenc
- Le Bal Masqué, cantate profane sur des poèmes de Max Jacob (Baritone, ensemble) (1932) by Poulenc
- Scaramouche by Milhaud
- Le Bœuf sur le toit by Milhaud
- Sonate pour violon seul by Honegger
- Danse de la chèvre (Dance of the Goat) for solo flute by Honegger
- Sonate champêtre for Oboe, Clarinet, Bassoon and Piano by Tailleferre

== See also ==
- American Five
- The Five (composers)
- Grupo de los Ocho

== Bibliography ==
- Jean Cocteau: Le Coq et l'Arlequin: Notes autour de la musique (Paris: Éditions de la Sirène, 1918).
- Henri Collet: "La Musique chez soi (XII): Un livre de Rimsky et un livre de Cocteau – Les Cinq russes, les Six français, et Erik Satie", in: Comœdia, 16 January 1920, p. 2.
- Henri Collet: "La Musique chez soi (XIII): "Les 'Six' français – Darius Milhaud, Louis Durey, Georges Auric, Arthur Honegger, Francis Poulenc et Germaine Tailleferre", in: Comœdia, 23 January 1920, p. 2.
- Eveline Hurard-Viltard: Le Groupe des Six ou le matin d’un jour de fête. (Paris: Méridiens Klincksieck, 1987) ISBN 2-907523-01-5.
- Fondation Erik Satie (ed.): Le Groupe des Six et ses amis: 70e anniversaire (Paris: Placard, 1990), ISBN 2-907523-01-5.
- Ornella Volta: Satie/Cocteau. Les Malentendus d'une entente (Bègles: Le Castor Astral, 1993), ISBN 2-85920-208-0.
- Benjamin Ivry: Francis Poulenc (London: Phaidon Press, 1996), ISBN 0-7148-3503-X.
- Roger Nichols: The Harlequin Years: Music in Paris 1917–1929 (London: Thames & Hudson, 2002), ISBN 0-500-51095-4.
- Robert Shapiro: Les Six: The French Composers and their Mentors Jean Cocteau and Erik Satie (London/Chicago: Peter Owen, 2011), ISBN 978-0-7206-1293-6.
- Jane F. Fulcher: The Composer as Intellectual. Music and Ideology in France, 1914–1940 (New York: Oxford University Press, 2005).
- Barbara L. Kelly: Music and Ultra-Modernism in France, a Fragile Consensus, 1913–1939 (Woodbridge: Boydell Press, 2013).
