= Julien Gustave Gagliardini =

French painter

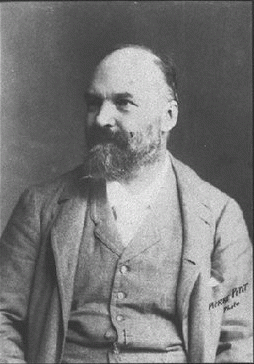
Julien Gustave Gagliardini; photograph by Pierre Petit (c.1900)

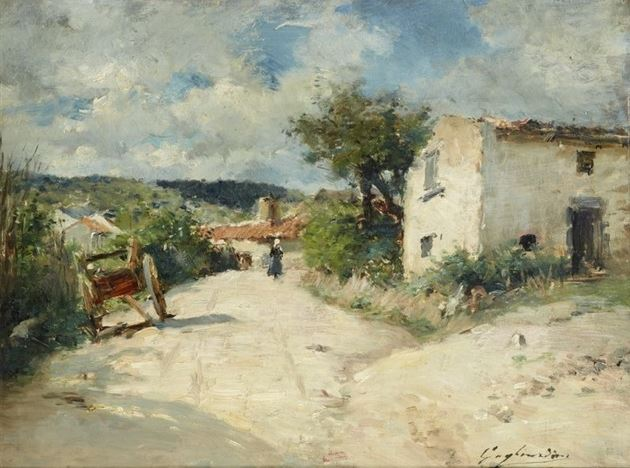
Landscape in Southern France

Julien Gustave Gaillardin, known as Julien Gustave Gagliardini (1 March 1846, Mulhouse – 28 November 1927, Paris) was a French Impressionist landscape painter and engraver.

== Biography ==
His family was originally from Italy. He began as a student of the history painter, Claude Soulary, then worked in the studios of Léon Cogniet at the École des Beaux-Arts in Paris. His first exhibit at the Salon came in 1869, with a series of genre scenes and portraits.

By the 1880s, he had abandoned those subjects and was devoting himself entirely to landscapes. He quickly developed a preference for Auvergne and the south of France; areas that would remain his favorites for the rest of his life. While working there, he became a close friend of François Nardi, another French artist of Italian ancestry, who encouraged him to use the original form of his family name.

He benefitted from several major government purchases, in 1880, 1891 and 1913. After being awarded several second and third class medals, he was the recipient of a silver medal at the Exposition Universelle (1889) and a gold medal at the Exposition Universelle (1900). He was named a Knight in the Legion of Honor in 1893.

His works may be seen at the Musée d'Évreux, Musée des Beaux-Arts de Marseille, Musée d'Art Moderne André Malraux, Musée Baron Gérard and the Musée Gassendi.
