= Évariste Jonchère =

French sculptor

Évariste Jonchère (8 July 1892, in Coulonges-les-Hérolles, Vienne – 1956, in Paris) was a French sculptor.

He studied with Antonin Mercié and Jean Boucher at the École nationale supérieure des beaux-arts, then received the Grand Prix de Rome for sculpture in 1925. Winning the Prix de l'Indochine in 1932 took him for two years to Vietnam, then Manchuria, Japan, San Francisco and Newfoundland. Back in Paris he exhibited at the Exposition universelle of 1937.

From 1938 to 1944, he was director of the École des Beaux Arts de l'Indochine in Hanoi.
