= Sonate champêtre =

Chamber work by Germaine Tailleferre

The Sonate champêtre (English: Rustic Sonata or Outdoor Sonata) is a chamber work for oboe, B♭ clarinet, bassoon and piano written by Germaine Tailleferre in 1972. The work was published in 2003 by the French publishers Musik Fabrik.

The work is dedicated to the composer's friend and Colleague Henri Sauguet, who had arranged for Tailleferre to spend a month at the Chateau de Rondon in Brittany, which was run by the SACD (the French Dramatic Rights Organization) which he presided. Written in three movements, the work lasts about twelve minutes to perform.

1. Allegro Moderato
2. Andantino
3. Allegro vivace: Gaiement

The first and second movements use themes from Tailleferre's 1951 Comic Opera Il était un petit navire. A version for Violin (oboe), Viola, Violoncello and Piano has been performed by the Ambache ensemble during 2005.

A version for three winds and string orchestra, cited by Georges Hacquard in "Germaine Tailleferre: La Dame des Six" (L'Harmattan, 1997) as the work of Germaine Tailleferre has been proven to be the work of Michel Rothenbühler, a music teacher at the Ecole Alsacienne where Mr. Hacquard was head-master. This version has been withdrawn.

The premiere recording of Sonate champêtre was released in February 2023 by the Tailleferre Ensemble. https://open.spotify.com/album/0C1HmkgwtDTFMvDF9aXAlh
