= Alexandre Luigini =

French composer and conductor

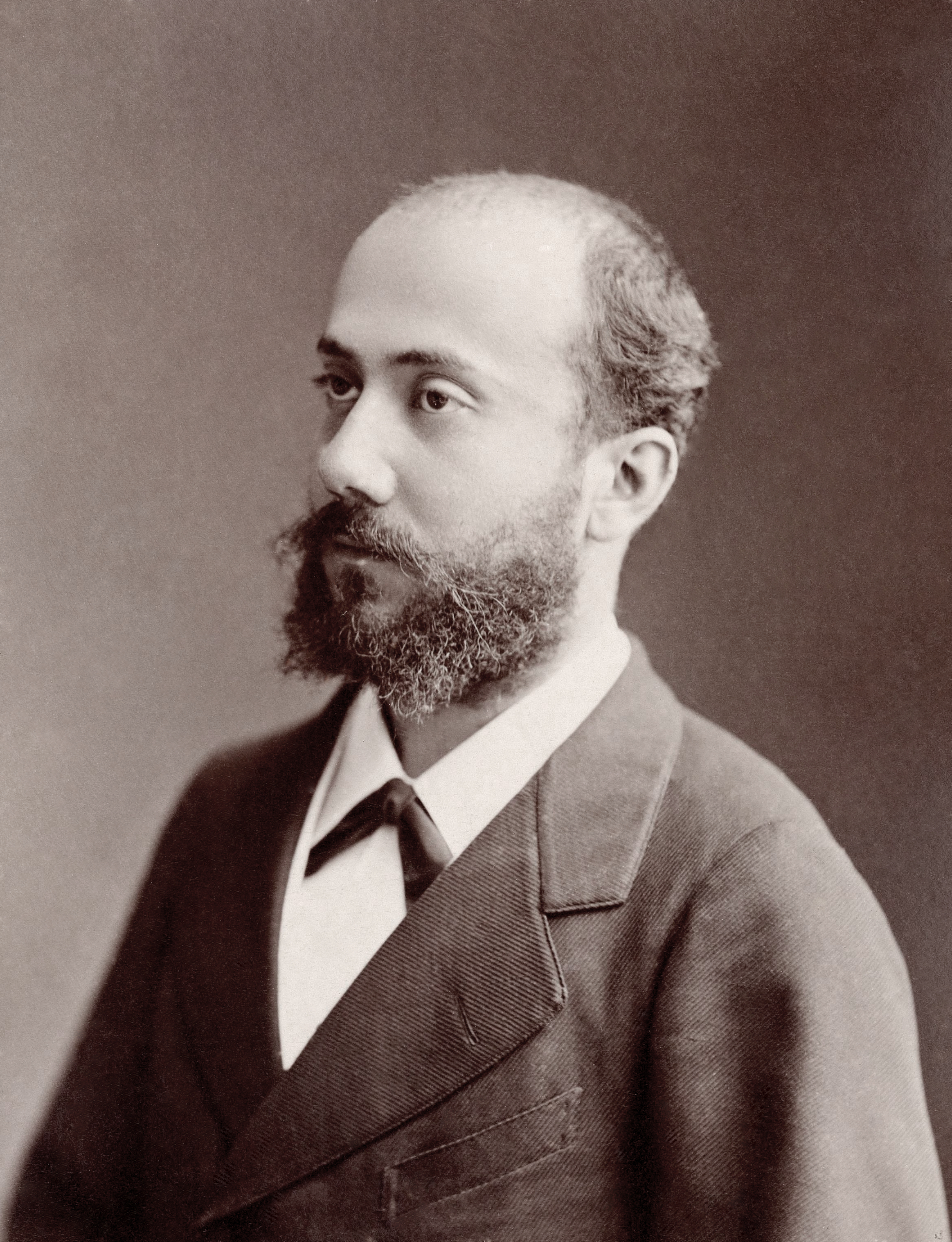
Alexandre Luigini, ca 1880, by Nadar, Bibliothèque nationale de France

Alexandre Clément Léon Joseph Luigini (9 March 1850 – 29 July 1906) was a French composer and conductor, especially active in the opera house. As a composer, he is now remembered almost solely for his Ballet égyptien.

== Life and career ==
Luigini was born in Lyon in 1850. His grandparents had moved to Lyon from Modena, Italy, when his grandfather took up the post of trumpeter with the orchestra of the Grand Théâtre. Alexandre Luigini was brought up with music, his father Joseph also playing with, and later conducting, the orchestra of the Grand Théâtre. He was the nephew of César and (another) Alexandre Luigini, both noted instrumentalists. His daughter was the harpist Caroline Luigini, who married the painter Victor Tardieu. His grandson is the poet Jean Tardieu.

After studying at the Conservatoire in Paris where he gained a second prize for violin, Luigini returned to Lyon and from 1872 played as a violinist in the theatre orchestra, which he went on to lead, becoming conductor in 1877. As resident conductor he was also expected to meet the compositional demands of the theatre, leading to a number of ballets, operas and orchestral suites. In 1879 he was appointed professor of harmony and composition at the Conservatory of Lyon.

In 1897 he left Lyon to take up the conductorship of the Opéra-Comique in Paris, and led a busy life until his sudden death there in 1906. At the Opéra-Comique he notably conducted the world premiere of Jules Massenet's Cendrillon on 24 May 1899. The other premieres he conducted were Aphrodite 1906, Enfant roi 1905, Le Juif polonais 1900, Miarka 1905, Muguette 1903, and L'Ouragan 1901. He also supervised revivals of Alceste, Falstaff, Fidelio, Le Roi d’Ys and The Flying Dutchman, among others. Paris premieres conducted by Luigini included Chérubin, Hélène, Le jongleur de Notre-Dame and the first staging of Marie-Madeleine.

As a theatre conductor he followed the old practice of having his conductor’s stand directly against the prompt box.

Luigini's Ballet égyptien (1875) is his best known work, gaining great popularity in the early 20th century as a concert suite. It originally gained prominence when it was included in the second act of Verdi's Aida for a performance in Lyon in 1886.

His compositions reflect his stage-orchestra background, being mostly light music for ballet and operas: Ange et démon, Le Rêve de Nicette, Les Caprices de Margot (one-act opéra comique, Lyon, 1877), Reine des fleurs, Fleurs et papillons, Les Écharpes, Le Meunier, Arlequin écolier, Faublas (three-act operetta, Théâtre Cluny, Paris, 1881). He also composed a number of songs and works for string quartet and other chamber groups.
