= Jean Tardieu =

French artist, musician, poet and dramatic author

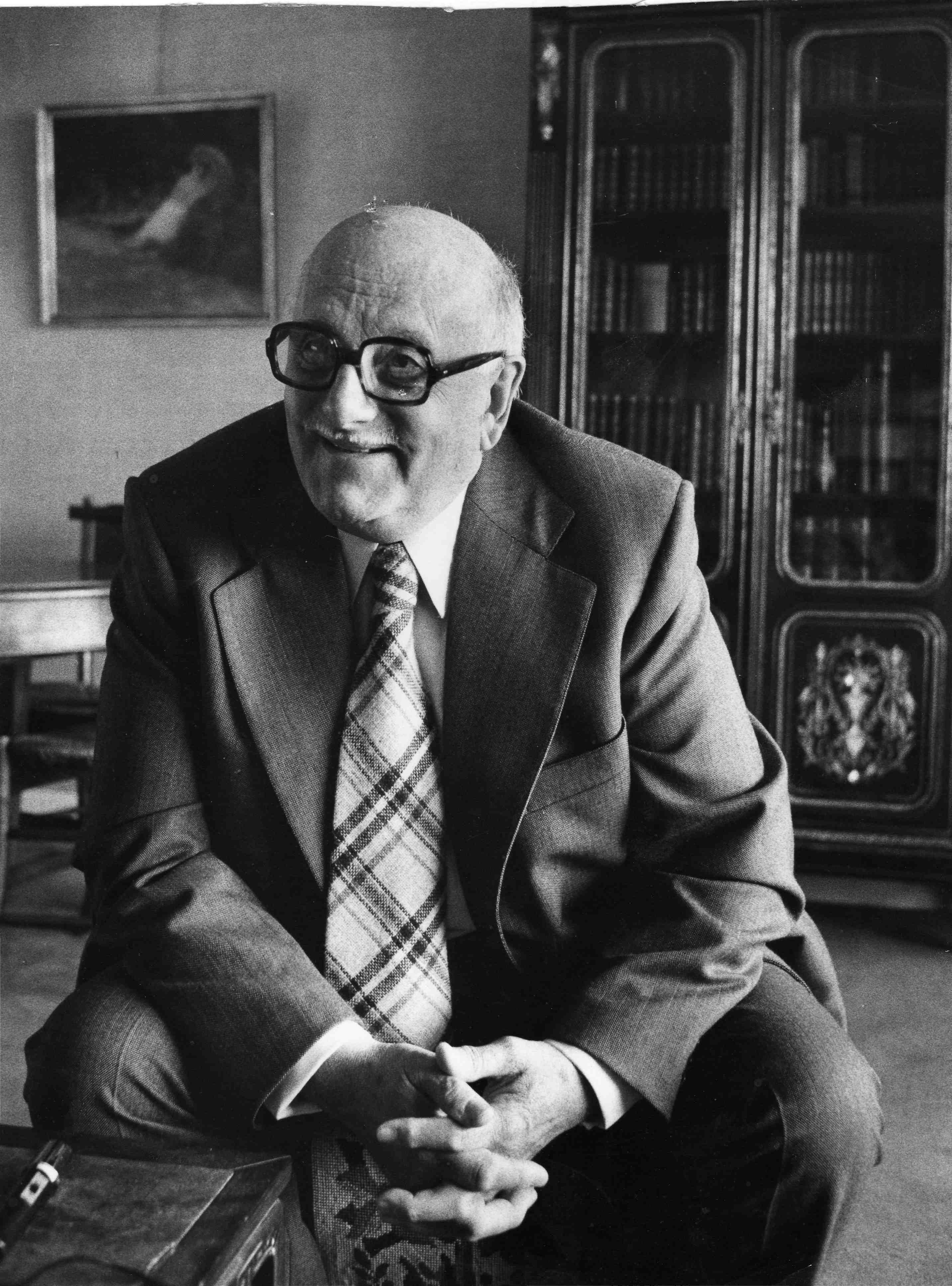
Jean Tardieu

Jean Tardieu (French pronunciation: [ʒɑ̃ taʁdjø]; born in Saint-Germain-de-Joux, Ain, 1 November 1903, died in Créteil, Val-de-Marne, 27 January 1995) was a French artist, musician, poet and dramatic author.

== Life and career ==
He earned a degree in literature and worked for a publishing house. He published several poetry collections in the 1930s before starting to write for the stage. After World War II, Tardieu entered the world of radio becoming head of dramatic programming and then director of programs at France-Music.

He was married to pteridologist Marie Laure Tardieu.

Tardieu's works mingled with the ideals of the French New Theatre and used comedy to pick apart more traditional theatre. He is often associated with the Theatre of the Absurd.

Some of his work has been translated into English, including:

- The Underground Lovers, and other experimental plays
- Going...Going...Gone! The Client Dies Twice: Three Plays (Black Apollo Press, ISBN 1-900355-21-3)
- The River Underground: Selected Poems & Prose

Some of his work is present in Julio Cortázar's 1963 novel Rayuela (Hopscotch). Tardieu's work is included in Chapter 152, entitled "The Abuse of Consciousness".

The end of his poem «Monsieur interroge Monsieur» is quoted in Jean-Luc Godard's Film Socialisme.

The French composer Germaine Tailleferre of Les Six, who was a harp student of Tardieu's mother Caroline Luigini and who first met Tardieu as a child, set several of Tardieu's poems to music notably in the "Concerto des Vaines Paroles" for Baritone Voice, Piano and Orchestra and in the cycle "Trois Poèmes de Jean Tardieu" for Voice and Piano.

He was a friend to Jean René Bazaine who turned his poem L'Ombre, la branche into a fine illustrated art book.( Maeght Éditeur, 1977: 150 ex. with 16 colored litho's, 50 ex. with three added litho's.)
