= Henri Collet =

French composer and music critic (1885–1951)

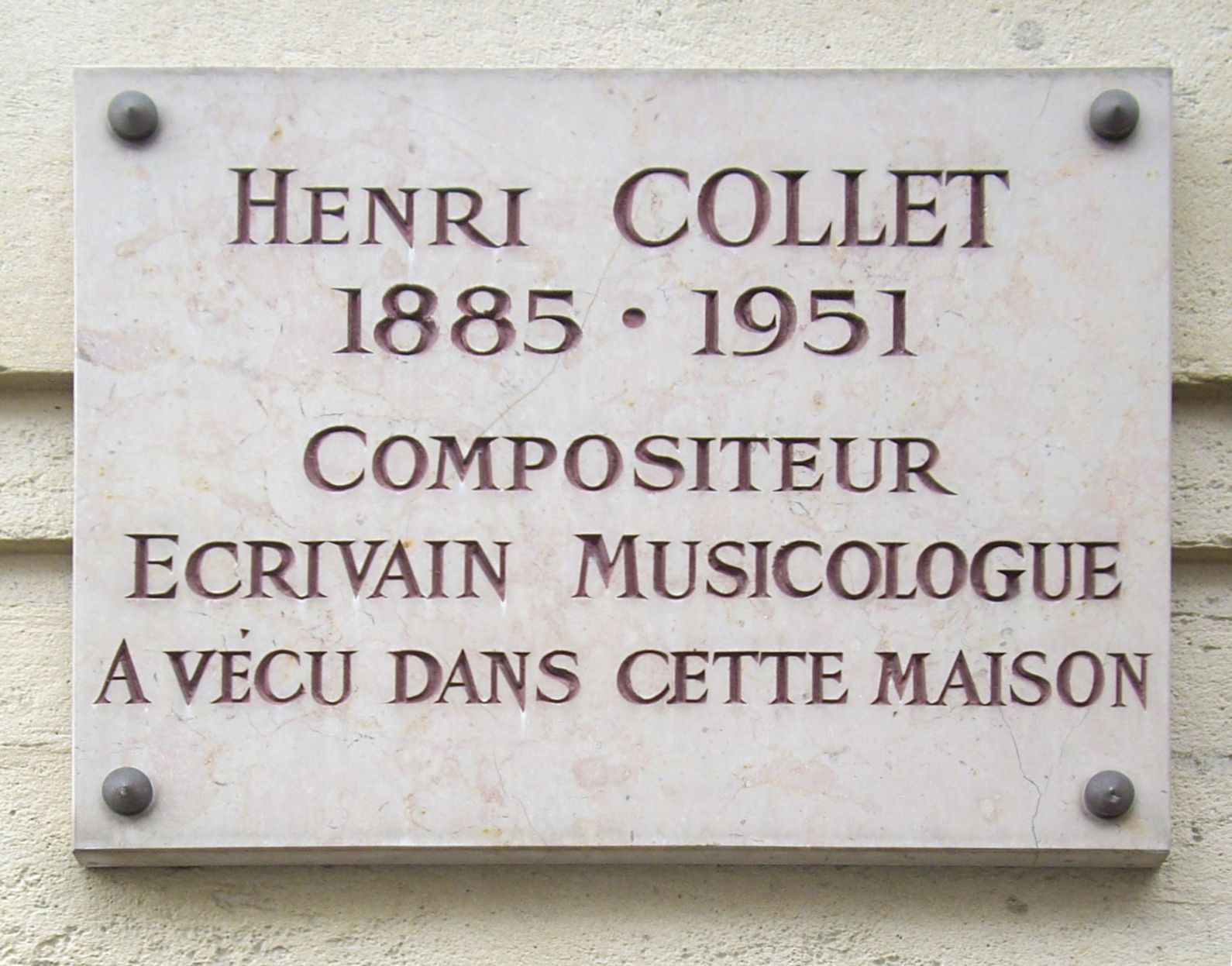
Plaque affixed to No.104, Paris 16th, where the composer Henri Collet (1885-1951) lived.

Henri Collet (French: [kɔlɛ]; 5 November 1885 – 23 November 1951) was a French composer and music critic who lived in Paris.

== Biography ==
Born in Paris, Collet first studied at the Conservatory of Music at Bordeaux before going to Madrid to study Spanish literature with Ramón Menéndez Pidal and composition with Felipe Pedrell and Federico Olmeda. Later, teachers in Paris included Déodat de Séverac, Gabriel Fauré and Manuel de Falla. In 1907, he gave his first public recitals as a pianist in Burgos and Madrid. In 1913, he earned his doctorate at the university of Bordeaux with a study about musical mysticism in sixteenth-century Spain.

Besides composing and writing, Collet taught at the Institut d'études hispaniques and later at the Collège Chaptal. He received a number of awards including a silver medal from the Faculté de lettres of the university of Bordeaux (1908), the Prix Pierre Aubry (1913), and the composition prize of the city of Paris for his stage work La Chèvre d'or (1936).

== Works ==
His music is marked by his admiration for Spanish culture – a result of his studies and travels over many years on Spain. In France, he contributed to the reputation of Spanish composers including Albéniz, Granados, Mompou, Nin and Turina. Today his music is seldom performed.

Collet is best remembered for his two 1920 articles in Comoedia in which he coined the term Les Six to designate a group of young composers at the Conservatoire de Paris.

== Selected works ==
Stage

- Le Cabaret espagnol, ballet (1918)
- Godefroy, "bouffonnerie musicale" in 1 act, Op. 81
- Clavelitos (Danses gitanes), ballet, Op. 87 (1928)
- Cervantes à Alger, opera (1930)
- Los toreros, ballet-pantomime in 1 act, 7 scenes (1932)
- La Chèvre d'or, lyrical comedy (opera) (1936)
- El alcalde de Zalamea, opera (1946)

Orchestral/Solo with Orchestra

- Burgos, "poème" for violin and orchestra, Op. 30 (1912)
- Rapsodie Castillane for viola and orchestra (1923)
- Symphonie de l'Alhambra (1947)
- Concerto flamenco No. 1 for piano and orchestra (1946)
- Concerto flamenco No. 2 for violin and orchestra (1947)

Chamber

- Musique espagnole for violin and piano
- Primavera, berceuse for violin and piano (1921)
- Sonate Castillane for violin and piano (1921)
- Trio Castillan for violin, cello and piano (1925)
- Castellanas, "suite espaganole" for string quartet and piano, Op. 32
- Briviesca, poem for guitar, Op. 67

Piano

- El escorial, Poème symphonique, Op. 22
- Chants de Castille, Series I (1920)
- Chants de Castille, Series II, Op. 42 (1922)
- Danzas castellanas, Op.75 (1925)
- Alma española, Dance Music from Spain, Opp. 111–185

Vocal

- Cinq poèmes de Francis Jammes, Opp. 17–21 (1920)
- Quatre paysages for voice and piano, Opp. 56–59
- Siete canciones populares de Burgos, Op. 80

== See also ==
- Les Six

== Bibliography ==
- Chr. Le Bordays: "Henri Collet (1883–1951): Le Compositeur", in: Revue internationale de musique française, 26 June 1988, p. 99–110.
- Jacinthe Harbec, Nicole Paiement: Catalogue des oeuvres de Henri Collet (Montréal: Éditions St-Martin, 1998). ISBN 2-89035-312-5.
