= Peintres voyageurs =

The term "peintres voyageurs" is a recent term (1993) given by some art historians to the large and diverse group of itinerant French artists - who in many cases spent more time travelling in the French colonies and the Far East than resident in France - from the end of the 19th century to the outbreak of World War II and the ensuing end of the colonial era.

The term "peintres voyageurs" derives in most cases from the use of the term by fr:Lynne Thornton, an English historian writing in French. Prior to Thornton's work the term is found, but without any concept of a "movement" of any artistic or social significance - or of the relation of these painters to the cultural policies of France in its colonies. Thornton estimates the number of these "travelling painters" as 2,000 between 1890 and 1940:

From the 1890s to 1940, some two thousand French painters travelled overseas, mainly in the French possessions from the West Indies and the Pacific islands to northern and central Africa and Indochina.

These painters were often associated with the Société des Peintres Orientalistes Français (founded 1893), though not all of them subscribed to Orientalism, and later with the activities of the Société Coloniale des Artistes Français (1908–1970). Some of these painters made their career competing for one bursary after another - starting with the conventional, and most desired, Prix de Rome, to the many secondary opportunities such as bursaries for the Casa de Velazquez in Madrid, Villa Abd-el-Tif in Algiers, and various colonial bursaries - the Prix de Guadeloupe, Prix de l'Indochine, which included a year teaching at EBAI in Hanoi, and many different bursaries for the numerous French colonies in Africa. With each bursary providing one or two years travel and residencies at various French colonial schools and institutions it was possible for these artists to travel the world painting. The two Sociétés, and other galleries, also provided plentiful opportunities for salons and exhibitions to display, and sell, the artists' works sent back to France.

Although some sources speak of a "school" of "peintres voyageurs" these painters and sculptors were only united by the inevitable "exotic" subject matter of their destinations - North Africa, Indochina, the Antilles - not by any particular artistic ethos, so cannot be called a "school" in the normal sense, even if those who won the prizes and bursaries tended to not be avant garde, and some were deeply conservative. Thornton notes "While most of these Orientalists adopted a more modern manner of painting, some - notably Ludwig Deutsch, Rudolf Ernst and Etienne Dinet - continued in the academic tradition throughout the 1920s." It is an open question to what extent the itinerant French painters and photographers of the early 20th Century were truly in sympathy with the local cultures, as argued by Lynne Thornton in particular, or simply fascinated by exotic scenes and colours as earlier Orientalism.
