= Orliénas =

- Commune
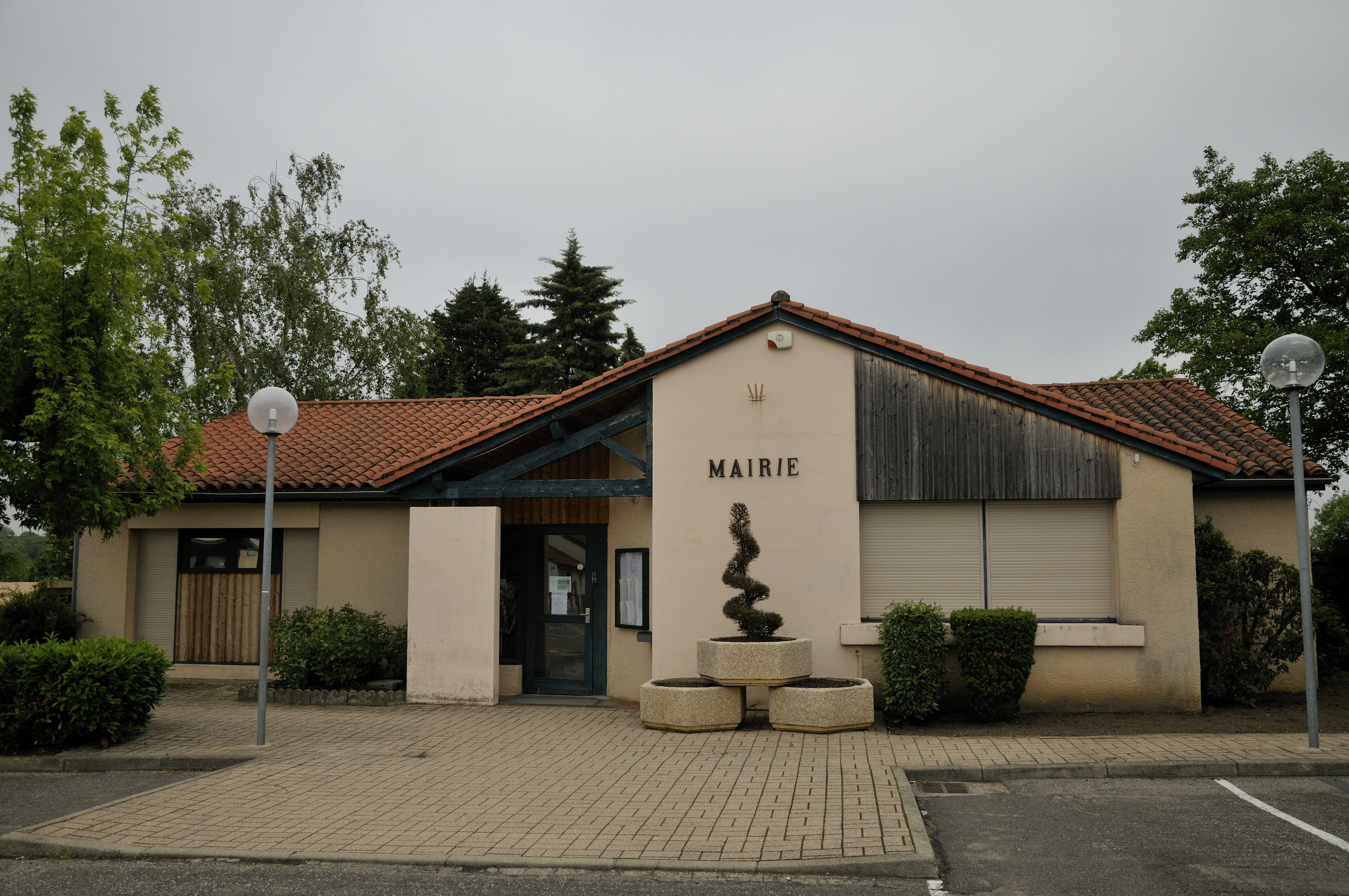
- The town hall in Orliénas

- Coat of arms
- Location of Orliénas
- Location within France Location within Auvergne-Rhône-Alpes
- Coordinates: 45°39′35″N 4°43′09″E
- Country: France
- Region: Auvergne-Rhône-Alpes
- Department: Rhône
- Arrondissement: Lyon
- Canton: Saint-Symphorien-d'Ozon
- Intercommunality: CC Pays Mornantais

Government
  - Mayor (2020–2026): Olivier Biaggi
- Area^{1}: 10.42 km^{2} (4.02 sq mi)
- Elevation: 305 m (1,001 ft)
- Highest elevation: 384 m (1,260 ft)
- Lowest elevation: 206 m (676 ft)
- Population (2023): 2,675
  - Density: 256.7/km^{2} (664.9/sq mi)
- Time zone: UTC+01:00 (CET)
  - Summer (DST): UTC+02:00 (CEST)
- INSEE/Postal code: 69148 /69530
- ^{1} French Land Register data, which excludes lakes, ponds, glaciers > 1 km^{2} (0.386 sq mi or 247 acres) and river estuaries.

Orliénas (French pronunciation: [ɔʁljena]) is a commune in the Rhône department in eastern France.

== Population ==
Historical population
Year	Pop.	±% p.a.
1968	984	—
1975	1,184	+2.68%
1982	1,482	+3.26%
1990	1,617	+1.10%
1999	1,976	+2.25%
2007	2,182	+1.25%
2012	2,310	+1.15%
2017	2,444	+1.13%
2023	2,675	+1.52%
Source: INSEE

== See also ==
- Communes of the Rhône department
