= List of compositions by Gabriel Fauré =

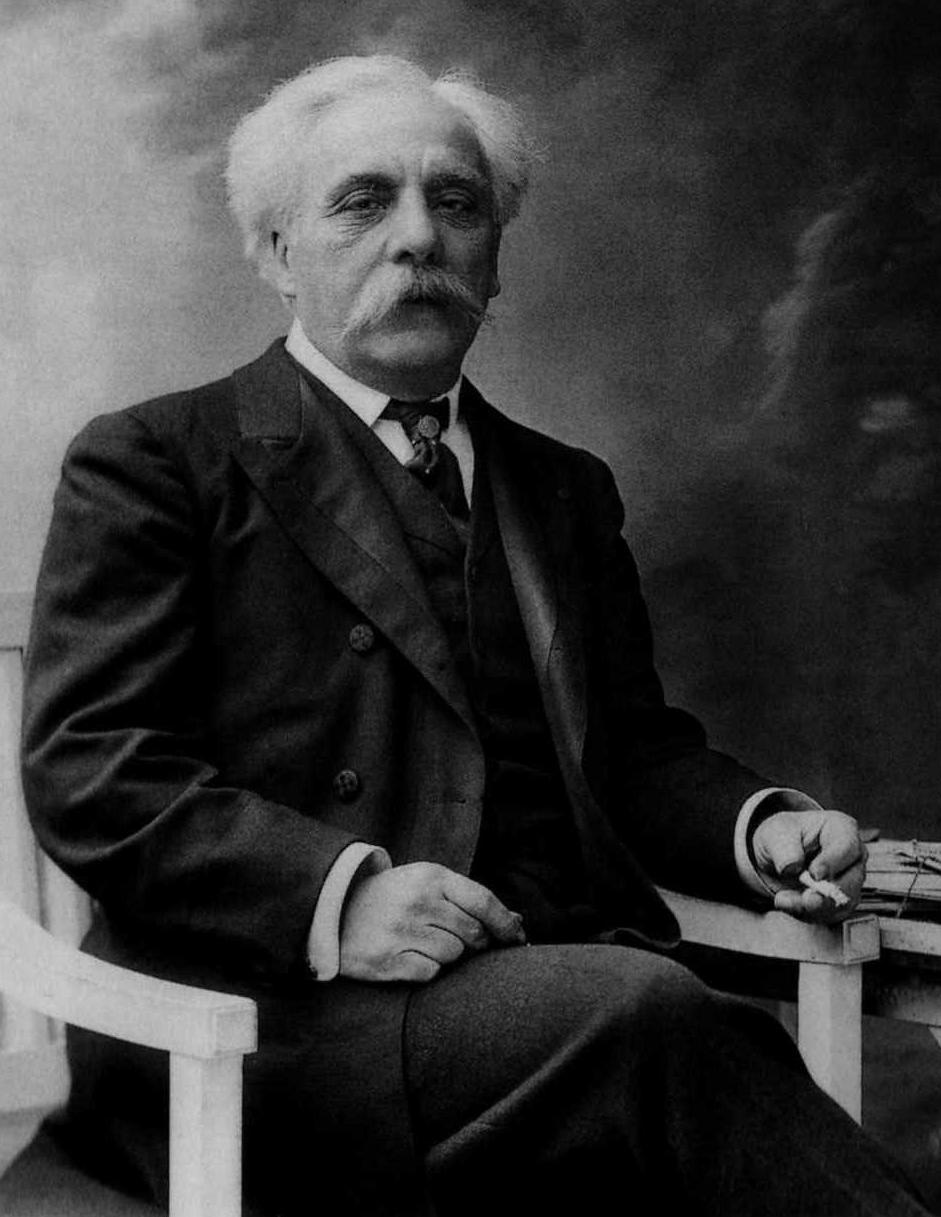
Gabriel Fauré by Paul Nadar in 1905.

The following is a complete list of the compositions by Gabriel Fauré. Works are listed both by genre and by opus number.

== By genre ==
=== Piano ===
==== Solo Piano ====
- Fugue à trois parties in F major (c1862)
- Sonata in F major (1863)
- Trois romances sans paroles, Op. 17 (?1863)
- Mazurka in B♭ (c1865)
- Gavotte in C♯ minor (1869)
- Huit pièces brèves, Op. 84 (1869-1902)
- Mazurka in B♭ major, Op. 32 (c1875)
- Nocturne no.1 in E♭ minor, Op. 33/1 (c1875)
- Ballade in F♯ major, Op. 19 (1877-9)
- Impromptu no.1 in E♭ major, Op. 25 (1881)
- Barcarolle no.1 in A minor, Op. 26 (?1881)
- Nocturne no.2 in B major, Op. 33/2 (c1881)
- Valse-caprice no.1 in A major, Op. 30 (1882)
- Impromptu no.2 in F minor, Op. 31 (1883)
- Nocturne no.3 in A♭ major, Op. 33/3 (1883)
- Impromptu no.3 in A♭ major, Op. 34 (1883)
- Valse-caprice no.2 in D♭ major, Op. 38 (1884)
- Nocturne no.4 in E♭ major, Op. 36 (1884)
- Nocturne no.5 in B♭ major, Op. 37 (1884)
- Barcarolle no.2 in G major, Op. 41 (1885)
- Barcarolle no.3 in G♭ major, Op. 42 (1885)
- Barcarolle no.4 in A♭ major, Op. 44 (1886)
- Valse-caprice no.3 in G♭ major, Op. 59 (1887-93)
- Valse-caprice no.4 in A♭ major, Op. 62 (1893-4)
- Nocturne no.6 in D♭ major, Op. 63 (1894)
- Barcarolle no.5 in F♯ minor, Op. 66 (1894)
- Theme and variations in C♯ minor, Op. 73 (1895)
- Barcarolle no.6 in E♭ major, Op. 70 (?1895)
- Prelude in C major (1897)
- Nocturne no.7 in C♯ minor, Op. 74 (1898)
- Nocturne no.8 in D♭ major, Op. 84/8 (1902)
- Barcarolle no.7 in D minor, Op. 90 (1905)
- Impromptu no.4 in D♭ major, Op. 91 (1905-6)
- Barcarolle no.8 in D♭ major, Op. 96 (1906)
- Nocturne no.9 in B minor, Op. 97 (?1908)
- Nocturne no.10 in E minor, Op. 99 (1908)
- Barcarolle no.9 in A minor, Op. 101 (1908-9)
- Impromptu no.5 in F♯ minor, Op. 102 (1908-9)
- Nine Preludes, Op. 103 (1909-10)
- Nocturne no.11 in F♯ minor, Op. 104/1 (1913)
- Barcarolle no.10 in A minor, Op. 104/2 (1913)
- Barcarolle no.11 in G minor, Op. 105 (1913)
- Barcarolle no.12 in E♭ minor, Op. 106bis (1915)
- Nocturne no.12 in E minor, Op. 107 (1915)
- Barcarolle no.13 in C major, Op. 116 (1921)
- Nocturne no.13 in B minor, Op. 119 (1921)

==== Piano four hands ====
- Souvenirs de Bayreuth (1888)
- Allegro symphonique, Op. 68 (1895)
- Dolly, Op. 56 (1894-6)
- Les Joueuses De Flûte, de Pénélope, Premier air de danse; Deuxième air

=== Chamber music ===
==== Violin and piano ====
- Violin Sonata No. 1 in A major, Op. 13 (1875-6)
- Berceuse, Op. 16 (1879)
- Romance in B♭ major, Op. 28 (1883)
- Andante, Op. 75 (1898)
- Morceau de lecture (1903)
- Les Joueuses De Flûte, de Pénélope, Premier air de danse; Deuxième air de danse. Transcription for violin and piano. (1913)
- Violin Sonata No. 2 in E minor, Op. 108 (1916-7)

==== Cello and piano ====
- Élégie, Op. 24 (1880)
- Papillon, Op. 77 (1885)
- Romance, Op. 69 (1894)
- Sicilienne, Op. 78 (1898)
- Sérénade, Op. 98 (1908)
- Cello Sonata No. 1 in D minor, Op. 109 (1917)
- Cello Sonata No. 2 in G minor, Op. 117 (1921)

==== Flute and piano ====
- Fantaisie, Op. 79 (1898)
- Morceau de concours (1898)
- Les Joueuses De Flûte, de Pénélope, Premier air de danse. Transcription for flute and piano. (1913)

==== String ensemble and piano ====
- Piano Quartet No. 1 in C minor, Op. 15 (1876-9)
- Piano Quartet No. 2 in G minor, Op. 45 (1887)
- Piano Quintet No. 1 in D minor, Op. 89 (1887-95)
- Piano Quintet No. 2 in C minor, Op. 115 (1919-21)
- Piano Trio in D minor, Op. 120 (1922-3)

==== Strings ====
- Morceau de lecture for two cellos (1897)
- String Quartet in E minor, Op. 121 (1924)

==== Solo harp ====
- Impromptu, Op. 86 (1904)
- Morceau de lecture (1904)
- Une châtelaine en sa tour, Op. 110 (1918)

=== Voice and piano ===
Opus Number	Title	Text	Year Composed	Year Published
1/1	Le papillon et la fleur	Victor Hugo	1861	1869
1/2	Mai	Hugo	?1862	1871
—	L’aube naît	Hugo	?1862	lost
—	Puisque j’ai mis ma lèvre	Hugo	8 Dec 1862	
5/2	Rêve d’amour (S’il est un charmant gazon)	Hugo	5 May 1864	1875
—	Tristesse d’Olympio	Hugo	c1865	
2/1	Dans les ruines d’une abbaye	Hugo	c1866	1869
2/2	Les matelots	Théophile Gautier	c1870	1876
4/2	Lydia	C.M.R. Leconte de Lisle	c1870	1871
—	L’aurore	Hugo	c1870	1958
7/2	Hymne	Charles Baudelaire	?1870	1871
3/1	Seule!	Gautier	1871	1871
5/3	L’absent (Sentiers où l’herbe se balance)	Hugo	3 April 1871	1879
8/2	La rançon	Baudelaire	?1871	1879
5/1	Chant d’automne	Baudelaire	c1871	1879
4/1	La chanson du pêcheur (Lamento)	Gautier	?1872	1877
6/1	Aubade	L. Pomey	c1873	1879
6/2	Tristesse	Gautier	c1873	1876
10/1	Puisqu'ici-bas toute âme (Duet)	Hugo	c1863-73	
10/2	Tarantelle (Duet)	Marc Monnier	c1873	1879
7/3	Barcarolle	Monnier	19 Oct 1873	1877
8/3	Ici-bas!	Sully Prudhomme	?1874	1877
8/1	Au bord de l’eau	Prudhomme	Aug 1875	1877
7/1	Après un rêve (Levati sol que la luna è levata)	anon., trans. Bussine	1877	1878
3/2	Sérénade toscane (O tu che dormie riposata stai)	anon., trans. R. Bussine	?1878	1879
6/3	Sylvie	Paul de Choudens	1878	1879
18/1	Nell	Leconte de Lisle	1878	1880
18/2	Le voyageur	Armand Silvestre	?1878	1880
18/3	Automne	Silvestre	1878	1880
21	Poème d’un jour: 1. Rencontre; 2. Toujours!; 3. Adieu	Charles Grandmougin	1878	1880
23/1	Les berceaux	Prudhomme	1879	1881
23/2	Notre amour	Silvestre	c1879	1882
23/3	Le secret	Silvestre	6 Jul 1881	1881
27/1	Chanson d’amour	Silvestre	1882	1882
27/2	La fée aux chansons	Silvestre	16 Sept 1882	1883
39/1	Aurore	Silvestre	20 May 1884	1885
39/2	Fleur jetée	Silvestre	25 May 1884	1885
39/3	Le pays des rêves	Silvestre	30 May 1884	1885
39/4	Les roses d’Ispahan	Leconte de Lisle	1884	1885
43/1	Noël	V Wilder	1885	1886 with piano and hmn, ad lib
43/2	Nocturne	Villiers de l’Isle Adam	1886	1886
46/1	Les présents	Villiers de l’Isle Adam	1887	1888
46/2	Clair de lune	Paul Verlaine	1887	1888
51/1	Larmes	Jean Richepin	1888	1888
51/2	Au cimetière	Richepin	1888	1888
51/3	Spleen	Verlaine	1888	1888
51/4	La rose	Leconte de Lisle	Aug 1890	1890
—	En prière	S. Bordèse	1890	1890
58	Cinq mélodies "de Venise": 1. Mandoline; 2. En sourdine 3. Green; 4. À Clymène; 5. C’est l’extase	Verlaine	1891	1891
posth.	Sérénade du Bourgeois gentilhomme	Molière	27 Feb 1893	1957
61	La Bonne Chanson: 1. Une sainte en son auréole 2. Puisque l’aube grandit 3. La lune blanche luit dans les bois 4. J’allais par des chemins perfides 5. J’ai presque peur, en vérité 6. Avant que tu ne t’en ailles 7. Donc, ce sera par un clair jour d’été 8. N’est-ce pas?; 9. L’hiver a cessé	Verlaine	Sept 1892–Feb 1894	1894
83/1	Prison	Verlaine	4 Dec 1894	1896
83/2	Soir	Albert Samain	17 Dec 1894	London and Paris, 1896
72	Pleurs d'or (Duet)	Samain	21 April 1896	
76/1	Le parfum impérissable	Leconte de Lisle	22 Aug 1897	London and Paris, 1897
76/2	Arpège	Samain	6 Sept 1897	London and Paris, 1897
85/1	Dans la forêt de septembre	C. Mendès	29 Sept 1902	1902
85/2	La fleur qui va sur l’eau	Mendès	13 Sept 1902	1902
85/3	Accompagnement	Samain	28 March 1902	1903
87/1	Le Plus doux chemin (Madrigal)	Silvestre	1904	1907
87/2	Le ramier (Madrigal)	Silvestre	1904	Milan, 1904
92	Le don silencieux	Jean Dominique	20 Aug 1906	1906
94	Chanson	Henri de Régnier	1906	1907
—	Vocalise-Etude	no text	1906	1907
95	La chanson d'Ève: 1. Paradis; 2. Prima verba 3. Roses ardentes 4. Comme Dieu rayonne 5. L’aube blanche 6. Eau vivante 7. Veilles-tu, ma senteur de soleil?; 8. Dans un parfum de roses blanches 9. Crépuscule; 10. O mort, poussière d’étoiles)	Charles van Lerberghe	1906–10	no.9 (1906), nos.1, 2 (1907), nos.3, 5 (1908), nos.6, 8 (1909), no.10 (1910)
106	Le jardin clos: 1. Exaucement; 2. Quand tu plonges tes yeux dans mes yeux 3. La messagère 4. Je me poserai sur ton coeur 5. Dans la nymphée 6. Dans la pénombre 7. Il m’est cher, amour, le bandeau 8. Inscription sur le sable)	van Lerberghe	July–Nov 1914	1915
113	Mirages: 1. Cygne sur l’eau 2. Reflets dans l’eau 3. Jardin nocturne 4. Danseuse	Renée de Brimont	1919	1919
114	C’est la paix	G. Debladis	8 Dec 1919	1920
118	L'horizon chimérique: 1. La mer est infinie 2. Je me suis embarqué 3. Diane, Séléné; 4. Vaisseaux, nous vous aurons aimés	Jean de La Ville de Mirmont	1921	1922

=== Choral ===
==== Religious ====
- Super flumina Babylonis (1863)
- Cantique de Jean Racine, Op. 11 (1865)
- Cantique à St Vincent de Paul, lost (1868)
- Ave Maria, Op. posth (1871)
- Cantique pour la Fête d’un supérieur, lost (c1872)
- Tu es Petrus (c. 1872)
- Benedictus (c. 1880) (first edition 1999)
- Messe basse (1882, rev. 1906)
- O salutaris, Op. 47/1 (1888)
- Maria Mater gratiae, Op. 47/2 (1888)
- Requiem, Op. 48 (1877, 1887–93)
- Ecce fidelis servus, Op. 54 (1889)
- Tantum ergo in A major, Op. 55 (?1890)
- Ave verum corpus, Op. 65/1 (1894)
- Tantum ergo in E major, Op. 65/2 (1894)
- Sancta mater (1894)
- Ave Maria in F major (?1894)
- Salve Regina, Op. 67/1 (1895)
- Ave Maria in A♭ major, Op. 67/2 (1895)
- Tantum ergo in F major (1904)
- Ave Maria in B minor, Op. 93 (1906)

In collaboration with André Messager:

- Messe des pêcheurs de Villerville

==== Secular ====
- Les djinns, Op. 12 (?1875)
- Le ruisseau, Op. 22 (?1881)
- La naissance de Vénus, Op. 29, libretto by Paul Collin (1882)
- Madrigal, Op. 35 (1883)
- Il est né le divin enfant (1888)
- Noël d’enfants (Les anges dans nos campagnes) (c1890)
- Hymne à Apollon, Op. 63bis (1894, rev. 1914)
- Pleurs d’or, Op. 72 (1896)

=== Orchestral ===
- Symphonic Suite, Op. 20 in F major (1865-74)
- Violin Concerto in D minor, Op. 14 (unfinished) (1878-9)
- Ballade for piano and orchestra in F♯ major, Op. 19 (arr. of original version for piano solo) (1881)
- Symphony in D minor, Op. 40 (destroyed, material re-used in Op. 108 and Op. 109) (1884)
- Pavane, Op. 50 (1887)
- Caligula, Op. 52 (1888)
- Shylock, Op. 57 (1890)
- Pelléas et Mélisande, Op. 80 (1900)
- Le voile du bonheur, Op. 88
- Fantaisie for piano and orchestra, Op. 111 (1918)
- Masques et bergamasques, Op. 112 (1919)

=== Operas ===
- Prométhée, Op. 82 (Opera in three acts: Tragédie lyrique, fp. 1900)
- Pénélope (Opera in three acts: Poème lyrique, fp. 1913)

== By opus number ==
- Op. 1 Two Songs
  - Le papillon et la fleur
  - Mai
- Op. 2 Two Songs
  - Dans le ruines d'une abbaye
  - Les matelots
- Op. 3 Two Songs
  - Seule
  - Sérénade toscane
- Op. 4 Two Songs
  - Chanson du pêcheur (lamento)
  - Lydia
- Op. 5 Three Songs
  - Chant d'automne
  - Rêve d'amour
  - L'absent
- Op. 6 Three Songs
  - Aubade
  - Tristesse
  - Sylvie
- Op. 7 Three Songs (1870-8)
  - Après un rêve
  - Hymne
  - Barcarolle
- Op. 8 Three Songs
  - Au bord de l'eau
  - La rançon
  - Ici-bas
- Op. 9 Number was not allocated to a composition.
- Op. 10 Two Duets
  - Puisqu'ici-bas
  - Tarantelle
- Op. 11 Cantique de Jean Racine (1865)
- Op. 12 Les djinns (1875?), for mixed chorus and piano or orchestra, after Hugo
- Op. 13 Violin Sonata No. 1 in A major (1875-6)
- Op. 14 Violin Concerto (1878-9), unfinished
- Op. 15 Piano Quartet No. 1 in C minor (1876-9)
- Op. 16 Berceuse for piano and violin (1878-9), also for violin/cello and orchestra
- Op. 17 Romances sans paroles (1863)
  1. Andante quasi allegretto
  2. Allegro molto
  3. Andante moderato
- Op. 18 Three Songs (1878)
  - Nell
  - Le voyageur
  - Automne
- Op. 19 Ballade (1881), originally for piano solo, orchestral accompaniment later added
- Op. 20 Symphonic Suite in F (1865–74)
- Op. 21 Poème d'un jour, song cycle
  - Rencontre
  - Toujours
  - Adieu
- Op. 22 Le ruisseau, (1881?) for 2-part female chorus and piano
- Op. 23 Three Songs (1879)
  - Les berceaux
  - Notre amour
  - Le secret
- Op. 24 Élégie for cello and piano (1883), orchestrated 1890
- Op. 25 Impromptu No. 1 in E♭ (1881)
- Op. 26 Barcarolle No. 1 in A minor (1881)
- Op. 27 2 Mélodies (1882)
  - Chanson d'amour
  - La fée aux chansons
- Op. 28 Romance for violin and piano (1877)
- Op. 29 La naissance de Vénus (1882)
- Op. 30 Valse-Caprice No. 1 in A (1882)
- Op. 31 Impromptu No. 2 in F minor (1883)
- Op. 32 Mazurka in B♭ (1875)
- Op. 33 Three Nocturnes
  - No. 1 in E♭ minor (1875)
  - No. 2 in B (1881)
  - No. 3 in A♭ (1883)
- Op. 34 Impromptu No. 3 in A♭ (1883)
- Op. 35 Madrigal
- Op. 36 Nocturne No. 4 in E♭ (1884)
- Op. 37 Nocturne No. 5 in B♭ (1884)
- Op. 38 Valse-Caprice No. 2 in D♭ (1884)
- Op. 39 Four Songs (1884)
  - Aurore
  - Fleur jetée
  - Le pays des rêves
  - Les roses d'Ispahan
- Op. 40 Symphony in D minor (1884)
- Op. 41 Barcarolle No. 2 in G (1885)
- Op. 42 Barcarolle No. 3 in G♭ (1885)
- Op. 43 Two Songs (1885-6)
  - Noël
  - Nocturne
- Op. 44 Barcarolle No. 4 in A♭ (1886)
- Op. 45 Piano Quartet No. 2 in G minor (1885-6)
- Op. 46 Two Songs (1887)
  - Les présents
  - Clair de lune
- Op. 47 No. 1 O Salutaris (1887)
- Op. 47 No. 2 Maria, Mater Gratiae (1887)
- Op. 48 Requiem in D minor (1877, rev. 1887–90, orch. 1899)
- Op. 49 Petite Pièce in G for cello and piano (c. 1888) now lost
- Op. 50 Pavane in F♯ minor (1887)
- Op. 51 Four Songs (1888)
  - Larmes
  - Au cimetière
  - Spleen
  - La rose
- Op. 52 Caligula (1888)
- Op. 53 Number was not allocated to a composition.
- Op. 54 Ecce fidelis servus (1890), motet
- Op. 55 Tantum ergo (1890)
- Op. 56 Dolly Suite for piano four hands (1894-7), orch. Rabaud 1906
  - Berceuse (1894)
  - Mi-a-ou (1896)
  - Le jardin de Dolly (1896)
  - Kitty-valse (1896)
  - Tendresse (1896)
  - Le pas espagnol (1897)
- Op. 57 Shylock Suite (1889)
- Op. 58 Cinq mélodies "de Venise" (1891), song cycle after Verlaine
  - Mandoline
  - En sourdine
  - Green
  - À Clymène
  - C'est l'extase
- Op. 59 Valse-Caprice No. 3 in G♭ (1887–93)
- Op. 60 Number was not allocated to a composition. However, "Opus 60" was used to refer to an early version of the piano quintet Op. 89.
- Op. 61 La Bonne Chanson (1892–4), song cycle after Verlaine
  - Une sainte en son auréole
  - Puisque l'aube grandit
  - La lune blanche luit dans les bois
  - J'allais par des chemins perfides
  - J'ai presque peur, en vérité
  - Avant que tu ne t'en ailles
  - Donc, ce sera par un clair jour d'été
  - N'est-ce pas?
  - L'hiver a cessé
- Op. 62 Valse-Caprice No. 4 in A♭ (1893-4)
- Op. 63 Nocturne No. 6 in D♭ (1894)
- Op. 63bis Hymne à Apollon (1894)
- Op. 64 Number was not allocated to a composition.
- Op. 65 No. 1 Ave verum corpus (1894)
- Op. 65 No. 2 Tantum ergo (1894)
- Op. 66 Barcarolle No. 5 in F♯ minor (1894)
- Op. 67 No. 1 Salve Regina (1894-5)
- Op. 67 No. 2 Ave Maria (1894-5)
- Op. 68 Allegro symphonique (1895), arr. for piano 4 hands from 1st movement of Symphonic Suite, Op. 20
- Op. 69 Romance in A for cello and piano (1894)
- Op. 70 Barcarolle No. 6 in E♭ (1895)
- Op. 72 Pleurs d’or
- Op. 73 Theme and Variations for piano (1895), orch. Inghelbrecht 1955
  - Theme
  - Variation I. L'istesso tempo
  - Variation II. Piu mosso
  - Variation III. Un poco piu mosso
  - Variation IV. L'istesso tempo
  - Variation V. Un poco piu mosso
  - Variation VI. Molto adagio
  - Variation VII. Allegro moderato
  - Variation VIII. Andante molto moderato
  - Variation IX. Quasi adagio
  - Variation X. Allegro vivo
  - Variation XI. Andante molto, moderato espressivo
- Op. 74 Nocturne No. 7 in C♯ minor (1898)
- Op. 75 Andante for violin and piano (1897)
- Op. 76 Two Songs (1897)
  - Le parfum impérissable
  - Arpège
- Op. 77 Papillon for cello and piano (1884), also for string quintet or violin and piano
- Op. 78 Sicilienne for cello and piano, (1898)
- Op. 79 Fantaisie for flute and piano, (1898), orch. Aubuert (1957)
- Op. 80 Pelléas et Mélisande (1898)
- Op. 82 Prométhée (1900)
- Op. 83 Two Songs (1894)
  - Prison
  - Soir
- Op. 84 Huit pièces brèves (1869–1902)
  1. Capriccio in E♭ major
  2. Fantaisie in A♭ major
  3. Fugue in A minor
  4. Adagietto in E minor
  5. Improvisation in C♯ minor
  6. Fugue in E minor
  7. Allegresse in C major
  8. Nocturne No. 8 in D♭ major (1898–1902)
- Op. 85 Trois mélodies (1902)
  - Dans la forêt de septembre
  - La fleur qui va sur l'eau
  - Accompagnement
- Op. 86 Impromptu for harp (1904) (piano arrangement is Op.86 bis, 'Impromptu No. 6' in D♭)
- Op. 87 Two Songs (1904)
  - Le Plus doux chemin
  - Le ramier
- Op. 88 Le voile du bonheur (1901), after Clemenceau
- Op. 89 Piano Quintet No. 1 in D minor (1890-4, rev. 1903–5)
- Op. 90 Barcarolle No. 7 in D minor (1905)
- Op. 91 Impromptu No. 4 in D♭ (1905)
- Op. 92 Le don silencieux (1906)
- Op. 93 Ave Maria for two sopranos and organ (1906)
- Op. 94 Chanson (1906)
- Op. 95 La chanson d'Ève (1906–10), song cycle after van Lerberghe
  - Paradis
  - Prima verba
  - Roses ardentes
  - Comme Dieu rayonne
  - L'aube blanche
  - Eau vivante
  - Veilles-tu, ma senteur de soleil?
  - Dans un parfum de roses blanches
  - Crépuscule
  - O mort, poussière d'étoiles
- Op. 96 Barcarolle No. 8 in D♭ (1906)
- Op. 97 Nocturne No. 9 in B minor (1908)
- Op. 98 Sérénade for cello and piano (1908)
- Op. 99 Nocturne No. 10 in E minor (1908)
- Op. 100 Number was not allocated to a composition.
- Op. 101 Barcarolle No. 9 in A minor (1908-9)
- Op. 102 Impromptu No. 5 in F♯ minor (1909)
- Op. 103 Nine Préludes (1909–10)
  1. No. 1 in D♭ major
  2. No. 2 in C♯ minor
  3. No. 3 in G minor
  4. No. 4 in F major
  5. No. 5 in D minor
  6. No. 6 in E♭ minor
  7. No. 7 in A major
  8. No. 8 in C minor
  9. No. 9 in E minor
- Op. 104 No. 1 Nocturne No. 11 in F♯ minor (1913)
- Op. 104 No. 2 Barcarolle No. 10 in A minor (1913)
- Op. 105 Barcarolle No. 11 in G minor (1913-5)
- Op. 106 Le jardin clos (1914), song cycle after van Lerberghe
  - Exaucement
  - Quand tu plonges tes yeux dans mes yeux
  - La messagère
  - Je me poserai sur ton coeur
  - Dans la nymphée
  - Dans la pénombre
  - Il m'est cher, amour, le bandeau
  - Inscription sur le sable
- Op. 106bis Barcarolle No. 12 in E♭ (1913-5)
- Op. 107 Nocturne No. 12 in E minor (1915)
- Op. 108 Violin Sonata No. 2 in E minor (1916-7)
- Op. 109 Cello Sonata No. 1 in D minor (1917)
- Op. 110 Une châtelaine en sa tour (1918) for harp, arr. Durand for piano
- Op. 111 Fantaisie for piano and orchestra (1918)
- Op. 112 Masques et bergamasques (1919)
- Op. 113 Mirages (1919), song cycle after de Brimont
  - Cygne sur l'eau
  - Reflets dans l'eau
  - Jardin nocturne
  - Danseuse
- Op. 114 C'est la paix! (1919)
- Op. 115 Piano Quintet No. 2 in C minor (1919–21)
- Op. 116 Barcarolle No. 13 in C (1921)
- Op. 117 Cello Sonata No. 2 in G minor (1921)
- Op. 118 L'horizon chimérique (1921), song cycle after de La Ville de Mirmont
  - La mer est infinie
  - Je me suis embarqué
  - Diane, Séléné
  - Vaisseaux, nous vous aurons aimés
- Op. 119 Nocturne No. 13 in B minor (1921)
- Op. 120 Piano Trio in D minor (1922-3)
- Op. 121 String Quartet in E minor (1923-4)
