= Mexico City Philharmonic Orchestra =

Mexican orchestra

- Orchestra
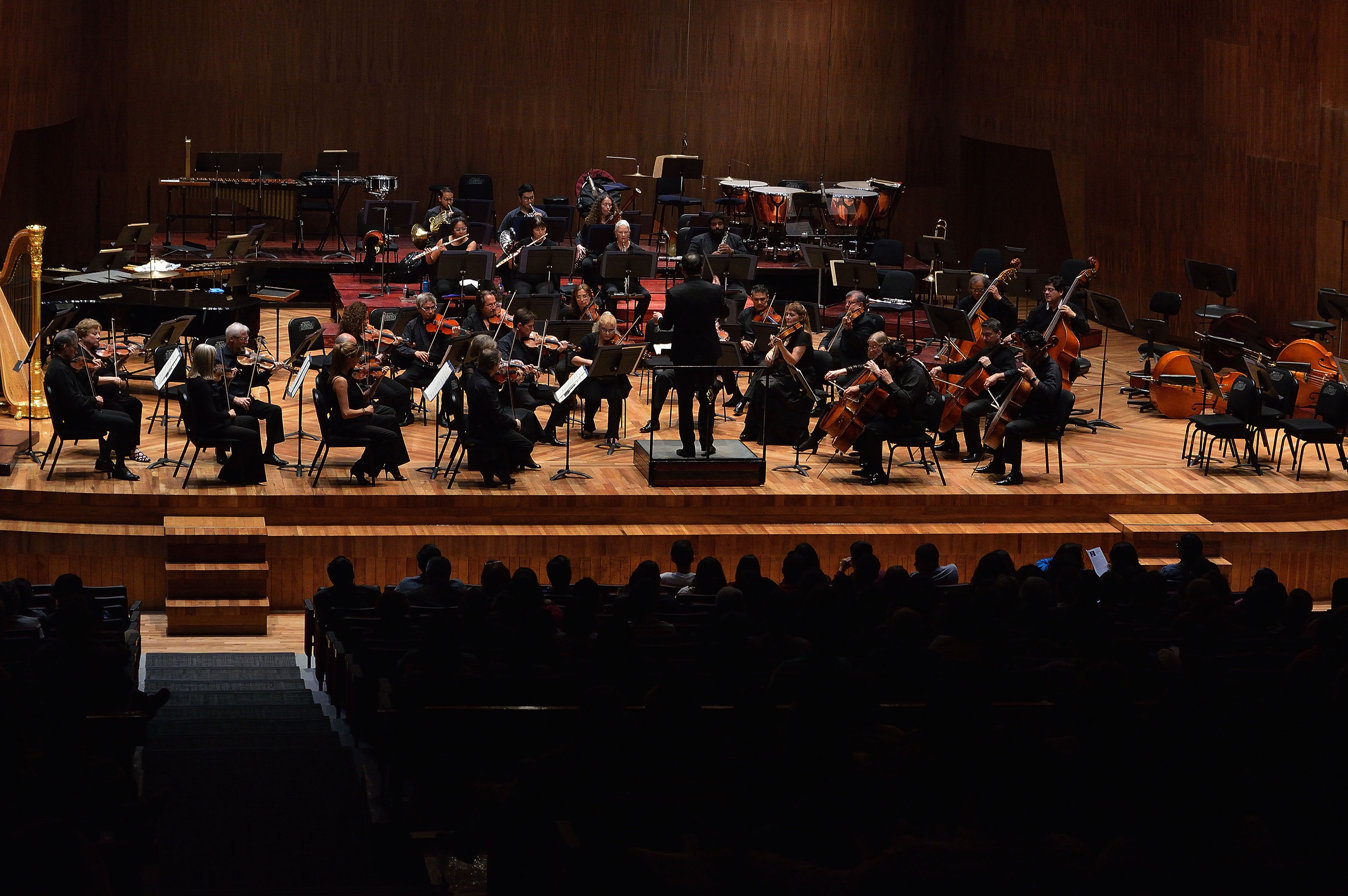
- La Orquesta Sinfónica de la Ciudad de México in the Silvestre Revueltas Hall of the Centro Cultural Ollin Yoliztli
- Native name: Orquesta Filarmónica de la Ciudad de México
- Founded: 1978
- Location: 5141 Periférico Sur, Tlalpan, Mexico City
- Concert hall: Silvestre Revueltas Hall, Ollín Yoliztli Cultural Center
- Principal conductor: Scott Yoo
- Website: ofcm.cultura.cdmx.gob.mx

The Mexico City Philharmonic Orchestra (Spanish: Orquesta Filarmónica de la Ciudad de México) is an orchestra of international rank founded and underwritten by the government of Mexico. The home venue is the Silvestre Revueltas Hall at the Ollín Yoliztli Cultural Center in Tlalpan, Mexico City, which opened in 1979.

== History ==
The Mexico City Philharmonic Orchestra was founded in 1978 by the National Government of Mexico through an initiative by Carmen Romano, wife of then President of Mexico José López Portillo. The Philharmonic was part of a plan to make fine arts education accessible to youths. The government launched classical music workshops and formed professional orchestras, including the Mexico City Philharmonic Orchestra. Fernando Lozano Rodríguez was the founding conductor. The Philharmonic's venue name, ollín yoliztli, means "life movement" or "life force" in Náhuatl.

== Directors, members, and notable soloists ==
Guest conductors have included Leonard Bernstein, Eduardo Mata, and Enrique Diemecke. Guest soloists have included Martha Argerich, Narciso Yepes, Nicanor Zabaleta, Renata Scotto, Birgit Nilsson, Claudio Arrau, János Starker, Isaac Stern, Plácido Domingo, and María Teresa Rodríguez. Artistic directors are appointed by the Secretary of Culture of Mexico City.

Artistic directors

- 1978–1982: Fernando Lozano Rodríguez
- 1983–1989: Enrique Bátiz, made 19 recordings with the Mexico City Philharmonic as conductor
- 1990–????: Luis Herrera de la Fuente
- 1998–2002: Jorge Mester
- Enrique Barrios
- 2013–2016: José Areán, appointed artistic director January 2013
- 2016–present: Scott Yoo, appointed artistic director and chief conductor, February 2016

Principal guest conductors

- 2011–2013: José Areán, appointed Principal Guest Director June 2011

Assistant conductors

- 1980–1983: Enrique Diemecke (born 1955)

Associate conductors

- 1998–2002: Carlos Miguel Prieto (born 1965)

Musicians

- 1978–1979: Jerome (Jerry) Ashby (1956–2007), french horn; became associate principal french horn with the New York Philharmonic in 1979
- Morris T. Kainuma (born 1959), tuba; appointed principal tuba in 1980; currently a freelance and educator in the New York City area
- John Emmanuel Godoy (1959) was appointed principal timpanist in 1987. During his tenure, the Mexico City Philharmonic performed four concerts with tenor Plácido Domingo, including recording Lalo Schifrin's world premiere of Cantos Aztecas. Godoy later won the principal timpani position with the Corpus Christi Symphony under John Giordano. In 2011 he founded the Lux Musicae chamber group and became its artistic director.

== Awards and critical acclaim ==
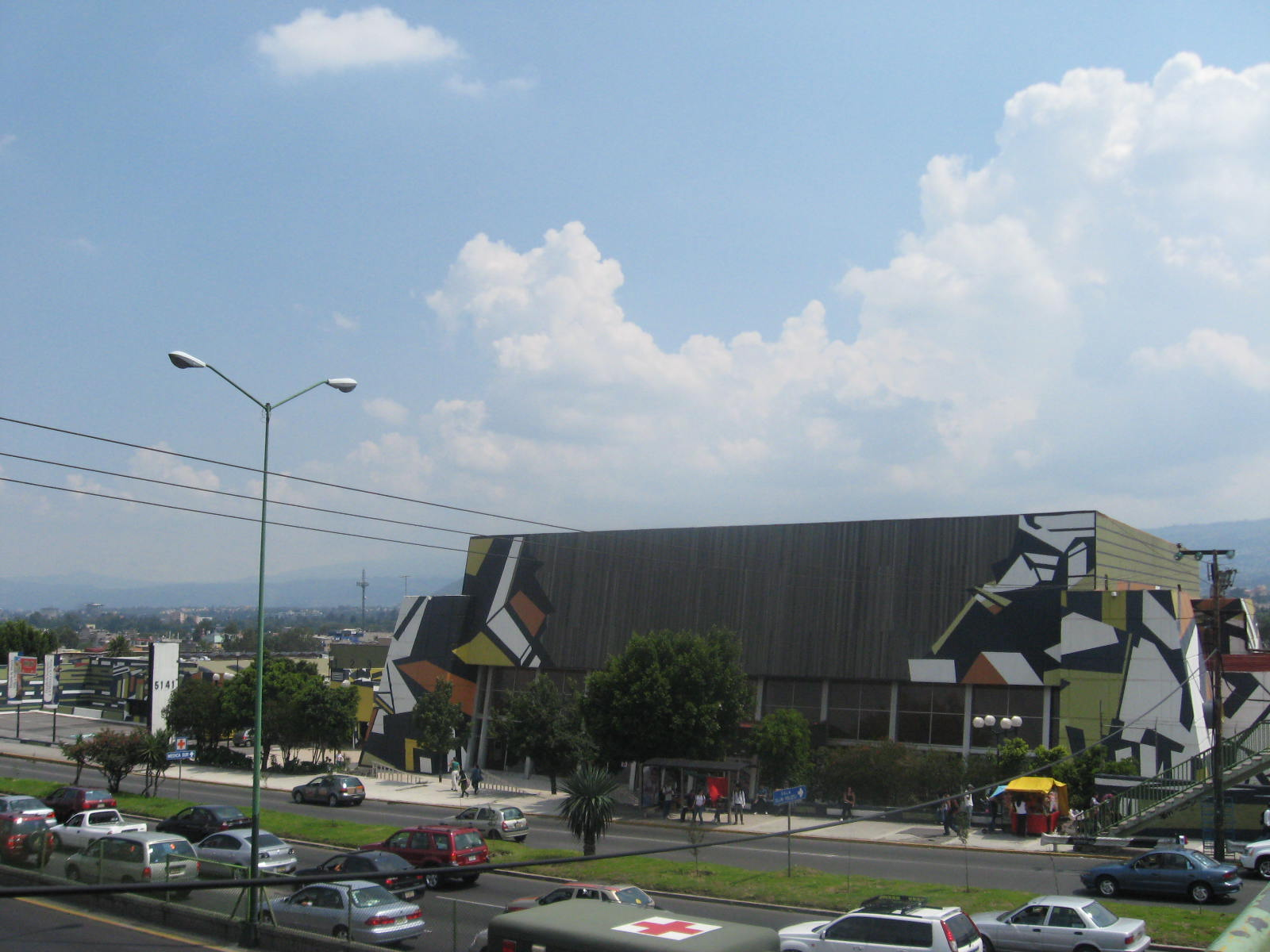
Ollín Yoliztli Cultural Center

The Mexico City Philharmonic Orchestra has made over 100 recordings, most of them of works by Mexican composers. The Philharmonic is reputed to be the most prolifically recorded orchestra of music by Mexican composers. In 1981, it won the Academie du Disque Francais Grand Prize for its recording of Mexican Ballets by Blas Galindo, José Pablo Moncayo, and Carlos Chávez. Fernando Lozano Rodríguez was the conductor. The jury stated that the Philharmonic was the best in Latin America.

== Selected discography ==
- Works of De Falla, Desto DC 7216 (1982); OCLC 24746534 – Fernando Lozano Rodríguez, conductor
- Classical Music of Mexico, Desto DC 7218 (1982); OCLC 16351742 – Fernando Lozano Rodríguez, conductor
- Music of Revueltas, Desto DC 7215 (1982); OCLC 16351737 – Fernando Lozano Rodríguez, conductor
- Gabriel Fauré, Musical Heritage Society (1991); OCLC 23294557 – Recorded in 1989 at the Nezahualcóyotl Concert Hall, Mexico City; Rodolfo Bonucci, violin (grandson of the Italian cellist, Arturo Bonucci (1894–1964); Viocheslav Ponomarev (1950–2009), cello; Enrique Bátiz, conductor
1. Concerto for Violin and Orchestra (world premiere recording)
2. Berceuse, for violin and orchestra, Op. 16
3. Elegie, for cello and orchestra, Op. 24
4. Overture, from Masques et bergamasques, Op. 112
5. Nocturne, from Shylock, Op. 57
6. Pelléas et Mélisande: Suite, Op. 80
- Salute to Democracy, EMI Classics CDC 7 54539 2 (1992); OCLC 30429188 – Enrique Bátiz, conductor
1. Fanfare for the Common Man
2. Lincoln Portrait
