= Cello Sonata No. 2 (Fauré) =

Second cello sonata by Gabriel Fauré

Fauré in 1922

The Cello Sonata No. 2 in G minor, Op. 117 is the second of the two cello sonatas by Gabriel Fauré.

In early 1921 Fauré had been commissioned by the French government to write a funeral march for a ceremony to be held on 5 May at Les Invalides to mark the 100th anniversary of the death of Napoleon. The sombre theme he composed for it remained in his mind and, as he said, "turned itself into a sonata". By then the composer was frail, and his ill health delayed the completion of the outer movements until late in the year. On 10 November Fauré wrote to his friend and benefactor Charles Martin Loeffler asking him to accept the dedication of the cello sonata, which he had completed that same day.

The work was premiered on 13 May 1922 at a concert of the Société Nationale de Musique, by the cellist Gérard Hekking and the pianist Alfred Cortot, who had been the performers at the premiere of Fauré's First Cello Sonata five years earlier.

== Structure ==
The sonata has three movements:

=== I. Allegro ===
The first movement, in G minor in 3/4 time, is in sonata form. It opens with a piano melody with syncopated accompaniment, immediately echoed by the cello. The critic Nicolas Southon comments that the movement "combines a simmering sensitivity with skilful canonic writing", which Fauré "seems to use just for the pleasure of it". After a secondary element, introduced by a descending seventh, the second subject is a piano cantando of themes and motifs that are used to form the development. In the recapitulation the first subject returns with the roles of the parts reversed: the cello takes the lead, with the piano closely shadowing it. The movement ends in G major.

=== II. Andante ===
The slow movement, in E♭ in 4/4 time, is a transcription of the Chant funéraire written to mark the centenary of Napoleon's death. The critic Roger Nichols comments, "In the measured repeated chords of the accompaniment and the long majestic cello lines it looks back to the successful Élégie, now coloured with more enigmatic harmonies". The Fauré scholar Jean-Michel Nectoux writes that although there is less pathos in this movement than in the Élégie, there is no less nobility. In his view, the second theme, in A♭ major, "gives a good idea of how far Fauré had come since 1880". He notes that the chorale-like theme, centred on the dominant E♭, has its intensity increased when the piano repeats it and makes a sudden modulation to the distant key of B minor. Nectoux finds that this strikes "a note of tragedy rare in the works of a composer who is more usually concerned to express tenderness, contentment or seductiveness". At the climax of the movement the two main themes are combined, and after a brief recapitulation the Andante ends calmly, in C major.

=== III. Finale: Allegro vivo ===
The concluding movement, in G minor in 2/4 time, serves the function of both scherzo and finale. It opens with an ascending theme for the piano, answered by the cello with a descending scale. The first main theme is a syncopated tune that Nichols calls "almost jazzy". The piano introduces a new chordal theme marked sans ralentir in simple four-part harmony. The expected return of the first theme becomes instead a contrasting section with the piano in divided octaves, and the cello in pizzicato chords and repeated notes. Nichols comments that the piano is "the leader of things harmonic, while the cello rides imperiously over all its eccentricities". The two main themes of the movement are further developed before the final coda, described by Nectoux as "a burst of the highest spirits".

The playing time of the sonata is about twenty minutes.

== Sources ==
- Nectoux, Jean-Michel (1991). Gabriel Fauré – A Musical Life. Roger Nichols (trans.). Cambridge: Cambridge University Press. ISBN 978-0-521-23524-2.
- Orledge, Robert (1979). Gabriel Fauré. London: Eulenburg Books. ISBN 978-0-903873-40-6.
