= Pavane (Fauré) =

1887 composition by Gabriel Fauré

Fauré in 1887

The Pavane in F♯ minor, Op. 50, is a short work by the French composer Gabriel Fauré written in 1887. It was originally a piano piece, but is better known in Fauré's version for orchestra and optional chorus. It was first performed in Paris in 1888, becoming one of the composer's most popular works.

== History ==
The work is titled after the slow processional Spanish court dance of the same name. Fauré's original version of the piece was written for piano and chorus in the late 1880s. He described it as "elegant, assuredly, but not particularly important."

Fauré composed the orchestral version at Le Vésinet in the summer of 1887. He envisaged a purely orchestral composition, using modest forces, to be played at a series of light summer concerts conducted by Jules Danbé. After Fauré opted to dedicate the work to his patron, Elisabeth, comtesse Greffulhe, he felt compelled to stage a grander affair and at her recommendation he added an invisible chorus to accompany the orchestra (with additional allowance for dancers). The words were inconsequential verses, à la Verlaine, on the romantic helplessness of man, written by the Countess's cousin, Robert de Montesquiou. Fauré wrote:

M. de Montesquiou ... has most kindly accepted the egregiously thankless and difficult task of setting to this music, which is already complete, words that will make our Pavane fit to be both danced and sung. He has given it a delightful text: sly coquetries by the female dancers, and great sighs by the male dancers that will singularly enhance the music. If the whole marvellous thing with a lovely dance in fine costumes and an invisible chorus and orchestra could be performed, what a treat it would be!

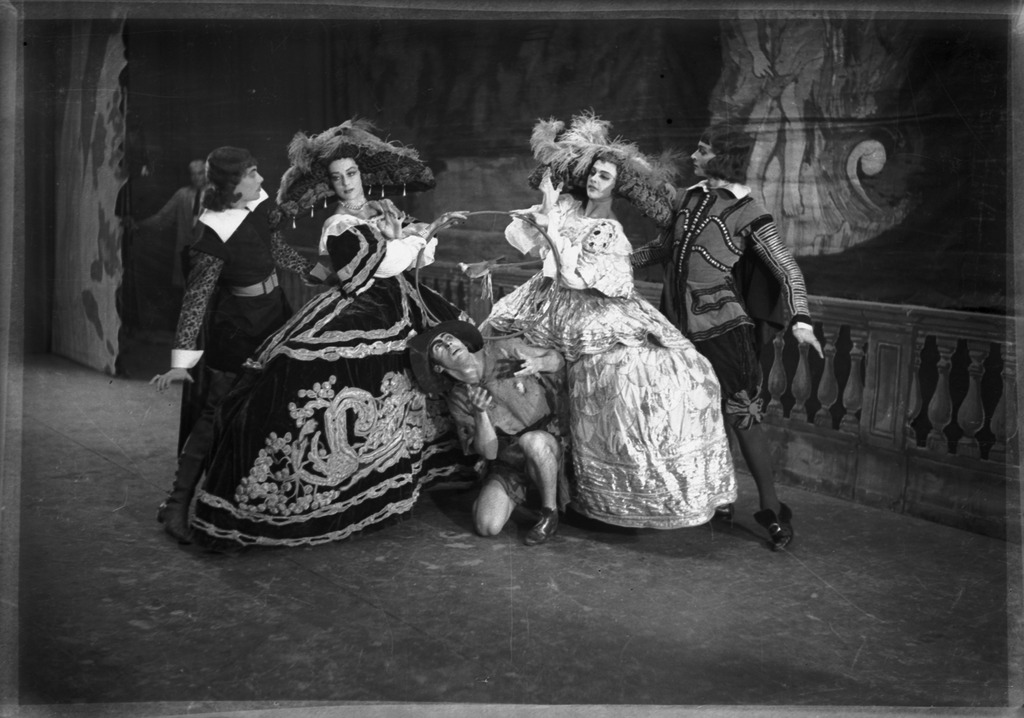
The Ballets Russes presentation of Las Meninas, danced to Fauré's Pavane

The orchestral version was first performed at a Concert Lamoureux under the baton of Charles Lamoureux on 25 November 1888. Three days later, the choral version was premiered at a concert of the Société nationale de musique. In 1891, the Countess finally helped Fauré produce the version with both dancers and chorus, in a "choreographic spectacle" designed to grace one of her garden parties in the Bois de Boulogne.

From the outset, the Pavane has enjoyed immense popularity, whether with or without chorus. With choreography by Léonide Massine a ballet version entered the repertoire of Sergei Diaghilev's Ballets Russes in 1917, alternatively billed as Las Meninas or Les Jardins d'Aranjuez, danced to music by not only Fauré but also Maurice Ravel and others. For Massine, Fauré's music had "haunting echoes of Spain's Golden Age" parallelling the formality and underlying sadness he found in the paintings of Velázquez. Some critics found the ballet pallid, but Diaghilev retained a fondness for the piece, and kept it in the company's repertoire until the end of his life.

Fauré's example was imitated by his juniors, who went on to write pavanes of their own: Debussy's Passepied in his Suite bergamasque and Ravel's Pavane pour une infante défunte, and "Pavane de la belle au bois dormant" in Ma mère l'oye.

== Music ==
Pavane (Fauré)-sample.ogg

Opening bars

The work is scored for modest orchestral forces consisting of strings and one pair each of flutes, oboes, clarinets, bassoons, and horns.

The Fauré scholar Jean-Michel Nectoux writes that the Pavane has become one of the composer's best-known pieces, and "there will be few to deny that it is one of the most attractive of his lesser works: the flute theme, once heard, is not easily forgotten". In a 1979 study, Robert Orledge describes the scoring of the Pavane as "delicate and airy, with some practical and inspired woodwind writing and a variety of string textures…" He adds that the strings sometimes double the viola part on either second violins or cellos, "perhaps for safety's sake". After the opening flute theme, there is a more dramatic central section, comprising a series of four-bar sequences over bass pedals which descend whole tones – a favourite device of Fauré's. There are small and barely perceptible changes to the main theme during the work and reharmonisations that Orledge calls "a miracle of Fauréan ingenuity".

Performance timings vary considerably. These recordings made between 1953 and 2014 have playing times from under five minutes to nearly seven:

Orchestra	Conductor	Year	Timing	Ref
Detroit Symphony	Paul Paray	1953	4:50	
ORTF National Orchestra	Sir Thomas Beecham	1959	5:09	
Philadelphia Orchestra	Eugene Ormandy	1968	6:58	
Orchestre de Paris	Daniel Barenboim	1974	6:18	
Academy of St Martin in the Fields	Neville Marriner	1981	6:35	
Boston Symphony	Seiji Ozawa	1986	6:51	
Montreal Symphony	Charles Dutoit	1987	6:39	
BBC Philharmonic	Yan Pascal Tortelier	1995	6:19	
San Francisco Symphony	Michael Tilson Thomas	2014	6:12	

Fauré intended the piece to be played more briskly than it is sometimes performed in its more familiar orchestral guise. The conductor Sir Adrian Boult heard Fauré play the piano version several times and noted that he took it at a tempo no slower than 100 crotchets a minute. Boult commented that the composer's sprightly tempo emphasised that the Pavane was not a piece of German romanticism, and that the text later added was "clearly a piece of light-hearted chaffing between the dancers".

== Verse ==
C'est Lindor, c'est Tircis et c'est tous nos vainqueurs!
C'est Myrtille, c'est Lydé! Les reines de nos coeurs!
Comme ils sont provocants! Comme ils sont fiers toujours!
Comme on ose régner sur nos sorts et nos jours!

Faites attention! Observez la mesure!
Ô la mortelle injure!
La cadence est moins lente!
Et la chute plus sûre!

Nous rabattrons bien leur caquets!
Nous serons bientôt leurs laquais!
Qu'ils sont laids! Chers minois!
Qu'ils sont fols! (Airs coquets!)

Et c'est toujours de même, et c'est ainsi toujours!
On s'adore! On se hait!
On maudit ses amours!
Adieu Myrtille, Eglé, Chloé, démons moqueurs!
Adieu donc et bons jours aux tyrans de nos coeurs! (Note: The distribution of the words between sopranos, contraltos, tenors and basses is: Sopranos: C'est Lindor, c'est Tircis et c'est tous nos vainqueurs/Basses: Cest Myrtil, c'est Lydé! les reines de nos cœurs/Contraltos: Comme ils sont provocants! Comme ils sont fiers toujours!/All four voices: Comme on ose régner sur nos sorts et nos jours/Sopranos: Faites attention!/Basses: Observez la mesure!/Sopranos: Ô la mortelle injure!/Tenors: La cadence est moins lente et la chute plus sûre./Contraltos: Nous rabattrons bien leur caquets/Basses: Nous serons bientôt leurs laquais!/Contraltos: Qu'ils sont laids!/Tenors: Chers minois!/Sopranos and contraltos: Qu'ils sont fols!/Basses: Airs coquets!/Tenors: Et c'est toujours de même,/Basses: Et c'est ainsi toujours!/Sopranos and contraltos: On s'adore, on se hait! On maudit ses amours!/Tenors and basses: On s'adore!/All four voices: On se hait/Sopranos: On maudit ses amours!/Tenors: Adieu Myrtil! Eglé, Chloé, démons moqueurs!/Contraltos: Adieu donc et bons jours aux tyrans de nos cœurs!/All four voices: Et bons jours!)

It's Lindor! it's Tircis! and all our conquerors!
It's Myrtil! it's Lydé! the queens of our hearts!
How provocative they are, how proud they are always!
How they dare reign over our fates and our days!

Pay attention! Observe the measure!
O the deadly insult!
The pace is less slow!
And the fall more certain!

We'll tone down their chatter!
Soon we'll be their lackeys!
How ugly they are! Sweet faces!
How crazy they are! Coquettish airs!

And it's always the same! And will be so always!
They love one another! They hate one another!
They curse their loves!
Farewell, Myrtil! Eglé! Chloe! Mocking demons!
Farewell and good days to the tyrants of our hearts!

== Notes, references and sources ==
=== Sources ===
- Fauré, Gabriel (1901). Pavane (PDF). Paris: Hamelle. OCLC 844205333. Archived from the original (PDF) on 2022-01-21.
- Fauré, Gabriel (1984) [1980]. Jean-Michel Nectoux (ed.). Gabriel Fauré: His Life Through Letters. London and New York: Marion Boyars. ISBN 978-0-7145-2768-0.
- Howat, Roy (2009). The Art of French Piano Music. New Haven and London: Yale University Press. ISBN 978-0-300-14547-2.
- Nectoux, Jean-Michel (1991). Gabriel Fauré – A Musical Life. Roger Nichols (trans.). Cambridge: Cambridge University Press. ISBN 0-521-23524-3.
- Norton, Leslie (2004). Léonide Massine and the 20th Century Ballet. Jefferson NC.: McFarland & Company. ISBN 0-7864-1752-8.
- Orledge, Robert (1979). Gabriel Fauré. London: Eulenberg. ISBN 978-0-903873-40-6.
