= Sicilienne (Fauré) =

1893 orchestral piece by Gabriel Fauré

Fauré in 1896

Sicilienne, Op. 78, is a short work by Gabriel Fauré, composed in 1893. It was originally an orchestral piece, written for a theatrical production that was abandoned. In 1898 Fauré arranged the unperformed music as a work for cello and piano, and in the same year incorporated it into his incidental music for Maurice Maeterlinck's play, Pelléas et Mélisande, in an orchestration for theatre orchestra. It took its final form as part of a suite arranged for full orchestra by Fauré, published in 1909.

== History and versions ==
In 1892 the manager of the Grand Théâtre, Paris, asked the composer Camille Saint-Saëns to write incidental music for a production of Molière's Le Bourgeois gentilhomme. Saint-Saëns was too busy to accept the commission, and successfully recommended his friend and former pupil Fauré. The music, which included the first version of the Sicilienne, was nearly complete when the theatre went bankrupt in 1893. The production was abandoned and the music remained unperformed.

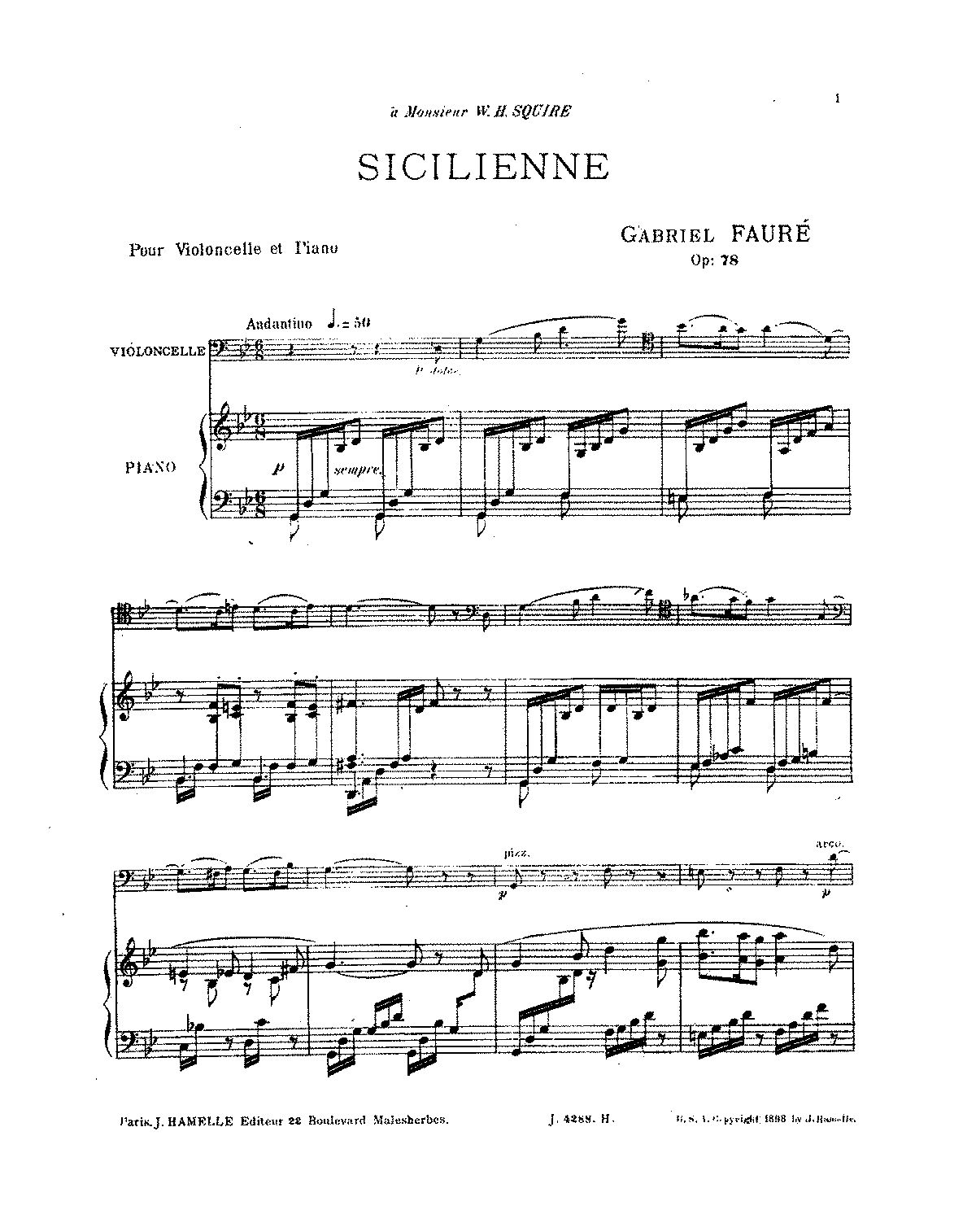
1898 arrangement for cello & piano

Five years later, Fauré arranged the work for cello and piano. The Fauré scholar Jean-Michel Nectoux writes that the transcription was made for the Dutch cellist Joseph Hollman. It was published in London and Paris in April 1898, with a dedication to the English cellist W. H. Squire.

At the same time, Fauré was working on incidental music for the first English production of Maurice Maeterlinck's play Pelléas et Mélisande, which opened in June 1898. Needing a lighthearted piece for one of the few playful scenes in the drama, he included the Sicilienne along with the new music he wrote for the production. His former pupil Charles Koechlin orchestrated the score for the theatre orchestra of 16 players.

The final form of the Sicilienne is in the four-movement Pelléas et Mélisande suite for full orchestra, arranged by Fauré and published in 1909. Nectoux notes that the final orchestration differs from Fauré's original 1893 version, written for chamber-sized theatre orchestra: in particular, the main theme is given to the oboe in the original score and to the flute in the final version in the suite.

The cello and piano version is in G minor in 6/8 time, typical of the sicilienne genre. The score is marked andantino with a metronome indication of dotted crotchet = 50. The full orchestral version, also G minor, is marked allegretto molto moderato. The playing time of the piece is typically between three and a half and four minutes.

The cello and piano and full orchestral versions of the Sicilienne have been recorded many times. There are also recordings of arrangements, not by Fauré, for bassoon and piano; cello and guitar; cello and harp; flute and guitar; flute and harp; flute and piano; guitar and orchestra; solo guitar; solo harp; oboe and piano; panpipes and piano; saxophone and orchestra; saxophone quartet; tuba and piano; viola and piano; vocal ensemble; and voice and harp.

== See also ==
- Works for cello and piano by Fauré

== Sources ==
- Duchen, Jessica (2000). Gabriel Fauré. London: Phaidon. ISBN 978-0-7148-3932-5.
- Jones, J. Barrie (1989). Gabriel Fauré – A Life in Letters. London: B T Batsford. ISBN 978-0-7134-5468-0.
- Nectoux, Jean-Michel (1991). Gabriel Fauré – A Musical Life. Roger Nichols (trans). Cambridge: Cambridge University Press. ISBN 978-0-521-23524-2.
