= Siciliana =

Classical musical style

Siciliana rhythms.

The siciliana [sitʃiˈljaːna] or siciliano (also known as sicilienne [sisiljɛn] or ciciliano) is a musical style or genre often included as a movement within larger pieces of music starting in the Baroque period. It is in a slow 6/8 or 12/8 time with lilting rhythms, making it somewhat resemble a slow jig or tarantella, and is usually in a minor key. It was used for arias in Baroque operas, and often appears as a movement in instrumental works. Originating from Sicily, the siciliana evokes a pastoral mood, and is often characterized by dotted rhythms that can distinguish it within the broader musical genre of the pastorale.

== History and notable examples ==
Investigations by Ottavio Tiby demonstrate the definitive Sicilian roots of the siciliana, tracing it back to 14th-century poetic-musical compositions inspired by the island's folk songs. Over four centuries, this original matrix—characterized by intense, pathetic passion—evolved by merging with the strambotto during the Renaissance and recitar cantando in the 17th century, before codifying into the Baroque instrumental form. Tiby also disproves its origin from a country dance, noting that the island's folk dances are markedly fast and lively. Although Raymond Monelle earlier attempts to trace the style to Sicily inconclusive — hypothesizing instead that it originated from Italian Renaissance madrigals (these madrigal rhythms may themselves derive from the dactylic hexameter of the epic poetry of ancient Greece and Rome) — studies have shown that the genre is named 'siciliana' in reference both to its actual geographical provenance and to the pastoral tradition of ancient Greek poetry, which had a recognized precursor in Theocritus of Syracuse.

=== Baroque era ===
Bach: Sonata in E♭ for flute and harpsichord – II. Siciliano
Performed by Alex Murray (traverso) and Martha Goldstein (harpsichord)

The siciliana was firmly established as a signifier of a pastoral context in the operas of Sicilian-born Alessandro Scarlatti — who inherited the musical influences of his native Palermo and transmitted them to the Neapolitan School, establishing its birth and massive European success — though only two of his slow arias in 12/8 are actually titled "aria siciliana" in the scores. Monelle notes that the texts of Scarlatti's siciliana arias are generally lamenting and melancholic. Several written references to the genre are known from earlier in the 1600s; and sicilianas are described in musical dictionaries since 1703.

Further examples of Baroque sicilianas are found in J. S. Bach's music: for instance, in his Sonata in G minor for solo violin, BWV 1001, in his Sonata in E♭ for flute and harpsichord, BWV 1031, and in his Concerto in E for harpsichord and strings, BWV 1053. Other well-known Baroque sicilianas are: the middle movement of Antonio Vivaldi's Concerto Grosso, Op. 3, No. 11, from L'estro armonico (which Bach then transcribed as his Concerto in D minor for organ, BWV 596), the first movement of Giuseppe Tartini's "Devil's Trill Sonata" for violin, and the last movement of Arcangelo Corelli's Christmas Concerto, Op. 6, No. 8.

=== Classical era ===
Mozart: "Ach, ich fühl's, es ist verschwunden" from The Magic Flute
Performed by Aulikki Rautawaara (soprano) and Orchester des Deutschen Opernhauses (Hans Schmidt-Isserstedt, conductor)

Mozart: Piano Sonata No. 11 in A major - I. Andante grazioso
performed by Bernd Krueger

Works in siciliana rhythm appear occasionally in the Classical period. Joseph Haydn, perhaps inspired by the bucolic associations of the genre, wrote a siciliana aria for soprano in his oratorio The Creation, "Nun beut die Flur das frische Grün" ("With verdure clad the fields appear"), to celebrate the creation of plants. For Mozart, the hesitating rhythm of the siciliana lent itself to the portrayal of grief, and some of Mozart's most powerful musical utterances are tragic sicilianas: the aria for soprano "Ach, ich fühl's, es ist verschwunden" ("Ah, my heart, 'tis gone forever") from The Magic Flute, the F♯ minor slow movement of the Piano Concerto, K. 488, the F minor Adagio from the Piano Sonata, K. 280, and the finale of the String Quartet in D minor, K. 421. In a more cheerful A major, he used a siciliana as the opening theme of his Piano Sonata, K. 331.

Other examples of Classical sicilianas are the third movement of Domenico Cimarosa's Oboe Concerto, the last movement of Carl Maria von Weber's Violin Sonata No. 5, and the second movement of Anton Reicha's Clarinet Quintet in F major, Op. 107.

The guitar virtuoso Mauro Giuliani (1781–1829) was very fond of the siciliana style and frequently composed in it. A notable example is the second movement of his Guitar Concerto No. 1 in A major, Op. 30. Another siciliana written for guitar (with vocal) is Franz Xaver Gruber's renowned Christmas carol, "Silent Night".

=== Romantic era ===
Brahms: Variations and Fugue on a Theme by Handel – Variation XIX
Performed by Martha Goldstein (piano)

At the beginning of the Romantic period, John Field inserted a refined siciliana ("Siciliano") in G minor in his Fourth Concerto for Piano and Orchestra (1814). Bernhard Crusell used a "siciliano" as a slow part in one of his clarinet duets (1821). Later in the Romantic era, Brahms wrote a siciliana as the 19th variation in his Variations and Fugue on a Theme by Handel for solo piano (1861). In another set of variations by Brahms, the orchestral Variations on a Theme by Haydn (1873), the seventh variation also takes the form of a siciliana. The second of Moritz Moszkowski's Trois Morceaux poétiques, Op. 42 (1887), is a "Siciliano".

Hélène's aria, "Merci, jeunes amies" ("Thank you, beloved friends") from Verdi's opera Les vêpres siciliennes is another example of a siciliana, suited to its setting, and is referred to as such in the score, even though it is popularly called a bolero. The opening aria of Mascagni's masterpiece Cavalleria rusticana is the Siciliana "O Lola".

Ernest Chausson composed a sicilienne as the second movement of his Concerto for Piano, Violin, and String Quartet, Op. 21 (1892). The orchestral suite from Pelléas et Mélisande by Gabriel Fauré includes his well-known Sicilienne, which he had composed for an incomplete project in 1893.

=== 20th–21st centuries ===
Rachmaninoff: Prelude in B Minor, Op. 32, No. 10
Performed by Wikipedia user "La Pianista" (piano)

Examples of sicilianas in 20th-century music include Igor Stravinsky's Serenata from his ballet Pulcinella, Ottorino Respighi's Siciliana from "Ancient Airs and Dances", Suite No. 3, and Malcolm Arnold's Siciliano from the Little Suite No. 1 for Brass. Sergei Rachmaninoff utilized siciliana style and rhythms in three of his Op. 32 Preludes for piano: the B♭ minor (No. 2), the B minor (No. 10), and the B major (No. 11). Maurice Duruflé's Suite for Organ (Op. 5) contains a Sicilienne notable for its Impressionist harmonies, and another prominent example is the middle movement of Paul Hindemith's Organ Sonata No. 2.

Hungarian composer György Kurtág references the style in a surprising way in his 1987 magnum opus, Kafka-Fragmente Op. 24, for soprano and violin in the movement "Der wahre Weg" ("The true path"). Nino Rota's "Godfather Waltz" is a classic siciliana at the start of his Grammy-winning score for the 1972 film. "Hedwig's Theme", composed by John Williams for the Harry Potter films, is also in the siciliana genre, with a particular similarity to Fauré's Sicilienne. Other notable examples of siciliana style include the "Intrada" and "Rhapsody" from Gerald Finzi's 1939 cantata Dies Natalis.
