= Le Plus Doux Chemin =

1904 song by Gabriel Fauré

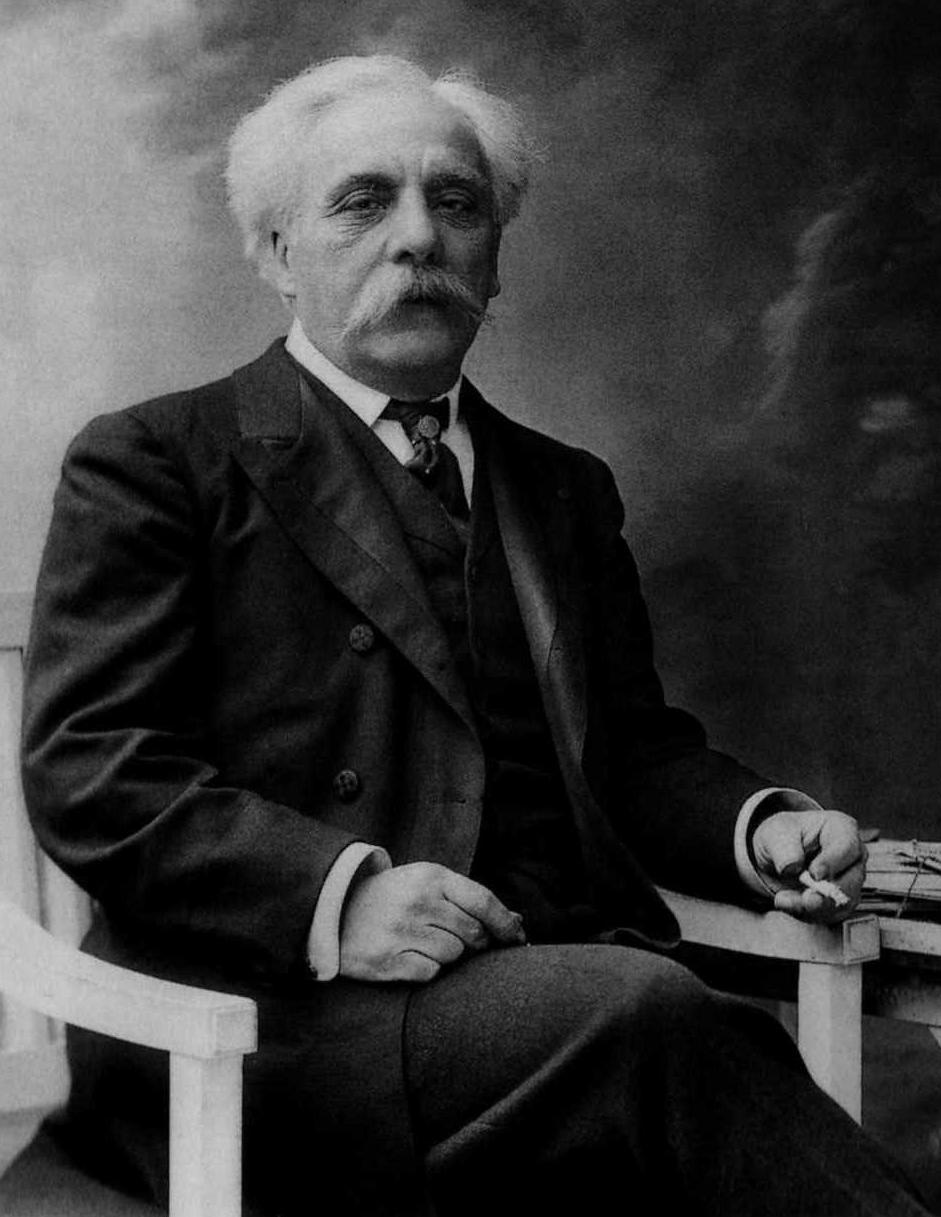
Fauré by Nadar, 1905.

"Le Plus Doux Chemin" ("The Sweetest Path"), Op. 87, No. 1, is a song by Gabriel Fauré, composed in 1904. It was originally for voice and piano accompaniment, and was later arranged by the composer for voice and full orchestra.

== Composition ==
In this song Fauré set words by the poet Paul Armand Silvestre. It was composed in 1904 for the amateur singer Emilie Girette after her marriage to the pianist Édouard Risler. Originally for voice and piano, it was later orchestrated by Fauré as part of his incidental music for Masques et bergamasques (1919). Fauré composed the song in the key of F minor, but it was first published (Hamelle, Paris, 1907) in E minor.

When Fauré orchestrated the song for Masques et bergamasques he wrote to his wife that it was not at all well known: "for just as pianists play the same eight or ten of my pieces, so singers all sing the same songs". The pianist Graham Johnson calls it an "enchantingly mournful serenade of a persistent, if unsuccessful lover … Fauré distilled to the essentials". Both Johnson and Vladimir Jankélévitch find an autumnal quality in the song, despite the reference to "la saison nouvelle". The Fauré expert Jean-Michel Nectoux rates it among the composer's most inspired songs, and groups it with "Le Ramier", Op. 87, No. 2 and "Chanson", Op. 94 as "a kind of homogeneous triptych … a cheerful but nostalgic farewell, the last sparks of the galant madrigal which Fauré had practised for so long".

Analysing the song, Johnson describes it as a madrigal with an accompaniment evoking "the gentle plucking of a lute, although the strength of the bass line, almost a counter-melody in itself, depends on the legato tone of a piano to make its effect."

== Text ==
French
Le Plus Doux Chemin

À mes pas le plus doux chemin
Mène à la porte de ma belle,
Et, bien qu'elle me soit rebelle,
J'y veux encor passer demain.

Il est tout fleuri de jasmin
Au temps de la saison nouvelle,
Et, bien qu'elle me soit cruelle,
J'y passe des fleurs à la main.

Pour toucher son cœur inhumain,
Je chante ma peine cruelle,
Et, bien qu'elle me soit rebelle,
C'est pour moi le plus doux chemin!

English
The Sweetest Path

The sweetest path for me
Leads to my fairest's door;
And though she resists me,
Tomorrow I shall go once more.

It is all in flower with jasmine
At the time of the new season,
And though she is cruel to me,
I go bearing flowers in my hand.

To touch her inhuman heart
I sing of my cruel pain,
And though she resists me,
This is for me the sweetest path!

== Sources ==
- Johnson, Graham (2005). Notes to Gabriel Fauré: Dans un parfum de roses – Mélodies. London: Hyperion Records. OCLC 690608417.
- Jones, J. Barrie (1989). Gabriel Fauré – A Life in Letters. London: B T Batsford. ISBN 978-0-7134-5468-0.
- Nectoux, Jean-Michel (1991). Gabriel Fauré – A Musical Life. Roger Nichols (trans). Cambridge: Cambridge University Press. ISBN 978-0-521-23524-2.
