= Roger Nichols =

Roger Nichols may refer to:

- Roger Nichols (musical scholar) (born 1939), English writer specialising in French music
- Roger Nichols (sound engineer) (1944–2011), American recording engineer, producer and inventor
- Roger Nichols (songwriter) (1940–2025), American composer and songwriter
- Roger Nichols (motorcyclist), British racer in the 1971–1976 Grand Prix motorcycle racing seasons
