= Madrigal (Fauré) =

Musical piece by Gabriel Fauré

Armand Silvestre's original 1878 poem, set by Fauré

"Madrigal", Op. 35 is a four-part song by Gabriel Fauré to words by Armand Silvestre, composed in 1883. It is written to be sung by vocal quartet or choir, with piano or – a later addition – an orchestral accompaniment. The song was reused in 1919 in the composer's Masques et bergamasques.

== Composition ==
Fauré had a liking for Silvestre's poems, and set several of them. (Note: Grove lists ten other Fauré settings of Silvestre poems, composed between 1878 and 1904.) This one, titled "Pour un chœur alterné" by the author, is from Silvestre's 1878 collection, La chanson des heures. With its theme of young men and women accusing each other of selfishness and cruelty in affairs of the heart, Fauré set it as a mischievous wedding present for his friend and ex-pupil André Messager, who was the dedicatee. The pianist and scholar Graham Johnson comments that the song has "the wittiness and suggestiveness of a speech by the best man at a wedding." The opening line of the music quotes a theme by J. S. Bach which may have had some private significance for the two friends. (Note: The theme is from the introduction to the cantata Aus tiefer Not, reused by Bach in Fugue No. 8 in the first book of the 48.)

The song was first performed at a concert of the Société Nationale de Musique on 12 January 1884 by the société's choir. It was published by Hamelle in the same year. The premiere of the orchestral version was given by solo quartet and the société's orchestra on 30 April 1892. Fauré later incorporated the song in its orchestral form into his incidental music to Masques et bergamasques (1919).

== Text ==
French
Madrigal

(Les jeunes gens)
Inhumaines qui, sans merci,
Vous raillez de notre souci,
Aimez ! Aimez quand on vous aime !

(Les jeunes filles)
Ingrats qui ne vous doutez pas
Des rêves éclos sur vos pas,
Aimez ! Aimez quand on vous aime !

(Les jeunes gens)
Sachez, ô cruelles Beautés,
Que les jours d'aimer sont comptés.
Aimez ! aimez quand on vous aime !

(Les jeunes filles)
Sachez, amoureux inconstants,
Que le bien d'aimer n'a qu'un temps.
Aimez ! aimez quand on vous aime !

(Ensemble)
Un même destin nous poursuit
Et notre folie est la même :
C'est celle d'aimer qui nous fuit,
C'est celle de fuir qui nous aime !

English
Madrigal

(The young men)
Inhuman women, who mercilessly
Mock our cares,
Love! Love when we love you!

(The young women)
Ungrateful men, who do not suspect
The dreams you provoke as you go,
Love! Love when we love you!

(The young men)
Know, O cruel beauties,
That the days of love are numbered.
Love! Love when we love you!

(The young women)
Know, fickle lovers,
That true love lasts a single season
Love! Love when we love you!

(All)
The same destiny pursues us
And our folly is the same:
It is loving those who flee us,
It is fleeing those who love us!

== Notes, references and sources ==
=== Sources ===
- Johnson, Graham (2009). Notes to Gabriel Fauré: The Songs and their Poets. Farnham, Surrey and Burlington, Vermont: Ashgate. ISBN 978-0-7546-5960-0.
- Jones, J. Barrie (1989). Gabriel Fauré – A Life in Letters. London: B T Batsford. ISBN 978-0-7134-5468-0.
- Nectoux, Jean-Michel (1991). Gabriel Fauré – A Musical Life. Roger Nichols (trans). Cambridge: Cambridge University Press. ISBN 978-0-521-23524-2.
