= Gérard Hekking =

French cellist (1879–1942)

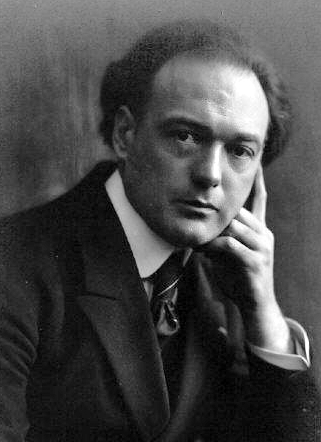
Gérard Hekking

Gérard Hekking (24 August 1879 – 5 June 1942) was a French cellist.

Born in Nancy, "He studied cello, first in The Hague with Professor Boumann, then in Paris in Delsart's class. Unanimously awarded first prize in 1898, he travelled as a concert performer, winning acclaim throughout Europe. Since 1905, Gérard Hekking has been a professor at the Royal Conservatory in Amsterdam, but has not given up his brilliant career as a virtuoso."

He served as first cellist of the Concertgebouw Orchestra from 1903 until 1914. In 1912 Alphons Diepenbrock composed his Berceuse (Le Seigneur a dit à son enfant) for him and his wife, a soprano. Among the works premiered by Hekking were Fauré's First and Second Cello Sonatas, in 1917 and 1921 respectively. Hekking composed some works, including Villageoise, Joujou mécanique, Danse pour les Sakharoff and Danse campagnarde, all for cello and piano.

From 1927 until his death Hekking taught cello at the Paris Conservatoire. Among his students were Pierre Fournier, Maurice Gendron and Paul Tortelier.

Hekking died in Paris in 1942, aged 62. He was the cousin of André Hekking and the nephew of Anton Hekking, both cellists.
