= Berceuse (Fauré) =

1879 musical composition

First edition, 1880

Berceuse, Op. 16, is a short piece by Gabriel Fauré, written in or about 1879. In its original version it is for solo violin and piano. The composer later published a version for violin and orchestra, and the work has been arranged by others for various musical forces. This berceuse is not connected, except for its title, with the berceuse in Fauré's Dolly Suite.

== History ==
The first well-known classical berceuse (literally a "cradle song") was by Chopin (in D♭ major, Op. 57 (1843–44). He set the pattern followed by Liszt and others in their berceuses: compound time, a soft dynamic level, a tonic pedal bass and a "rocking" accompaniment.

At the end of the 1870s Fauré, choirmaster and deputy organist at the Église de la Madeleine in Paris, was beginning to establish a reputation as a composer. His first violin sonata had been performed with great success at the Société Nationale de Musique in 1877, and his Berceuse was premiered there on 14 February 1880 by the violinist Ovide Musin with the composer at the piano. The Société presented Fauré's orchestrated version of the work on 24 April 1880, with Musin again the soloist and the orchestra conducted by Edouard Colonne.

The Fauré specialist Jean-Michel Nectoux comments that although the composer "attached no importance to this conventional little piece", it was taken up by violinists "from international soloists to café serenaders with an enthusiasm that bordered on mania". Nectoux wrote in 2004 that he had found more than sixty recordings of the Berceuse, ranging from Eugène Ysaÿe's in 1912 to Yehudi Menuhin's in the 1970s. Nectoux comments that the unexpected popularity of the piece had one unfortunate consequence and one beneficial one: it led some to dub Fauré a "salon composer", but it attracted the attention of the publisher Julien Hamelle. Until then, Fauré had been struggling to find a publisher, and for more than twenty years from 1880 Hamelle published his music.

The piece is dedicated to the composer's friend Hélène Depret, who, together with her husband, had introduced Fauré into influential musical circles at the beginning of his career.

== Music ==
In its original form, for violin con sordino (or optionally cello) and piano, the Berceuse, marked Allegretto moderato, is in D major throughout its 112-bar duration. Nectoux comments that the melodic ideas are weak and "although the rhythmic structure of the accompaniment is certainly quite ingenious" it is "too insistently presented".

Opening bars of Berceuse

The playing time varies considerably: a 1966 recording by Jacques Dumont and Germaine Thyssens-Valentin plays for 4 minutes and 13 seconds. A 2006 recording by Yayoi Toda and Tatsuya Hayashi plays for 2 m. 47 s. Most recorded performances are between these two in playing times: typical examples are those by Isaac Stern with Daniel Barenboim and the Orchestre de Paris, at 3 m. 27 s. and Renaud Capuçon and Michel Dalberto, at 3 m. 38 s.

In addition to Fauré's original and orchestral versions of the Berceuse, recordings have been made of arrangements for cello and guitar, flute and harp, flute and piano, flute, oboe and orchestra, solo guitar, guitar and dulcimer, oboe and harp, oboe and piano, panpipes and piano, solo piano, saxophone and piano, viola and piano, and vocalise and harp.

Another berceuse by Fauré is the first movement of his Dolly Suite; it was composed in 1864 and incorporated into the suite which he completed in the 1890s. The two berceuses are not thematically related to each other.

== Sources ==
- Nectoux, Jean-Michel (1991). Gabriel Fauré – A Musical Life. Roger Nichols (trans.). Cambridge: Cambridge University Press. ISBN 0-521-23524-3.
