= Berceuse =

Type of musical composition

A berceuse [bɛʁsøz] is "a musical composition usually in 6/8 time that resembles a lullaby". Otherwise it is typically in triple metre. Tonally most berceuses are simple, often merely alternating tonic and dominant harmonies; since the intended effect is to put a baby to sleep, wild chromaticism would be somewhat inappropriate. Another characteristic of the berceuse, for no reason other than convention, is a tendency to stay on the "flat side"; noted examples including the berceuses by Chopin, who pioneered the form, Liszt, and Balakirev, which are all in D♭.

== Music ==
- Berceuse pour deux notes qui cornent (for two notes which continue), for organ, JA 7, by Jehan Alain
- Berceuse de Jeanne, by Harrison Birtwistle
- Wiegenlied (Brahms), a cradle song, is a berceuse; it is better known in English as Brahms's Lullaby
- Berceuse, by Frank Bridge, for cello and piano
- Compositions by Ferruccio Busoni
  - Berceuse (in C major) Op. 2, for piano
  - Berceuse (Lullaby), for piano
  - Berceuse élégiaque
- Berceuse, for piano by Frédéric Chopin
- "Berceuse for the Infant Jesu" in A Little Suite for Christmas, by George Crumb
- Berceuse Heroique, for piano, by Claude Debussy
- Two compositions by Gabriel Fauré
  - Berceuse, Op. 16.
  - "Berceuse" section of Dolly Suite for Piano four-hands, Op. 56, No. 1, by Fauré. Sometimes transcribed for violin and piano: not to be confused with the Op. 16 work, above.
- Berceuse for an Unwanted Child (Reginald Foresythe) 1934
- Berceuse de Jocelyn, a lullaby from the opera "Jocelyn" by Benjamin Godard
- Berceuse de Jupiter, also known as the aria "Que Les Songes Heureux" from the opera "Philémon et Baucis", by Charles Gounod
- Grieg Lyric Pieces Op. 38 No. 1
- "Berceuse" from 114 Songs (1922) by Charles Ives
- Berceuse by Armas Järnefelt 1904
- "Berceuse" from 12 Transcendental Études by Sergei Lyapunov
- Berceuse sur le nom de Gabriel Fauré by Maurice Ravel for violin and piano
- "Berceuse" in Six pieces for violin and piano, Op 79, No. 6, by Jean Sibelius
- One of the excerpts from The Firebird, a ballet by Igor Stravinsky
- Berceuse for Solo Piano in A flat Major, Op. 72, No. 2, by Tchaikovsky
- Berceuse (sur les paroles classiques), from 24 Pieces in Free Style, for organ, by Louis Vierne
- Berceuse for Mallory, a big band jazz composition by Steve Spiegl
- French online radio station titled berceuses.com with lullabies for children

== Art ==
- La Berceuse, a series of paintings by Vincent van Gogh
