= Piano Trio (Fauré) =

Chamber work by Gabriel Fauré

Fauré

Gabriel Fauré's Piano Trio in D minor, Op. 120 is one of the composer's late chamber works. The first public performance of the piano trio was given by the pianist Tatiana de Sanzévitch, with Robert Krettly and Jacques Patté, in May 1923 for the Société Nationale de Musique in honour of the composer's 78th birthday. The following month it was performed by the celebrated trio of Alfred Cortot, Jacques Thibaud and Pablo Casals.

The work is dedicated to Mme Maurice Rouvier, widow of the former prime minister.

== History ==
Fauré had retired as director of the Paris Conservatoire in 1920. Although he had been reluctant to do so, it brought him more free time to devote to composition, and his final years were marked by the production of many substantial new works. Jacques Durand, his publisher, suggested in January 1920 that Fauré should compose a trio for piano, violin, and cello, and in April he began work, at first in Paris, and later when staying with friends in Argelès-sur-Mer in the south of France. Work was temporarily halted by an attack of pneumonia, after which Fauré went to his favourite resort, Annecy-le-Vieux, in August, resuming work on the piece. His original plan had been a trio for piano, cello and either a clarinet or violin, but he quickly abandoned the clarinet option and wrote for the classical piano trio. (Note: A recording with the originally envisaged clarinet replacing the violin was issued on the Naxos label in 2014.)

Fauré wrote to his wife, who remained in Paris, "The trouble is that I cannot work for long at a time. My worst tribulation is a perpetual fatigue." The musical scholar Roger Nichols comments that the composer's fatigue is not detectable in the completed work, except to the extent that "there are no more notes than necessary, according to the well-known Mozartian formula". After returning to Paris Fauré completed the trio in mid-February 1923. The premiere was given at a concert of the Société Nationale de Musique on 12 May given by three young graduates of the Conservatoire: Robert Krettly, violin, Jacques Patté, cello, and Tatiana Sanzévitch, piano. Fauré was ill, and could not attend. Durand published the work the same year. The Parisian newspaper Comoedia commented enthusiastically after the first performance, greeting "a beautiful work that enriches the chamber music repertory". The reviewer praised "the elegant clarity, the equilibrium of thought and the serenity" of Fauré's recent compositions, and commented on the composer's success in playing the most disparate musical ideas off against each other. Fauré was present at the performance the following year, given by the Cortot-Thibaud-Casals Trio.

== Structure ==
There are three movements:

1. Allegro ma non troppo
2. Andantino
3. Allegro vivo

The playing time of the trio is about 18 minutes.
