= String Quartet (Fauré) =

String quartet by Gabriel Fauré

Fauré in 1922

The String Quartet in E minor, Op. 121, is the only string quartet by Gabriel Fauré. Completed in 1924 shortly before his death at the age of 79, it is his final composition. His pupil Maurice Ravel had dedicated his String Quartet to Fauré in 1903, and he and others urged Fauré to compose one of his own; he declined on the grounds that it was too difficult. When he finally decided to write it, he did so in trepidation.

The quartet is in three movements, the last movement combining the functions of scherzo and finale. The work has been described as an intimate meditation on the last things, and "an extraordinary work by any standards, ethereal and other-worldly with themes that seem constantly to be drawn skywards."

== History ==
When Fauré was director of the Paris Conservatoire (from 1905 to 1920) he customarily left Paris for several weeks at the end of the academic year to compose in peace in quiet resorts. After his retirement he continued to retreat from Paris for bouts of sustained composition. The quartet was composed at Annecy-le-Vieux, and in Paris and Divonne-les-Bains between September 1923 and September 1924.

Throughout his career Fauré had composed for chamber forces. His works by 1923 included two piano quartets, two piano quintets, a piano trio, two violin sonatas, two cello sonatas and numerous smaller-scale chamber pieces. He had, however, always declined to attempt a string quartet. His pupil Maurice Ravel had dedicated his 1903 String Quartet to Fauré, and he and others urged Fauré to compose one of his own; Fauré refused, calling the task too difficult for him. On 9 September 1923 he wrote from Annecy to his wife, who remained in Paris, "I've started a Quartet for strings, without piano. This is a genre which Beethoven in particular made famous, and causes all those who are not Beethoven to be terrified of it." He worked on the piece, on and off for a year, finishing it on 11 September 1924, working long hours towards the end to complete it.

The first movement of the quartet to be completed was the central andante, which he wrote at Annecy between 9 and 13 September 1923. The music critic Roger Nichols comments that the sober, meditative tone of the andante is reflected in the two other movements that Fauré wrote later. After returning to Paris, Fauré began work on the first movement, for which he reused two themes from an unfinished violin concerto that he had begun and abandoned in 1878. He resumed work on the piece in the summer of the following year, first at Divonne-les-Bains and finally at Annecy, where he had begun work on it a year earlier. When the three movements were finished, he contemplated adding a separate scherzo, but decided against it, telling his wife, "The quartet is completed, unless I decide to have a little fourth movement which might have a place between the first and the second. But since it is in no way a necessity I shall not tire myself by searching for it, at least not at the moment."

The quartet was premiered after Fauré's death; he declined an offer to have it performed privately for him in his last days, as his hearing had deteriorated to the point where musical sounds were horribly distorted in his ear.

== Structure ==
The string quartet has three movements:

1. Allegro moderato
2. Andante
3. Allegro

=== I. Allegro moderato ===
The first movement, in 2/2 time, is in sonata form. The opening theme, played by the viola, is answered by the first violin. The normal sonata pattern follows, with the viola's original theme omitted from the recapitulation.

=== II. Andante ===
The second movement, in 4/4 time, is in no discernible traditional form. The opening theme is reprised half-way through the movement, but otherwise the andante winds a contemplative course through meandering scales and occasional octave jumps. The dynamics constantly change, with crescendos or diminuendos in the majority of bars. The Fauré scholar Jean-Michel Nectoux has said of the movement, "The Andante is one of the finest pieces of string quartet writing. From start to finish it bathes in a supernatural light. There is nothing that is not beautiful in this movement with its subtle variations of light-play, a sort of white upon white. ... The sublime music sinks out of sight, where it carries on, rather than seeming to come to an end".

=== III. Allegro ===
Like the opening movement, the finale is in sonata form, and like the andante it is in 4/4 time. It combines the function of scherzo as well as finale. The cello introduces and develops the scherzo theme over a pizzicato accompaniment. The central development section, unusually long in relation to the rest of the movement, combines the themes heard at the beginning of the movement. The work ends in a jubilant E major conclusion.

=== Timings ===
In performance, string quartets have varied widely in their tempi for the work. Of recordings in the CD catalogues in 2011, an example of a swift performance is that by the Amati Quartet, a 1993 performance on the Divox label, which plays for a total of 22 minutes and 18 seconds. Among the slower versions is that by the Medici Quartet (Nimbus, 1989) which is nearly seven minutes longer, at 29:10. (Note: Comparative timings of selected recordings: Ad Libitum Quartet (Naxos, 2000): 6:09; 9:39; and 9:19 (total 25:07); Amati Quartet (Divox, 1993): 5:56; 8:33; and 7:49 (total 22:18); Dante Quartet (Hyperion, 2008): 6:03; 8:34; and 8:19 (total 22:55); Medici Quartet (Nimbus, 1989): 7:30; 12:03; and 9:37 (29:10); Quatuor Ébène (Virgin, 2008): 6:32; 10:06; and 7:46 (24:24); Ysaÿe Quartet (Wigmore Hall Live, 2006): 6:19; 10:42; and 8:34 (25:35))

== Notes and references ==
Notes

== Sources ==
- Jones, J Barrie (1989). Gabriel Fauré – A Life in Letters. London: B. T. Batsford Ltd. ISBN 0-7134-5468-7.
- Nectoux, Jean-Michel (1991). Gabriel Fauré – A Musical Life. Roger Nichols (trans.). Cambridge: Cambridge University Press. ISBN 0-521-23524-3.
- Nichols, Roger (2008). Notes to Fauré and Franck String Quartets. London: Hyperion Records. OCLC 639788372.
- Perreau, Stephan (2000). Notes to Ravel and Fauré String Quartets. Hong Kong: Naxos Records. OCLC 189791192.
