= Shylock (Fauré) =

1890 suite by Gabriel Fauré

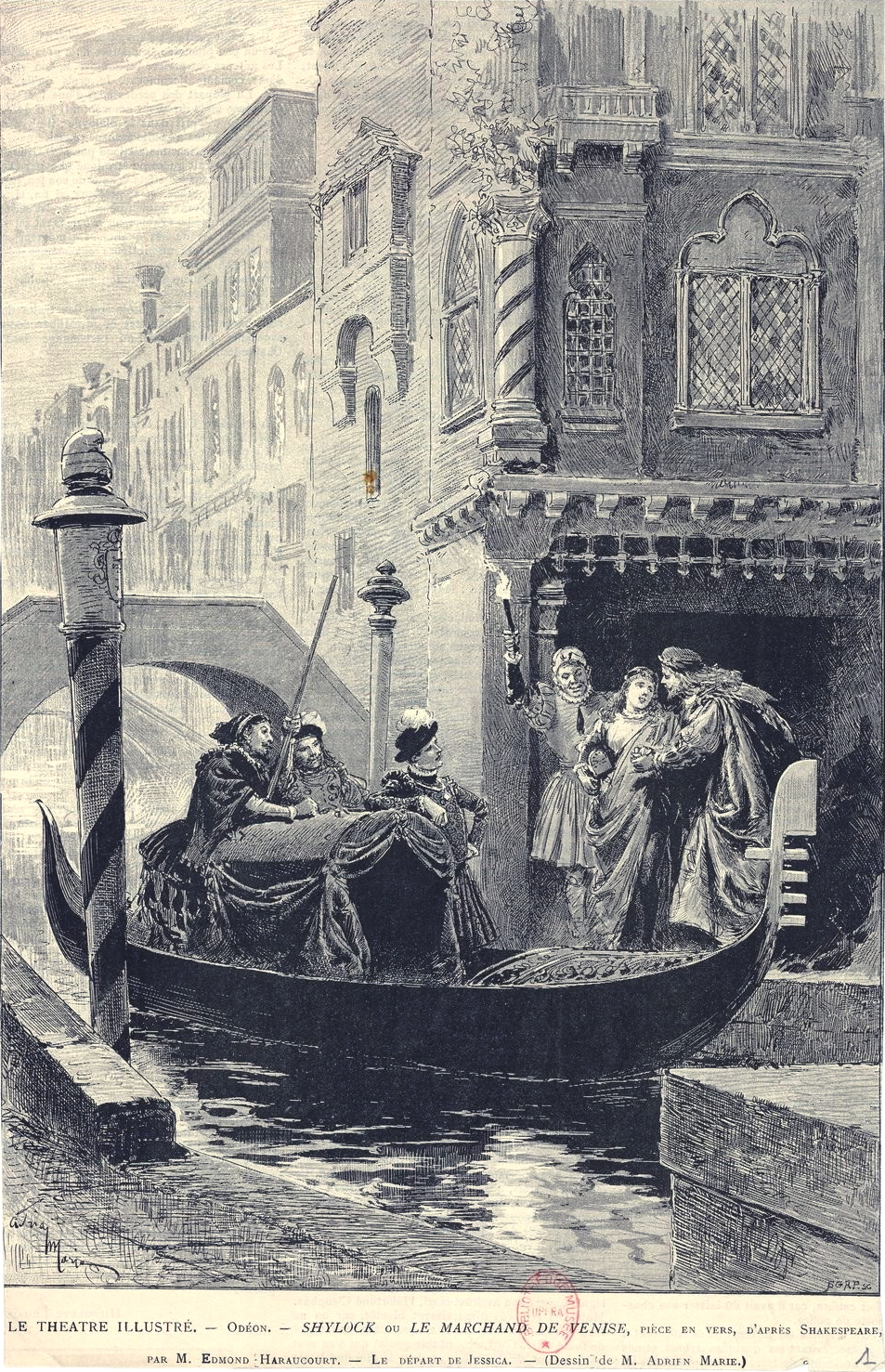
Scene from Act 1 of Shylock (1889) for which Fauré wrote the incidental music from which he drew the suite

The Shylock Suite, Op. 57 is a six-movement work by Gabriel Fauré, first performed in 1890. In addition to four purely orchestral movements it includes two serenades for solo tenor with orchestral accompaniment. The composer constructed the suite from incidental music he had written the previous year for Edmond Haraucourt's play Shylock, an adaptation of Shakespeare's The Merchant of Venice, presented at the Théâtre de l'Odéon in Paris. The theatre music had been written for a small orchestra, and Fauré greatly expanded the orchestration for the concert suite.

== Background ==
In 1889 Fauré composed incidental music for a new play, Shylock, an adaptation by Edmond Haraucourt of Shakespeare's The Merchant of Venice. The piece was premiered at the Théâtre de l'Odéon in Paris on 17 December 1889 in a lavish production starring Gabrielle Réjane as Portia. It ran for 56 performances, a substantial run by the standards of the Odéon, where short runs were the norm. (Note: Shylock was followed by 45 other productions at the Odéon during 1890, only 25 of which had runs totalling double figures.)

In his biography of Fauré, Robert Orledge observes that little is known about the composition of the score other than that "the superlative Nocturne" was composed in October 1889 after a short stay with the Vicomtesse Greffulhe at her country house. Fauré wrote to her, "I was looking for a most searching musical phrase, a Venetian moonlight, for Shylock, and I found it! It is the air in your park that inspired it." Before that, Fauré had composed the two serenades for the play, which he invited Haraucourt to hear in early October. The music for the casket scene was not at that point written.

The theatre orchestra for which Fauré composed the music was not large, consisting of 15 strings, five woodwinds, a horn and a trumpet. There were nine numbers in the score composed for the Odéon, and from these Fauré extracted and arranged a six-movement suite for full orchestra – with solo tenor in two movements – adding two harps, timpani and triangle. It was first performed at a concert of the Société nationale de musique in Paris on 17 May 1890, by the singer Julien Leprestre and the society's orchestra, conducted by Jean Gabriel-Marie.

== Music ==
The suite is scored for two flutes, two oboes, two clarinets, two bassoons, four horns, two trumpets, timpani, triangle, harp and strings. The playing time is a little under 20 minutes. Both Nectoux and Orledge comment that the inclusion of a soloist may militate against the suite's opportunities for frequent concert programming.

=== 1. Chanson ===
The suite opens with the first of two movements for singer as well as orchestra; it is marked allegro moderato (♩ = 96). The words, which bear no relation to anything in Shakespeare's play, are the invention of Haraucourt, a serenade sung by Venetian revellers. In his 2004 study of Fauré Jean-Michel Nectoux comments, "one feels for Fauré, having to set to music the worst verse in the play!" Despite this, Orledge and Nectoux both find this musically the better of the two vocal movements in the suite. In the Odéon score the piece was in C; for the suite, Fauré transposed it to B♭. The piece is opened by a cello solo, joined by the two harps before the tenor and the main orchestra enter.

Copyist's manuscript of opening page of Shylock music

Oh! les filles!
Venez, les filles aux voix douces,
c'est l'heure d'oublier l'orgueil et les vertus
et nous regarderons éclore dans les mousses
la fleur des baisers défendus
c'est Dieu qui les ordonne.

Oh! les filles!
il fait le Printemps pour les nids,
il fait votre beauté pour qu'elle nous soit bonne,
nos désirs pour qu'ils soient unis!

Oh! les filles,
hors l'amour rien n'est bonne sur la terre,
et depuis les soirs d'or jusqu'aux matins rosés
les morts ne sont jaloux dans leur paix solitaire
que du murmure des baisers!

Translation:

Oh! Girls!
Come on, soft-spoken girls,
it is time to forget pride and virtue
and we will see the flower of forbidden kisses
bloom in the mosses
it is God who commands it.

Oh! Girls!
It is spring for the nests,
it makes your beauty so that it is good for us,
our desires to be united!

Oh! Girls
Beside love nothing is good on earth,
and from the golden evenings to the rosy dawns
the dead are jealous, in their solitary peace,
of the murmur of kisses!

Fauré published versions of this, and the Madrigal from the third movement of the suite, with piano accompaniment in 1897. Nectoux finds the orchestral versions preferable: "the piano writing sounds thin and inadequate compared to that in most of his other accompaniments".

=== 2. Entr'acte ===
Despite its title in the suite, the music of the Entr'acte was not played between movements during the Odéon production. The printed programme for the premiere of the suite more accurately labelled it "Scene of the caskets". It was played in the theatre to accompany the action at Portia's house in Belmont, and is mostly pianissimo, intended as a background for spoken dialogue. It opens with a flourish of trumpets, before the main section of the movement begins with an allegretto (♩ = 84), fortissimo at first but subsiding to pianissimo after 16 bars and remaining so for the duration of the movement, except for two brief fortissimo episodes, which Nectoux conjectures accompanied the entrances of Portia's two royal suitors, the Princes of Morocco and Aragon. The movement ends softly.

=== 3. Madrigal ===
The second vocal number is another serenade, sung in Haraucourt's play by the Prince of Aragon under Portia's window. Nectoux describes it as "another insipid text, calling for another display of the 'galant' style". In Nectoux's view, Fauré's setting is less successful than in the first serenade, with melodic lines that droop and predictable harp entries in the accompaniment. It is marked allegretto; Fauré specifies no metronome mark. As in the first serenade, the original key was changed for the suite, in this case from F to E♭.

Réjane as Portia in the Odéon production of Shylock

Celle que j'aime a de beauté
plus que Flore et plus que Pomone,
et je sais, pour l'avoir chanté,
que sa bouche est le soir d'Automne
et son regard le nuit d'Eté!
Pour marraine elle eut Astarté,
pour patronne elle a la Madonne,
car elle est belle autant que bonne,
celle que j'aime,
elle écoute, rit et pardonne,
n'écoutant que par charité,
elle écoute, mais sa fierté
n'écoute ni moi, ni personne,
et rien encore n'a tenté,
celle que j'aime!

Translation:

The one I love has beauty
more than Flora and more than Pomona,
and I know, having sung of it,
that her mouth is an autumn evening
and her gaze a summer night!
For her godmother she had Astarte,
the Madonna as her patroness,
because she is beautiful as well as good,
the one I love,
she listens, laughs and forgives,
listening only out of charity,
she listens, but her pride
does not listen to me, nor anyone else,
and nothing has yet tried,
the one I love!

=== 4. Épithalame ===
An epithalamium is "a nuptial song or poem in praise of the bride and bridegroom, and praying for their prosperity". In Shylock this music followed Bassanio's success in winning Portia's hand. (Note: Haraucourt followed Shakespeare's plot in having Portia's three suitors identify which of three caskets – gold, silver or lead – contains her portrait. Bassanio correctly chooses the lead casket, after the two princes have both chosen wrongly.) Orledge describes this as the first of the truly inspired movements in the suite, with "unusually sonorous orchestration", rising to passionate heights and "almost Wagnerian in its opulence"; Nectoux suggests that it foreshadows the "calm lyricism" of Debussy's 1902 opera Pelléas et Mélisande. He adds that the marking in Fauré's manuscript, "adagio non troppo", seems preferable to the unqualified "adagio" in the published score of the suite".

=== 5. Nocturne ===
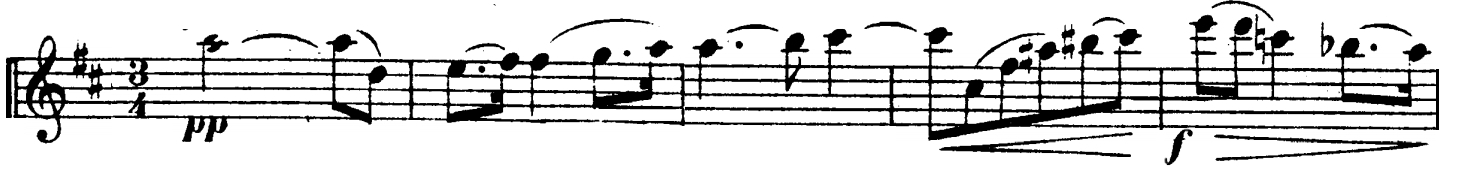
Main theme (violin) from the Nocturne

In the Odéon production the Nocturne was the music for the love scene between Jessica and Lorenzo in Portia's garden. (Note: As in Shakespeare's original, Jessica, Shylock's daughter, loves Lorenzo, a friend of the merchant Antonio and of Portia's suitor, Bassanio.) The movement is short – 37 bars in all – is in 3/4 time, in D major and marked andante molto moderato. By general consent it is the highlight of the suite. Orledge rates it as possibly the most beautiful movement in all Fauré's music for the theatre. Charles Koechlin wrote:

As for the Nocturne for strings alone, it is impossible to place this music, so profound and universally human is it. The intense tenderness of night here revealed was one of the most beautiful of Faure's inspirations.

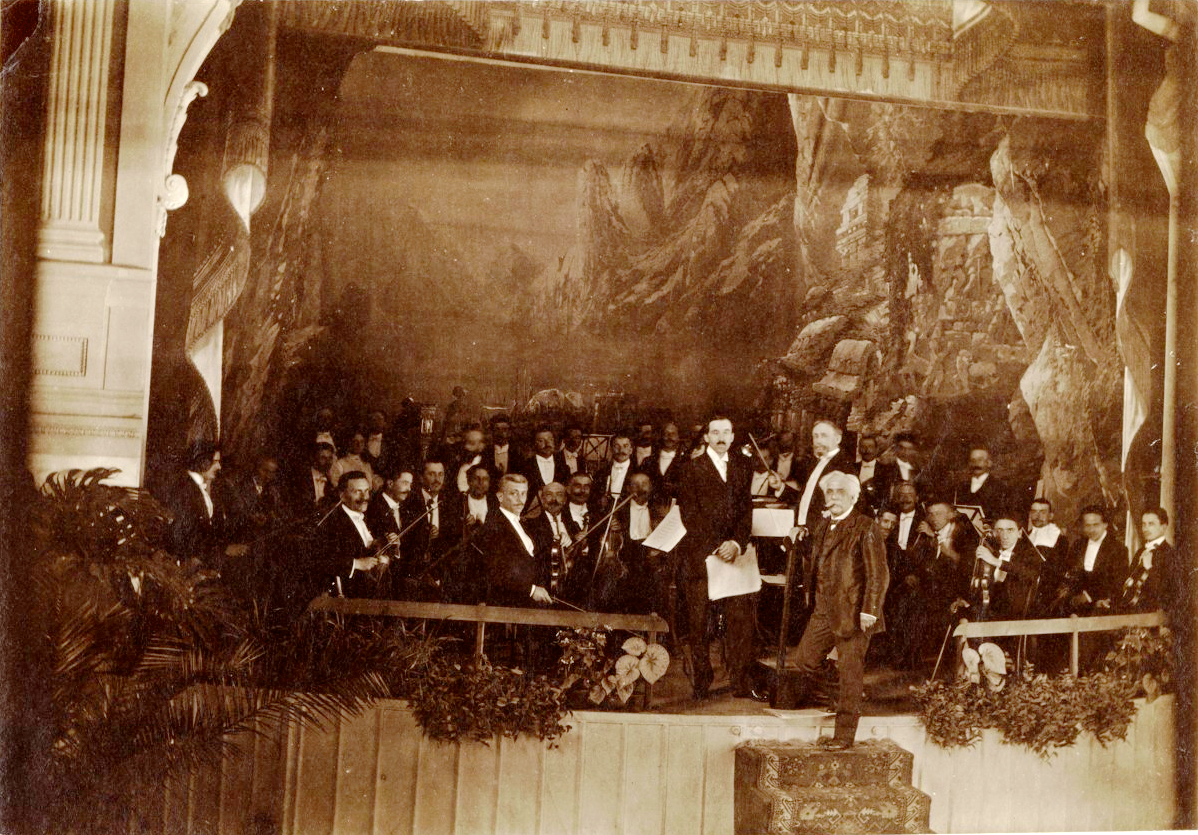
Fauré at a rehearsal of the Shylock music in 1909

The main theme haunted Fauré, and he returned to it in his Romance for Cello and Piano, Op. 69 (1894), and his mélodies "Soir", Op. 83/2 (1894) and "Exaucement", Op. 106/1, from Le Jardin clos, (1914).

=== 6. Finale ===
The finale, originally titled Aubade, was, like the Entr'acte, designed to be played beneath Haraucourt's dialogue. It was written for the last scene of the play, in which all the lovers assemble together. Fauré rewrote it considerably for the suite. Although he was not especially known for his orchestration, and in other pieces occasionally delegated the task of orchestrating to an assistant, the finale of the suite shows his orchestration at its most impressive. Orledge comments, "The astonishing brilliance, lightness and variety of the orchestration more than compensate for the two rather undistinguished themes, which both undergo exciting development in this sparkling perpetuum mobile".

== Ballet ==
In 1967 George Balanchine used the orchestral music from the Shylock suite and Fauré's Pelléas et Mélisande for his ballet Jewels for the New York City Ballet in the "Emeralds" section. The company's orchestra, conducted by Robert Irving, recorded the orchestral movements of Fauré's scores for a 1986 CD set.

== Recordings ==
Orchestra	Singer	Conductor	Year	Ref
Orchestre national de la Radiodiffusion française	Henri Legay	Désiré-Emile Inghelbrecht	1955	
Philharmonisches Staatsorchester Hamburg	Frederick Widemann	Heinz Steinecke	1958	
Strasbourg Festival Orchestra	Yves Duval	Marcel Levine	1961	
Orchestre de chambre de l'ORTF	Michel Sénéchal	Antonio de Almeida	1971	
Orchestre du Capitole de Toulouse	Nicolai Gedda	Michel Plasson	1980	
Orchestre symphonique français	Guy Fletcher	Laurent Petitgirard	1991	
RTE Sinfonietta	Lynda Russell (soprano)	John Georgiadis	1995	
Sinfonieorchester Basel	Benjamin Bruns	Ivor Bolton	2017	

In 2005 a recording of the Shylock Suite was released in which the orchestra was replaced by piano accompaniment. In the 1890s Fauré's publisher, Hamelle, issued transcriptions for piano four hands of the four orchestral movements made by Léon Boëllmann, who had arranged other orchestral music of Fauré for Hamelle. The 2005 recording features Jean-Paul Fouchécourt as tenor soloist, accompanied by Graham Johnson in Fauré's piano arrangements of the serenades; Boëllmann's transcriptions of the remaining four movements are played by Johnson and Ronan O'Hora.

Excerpts from the suite have been issued on records. In April 1932 Piero Coppola conducted the Orchestre de la Société des Concerts du Conservatoire in recordings of the four orchestral movements. The four movements were recorded again in 1986 by Irving and the New York City Ballet Orchestra (see "Ballet", above). WorldCat lists recordings of the Nocturne, conducted by John Barbirolli, Enrique Bátiz, Philippe Gaubert, Jean-Jacques Kantorow and Thomas Schippers. There are also recordings of the Nocturne arranged for organ solo and for cello and piano.

== Notes, references and sources ==
=== Sources ===
- Duchen, Jessica (2000). Gabriel Fauré. London: Phaidon. ISBN 978-0-71-483932-5.
- Fauré, Gabriel (1897). Shylock, Suite Op. 57: Full score (PDF). Paris: Hamelle. OCLC 305056.
- Fauré, Gabriel (1984) [1980]. Jean-Michel Nectoux (ed.). Gabriel Fauré: His Life Through Letters. London and New York: Marion Boyars. ISBN 978-0-7145-2768-0.
- Koechlin, Charles (1945) [1927]. Gabriel Faure. London: Dobson. OCLC 906350200.
- Nectoux, Jean-Michel (1991). Gabriel Fauré: A Musical Life. Cambridge: Cambridge University Press. ISBN 978-0-521-23524-2.
- Noël, Edouard; Edmond Stoullig (1890). Les Annales du théâtre et de la musique, 1889. Paris: Charpentier. OCLC 172996346.
- Noël, Edouard; Edmond Stoullig (1891). Les Annales du théâtre et de la musique, 1890. Paris: Charpentier. OCLC 172996346.
- Orledge, Robert (1979). Gabriel Fauré. London: Eulenberg. ISBN 978-0-903873-40-6.
- Taper, Bernard (1996). Balanchine: A Biography. Berkeley: University of California Press. ISBN 978-0-52-020639-7.
