= Dolly (Fauré) =

Suite for piano duet by Gabriel Fauré

Fauré in the 1890s

The Dolly Suite, Op. 56, is a collection of pieces for piano duet by Gabriel Fauré. It consists of six short pieces, written or revised between 1893 and 1896, to mark the birthdays and other events in the life of the daughter of the composer's mistress, Emma Bardac.

An orchestral version of the suite was scored in 1906 by Henri Rabaud, and has, like the original piano duet version, been the subject of many recordings. The best-known section of the suite, the Berceuse, has been arranged for several combinations of instruments. In the United Kingdom it became famous as the play-out tune to the BBC radio programme Listen with Mother.

The suite consists of six short pieces, each with its own title: Berceuse, Mi-a-ou, Le jardin de Dolly, Kitty-valse, Tendresse, and Le pas espagnol. The complete suite takes about fifteen minutes to perform.

== Analysis ==
Berceuse from Dolly
The Berceuse, in a transcription for solo piano by Alfred Cortot

Fauré wrote or revised the pieces between 1893 and 1896, for Régina-Hélène Bardac (1892–1985), known to her family as Dolly (she was later to become Madame Gaston de Tinan), the young daughter of the singer Emma Bardac, with whom Fauré had a long-running affair. He was in the practice of sending pieces of music, in manuscript, to mark Dolly's birthdays and other family occasions.

In a marked departure from his customary practice, Fauré gave each of the six movements a descriptive, sometimes whimsical, title. Ordinarily he disliked fanciful titles for musical pieces, and maintained that he would not use even such generic titles as "barcarolle" unless his publishers insisted upon them. His son Philippe recalled, "he would far rather have given his Nocturnes, Impromptus, and even his Barcarolles the simple title Piano Piece no. so-and-so".

=== 1. Berceuse ===
Allegretto moderato. The Berceuse, marking Dolly's first birthday, was a very early piece, composed in 1864 for Suzanne Garnier, the daughter of a family friend. In 1893 Fauré made some small amendments and changed its title from "La Chanson dans le jardin" to "Berceuse" – that is, a cradle song (lullaby).

=== 2. Mi-a-ou ===
Allegro vivo. "Mi-a-ou" was written for Dolly's second birthday in June 1894. The title does not refer to a pet cat, as has often been supposed, but to Dolly's attempts to pronounce the name of her elder brother Raoul, who later became one of Fauré's favourite pupils. The young Dolly called her brother Messieu Aoul, which Fauré took as the original title for the piece. In his finished manuscript the title is shortened to "Miaou" (without hyphens). The Fauré scholar Robert Orledge writes that the title "Mi-a-ou", like that of the "Kitty-valse" later in the suite, is the responsibility of Fauré's publisher, Julien Hamelle.

=== 3. Le jardin de Dolly ===
Andantino. The third section of the suite, "Le jardin de Dolly", was composed as a present for New Year's Day 1895. It contains a quotation from Fauré's First Violin Sonata, composed 20 years earlier. The Fauré scholar Jean-Michel Nectoux considers this "perhaps the jewel of the suite, with its lovely tune, moving harmonies and limpid, subtle counterpoint."

=== 4. Kitty-valse ===
Tempo di valse. The fourth piece is no more feline in its reference than "Mi-a-ou". The Bardacs' pet dog was called Ketty, and in Fauré's manuscript the piece is called "Ketty-Valse". Nectoux calls this piece "a kind of whirling portrait" of the animal.

=== 5. Tendresse ===
Andante. "Tendresse", written in 1896, was originally dedicated to Adela Maddison, wife of a music publisher. Like "Le Jardin de Dolly", this piece is lyrical, but is in a more modern style, making use of chromaticism of the kind Fauré later deployed in his Nocturnes.

=== 6. Le pas espagnol ===
Allegro. The suite ends with a Spanish dance, a lively and picturesque piece of scene-painting, in the style of España by Fauré's friend Emmanuel Chabrier.

== Premiere and later versions ==
Fauré and Mlle Lombard in 1913

The first public performance of the suite was given by Alfred Cortot and Édouard Risler in 1898. Fauré himself enjoyed taking part in performances of the work, not only in public but en famille with the young children of his friends. The photograph opposite shows the composer playing the secondo part to the primo of the young Mlle Lombard, daughter of his host and hostess at Trevano, Lake Lugano, in 1913.

Cortot arranged the work for solo piano in 1899, and in 1906 Henri Rabaud orchestrated the work for full symphony orchestra. This version received its first public performance conducted by Léon Jehin in Monte Carlo in December, 1906, and was later used to accompany "an ingenious ballet" with a story by Louis Laloy at the Théâtre des Arts in Paris.

The Berceuse was the closing theme for the long-running BBC Light Programme (and later Home Service) radio programme for small children Listen with Mother (1950–1982). It is performed in the film Bicentennial Man by Andrew and Little Miss. Although it was written as a piano duet, there have been numerous arrangements of the Berceuse for other instruments and ensembles. Examples include versions for piano and glockenspiel by Evelyn Glennie and for two guitars recorded by Julian Bream and John Williams.

== Recordings ==
Recordings of the suite in its original form for piano duet include those by Geneviève Joy and Jacqueline Bonneau (1955), Robert and Gaby Casadesus (1962), Kathryn Stott and Martin Roscoe (1995), Pierre-Alain Volondat and Patrick Hooge (2000), as well as Pascal and Ami Rogé.

Among recordings of the orchestral version are those by the Orchestre national de l'ORTF conducted by Sir Thomas Beecham (1959), the Boston Symphony Orchestra conducted by Seiji Ozawa (1988), and the BBC Philharmonic conducted by Yan Pascal Tortelier (1995).
