= Mirages (Fauré) =

1919 song cycle by Gabriel Fauré

Gabriel Fauré in 1922

Mirages, Op. 113, is a song cycle by Gabriel Fauré, of four mélodies for voice and piano. Composed in 1919, the cycle is based on four of the poems from the collection of the same name by Renée de Brimont.

== Composition ==
The song cycle was composed in July and August 1919 while staying at Annecy-le-Vieux, at the invitation of Fernand Maillot and his wife Louise. Fauré also started the Piano Quintet No. 2 during this stay. It was the first of several summers that he spent composing there.

Fauré's interest in de Brimont's poetry was first stimulated by Gabriel Hanotaux, to whose wife the song cycle was dedicated. It was published by Durand in 1919.

== Settings ==
Fauré's settings from the two parts of de Brimont's collection are as follows:

1. "Cygne sur l'eau" (from De l'eau et des paysages)
2. "Reflets dans l'eau" (from De l'eau et des paysages)
3. "Jardin nocturne" (from De l'eau et des paysages)
4. "Danseuse" (from Des songes et des paroles)

== Premiere ==
Mirages had its premiere at the Société Nationale de Musique on 27 December 1919, sung by Madeleine Grey. Fauré was the pianist for the premiere, as he usually was for his songs. However by this time his hearing impairment was total, and this was the last time he played at an event of the Société.

== Sources ==
- Johnson, Graham (2009). Gabriel Fauré: The Songs and their Poets. London: Guildhall School of Music and Drama. ISBN 978-0-7546-5960-0.
- Nectoux, Jean-Michel (2004). Gabriel Fauré: A Musical Life. Cambridge: Cambridge University Press. ISBN 0-521-61695-6.
- Orledge, Robert (1979). Gabriel Fauré. London: Eulenburg Books. ISBN 0-903873-40-0.
