= Pelléas et Mélisande (Fauré) =

1898 musical suite by Gabriel Fauré

Fauré at about the time of his Pelléas et Mélisande music

Pelléas et Mélisande, Op. 80 is a suite derived from incidental music by Gabriel Fauré for Maurice Maeterlinck's play of the same name. He was the first of four leading composers to write music inspired by Maeterlinck's drama. Debussy, Schoenberg and Sibelius followed in the first decade of the 20th century.

Fauré's music was written for the London production of Maeterlinck's play in 1898. To meet the tight deadline of the production, Fauré reused some earlier music from incomplete works and enlisted the help of his pupil Charles Koechlin, who orchestrated the music. Fauré later constructed a four-movement suite from the original theatre music, orchestrating the concert version himself.

== History ==
The score was commissioned in 1898 by Mrs Patrick Campbell for the play's first production in English, in which she starred with Johnston Forbes-Robertson and John Martin-Harvey. (Note: The play had been performed in London in French two years earlier by the Théâtre de l'Œuvre company. The English translation given by Stella Campbell's company was by J W Mackail.)

Mrs Campbell, who was to sing in the production, had invited Debussy to compose the music, but he was busy working on his operatic version of Maeterlinck's play, and declined the invitation. Debussy in his letter said: "j'aimerai toujours mieux une chose où, en quelque sorte, l'action sera sacrifiée à l'expression longuement poursuivie des sentiments de l'âme. Il me semble que là, la musique peut se faire plus humaine, plus vécue, que l'on peut creuser et raffiner les moyens d'expression" ("I will always prefer a thing in which, in a way, the action is sacrificed for the expression sought after by the soul. It seems to me that in that case, the music is more human, more lived, that we can refine our means of expression").

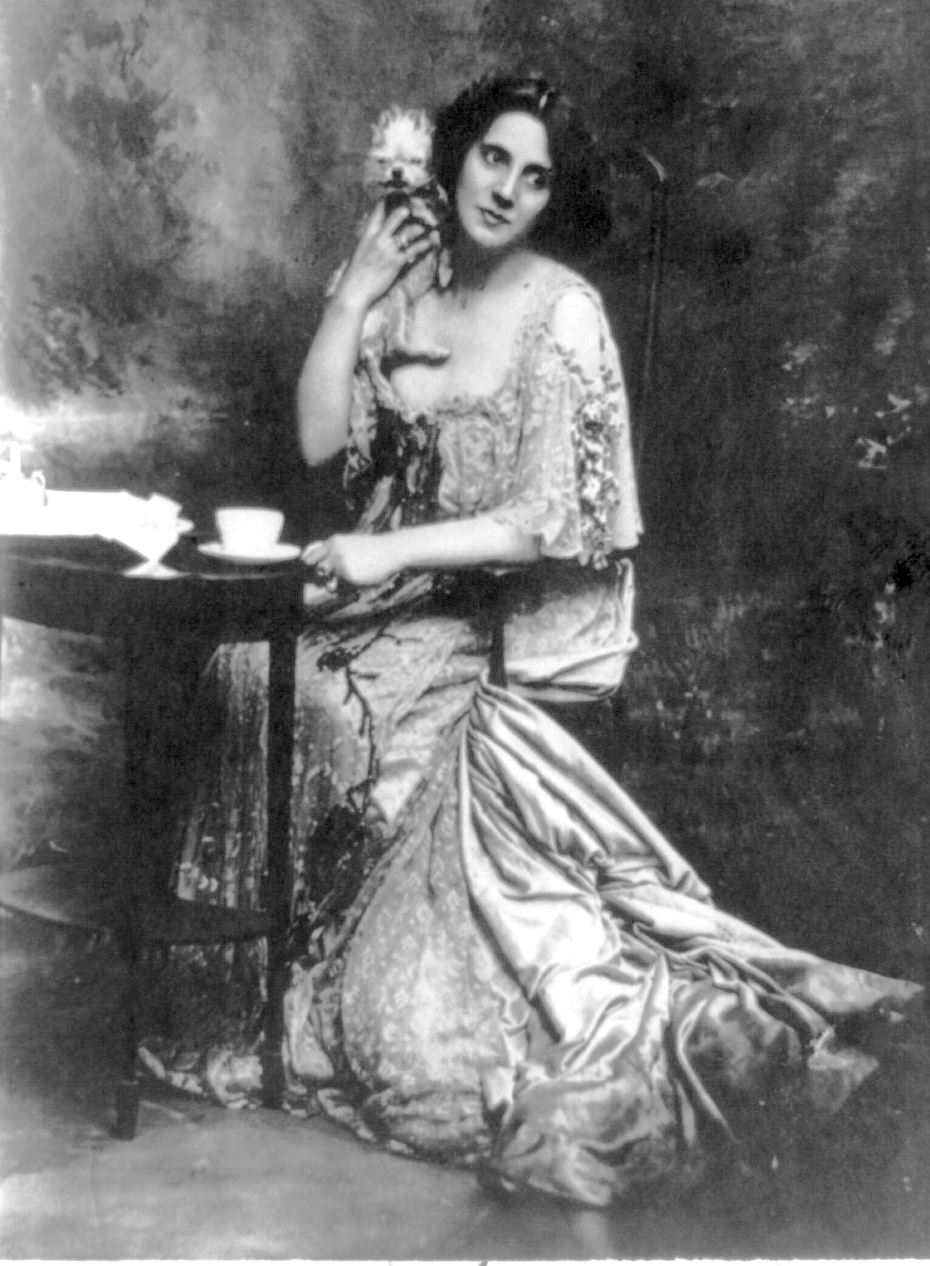
Mrs Patrick Campbell

Fauré was in London in March and April 1898, and was introduced to Mrs Campbell by the musical benefactor Frank Schuster. Fauré accepted her invitation to compose the music for the production, despite the tight deadline – the play was to open in June of that year. He wrote to his wife, "I will have to grind away hard for Mélisande when I get back. I hardly have a month and a half to write all that music. True, some of it is already in my thick head!" It was Mrs Campbell who commissioned Fauré to write the incidental music to the play. She "felt sure M. Gabriel Fauré was the composer needed."

As he often did, Fauré reused music written for incomplete or unsuccessful works. A sicilienne from his unfinished 1893 score for Le Bourgeois gentilhomme was the most substantial piece retrieved for Pelléas et Mélisande. Pressed for time, and never greatly interested in orchestrating, Fauré enlisted the help of his pupil Charles Koechlin, who accompanied him to London. The complete incidental music comprised 19 pieces (2 are missing) of varying length and importance.

Fauré conducted the orchestra for the premiere, at the Prince of Wales's Theatre on 21 June 1898. Mrs Campbell was enchanted by his music, in which, she wrote, "he had grasped with most tender inspiration the poetic purity that pervades and envelops M. Maeterlinck's lovely play". She asked him to compose further theatre music for her in the first decade of the 20th century, but to her regret his workload as director of the Paris Conservatoire made it impossible. Over the next 14 years, she revived the play, always using Fauré's score. In 1904, the music was used for a production of the original French version of the play, starring Sarah Bernhardt. Fauré's incidental music was used again in Georgette Leblanc's production of the play in the cloisters and gardens of Saint-Wandrille abbey in August 1910, conducted by Albert Wolff.

Fauré conducted the Pelléas et Mélisande suite in a programme that also included his Requiem and Shylock suite on 11 March 1909 at the Gran Teatre del Liceu in Barcelona, Spain.

There are two different versions of the original theatre score for Pelléas et Mélisande in existence. The first is Koechlin's autograph of the orchestral score, dating from May and June 1898, and incorporating several rough sketches by Fauré in short score. The second is the conducting score used by Fauré in London; this is also a manuscript in Koechlin's handwriting.

Fauré later reused the music for Mélisande's song in his 1906–10 song cycle La chanson d'Ève, adapting it to fit words by the Symbolist poet Charles van Lerberghe.

After Fauré, three other leading composers completed works inspired by Maeterlinck's drama: Debussy's opera (1902), Schoenberg's early tone poem (1903) and Sibelius's incidental music (1905).

== Suite ==
After the run of the play in London, Fauré drew on the music for a short orchestral suite, which he orchestrated himself, using Koechlin's London score as a starting point. The original orchestration for the London production consisted of two flutes, one oboe, two clarinets, one bassoon, two horns, two trumpets, timpani, harp and string quartet. Fauré reorchestrated for larger forces, including a normal string complement and second oboe, second bassoon and third and fourth horns. He also rewrote several passages, notably the climaxes in the first, third and fourth movements.

The suite at first consisted of the Prélude, Fileuse (entr'acte to Act 3) and La mort de Mélisande (entr'acte to Act 4). In this form it was premiered at the Concerts Lamoureux in February 1901. Fauré was not happy with the performance, telling his wife that the conductor, Camille Chevillard did not really understand the music. Fauré later added the Sicilienne. This version of the suite was published in 1909. The suite is sometimes performed with the addition of Mélisande's song "The King's three blind daughters", in Koechlin's orchestration. (Note: Koechlin made a new orchestration of the song in 1938 as his Op. 159 bis.)

The suite, along with Faure's Shylock, furnishes the music for George Balanchine's "Emeralds," the first section of his full-length ballet Jewels.

=== Prélude (quasi adagio) ===
The Prélude is based on two themes; the first is tightly restricted, with no large melodic intervals between successive notes. The critic Gerald Larner suggests that this theme reflects Mélisande's introverted personality. The second theme is introduced by a romantic solo cello with woodwind, and may, in Larner's view represent Mélisande as first seen by her future husband, Golaud. The horn calls near the end of this movement may suggest Golaud's discovery of Mélisande in the forest.

=== Fileuse (andantino quasi allegretto) ===
La Fileuse is an orchestral representation of a spinning song. The Fauré scholar Jean-Michel Nectoux notes that, although Debussy omits it in his operatic version, Mélisande is shown at her spinning wheel in Maeterlinck's play. A gentle oboe melody is accompanied by the strings, who maintain a theme imitative of spinning.

=== Sicilienne (allegro molto moderato) ===
The movement, although in the traditionally sad key of G minor, represents, in Larner's view, "the one moment of happiness shared by Pelléas and Mélisande". Nectoux writes that although the piece was reused from an earlier work (incidental music to Molière's Le Bourgeois Gentilhomme) very few people would guess that it was not composed for Pelléas and Mélisande, so appropriate is it to its purpose. This is the movement of the suite that differs least from Koechlin's London score; Fauré made only minor textual amendments to it.

=== La mort de Mélisande (molto adagio) ===
The last movement, in D minor, is inescapably tragic, with a theme of lamentation for clarinets and flutes. There are echoes of Mélisande's song throughout the movement. The opening theme returns fortissimo on the strings "before a last echo of the song and a sadly modal approach on solo flute to the final chord" (Larner). This movement was played at Fauré's own funeral.

== Notes and references ==
Notes

== Sources ==
- Avis, Peter (2001). Notes to Fauré Orchestral Works and Incidental Music. London: EMI. OCLC 52192925.
- Campbell, Mrs Patrick (1922). My Life and Some Letters. New York: Dodd Mead. OCLC 1874911.
- Debussy, Claude (1980). Lettres 1884–1918. Paris: Hermann. ISBN 978-2-7056-5918-9.
- Jones, J Barrie (1989). Gabriel Fauré – A Life in Letters. London: B. T. Batsford Ltd. ISBN 0-7134-5468-7.
- Nectoux, Jean-Michel (1991). Gabriel Fauré – A Musical Life. Roger Nichols (trans.). Cambridge: Cambridge University Press. ISBN 0-521-23524-3.
- Opstad, Gillian (2009). Debussy's Melisande. The lives of Georgette Leblanc, Mary Garden and Maggie Teyte. Woodbridge, UK: Boydell Press. ISBN 978-1843834595.
