= Élégie (Fauré) =

1883 musical work by Gabriel Fauré

Fauré in early middle age

The Élégie (Elegy), Op. 24, was written by the French composer Gabriel Fauré in 1880, and first published and performed in public in 1883. Originally for cello and piano, the piece was later orchestrated by Fauré. The work features a sad and somber opening and climaxes with an intense, tempestuous central section before returning to the elegiac opening theme in C minor.

== Composition ==
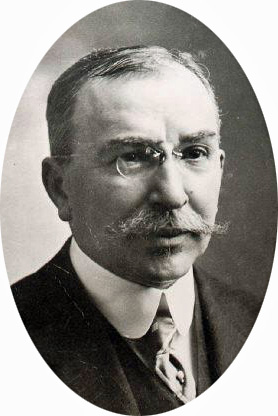
Jules Loeb, dedicatee and cellist at the premiere

Pablo Casals, who premiered the orchestral version

In 1880, having completed his First Piano Quartet, Fauré began work on a cello sonata. His frequent practice was to compose the slow movement of a work first, and he did so for the new sonata. The completed movement was probably premiered at the salon of Camille Saint-Saëns in June 1880. The movement, like the quartet, is in the key of C minor. Whether the rest of the sonata would have been in that key is unknown: Fauré never completed it, and in January 1883, the slow movement was published as a stand-alone piece under the title Élégie.

The first performance of the work under its new title was given at the Société Nationale de Musique in December 1883 by the composer and the cellist Jules Loeb to whom the piece is dedicated. (Note: Jules-Léopold Loeb (13 May 1852 – 4 November 1933) later became cello professor at the Paris Conservatoire, where his pupils included André Navarra in the 1920s.) The Élégie was a great success from the outset. The conductor Édouard Colonne asked Fauré for a version for cello and orchestra. Fauré agreed, and that version was premiered at the Société Nationale in April 1901, with Pablo Casals as a soloist and the composer as conductor. This piece has also been performed by other eminent cellists like Jacqueline du Pré and Yo-Yo Ma.

== Musical structure ==
Élégie
Performed by Hans Goldstein (cello) and Eli Kalman (piano)

The piece is in the AABA CC Trans-D AC'C'coda form, in which the musical material of the beginning returns to close the piece after a contrasting middle section. The opening is a somber, long-breathed melody. The cello carries the main thematic material, with the piano providing a harmonically varied accompaniment. In the major-key middle section, the piano bears the melodic theme before it passes to the cello. The middle section ends with a forceful passage in which the piano and cello exchange vehement themes. The dynamics remain loud as the first section returns, but the quiet sombreness of the opening soon takes over. The repeated opening theme is matched with some of the rhythmic features carried over from the middle section. The work ends in an atmosphere of calm.

The orchestral version of the work requires two flutes, two oboes, two clarinets, two bassoons, four horns and strings to accompany the cellist.

The Fauré specialist Jean-Michel Nectoux writes that the Élégie was one of the last works in which the composer allowed himself "such a direct expression of pathos." Nectoux regards the piece as "one of the last manifestations of French musical Romanticism. From now on, Fauré's music was to be more introverted and discreet."

== Notes and references ==
Notes

Sources

- Nectoux, Jean-Michel (1991). Gabriel Fauré: A Musical Life. Translated by Roger Nichols. Cambridge: Cambridge University Press. ISBN 0-521-23524-3.
