= Roger Nichols (musical scholar) =

English musicologist (born 1939)

Roger David Edward Nichols (born 6 April 1939) is an English musicologist, critic, translator and author. After an early career as a university lecturer he became a full-time freelance writer in 1980. He is particularly known for his works on French music, including books about Claude Debussy, Olivier Messiaen, Maurice Ravel, Francis Poulenc and the Parisian musical scene of the years after the First World War. Among his translations are the English versions of the standard biography of Gabriel Fauré by Jean-Michel Nectoux and of Harry Halbreich's study of Arthur Honegger.

== Life and career ==
Nichols was born in the English city of Ely, Cambridgeshire, the son of Edward Nichols and his wife Dorothy, née West, who were respectively a lawyer and an accountant. He was educated at Harrow, where he read classics, and Worcester College, Oxford, where he studied under Edmund Rubbra. In 1964, he married Sarah Edwards, a teacher; they have two sons and a daughter. After graduating he became a schoolmaster at St Michael's College, Tenbury (1966–1973), after which he was a lecturer for the Open University (1975–1976) and the University of Birmingham (1978–1980). In 1982 he studied piano in Paris with Magda Tagliaferro.

After research into the songs of Claude Debussy, Nichols's first book, published by the Oxford University Press (OUP) was a study of that composer (1972), an 86-page work, part of the OUP's "Oxford Studies of Composers" series. Later books include studies of Messiaen (1974) and Ravel (1977), and as editor or translator or both, collections of letters and reminiscences by and about Debussy (1987), Ravel (1987 and 2011), Berlioz (1995), Satie (1995) and Mendelssohn (1997). Among his most substantial translations are the English versions of Jean-Michel Nectoux's Gabriel Fauré: les voix du clair-obscur (1990), published by the Cambridge University Press as Gabriel Fauré: A Musical Life (1991), and Harry Halbreich's Arthur Honegger (1992), published by the Amadeus Press under the same title (1999). (Note: The volumes run, respectively, to 646 and 677 pages.)

In 2002 Nichols produced The Harlequin Years: Music in Paris 1917–1929. The Musical Times said of it, "The Harlequin Years is a marvellous book, and it deserves to be read by the widest possible audience. ... A classic." This volume grew out of a 12-part series of the same name for BBC Radio 3. From 1980 to 1992 Nichols also presented the Radio 3 drive time programme Mainly for Pleasure, now called In Tune. (Note: The BBC maintains an archive of the 297 programme listings.) Among his other broadcasts on Radio 3 was a five-part series on the life and art of Emmanuel Chabrier, with Clive Swift speaking the composer's words.

For the 1980 Grove Dictionary of Music and Musicians, Nichols wrote the articles on Debussy and Poulenc. He has contributed regularly to The Musical Times and the BBC Music Magazine.

In 2006 the French government appointed Nichols a Chevalier of the Legion of Honour for his forty years of service to French music. (Note: His sponsors were Madeleine Milhaud, Henri Dutilleux and Pierre Boulez.)

== Works ==
=== Books by Nichols ===
- From Berlioz to Boulez. Kahn & Averill. 2022. ISBN 9780995757479.
- Poulenc, a Biography. Yale University Press. 2020. ISBN 9780300226508.
- Ravel. Yale University Press. 2010. ISBN 9780300108828.
- The Harlequin Years: Music in Paris 1917–1929. Thames & Hudson. 2002. ISBN 9780500510957.
- The Life of Debussy. Cambridge University Press. 1998. ISBN 9780521570268.
- Mendelssohn Remembered. Faber. 1997. ISBN 9780571178605.
- Conversations with Madeleine Milhaud. Faber. 1996. ISBN 9780571160556.
- Debussy Remembered. Faber. 1992. ISBN 9780571153589.
- Pelléas et Mélisande, Cambridge Opera Handbook (with Richard Langham Smith). Cambridge University Press. 1989. ISBN 9780521307147.
- Ravel Remembered. Faber. 1987. ISBN 9780571149605.
- Greek Everyday Life, (with Sarah Nichols). Longman. 1978. ISBN 9780582206724.
- Ravel, Dent. Master Musicians. 1977. ISBN 9780460031462.
- Through Roman Eyes, (with Kenneth McLeish). Cambridge University Press. 1976. ISBN 9780521203456.
- Messiaen, Oxford Studies of Composers. Oxford University Press. 1975–1986. ISBN 9780193154285.
- Through Greek Eyes, (with Kenneth McLeish). Cambridge University Press. 1974. ISBN 9780521085601.
- Debussy, Oxford Studies of Composers. Oxford University Press. 1972–1975. ISBN 9780193154261.

=== Translations ===
- Southon, Nicolas (2014) [2011]. Francis Poulenc: Articles and Interviews – Notes from the Heart [J'écris ce qui me chante] (abridged translation). Ashgate. ISBN 9781409466222.
- Saint-Saëns, Camille (2008). Camille Saint-Saëns on Music and Musicians. Oxford University Press. ISBN 9780195320169.
- Henri Dutilleux: Music – Mystery and Memory [Mystère et mémoire des sons, entretiens avec Claude Glayman]. Ashgate. 2003 [1997, Actes Sud]. ISBN 9780754608998.
- Halbreich, Harry (1999) [1992, Fayard]. Arthur Honegger [Arthur Honegger: Un musicien dans la cité des hommes]. Amadeus Press. ISBN 9781574670417.
- Berlioz, Hector (1995). Macdonald, Hugh (ed.). Selected Letters of Berlioz. Faber. ISBN 9780393040623.
- Orledge, Robert (1995). Satie Remembered. Faber. ISBN 9780571172719.
- Nectoux, Jean-Michel (1991) [1990, Flammarion]. Gabriel Fauré: A Musical Life [Gabriel Fauré: les voix du clair-obscur]. Cambridge University Press. ISBN 9780521235242.
- Lesure, François; Nichols, Roger, eds. (1987) [1980, edited by François Lesure, Hermann]. Debussy Letters [Claude Debussy: Lettres 1884-1918] (abridged translation). Faber. ISBN 9780571147205.
- Livy (1982). Livy: Stories of Rome. Cambridge University Press. ISBN 9780521228169.

=== Editions ===
- Burton, Richard D. E. (2016). Nichols, Roger (ed.). Olivier Messiaen: Texts, Contexts, & Intertexts. Oxford University Press. ISBN 9780190277949. Left unfinished after Burton's death.

=== Contributions to symposia ===
- "La sexualité de Maurice Ravel", in Cahiers Maurice Ravel no 16, 2013–2014
- "Ravel and the twentieth century", in The Cambridge Companion to Ravel, edited by Deborah Mawer, Cambridge, 2000
- "The reception of Debussy's music in Britain up to 1914", in Debussy Studies, edited by Richard Langham Smith, Cambridge University Press, 1997
- "Claude Debussy", "Francis Poulenc", in The New Grove Twentieth-Century Masters, Macmillan, 1980

=== BBC Radio 3 documentaries ===
- "A Flower in the Jungle" (Maggie Teyte) 1988
- "A Winning Hand" (Benno Moiseiwitsch) 1990
- "Arthur Honegger, a portrait" 1992

=== Music scores edited ===
For Edition Peters, London:

- The Art of French Song, 2 vols, each both high and medium low, ISMN: 9790577081618

== Notes, references and sources ==
=== Sources ===
- Halbreich, Harry (1999) [1992]. Arthur Honegger. Translated by Roger Nichols. Portland, Oregon: Amadeus Press. ISBN 978-1-57467-041-7.
- Nectoux, Jean-Michel (1991) [1990]. Gabriel Fauré: A Musical Life. Translated by Roger Nichols. Cambridge: Cambridge University Press. ISBN 978-0-521-23524-2.
- Nichols, Roger (2002). The Harlequin Years: Music in Paris 1917–1929. Berkeley and Los Angeles: University of California Press. ISBN 978-0-520-23736-0.
