= Robert Orledge =

English musicologist (born 1948)

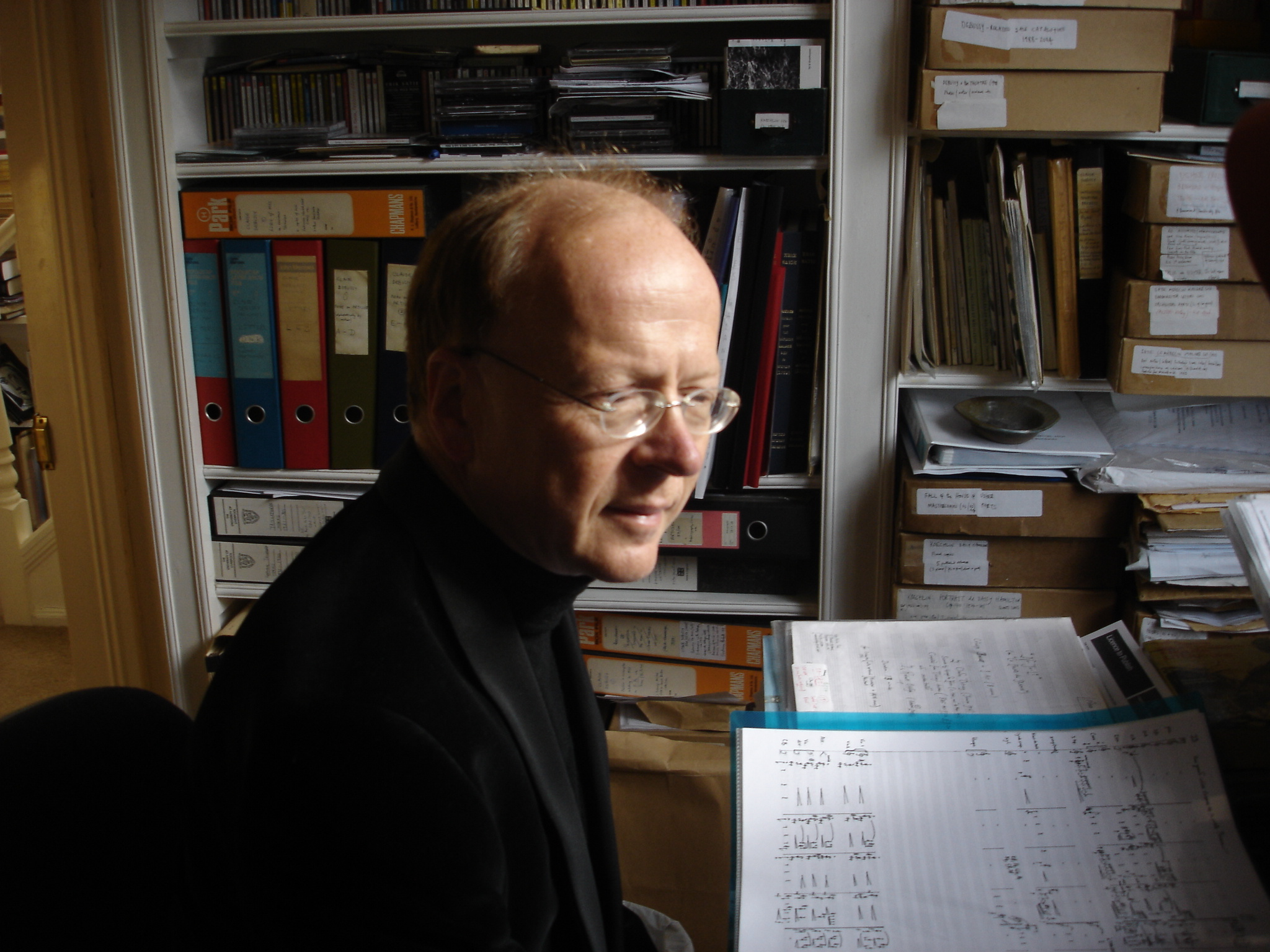
- Robert Orledge, 2006
- Born: 5 January 1948; Bath, Somerset, UK

Academic background
- Education: Clare College, Cambridge (B.A., M.A., PhD)

Academic work
- Discipline: French classical music
- Institutions: University of Liverpool

Robert Orledge (born 5 January 1948) is a British musicologist who specialises in French music from the late 19th to early 20th centuries. A Professor Emeritus at the University of Liverpool, Orledge has published book-length studies on the composers Claude Debussy, Gabriel Fauré, Charles Koechlin and Erik Satie.

== Life and career ==
Robert Orledge was born on 5 January 1948 in Bath, Somerset. After attending City of Bath Boys' School, he received a Bachelor of Arts (1968) and Master of Arts (1972) from Clare College, Cambridge. He received a PhD thesis from there with a study on Charles Koechlin, A Study of the Composer Charles Koechlin (1867–1950). Orledge became a professor of music at the University of Liverpool in 1991, having previously been a lecturer and senior lecturer there.

Orledge specialises in French music from the late 19th to early 20th centuries, particularly that of Claude Debussy, Gabriel Fauré, Charles Koechlin, Erik Satie and Germaine Tailleferre. He has written numerous articles and books on these figures, with a historical musicological-based approach.

== Selected publications ==
Books

- Orledge, Robert (1979). Gabriel Fauré. London: Eulenburg Books. ISBN 0-903873-40-0.
- Orledge, Robert (1982). Debussy and the theatre. Cambridge: Cambridge University Press. ISBN 978-0-521-22807-7.
- —— (1989). Charles Koechlin (1867–1950): His Life and Works. London: Psychology Press.
- —— (1990). Satie the Composer. Cambridge: Cambridge University Press. ISBN 978-0-521-35037-2.

Articles and chapters

- Orledge, Robert (2001). "Tailleferre, Germaine". Grove Music Online. Oxford: Oxford University Press. doi:10.1093/gmo/9781561592630.article.27390. (subscription, Wikilibrary access, or UK public library membership required)
- Fauser, Annegret; Orledge, Robert (2002) [2001]. "Boulanger, (Marie–Juliette Olga) Lili". Grove Music Online. Oxford: Oxford University Press. doi:10.1093/gmo/9781561592630.article.03704. (subscription, Wikilibrary access, or UK public library membership required)
- —— (2003). "Debussy the Man". In Trezise, Simon (ed.). The Cambridge Companion to Debussy. Cambridge: Cambridge University Press. ISBN 978-0-521-65478-4.
