= Jean-Michel Nectoux =

French musicologist

Jean-Michel Nectoux (born 20 November 1946) is a French musicologist, particularly noted as an expert on the life and music of Gabriel Fauré. He has published many books on Fauré and other French composers, and has been responsible for major exhibitions in Paris.

== Life and career ==
Nectoux was born in Le Raincy, a suburb of Paris. From 1964 to 1968 he studied law at the University of Paris, and at the Sorbonne, from 1968 to 1970, he studied musicology with Yves Gérard and musical aesthetics with Vladimir Jankélévitch. His doctoral thesis was on Gabriel Fauré and the theatre. After completing a course in librarianship at the Ecole nationale supérieure des Bibliothèques (1969–70), he was appointed chief librarian of the Bibliothéque municipale de Versailles (1970–72), and went on to head the music department of the Bibliothèque nationale de France (1972–85), where he oversaw major exhibitions about Ravel, Fauré, the Ballets Russes, Stravinsky, and Mahler.

Nectoux joined the Musée d'Orsay on its establishment in 1985, as chief curator of musical activities, concerts and interdisciplinary exhibitions, remaining there until 1997. He was then appointed deputy music director of Radio France, where he organised a series of concerts in 2000 presenting the complete works of Debussy. He was appointed "conseiller scientifique" of the new Institut national d'histoire de l'art. In 2009, he joined l’Institut de recherches sur le patrimoine musical en France.

Alongside his official appointments, Nectoux was secretary of the Répertoire international de littérature musicale (RILM) from 1972 to 1985, and assistant editor of the Revue de musicologie (1979–82). In 1980 he founded the musicological series Harmoniques, which included the publication of the complete correspondence of Mozart.

Nectoux's specialist areas of research focus on French music, literature and the arts in the years from 1850 to 1925; his studies have included Proust, Mallarmé, Fauré, Debussy, Ravel, the Ballets Russes and Stravinsky. The Grove Dictionary of Music and Musicians rates Nectoux as "the foremost authority on Fauré".
