= Henri Letocart =

French composer and organist

Victor Jean Félix Henri Letocart (6 February 1866 – 1945) was a French organist and composer.

== Biography ==
Born in Courbevoie, Henri Letocart was the son of a music teacher, Joseph Félix Letocart. He began his musical studies in 1879 at the École Niedermeyer, with Clément Loret and Eugène Gigout for the organ, before entering the Conservatoire de Paris in 1885 in the organ classes of César Franck and music composition of Ernest Guiraud. After the Conservatory, where he obtained a second degree in organ in 1887, he was first called to the position of organist of the church of St. Vincent de Paul. In 1900, he was appointed organist of the new instrument by Charles Mutin at Saint-Pierre de Neuilly until 1920, and maître de chapelle, a position he held until 1933.

Letocart was one of the most militant supporters of the restoration of liturgical chant.

The organist and composer André Fleury was one of his students, as was the composer Claude Duboscq.

== Works ==
- La Lyre Catholique, 3 volumes of pieces for harmonium (entries, offerings, elevations, communions, exits, verses) specially written for the religious service
- Pieces for organ
- Motets
- Mélodies
- Symphonic poems

== Bibliography ==
- Biographical notes in Maîtres contemporains de l'orgue, volume 2, 1911
