= École Niedermeyer de Paris =

Private music school in Paris (1817– 1920s)

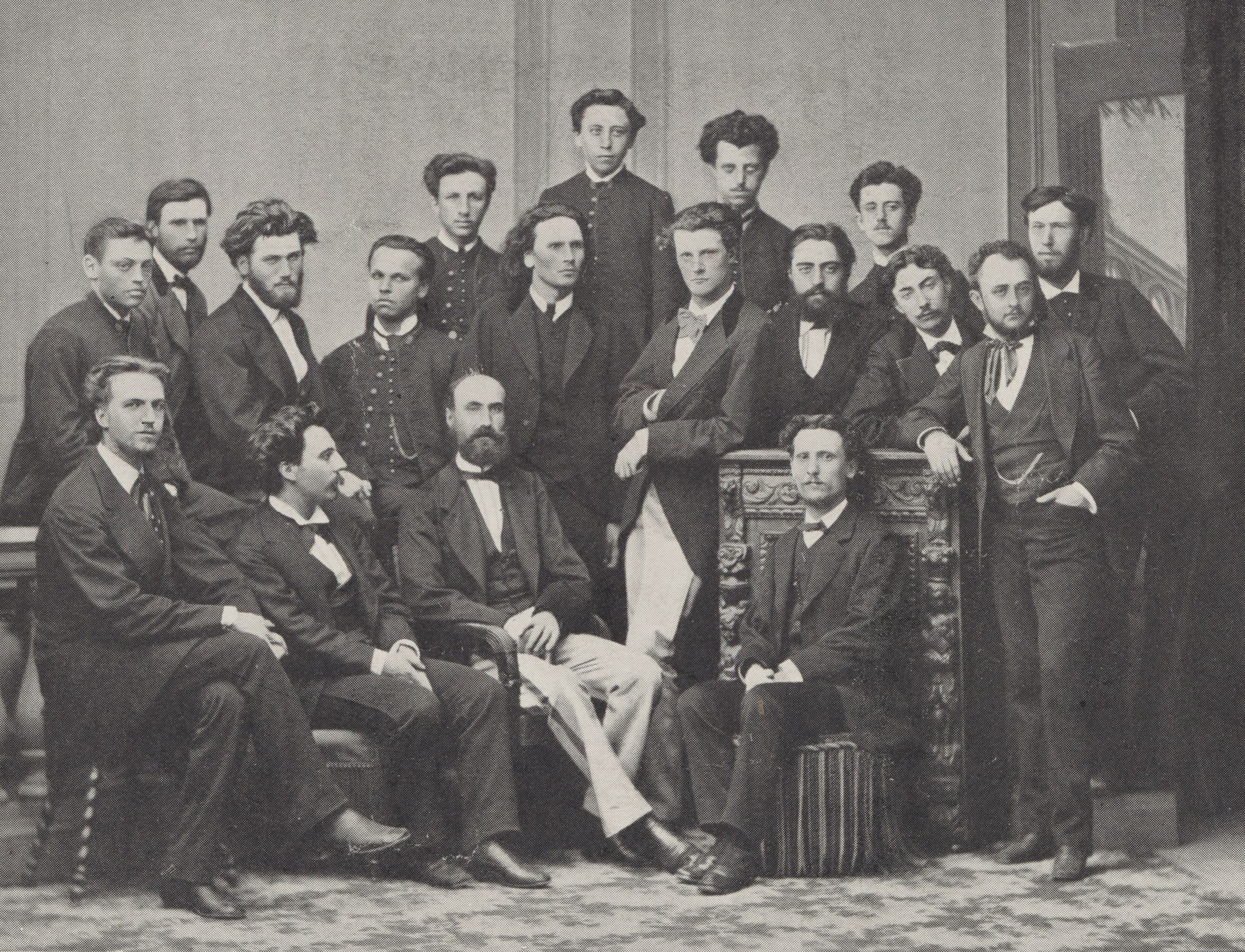
Teachers and students of the École Niedermeyer, 1871, including (front row, 2nd 3rd and 4th from left of picture) Gabriel Fauré, Gustave Lefèvre, Eugène Gigout, and (standing, middle row, 2nd from right) André Messager

The École Niedermeyer (English: Niedermeyer School) was a Paris school for church music, founded in 1853 by Louis Niedermeyer as successor to the Institution royale de musique classique et religieuse, which had been established and run by Alexandre Choron between 1817 and 1834.

== Background ==
Although a protestant from Switzerland, Louis Niedermeyer valued the French heritage of Roman Catholic Church music. Jean-Michel Nectoux, biographer of Gabriel Fauré – one of the school's first students – writes, "the name Niedermeyer is indissolubly linked with the renaissance of religious music in France". Few church choirs survived intact after the French Revolution and efforts to rebuild them were hampered by lack of resources. Alexandre Choron founded the Royal School of Religious Music in 1817, but it was disbanded at his death in 1834.

In 1840 Niedermeyer, up to then known chiefly as a composer, founded a Society of Vocal and Religious Music. The society performed sixteenth- and seventeenth-century works, and beginning in 1843 these were published in an eleven-volume anthology.

== Foundation ==
Niedermeyer had ambitions to open a music school to follow Choron's lead and in 1853 the newly-installed French Emperor, Napoleon III, agreed to be the patron of a small boarding school established by Niedermeyer in premises he had rented in the rue Neuve-Fontaine-Saint-Georges (now the rue Fromentin) in the 9th arrondissement of Paris. He favoured a boarding school because it insulated the pupils from distractions, eliminated time-wasting travel, had the teaching staff on hand to help pupils, and made it easier for the students to communicate with each other.

Apart from the compositional subjects – solfege, harmony and counterpoint – the emphasis was on instrumental performance: organ and piano, taught by Xavier Wackenthaler, Clément Loret and Niedermeyer himself. The school was notable for its attention to choral singing. Three times a week all the students assembled to sing under Pierre-Louis Dietsch, the school's harmony teacher as well as choirmaster at the Madeleine and conductor at the Opéra. Their repertoire was old church music including that of Josquin des Prez, Giovanni Pierluigi da Palestrina, J. S. Bach and Tomás Luis de Victoria, usually unaccompanied.

The Archbishop of Paris, Marie-Dominique-Auguste Sibour, after a certain hesitation because Niedermeyer was a protestant, gave the school his backing, and the pupils often performed at the church of Saint-Louis-d'Antin, whose clergy gave them instruction in religion and the classics. The Archbishop's backing led the Minister of Public Education, Hippolyte Fortoul, and the Prince de la Moskowa, aide de camp to the Emperor, to ensure that state funds were available to the school. One of the school's first students, Gabriel Fauré, recalled in old age that the school had provided "some sort of general education" in addition to its musical curriculum.

An unusual feature of the school was that pupils taught each other: the more senior students helped the masters in solfege and piano courses, gaining experience in instruction that would be useful in the careers as choirmasters for which many of them were destined. The most outstanding students were eligible for appointment to the faculty once they had completed their studies, as happened to Fauré's contemporary and friend Eugene Gigout.

== After Niedermeyer ==
Niedermeyer died suddenly in 1861, and was temporarily replaced by Dietsch, whom Nectoux describes as "the most despised of all the teachers". Camille Saint-Saëns took over the senior piano class and in Nectoux's words "turned his class into a veritable musical seminar devoted to tackling those 'modern' composers who did not find a place in the school's official list of studies: Liszt, Schumann and Wagner". Dietsch was replaced in 1865 by Gustave Lefèvre, Niedermeyer's son-in-law. At the time of the Paris Commune uprising (1871) and the ensuing violence in the city the school was temporarily evacuated to Switzerland.

The music scholar Roger Nichols writes that apart from Fauré, the school had – for a religiously inclined foundation – "a strange tendency ... to produce composers of stage music of the lighter kind", among them Edmond Audran, Edmond Missa, Alexandre Georges, Claude Terrasse and Andre Messager. Alumni who followed the founder's intentions more closely included Henri Büsser and the organists Leon Boellmann, Albert Périlhou and Eugène Gigout.

Lefèvre was succeeded as director by his son-in-law, Henri Heurtel, and the school continued until the 1920s.

== Sources ==
- Galerne, Maurice (1928). L'école Niedermeyer: sa création, son bur, son développement (in French). Paris: Éditions Margueritat. OCLC 19709969.
- Jones, J. Barrie (1988). Gabriel Fauré – A Life in Letters. London: Batsford. ISBN 978-0-7134-5468-0.
- Nectoux, Jean-Michel (1991). Gabriel Fauré: A Musical Life. Cambridge: Cambridge University Press. ISBN 0-521-23524-3.
- Nichols, Roger (2002). The Harlequin Years: Music in Paris, 1917–1929. Berkeley: University of California Press. ISBN 978-0-52-023736-0.
