= Gabriel Fauré =

French composer, organist, pianist and teacher (1845–1924)

Fauré in 1907

Gabriel Urbain Fauré (Note: English: UK: /ˈfɔːreɪ, ˈfɒreɪ/ FOR(R)-ay, US: /foʊˈreɪ, fɔːˈreɪ/ foh-RAY, for-AY; French: [ɡabʁijɛl yʁbɛ̃ foʁe].) (12 May (Note: Some early sources including Copland say that Fauré was born on 13 May; the birth register for that date reads "born yesterday" and authorities including Nectoux, Jones and Duchen give 12 May as the date of birth.) 1845 – 4 November 1924) was a French composer, organist, pianist and teacher. He was one of the foremost French composers of his generation, and his musical style influenced many 20th-century composers. Among his best-known works are his Pavane, Requiem, Sicilienne, nocturnes for piano and the songs "Après un rêve" and "Clair de lune". Although his best-known and most accessible compositions are generally his earlier ones, Fauré composed many of his most highly regarded works in his later years, in a more harmonically and melodically complex style.

Fauré was born into a cultured but not especially musical family. His talent became clear when he was a young boy. At the age of nine, he was sent to the École Niedermeyer music college in Paris, where he was trained to be a church organist and choirmaster. Among his teachers was Camille Saint-Saëns, who became a lifelong friend. After graduating from the college in 1865, Fauré earned a modest living as an organist and teacher, leaving him little time for composition. When he became successful in his middle age, holding the important posts of organist of the Église de la Madeleine and director of the Paris Conservatoire, he still lacked time for composing; he retreated to the countryside in the summer holidays to concentrate on composition. By his last years, he was recognised in France as the leading French composer of his day. An unprecedented national musical tribute was held for him in Paris in 1922, headed by the president of the French Republic. Outside France, Fauré's music took decades to become widely accepted, except in Britain, where he had many admirers during his lifetime.

Fauré's music has been described as linking the end of Romanticism with the modernism of the second quarter of the 20th century. When he was born, Chopin was still composing, and by the time of Fauré's death, jazz and the atonal music of the Second Viennese School were being heard. The Grove Dictionary of Music and Musicians, which describes him as the most advanced composer of his generation in France, notes that his harmonic and melodic innovations influenced the teaching of harmony for later generations. During the last twenty years of his life, he suffered from increasing deafness. In contrast with the charm of his earlier music, his works from this period are sometimes elusive and withdrawn in character, and at other times turbulent and impassioned.

== Biography ==
=== Early years ===
Fauré was born in Pamiers, Ariège, in the south of France, the fifth son and youngest of six children of Toussaint-Honoré Fauré and Marie-Antoinette-Hélène Lalène-Laprade. According to the biographer Jean-Michel Nectoux, the Fauré family dates to the 13th century in that part of France. The family had at one time been substantial landowners, but by the 19th century its means had become reduced. The composer's paternal grandfather, Gabriel, was a butcher whose son became a schoolmaster. In 1829 Fauré's parents married. His mother was the daughter of a minor member of the nobility. He was the only one of the six children to display musical talent; his four brothers pursued careers in journalism, politics, the army and the civil service, and his sister had a traditional life as the wife of a public servant.

The young Fauré was sent to live with a foster mother until he was four years old. When his father was appointed director of the École Normale d'Instituteurs, a teacher training college, at Montgauzy, near Foix, in 1849, Fauré returned to live with his family. There was a chapel attached to the school, which Fauré recalled in the last year of his life:

I grew up, a rather quiet well-behaved child, in an area of great beauty. ... But the only thing I remember really clearly is the harmonium in that little chapel. Every time I could get away I ran there – and I regaled myself. ... I played atrociously ... no method at all, quite without technique, but I do remember that I was happy; and if that is what it means to have a vocation, then it is a very pleasant thing.

Fauré as a student, 1864

An old blind woman, who came to listen and give the boy advice, told his father of Fauré's gift for music. In 1853 Simon-Lucien Dufaur de Saubiac, of the National Assembly, (Note: Sources differ on Dufaur de Saubiac's position at the Assembly. Jones identifies him as "the parliamentary deputy for the département, as does Johnson; Orledge similarly identifies him as "the member of the Assembly for Ariège"; Nectoux describes him as "a senior civil servant in the Chamber of Deputies (or Palais législatif as it was known in the Second Empire)"; Duchen does not mention the Assembly, referring to Dufaur de Saubiac as "a local man who worked as an archivist in Paris".) heard Fauré play and advised Toussaint-Honoré to send him to the École Niedermeyer de Paris, which Louis Niedermeyer was setting up in Paris. After reflecting for a year, Fauré's father agreed and took the nine-year-old boy to Paris in October 1854.

Helped by a scholarship from the bishop of his home diocese, Fauré boarded at the school for 11 years. The régime was austere, the rooms gloomy, the food mediocre, and the required uniform elaborate. (Note: A later writer describes "a photo of Fauré as a boy wearing the school uniform and looking not unlike Arthur Sullivan as one of the children of the Chapel Royal".) The musical tuition, however, was excellent. Niedermeyer, whose goal was to produce qualified organists and choirmasters, focused on church music. Fauré's tutors were Clément Loret for organ, Louis Dietsch for harmony, Xavier Wackenthaler for counterpoint and fugue, and Niedermeyer for piano, plainsong and composition.

When Niedermeyer died in March 1861, Camille Saint-Saëns took charge of piano studies and introduced contemporary music, including that of Schumann, Liszt and Wagner. Fauré recalled in old age, "After allowing the lessons to run over, he would go to the piano and reveal to us those works of the masters from which the rigorous classical nature of our programme of study kept us at a distance and who, moreover, in those far-off years, were scarcely known. ... At the time I was 15 or 16, and from this time dates the almost filial attachment ... the immense admiration, the unceasing gratitude I [have] had for him, throughout my life."

Saint-Saëns took great pleasure in his pupil's progress, which he helped whenever he could; Nectoux comments that at each step in Fauré's career "Saint-Saëns's shadow can effectively be taken for granted." The close friendship between them lasted until Saint-Saëns died sixty years later.

Fauré won many prizes while at the school, including a premier prix in composition for the Cantique de Jean Racine, Op. 11, the earliest of his choral works to enter the regular repertory. He left the school in July 1865, as a Laureat in organ, piano, harmony and composition, with a Maître de chapelle diploma.

=== Organist and composer ===
On leaving the École Niedermeyer, Fauré was appointed organist at the Church of Saint-Sauveur, at Rennes in Brittany. He took up the post in January 1866. During his four years at Rennes he supplemented his income by taking private pupils, giving "countless piano lessons". At Saint-Saëns's regular prompting he continued to compose, but none of his works from this period survive. He was bored at Rennes and had an uneasy relationship with the parish priest, who correctly doubted Fauré's religious conviction. Fauré was regularly seen stealing out during the sermon for a cigarette, and in early 1870, when he turned up to play at Mass one Sunday still in his evening clothes, having been out all night at a ball, he was asked to resign. Almost immediately, with the discreet aid of Saint-Saëns, he secured the post of assistant organist at the church of Notre-Dame de Clignancourt, in the north of Paris. He remained there for only a few months. On the outbreak of the Franco-Prussian War in 1870 he volunteered for military service. He took part in the action to raise the siege of Paris, and saw action at Le Bourget, Champigny and Créteil. He was awarded a Croix de Guerre.

Staff and students of the École Niedermeyer, 1871. Fauré in front row second from left; André Messager in middle row second from right

After France's defeat by Prussia, there was a brief, bloody conflict within Paris from March to May 1871 during the Commune. Fauré escaped to Rambouillet where one of his brothers lived, and then travelled to Switzerland, where he took up a teaching post at the École Niedermeyer, which had temporarily relocated there to avoid the violence in Paris. His first pupil at the school was André Messager, who became a lifelong friend and occasional collaborator. Fauré's compositions from this period did not overtly reflect the turmoil and bloodshed. Some of his colleagues, including Saint-Saëns, Gounod and Franck, produced elegies and patriotic odes. Fauré did not, but according to his biographer Jessica Duchen, his music acquired "a new sombreness, a dark-hued sense of tragedy ... evident mainly in his songs of this period including L'Absent, Seule! and La Chanson du pêcheur."

When Fauré returned to Paris in October 1871, he was appointed choirmaster at the Église Saint-Sulpice under the composer and organist Charles-Marie Widor. In the course of his duties, he wrote several canticles and motets, few of which have survived. During some services, Widor and Fauré improvised simultaneously at the church's two organs, trying to catch each other out with sudden changes of key. Fauré regularly attended Saint-Saëns's musical salons and those of Pauline Viardot, to whom Saint-Saëns introduced him.

Fauré was a founding member of the Société Nationale de Musique, formed in February 1871 under the joint chairmanship of Romain Bussine and Saint-Saëns, to promote new French music. Other members included Georges Bizet, Emmanuel Chabrier, Vincent d'Indy, Henri Duparc, César Franck, Édouard Lalo and Jules Massenet. Fauré became secretary of the society in 1874. Many of his works were first presented at the society's concerts.

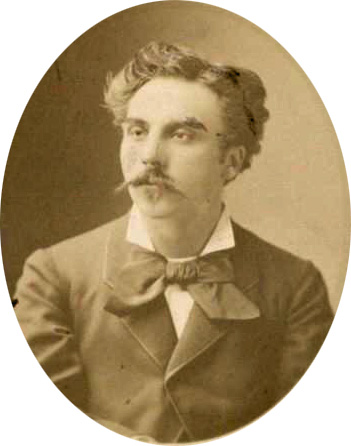
Fauré in 1875

In 1874 Fauré moved from Saint-Sulpice to the Église de la Madeleine, acting as deputy for the principal organist, Saint-Saëns, during the latter's many absences on tour. Some admirers of Fauré's music have expressed regret that although he played the organ professionally for four decades, he left no solo compositions for the instrument. He was renowned for his improvisations, and Saint-Saëns said of him that he was "a first class organist when he wanted to be". Fauré preferred the piano to the organ, which he played only because it gave him a regular income. Duchen speculates that he positively disliked the organ, possibly because "for a composer of such delicacy of nuance, and such sensuality, the organ was simply not subtle enough."

The year 1877 was significant for Fauré, both professionally and personally. In January his first violin sonata was performed at a Société Nationale concert with great success, marking a turning-point in his composing career at the age of 31. Nectoux counts the work as the composer's first great masterpiece. In March, Saint-Saëns retired from the Madeleine, succeeded as organist by Théodore Dubois, his choirmaster; Fauré was appointed to take over from Dubois. In July Fauré became engaged to Pauline Viardot's daughter Marianne, with whom he was deeply in love. To his great sorrow, she broke off the engagement in November 1877, for reasons that are not clear. To distract Fauré, Saint-Saëns took him to Weimar and introduced him to Franz Liszt. This visit gave Fauré a liking for foreign travel, which he indulged for the rest of his life. From 1878, he and Messager made trips abroad to see Wagner operas. They saw Das Rheingold and Die Walküre at the Cologne Opera; the complete Ring cycle at the Hofoper in Munich and at Her Majesty's Theatre in London; and Die Meistersinger in Munich and at Bayreuth, where they also saw Parsifal. They frequently performed as a party piece their joint composition, the irreverent Souvenirs de Bayreuth. This short, up-tempo piano work for four hands sends up themes from The Ring. Fauré admired Wagner and had a detailed knowledge of his music, but he was one of the few composers of his generation not to come under Wagner's musical influence. (Note: Fauré liked some of Wagner's operas more than others. He loved Die Meistersinger, Parsifal and the Ring, was lukewarm about Tannhäuser and Lohengrin and detested Tristan und Isolde. Duchen speculates that "the excess – in sentiment and length" of the last was fundamentally contrary to Fauré's aesthetic sensibilities.)

=== Middle years ===
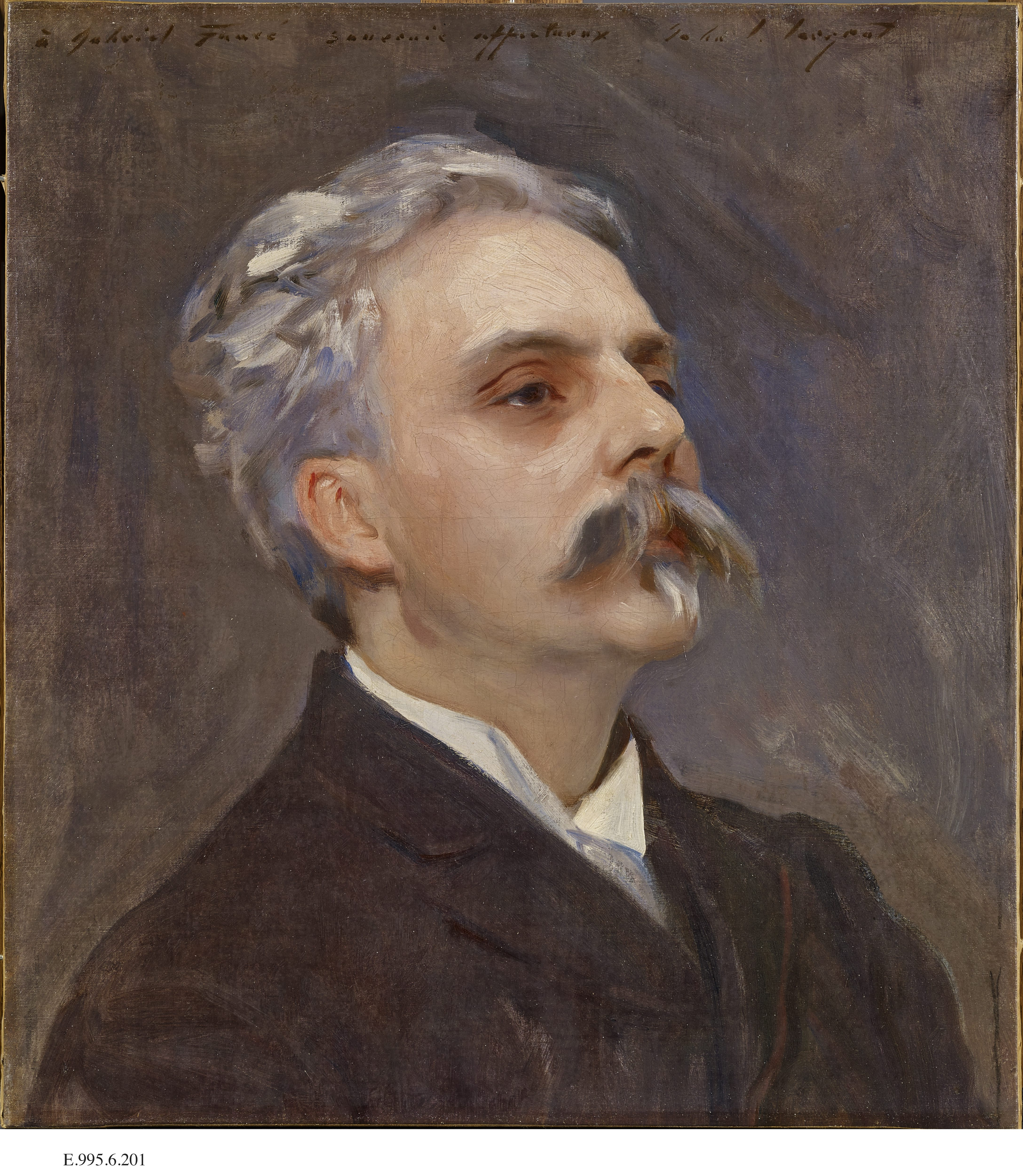
Fauré by John Singer Sargent, 1889

In 1883 Fauré married Marie Fremiet, the daughter of a leading sculptor, Emmanuel Fremiet. (Note: Some sources put an acute accent on the first 'e' of the surname, but Marie Fremiet's letters show that she did not do so. The spelling without the accent is followed by Nectoux, Jones and Duchen.) Nectoux comments that Marie was "without beauty, wit or a fortune ... narrow and cold", but records that "in spite of everything [Fauré] still felt a tenderness towards her". The marriage was affectionate, but Marie was, in Nectoux's phrase, "a stay-at-home", and she did not share her husband's wish to go out in the evenings, and became resentful of his frequent absences, his dislike of domestic life – "horreur du domicile" – and his love affairs, while she remained at home. Though Fauré valued Marie as a friend and confidante, writing to her often – sometimes daily – when away from home, she did not share his passionate nature, which found fulfilment elsewhere. Fauré and his wife had two sons. The first, born in 1883, Emmanuel Fauré-Fremiet (Marie insisted on combining her family name with Fauré's), became a biologist of international reputation. The second son, Philippe, born in 1889, became a writer; his works included histories, plays, and biographies of his father and grandfather.

Contemporary accounts agree that Fauré was extremely attractive to women; (Note: Alfredo Casella, one of his pupils, wrote that Fauré had "the large, languid and sensual eyes of an impenitent Casanova". It was rumoured in Parisian musical circles that some of Fauré's most talented pupils may have been his illegitimate children. The rumours were never substantiated.) in Duchen's phrase, "his conquests were legion in the Paris salons." After a romantic attachment to the singer Emma Bardac from around 1892, followed by another to the composer Adela Maddison, in 1900 Fauré met the pianist Marguerite Hasselmans, the daughter of Alphonse Hasselmans. This led to a relationship which lasted for the rest of Fauré's life. He maintained her in a Paris apartment, and she acted openly as his companion.

Fauré and Marie in 1889

To support his family, Fauré spent most of his time in running the daily services at the Madeleine and giving piano and harmony lessons. His compositions earned him a negligible amount, because his publisher bought them outright, paying him an average of 60 francs for a song, and Fauré received no royalties. During this period, he wrote several large-scale works, in addition to many piano pieces and songs, but he destroyed most of them after a few performances, only retaining a few movements in order to re-use motifs. Among the works surviving from this period is the Requiem, begun in 1887 and revised and expanded, over the years, until its final version dating from 1901. After its first performance, in 1888, the priest in charge told the composer, "We don't need these novelties: the Madeleine's repertoire is quite rich enough."

As a young man Fauré had been very cheerful; a friend wrote of his "youthful, even somewhat child-like, mirth." From his thirties he suffered bouts of depression, which he described as "spleen", possibly first caused by his broken engagement and his lack of success as a composer. In 1890 a prestigious and remunerative commission to write an opera with lyrics by Paul Verlaine was aborted by the poet's drunken inability to deliver a libretto. Fauré was plunged into so deep a depression that his friends were seriously concerned about his health. Winnaretta de Scey-Montbéliard, (Note: Better known by her original name Winnaretta Singer and her later title the Princesse de Polignac.) always a good friend to Fauré, invited him to Venice, where she had a palazzo on the Grand Canal. He recovered his spirits and began to compose again, writing the first of his five Mélodies de Venise, to words by Verlaine, whose poetry he continued to admire despite the operatic debacle.

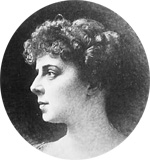
Emma Bardac

About this time, or shortly afterwards, Fauré's liaison with Emma Bardac began; in Duchen's words, "for the first time, in his late forties, he experienced a fulfilling, passionate relationship which extended over several years". His principal biographers all agree that this affair inspired a burst of creativity and a new originality in his music, exemplified in the song cycle La bonne chanson. Fauré wrote the Dolly Suite for piano duet between 1894 and 1897 and dedicated it to Bardac's daughter Hélène, known as "Dolly". (Note: In the UK, the first piece, "Berceuse", from the Dolly Suite became Fauré's best-known piece to several generations of children; it was used as the closing music for the BBC Home Service radio programme Listen with Mother, which was broadcast from 1950 to 1982.) Some people suspected that Fauré was Dolly's father, but biographers including Nectoux and Duchen think it unlikely. Fauré's affair with Emma Bardac is thought to have begun after Dolly was born, though there is no conclusive evidence either way.

During the 1890s Fauré's fortunes improved. When Ernest Guiraud, professor of composition at the Paris Conservatoire, died in 1892, Saint-Saëns encouraged Fauré to apply for the vacant post. The faculty of the Conservatoire regarded Fauré as dangerously modern, and its head, Ambroise Thomas, blocked the appointment, declaring, "Fauré? Never! If he's appointed, I resign." However, Fauré was appointed to another of Guiraud's posts, inspector of the music conservatories in the French provinces. He disliked the prolonged travelling around the country that the work entailed, but the post gave him a steady income and enabled him to give up teaching amateur pupils.

Clockwise from top left: Saint-Saëns, Thomas, Massenet, Dubois

In 1896 Ambroise Thomas died, and Théodore Dubois took over as head of the Conservatoire. Fauré succeeded Dubois as chief organist of the Madeleine. Dubois' move had further repercussions: Massenet, professor of composition at the Conservatoire, had expected to succeed Thomas, but had overplayed his hand by insisting on being appointed for life. He was turned down, and when Dubois was appointed instead, Massenet resigned his professorship in fury. Fauré was appointed in his place. He taught many young composers, including Maurice Ravel, Florent Schmitt, Charles Koechlin, Louis Aubert, Jean Roger-Ducasse, George Enescu, Paul Ladmirault, Alfredo Casella and Nadia Boulanger. In Fauré's view, his students needed a firm grounding in the basic skills, which he was happy to delegate to his capable assistant André Gedalge. His own part came in helping them make use of these skills in the way that suited each student's talents. Roger-Ducasse later wrote, "Taking up whatever the pupils were working on, he would evoke the rules of the form at hand ... and refer to examples, always drawn from the masters." Ravel always remembered Fauré's open-mindedness as a teacher. Having received Ravel's String Quartet with less than his usual enthusiasm, Fauré asked to see the manuscript again a few days later, saying, "I could have been wrong". The musicologist Henry Prunières wrote, "What Fauré developed among his pupils was taste, harmonic sensibility, the love of pure lines, of unexpected and colorful modulations; but he never gave them [recipes] for composing according to his style and that is why they all sought and found their own paths in many different, and often opposed, directions."

Fauré's works of the last years of the century include incidental music for the English premiere of Maurice Maeterlinck's Pelléas et Mélisande (1898) and Prométhée, a lyric tragedy composed for the amphitheatre at Béziers. Written for outdoor performance, the work is scored for huge instrumental and vocal forces. Its premiere in August 1900 was a great success, and it was revived at Béziers the following year and in Paris in 1907. A version with orchestration for normal opera house-sized forces was given at the Paris Opéra in May 1917 and received more than forty performances in Paris thereafter. (Note: The 1907 Paris premiere was staged at the Hippodrome, but the acoustics were so bad that the second performance was moved to the Opéra. The 1917 revised orchestration was made by Roger-Ducasse, at Fauré's request.)

From 1903 to 1921, Fauré regularly wrote music criticism for Le Figaro, a role in which he was not at ease. Nectoux writes that Fauré's natural kindness and broad-mindedness predisposed him to emphasise the positive aspects of a work.

=== Head of Paris Conservatoire ===
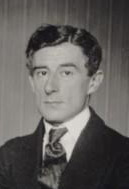
Maurice Ravel

In 1905 a scandal erupted in French musical circles over the country's top musical prize, the Prix de Rome. Fauré's pupil Ravel had been eliminated prematurely in his sixth attempt for this award, and many believed that reactionary elements within the Conservatoire had played a part in it. Dubois, who became the subject of much censure, brought forward his retirement and stepped down at once. Appointed in his place, and with the support of the French government, Fauré radically changed the administration and curriculum. He appointed independent external judges to decide on admissions, examinations and competitions, a move which enraged faculty members who had given preferential treatment to their private pupils; feeling themselves deprived of a considerable extra income, many of them resigned. Fauré was dubbed "Robespierre" by disaffected members of the old guard as he modernised and broadened the range of music taught at the Conservatoire. As Nectoux puts it, "where Auber, Halévy and especially Meyerbeer had reigned supreme ... it was now possible to sing an aria by Rameau or even some Wagner – up to now a forbidden name within the Conservatoire's walls". The curriculum was broadened to range from Renaissance polyphony to the works of Debussy.

Fauré's new position left him better off financially. However, while he also became much more widely known as a composer, running the Conservatoire left him with no more time for composition than when he was struggling to earn a living as an organist and piano teacher. As soon as the working year was over, in the last days of July, he would leave Paris and spend the two months until early October in a hotel, usually by one of the Swiss lakes, to concentrate on composition. His works from this period include his lyric opera, Pénélope (1913), and some of his most characteristic later songs (e.g., the cycle La chanson d'Ève, Op. 95, completed in 1910) and piano pieces (Nocturnes Nos. 9–11; Barcarolles Nos. 7–11, written between 1906 and 1914).

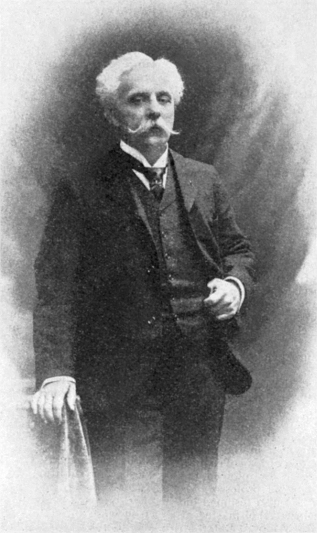
Fauré at the turn of the century

Fauré was elected to the Institut de France in 1909, after his father-in-law and Saint-Saëns, both long-established members, had canvassed strongly on his behalf. He won the ballot by a narrow margin, with 18 votes against 16 for the other candidate, Widor. (Note: Widor was elected the following year.) In the same year a group of young composers led by Ravel and Koechlin broke with the Société Nationale de Musique, which under the presidency of Vincent d'Indy had become a reactionary organisation, and formed a new group, the Société musicale indépendante. While Fauré accepted the presidency of this society, he also remained a member of the older one and continued on the best of terms with d'Indy; his sole concern was the fostering of new music. In 1911 he oversaw the Conservatoire's move to new premises in the rue de Madrid.

During this time, Fauré developed serious problems with his hearing. Not only did he start to go deaf, but sounds became distorted, so that high and low notes sounded painfully out of tune to him.

The turn of the 20th century saw a rise in the popularity of Fauré's music in Britain, and to a lesser extent in Germany, Spain and Russia. He visited England frequently, and an invitation to play at Buckingham Palace in 1908 opened many other doors in London and beyond. He was in London for the premiere of Elgar's First Symphony in 1908 and dined with the composer. Elgar later wrote to their mutual friend Frank Schuster that Fauré "was such a real gentleman – the highest kind of Frenchman and I admired him greatly." Elgar tried to get Fauré's Requiem put on at the Three Choirs Festival, but it did not finally have its English premiere until 1937, nearly fifty years after its first performance in France. Composers from other countries also loved and admired Fauré. In the 1880s Tchaikovsky had thought him "adorable"; Albéniz and Fauré were friends and correspondents until the former's early death in 1909; Richard Strauss sought his advice; and in Fauré's last years, the young American Aaron Copland was a devoted admirer.

The outbreak of the First World War almost stranded Fauré in Germany, where he had gone for his annual composing retreat. He managed to get from Germany into Switzerland, and thence to Paris. He remained in France for the duration of the war. When a group of French musicians led by Saint-Saëns tried to organise a boycott of German music, Fauré and Messager dissociated themselves from the idea, though the disagreement did not affect their friendship with Saint-Saëns. (Note: Fauré and Messager were privately concerned that their old friend was in danger of looking foolish with his excess of patriotism, and also his growing tendency to denounce the works of rising young composers, as in his condemnation of Debussy's En blanc et noir: "We must at all costs bar the door of the Institut against a man capable of such atrocities; they should be put next to the cubist pictures.") Fauré did not recognise nationalism in music, seeing in his art "a language belonging to a country so far above all others that it is dragged down when it has to express feelings or individual traits that belong to any particular nation." Nonetheless, he was aware that his own music was respected rather than loved in Germany. In January 1905, visiting Frankfurt and Cologne for concerts of his music, he had written, "The criticisms of my music have been that it's a bit cold and too well brought up! There's no question about it, French and German are two different things."

=== Last years and legacy ===
In 1920, at the age of 75, Fauré retired from the Conservatoire because of his increasing deafness and frailty. In that year he received the Grand-Croix of the Légion d'honneur, an honour rare for a musician. In 1922 the president of the republic, Alexandre Millerand, led a public tribute to Fauré, a national hommage, described in The Musical Times as "a splendid celebration at the Sorbonne, in which the most illustrious French artists participated, [which] brought him great joy. It was a poignant spectacle, indeed: that of a man present at a concert of his own works and able to hear not a single note. He sat gazing before him pensively, and, in spite of everything, grateful and content."

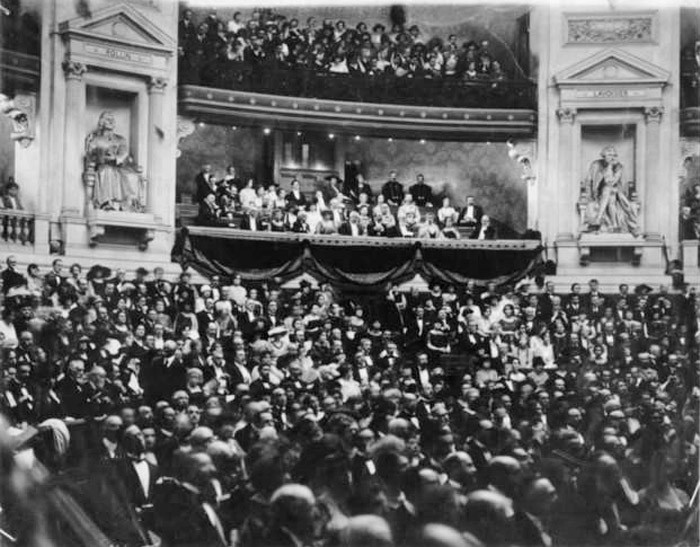
National hommage to Fauré, 1922. Fauré and President Millerand are in the box between the statues

Fauré suffered from poor health in his later years, brought on in part by heavy smoking. Despite this, he remained available to young composers, including members of Les Six, most of whom were devoted to him. (Note: Poulenc was the exception among Les Six in disliking Fauré's music. Nectoux comments that this seems strange because of all the members of Les Six, Poulenc "is the nearest to Fauré in the limpid clarity and singing quality of his own writing, in his charm".) Nectoux writes, "In old age he attained a kind of serenity, without losing any of his remarkable spiritual vitality, but rather removed from the sensualism and the passion of the works he wrote between 1875 and 1895."

In his last months, Fauré struggled to complete his String Quartet. Twenty years earlier he had been the dedicatee of Ravel's String Quartet. Ravel and others urged Fauré to compose one of his own. He refused for many years, on the grounds that it was too difficult. When he finally decided to write it, he did so in trepidation, telling his wife, "I've started a Quartet for strings, without piano. This is a genre which Beethoven in particular made famous, and causes all those who are not Beethoven to be terrified of it." He worked on the piece for a year, finishing it on 11 September 1924, less than two months before he died, working long hours towards the end to complete it. The quartet was premiered after his death; he declined an offer to have it performed privately for him in his last days, as his hearing had deteriorated to the point where musical sounds were horribly distorted in his ear.

Fauré died in Paris from pneumonia on 4 November 1924 at the age of 79. He was given a state funeral at the Église de la Madeleine and is buried in the Passy Cemetery in Paris.

After Fauré's death, the Conservatoire abandoned his radicalism and became resistant to new trends in music, with Fauré's own harmonic practice being held up as the farthest limit of modernity, beyond which students should not go. His successor, Henri Rabaud, director of the Conservatoire from 1922 to 1941, declared "modernism is the enemy". The generation of students born between the wars rejected this outdated premise, turning for inspiration to Bartók, the Second Viennese School, and the latest works of Stravinsky.

In a centenary tribute in 1945, the musicologist Leslie Orrey wrote in The Musical Times, "'More profound than Saint-Saëns, more varied than Lalo, more spontaneous than d'Indy, more classic than Debussy, Gabriel Fauré is the master par excellence of French music, the perfect mirror of our musical genius.' Perhaps, when English musicians get to know his work better, these words of Roger-Ducasse will seem, not over-praise, but no more than his due."

== Music ==
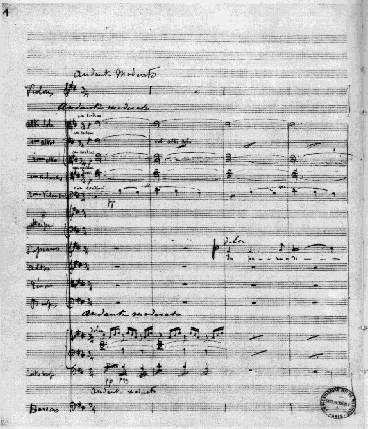
Manuscript page of the Requiem

Aaron Copland wrote that although Fauré's works can be divided into the usual "early", "middle" and "late" periods, there is no such radical difference between his first and last manners as is evident with many other composers. Copland found premonitions of late Fauré in even the earliest works, and traces of the early Fauré in the works of his old age: "The themes, harmonies, form, have remained essentially the same, but with each new work they have all become more fresh, more personal, more profound." When Fauré was born, Berlioz and Chopin were still composing; the latter was among Fauré's early influences. In his later years Fauré developed compositional techniques that foreshadowed the atonal music of Schoenberg, and, later still, drew discreetly on the techniques of jazz. Duchen writes that early works such as the Cantique de Jean Racine are in the tradition of French nineteenth-century romanticism, yet his late works are as modern as any of the works of his pupils.

Influences on Fauré, particularly in his early work, included not only Chopin but Mozart and Schumann. The authors of The Record Guide (1955), Sackville-West and Shawe-Taylor, wrote that Fauré learnt restraint and beauty of surface from Mozart, tonal freedom and long melodic lines from Chopin, "and from Schumann, the sudden felicities in which his development sections abound, and those codas in which whole movements are briefly but magically illuminated." His work was based on the strong understanding of harmonic structures that he gained at the École Niedermeyer from Niedermeyer's successor Gustave Lefèvre. Lefèvre wrote the book Traité d'harmonie (Paris, 1889), in which he sets out a harmonic theory that differs significantly from the classical theory of Rameau, no longer outlawing certain chords as "dissonant". (Note: In particular, seventh and ninth chords were no longer considered dissonant, and the mediant could be altered without changing the mode.) By using unresolved mild discords and colouristic effects, Fauré anticipated the techniques of Impressionist composers.

In contrast with his harmonic and melodic style, which pushed the bounds for his time, Fauré's rhythmic motives tended to be subtle and repetitive, with little to break the flow of the line, although he used discreet syncopations, similar to those found in Brahms's works. Copland referred to him as "the Brahms of France". The music critic Jerry Dubins suggests that Fauré "represents the link between the late German Romanticism of Brahms ... and the French Impressionism of Debussy."

To Sackville-West and Shawe-Taylor, Fauré's later works do not display the easy charm of his earlier music: "the luscious romantic harmony which had always been firmly supported by a single tonality, later gave way to a severely monochrome style, full of enharmonic shifts, and creating the impression of several tonal centres simultaneously employed."

=== Vocal music ===
Fauré is regarded as one of the masters of the French art song, or mélodie. Ravel wrote in 1922 that Fauré had saved French music from the dominance of the German Lied. Two years later the critic Samuel Langford wrote of Fauré, "More surely almost than any writer in the world he commanded the faculty to create a song all of a piece, and with a sustained intensity of mood which made it like a single thought". In a 2011 article the pianist and writer Roy Howat and the musicologist Emily Kilpatrick wrote:

His devotion to the mélodie spans his career, from the ever-fresh "Le papillon et la fleur" of 1861 to the masterly cycle L'horizon chimérique, composed sixty years and more than a hundred songs later. Fauré's songs are now core repertoire for students and professionals, sung in conservatories and recital halls throughout the world.

In Copland's view, the early songs, written in the 1860s and 1870s under the influence of Gounod, except for isolated songs such as "Après un rêve" or "Au bord de l'eau", show little sign of the artist to come. With the second volume of the sixty collected songs written during the next two decades, Copland judged, came the first mature examples of "the real Fauré". He instanced "Les berceaux", "Les roses d'Ispahan" and especially "Clair de lune" as "so beautiful, so perfect, that they have even penetrated to America", and drew attention to less well known mélodies such as "Le secret", "Nocturne", and "Les présents". Fauré also composed a number of song cycles. Cinq mélodies "de Venise", Op. 58 (1891), was described by Fauré as a novel kind of song suite, in its use of musical themes recurring over the cycle. For the later cycle La bonne chanson, Op. 61 (1894), there were five such themes, according to Fauré. He also wrote that La bonne chanson was his most spontaneous composition, with Emma Bardac singing back to him each day's newly written material. Among later works were cycles drawn from the poems of Charles van Lerberghe, La chanson d'Ève (1910) and Le jardin clos (1914).

Cantique de Jean Racine
A shorter choral work by Fauré

The Requiem, Op. 48, first performed in 1888, was not composed to the memory of a specific person but, in Fauré's words, "for the pleasure of it." It has been described as "a lullaby of death" because of its predominantly gentle tone. Fauré omitted the Dies irae, though reference to the day of judgment appears in the Libera me, which, like Verdi, he added to the normal liturgical text. Fauré revised the Requiem over the years, and a number of different performing versions are now in use, from the earliest, for small forces, to the final revision with full orchestra.

Fauré's operas have not found a place in the regular repertoire. Prométhée is the more neglected of the two, with only a handful of performances in more than a century. Copland considered Pénélope (1913) a fascinating work, and one of the best operas written since Wagner; he noted, however, that the music is, as a whole, "distinctly non-theatrical." The work uses leitmotifs, and the two main roles call for voices of heroic quality, but these are the only ways in which the work is Wagnerian. In Fauré's late style, "tonality is stretched hard, without breaking." On the rare occasions when the piece has been staged, critical opinion has generally praised the musical quality of the score, but has varied as to the dramatic effectiveness of the work. When the opera was first presented in London in 1970, in a student production by the Royal Academy of Music, Peter Heyworth wrote, "A score that offers rich rewards to an attentive ear can none the less fail to cut much ice in the theatre. ... Most of the music is too recessive to be theatrically effective." However, after a 2006 production at the Wexford Festival, Ian Fox wrote, "Fauré's Pénélope is a true rarity, and, although some lovely music was anticipated, it was a surprise how sure the composer's theatrical touch was."

=== Piano works ===
Fauré's major sets of piano works are thirteen nocturnes, thirteen barcarolles, six impromptus, and four valses-caprices. These sets were composed across the decades of his career, and display the change in his style from uncomplicated youthful charm to a final enigmatic, but sometimes fiery introspection, by way of a turbulent period in his middle years. His other notable piano pieces, including shorter works, or collections composed or published as a set, are Romances sans paroles, Ballade in F♯ major, Mazurka in B♭ major, Thème et variations in C♯ minor, and Huit pièces brèves. For piano duet, Fauré composed the Dolly Suite and, together with his friend and former pupil André Messager, an exuberant parody of Wagner in the short suite Souvenirs de Bayreuth.

The piano works often use arpeggiated figures, with the melody interspersed between the two hands, and include finger substitutions natural for organists. These aspects make them daunting for some pianists. Even a virtuoso like Liszt said that he found Fauré's music hard to play. (Note: Fauré visited Liszt in Zürich in July 1882. The elder composer played one of his own compositions and then began Fauré's Ballade in F♯ major. After a few bars he said, "I've run out of fingers", and asked Fauré to play the rest of the piece to him. Nectoux and Duchen speculate that Liszt may have had difficulty in reading the manuscript or wanted to hear how Fauré himself would play.; Jones and Morrison simply state that Liszt found the music "too difficult".) The early piano works are clearly influenced by Chopin. An even greater influence was Schumann, whose piano music Fauré loved more than any other. In Copland's view, it was with the sixth Nocturne that Fauré fully emerged from any predecessor's shadow. The pianist Alfred Cortot said, "There are few pages in all music comparable to these." The critic Bryce Morrison has noted that pianists frequently prefer to play the charming earlier piano works, such as the Impromptu No. 2, rather than the later piano works, which express "such private passion and isolation, such alternating anger and resignation" that listeners are left uneasy. In his piano music, as in most of his works, Fauré shunned virtuosity in favour of the classical lucidity often associated with the French. He was unimpressed by purely virtuoso pianists, saying, "the greater they are, the worse they play me."

=== Orchestral and chamber works ===
Fauré was not greatly interested in orchestration, and on occasion asked his former students such as Jean Roger-Ducasse and Charles Koechlin to orchestrate his concert and theatre works. In Nectoux's words, Fauré's generally sober orchestral style reflects "a definite aesthetic attitude ... The idea of timbre was not a determining one in Fauré's musical thinking". He was not attracted by flamboyant combinations of tone-colours, which he thought either self-indulgent or a disguise for lack of real musical invention. He told his students that it should be possible to produce an orchestration without resorting to glockenspiels, celestas, xylophones, bells or electrical instruments. Debussy admired the spareness of Fauré's orchestration, finding in it the transparency he strove for in his own 1913 ballet Jeux; Poulenc, by contrast, described Fauré's orchestration as "a leaden overcoat ... instrumental mud". Fauré's best-known orchestral works are the suites Masques et bergamasques (based on music for a dramatic entertainment, or divertissement comique), which he orchestrated himself, Dolly, orchestrated by Henri Rabaud, and Pelléas et Mélisande which draws on incidental music for Maeterlinck's play; the stage version was orchestrated by Koechlin, but Fauré himself reworked the orchestration for the published suite.

Pièce for Oboe and Harp
Arranged for bassoon and piano, performed by Kathleen Walsh (bassoon) and Amy Crane (piano)

Élégie
Performed by Hans Goldstein (cello) and Eli Kalman (piano)

Fantaisie
Performed by Alex Murray (flute) and Martha Goldstein (piano)

In the chamber repertoire, his two piano quartets, in C minor and G minor, particularly the former, are among Fauré's better-known works. His other chamber music includes two piano quintets, two cello sonatas, two violin sonatas, a piano trio and a string quartet. Copland (writing in 1924 before the string quartet was finished) held the second quintet (in C minor, Opus 115) to be Fauré's masterpiece: "... a pure well of spirituality ... extremely classic, as far removed as possible from the romantic temperament." Other critics have differed somewhat: The Record Guide commented, "The ceaseless flow and restricted colour scheme of Fauré's last manner, as exemplified in this Quintet, need very careful management, if they are not to become tedious." Fauré's last work, the String Quartet, has been described by critics in Gramophone magazine as an intimate meditation on the last things, and "an extraordinary work by any standards, ethereal and other-worldly with themes that seem constantly to be drawn skywards."

=== Recordings ===
Fauré made piano rolls of his music for several companies between 1905 and 1913. (Note: The rolls of the "Romance sans paroles" No. 3, Barcarolle No. 1, Prelude No. 3, Pavane, Nocturne No. 3, Sicilienne, Thème et variations and Valses-caprices Nos. 1, 3 and 4 survive, and several rolls have been re-recorded on disc.) Well over a hundred recordings of Fauré's music were made between 1898 and 1905, mostly of songs, with a few short chamber works, by performers including the singers Jean Noté and Pol Plançon and players such as Jacques Thibaud and Alfred Cortot. By the 1920s a range of Fauré's more popular songs were on record, including "Après un rêve" sung by Olga Haley, and "Automne" and "Clair de lune" sung by Ninon Vallin. In the 1930s better-known performers recorded Fauré pieces, including Georges Thill ("En prière"), and Jacques Thibaud and Alfred Cortot (Violin Sonata No. 1 and Berceuse). The Sicilienne from Pelléas et Mélisande was recorded in 1938.

By the 1940s there were a few more Fauré works in the catalogues. A survey by John Culshaw in December 1945 singled out recordings of piano works played by Kathleen Long (including the Nocturne No. 6, Barcarolle No. 2, the Thème et Variations, Op. 73, and the Ballade Op. 19 in its orchestral version conducted by Boyd Neel), the Requiem conducted by Ernest Bourmauck, and seven songs sung by Maggie Teyte. Fauré's music began to appear more frequently in the record companies' releases in the 1950s. The Record Guide, 1955, listed the Piano Quartet No. 1, Piano Quintet No. 2, the String Quartet, both Violin Sonatas, the Cello Sonata No. 2, two new recordings of the Requiem, and the complete song cycles La bonne chanson and La chanson d'Ève.

In the LP and particularly the CD era, the record companies have built up a substantial catalogue of Fauré's music, performed by French and non-French musicians. Several modern recordings of Fauré's music have come to public notice as prize-winners in annual awards organised by Gramophone and the BBC. (Note: Among these are, from Gramophone: Gerard Souzay – Best Historical Vocal, 1991; Piano Quartets, Domus – Chamber, 1986; Piano Quintets, Domus – Chamber, 1995; String Quartet (+ Debussy, Ravel), Quatuor Ebène – Recording of the Year, 2009; Nocturnes, Germaine Thyssens-Valentin – Historic Reissue, 2002]; Requiem, Rutter et al – Choral, 1985. Among BBC Awards: String Quartet (+ Franck), Dante Quartet – Chamber, 2009.) Sets of his major orchestral works have been recorded under conductors including Michel Plasson (1981) and Yan Pascal Tortelier (1996). Fauré's main chamber works have all been recorded, with players including the Ysaÿe Quartet, Domus, Paul Tortelier, Arthur Grumiaux, and Joshua Bell. The complete solo piano works have been recorded by Kathryn Stott (1995), Paul Crossley (1984–85) and Lucas Debargue (2021-2022) with substantial sets of the major piano works from Germaine Thyssens-Valentin, Jean-Philippe Collard (1982–84), Pascal Rogé (1990), and Kun-Woo Paik (2002). Fauré's songs have all been recorded for CD, including a complete set (2005), anchored by the accompanist Graham Johnson, with soloists Jean-Paul Fouchécourt, Felicity Lott, John Mark Ainsley and Jennifer Smith, among others. The Requiem and the shorter choral works are also well represented on disc. Pénélope has been recorded twice, with casts headed by Régine Crespin in 1956, and Jessye Norman in 1981, conducted respectively by Désiré-Émile Inghelbrecht and Charles Dutoit. Prométhée has not been recorded in full, but extensive excerpts were recorded under Roger Norrington (1980).

=== Modern assessment ===
A 2001 article on Fauré in Baker's Biographical Dictionary of Musicians concludes thus:

Fauré's stature as a composer is undiminished by the passage of time. He developed a musical idiom all his own; by subtle application of old modes, he evoked the aura of eternally fresh art; by using unresolved mild discords and special coloristic effects, he anticipated procedures of Impressionism; in his piano works, he shunned virtuosity in favor of the Classical lucidity of the French masters of the clavecin; the precisely articulated melodic line of his songs is in the finest tradition of French vocal music. His great Requiem and his Élégie for Cello and Piano have entered the general repertoire.

Fauré's biographer Nectoux writes in the Grove Dictionary of Music and Musicians that Fauré is widely regarded as the greatest master of French song, and that alongside the mélodies, the chamber works rank as "Fauré's most important contribution to music". The critic Robert Orledge writes, "His genius was one of synthesis: he reconciled such opposing elements as modality and tonality, anguish and serenity, seduction and force within a single non-eclectic style, as in the Pelléas et Mélisande suite, his symphonic masterpiece. The quality of constant renewal within an apparently limited range ... is a remarkable facet of his genius, and the spare, elliptical style of his single String Quartet suggests that his intensely self-disciplined style was still developing at the time of his death".

== Notes, references and sources ==
=== Sources ===
- Anderson, Robert (1993). Elgar. London: J M Dent. ISBN 0-460-86054-2.
- Duchen, Jessica (2000). Gabriel Fauré. London: Phaidon. ISBN 0-7148-3932-9.
- Johnson, Graham; Richard Stokes (2009). Gabriel Fauré: The Songs and Their Poets. Farnham, Kent, England, and Burlington, Vt: Ashgate. ISBN 0-7546-5960-7.
- Jones, J Barrie (1989). Gabriel Fauré: A Life in Letters. London: B T Batsford. ISBN 0-7134-5468-7.
- March, Ivan, ed. (2007). The Penguin Guide to Recorded Classical Music 2008. London: Penguin Books. ISBN 0-14-103336-3.
- Moore, Jerrold Northrop (1987). Elgar: A Creative Life. Oxford: Oxford Paperbacks. ISBN 0-19-284014-2.
- Morrison, Bryce (1995). Notes to The Complete Piano Music of Gabriel Fauré. London: Hyperion Records. OCLC 224489565.
- Murray, David (1997). "Fauré, Gabriel". In Amanda Holden (ed.). The Penguin Opera Guide. London: Penguin Books. ISBN 0-14-051385-X.
- Nectoux, Jean-Michel (1984). Gabriel Fauré: His Life Through Letters. Translated by J A Underwood. London: Boyars. ISBN 0-7145-2768-8.
- Nectoux, Jean-Michel (1991). Gabriel Fauré: A Musical Life. Roger Nichols (trans). Cambridge: Cambridge University Press. ISBN 0-521-23524-3.
- Near, John R. Charles-Marie Widor: Symphonie pour orgue et orchestre, opus 42 [bis]. Middleton: A-R Editions. ISBN 0-89579-515-9.
- Nichols, Roger (1987). Ravel Remembered. London: Faber and Faber. ISBN 0-571-14986-3.
- Oliver, Michael (1991). "Fauré: Requiem". In Alan Blyth (ed.). Choral Music on Record. Cambridge: Cambridge University Press. ISBN 0-521-36309-8.
- Orledge, Robert (1979). Gabriel Fauré. London: Eulenburg Books. ISBN 0-903873-40-0.
- Perreau, Stephan (2000). Notes to Ravel and Fauré String Quartets. Hong Kong: Naxos Records. OCLC 189791192.
- Ravel, Maurice (1922). "Les Mélodies de Gabriel Fauré". In Henry Prunières (ed.). Hommage musical à Fauré (in French). Paris: La revue musicale. OCLC 26757829.
- Rosen, David (1995). Verdi: Requiem. Cambridge: Cambridge University Press. ISBN 0-521-39767-7.
- Sackville-West, Edward; Desmond Shawe-Taylor (1955). The Record Guide. London: Collins. OCLC 500373060.
- Vallas, Léon (1951). César Franck. Translated by Hubert Foss. London: Harrap. OCLC 910827.
