= Cantique de Jean Racine =

1866 composition for mixed choir and piano or organ by Gabriel Fauré

- Sacred choral composition by Gabriel Fauré
- Fauré in the uniform of the music school l'École Niedermeyer, which he attended when he composed the piece
- Opus: 11
- Occasion: Composition competition
- Text: Paraphrase by Jean Racine of a hymn for matins from the breviary
- Language: French
- Composed: 1865
- Dedication: César Franck
- Performed: 4 August 1866: Montivilliers abbey
- Vocal: SATB choir
- Instrumental: Versions: Organ; Piano; Strings and organ; Orchestra

Cantique de Jean Racine (Chant by Jean Racine), Op. 11, is a composition for mixed choir and piano or organ by Gabriel Fauré. The text, "Verbe égal au Très-Haut" ("Word, one with the Highest"), is a French paraphrase by Jean Racine of a Latin hymn from the breviary for matins, Consors paterni luminis. The nineteen-year-old composer set the text in 1864–65 for a composition competition at the École Niedermeyer de Paris, and it won him the first prize. The work was first performed the following year on 4 August 1866 in a version with accompaniment of strings and organ. The style shows similarities with his later work, Requiem. Today, the two works are often performed together.

== History ==
Fauré entered the school of church music École Niedermeyer de Paris in 1854, when he was nine years old. There he received training in piano, theory, composition, and classical languages. Weekly choir singing was part of the curriculum for all students. Fauré's teacher in advanced piano was Camille Saint-Saëns, who encouraged him to compose. In 1861 Fauré participated in the first composition competition at the school. In 1863 he submitted a setting of Psalm 137, Super flumina Babylonis, for five vocal parts and orchestra. He received an award but no prize because he had not strictly adhered to all conditions. At age 19, in 1864–65, he composed Cantique de Jean Racine, scored for four vocal parts and piano or organ and that time he received the first prize in the 1865 contest.

Fauré's Cantique was first performed on 4 August 1866 in a version with strings and organ, the organ played by the composer, when the new organ of the Saint-Sauveur Montivilliers Abbey was dedicated. César Franck, the dedicatee of the composition, conducted it, possibly the same version, in an orchestral concert on 15 May 1875. A version for a larger orchestra, with wind instruments but without organ, was possibly written by Fauré himself and first played on 28 January 1906, according to a program of the Société de concerts du Conservatoire. Neither of these orchestral versions were published.

Cantique was first published around 1875 or 1876, by Schoen in Paris, as part of the series Echo des Maîtrises. In recent times, the accompaniment has been arranged for strings and harp by John Rutter, to great acclaim.

== Text and music ==
Verbe égal au Très-Haut, notre unique espérance,
Jour éternel de la terre et des cieux,
De la paisible nuit nous rompons le silence:
Divin Sauveur, jette sur nous les yeux.

Répands sur nous le feu de Ta grâce puissante;
Que tout l'enfer fuie au son de Ta voix;
Dissipe le sommeil d'une âme languissante
Qui la conduit à l'oubli de Tes lois!

Ô Christ! sois favorable à ce peuple fidèle,
Pour Te bénir maintenant rassemblé;
Reçois les chants qu'il offre à Ta gloire immortelle,
Et de Tes dons qu'il retourne comblé.

Translation:

Word of the Highest, our only hope,
Eternal day of earth and the heavens,
We break the silence of the peaceful night;
Saviour Divine, cast your eyes upon us!

Pour on us the fire of your powerful grace,
That all hell may flee at the sound of your voice;
Banish the slumber of a weary soul,
That brings forgetfulness of your laws!

O Christ, look with favour upon your faithful people
Now gathered here to praise you;
Receive their hymns offered to your immortal glory;
May they go forth filled with your gifts.

The French text, "Verbe égal au Très-Haut" (Word, one with the Highest), was written by Jean Racine and published in 1688 in Hymnes traduites du Bréviaire romain. It is a paraphrase of a pseudo-ambrosian hymn for Tuesday matins from the breviary, Consors paterni luminis. Fauré named his composition after Racine, not after the Latin original, possibly because he preferred the "elegant and rather florid" French text.

Organ and choir
Performed by Les Petits Chanteurs de Passy, conducted by Astrid Delaunay

Orchestra and choir

The music is in D♭ major, in common time, marked Andante. The instrumental introduction contains three elements: a calm melody imitated by the voices, a similarly calm bass, and a flowing inner part in ceaseless triplets. The voices enter one after the other, beginning with the lowest, each presenting half a line of text, while the lower voices accompany in homophony. The second stanza is separated from the first by a short interlude similar to the introduction, while the third and final stanza follows immediately in the way of a reprise. The writing for the voices has been described as at the same time transparent and well balanced" ("zugleich durchlässig wie klanglich ausgewogen"). Models such as Mendelssohn and Gounod show, but also a personal style. Zachary Gates notes in a paper dedicated to the work: "The long sweeping melodies and strong melodic and harmonic appoggiaturas in Cantique are a testament to the Romantic side of the piece, but there is a definite contemporary tint to what he's writing, hidden in very minute and well-justified atonal note choices in the harmonic structure and melody. After ten years of training at the school focused on liturgy, Fauré was able to set "the inspiring text with a gorgeously restrained and respectful charm".

Cantique de Jean Racine already showed traits of his later Requiem, which Fauré composed in 1887, such as "dignity and refined simplicity" (Würde und die vollendete Einfachheit). Both works have often been performed together in concerts and recordings.

== Recordings ==
Cantique de Jean Racine has been recorded often, frequently with Fauré's Requiem. Paavo Järvi conducted in 2011 both works, combined with the first recording of Super flumina Babylonis, leading the Orchestre de Paris and its choir. A recording of both pieces in their original scoring was released in 2014 with the Choir of King's College, Cambridge, and the Orchestra of the Age of Enlightenment, conducted by Stephen Cleobury.
