= Clément Loret =

French organist, composer and music educator

Clément Loret (10 October 1833 – 14 February 1909) was an organist, music educator, and composer of Belgian origin, French naturalized.

== Biography ==
Clément Loret was born in Dendermonde (Termonde) in Belgium. His father Hippolyte, organist (at Notre-Dame de Termonde) and organ builder, introduced him to music and the organ at a very young age. He started playing in church when he was 7 years old, and the following year he occasionally replaced his father at the keyboard. In 1846, his father was appointed organist at Mons, and the young Clément continued his musical studies with Jules Denefve (1814–1877).

Admitted to the Royal Conservatory of Brussels in 1851, he was a student of Lemmens for the organ and Fétis for the counterpoint. He won a First Prize in 1853.

In 1855, Loret came to Paris. Lemmens had written him a letter of introduction to Aristide Cavaillé-Coll, who was so little impressed by the young man that he dared not present him to his acquaintances. However, he linked up with Auguste Victor Mustel, an harmonium factor, who decided him to stay. He then held organist positions at Suresnes and Notre-Dame des Victoires. Then, he was named titular holder of the new Cavaillé-Coll organ of the National Basilica dedicated to St. Geneviève (now Panthéon de Paris) during the Second French Empire, from 1855 to 1885, and occupied the gallery of Église Saint-Louis-d'Antin, where Niederermeyer was maître de chapelle from 1858 to 1866.

Appointed professor of organ at the Niedermeyer school of Paris in 1858, he trained most of the French organists of the time including Fauré, Letocart and Gigout.

His brother Charles, who died young, was also a musician and composer. His wife, Philippine Colonius, was a talented musician.

Their son, Victor Loret (1 September 1859 – 3 February 1946) was a musician, musicologist and a very famous French Egyptologist. A friend of Camille Saint-Saëns, he was interested in music and instruments from the Pharaonic period. As ethnomusicologist, he transcribed traditional melodies and dances from the south of the valley.

Clément Loret died in Colombes, near Paris, on 14 February 1909,

== Works ==
Several of his works have been published in Paris by Loret Fils & H. Freytag, his publishing house.

=== Organ ===
- 50 Pièces d’orgue pour messes et vêpres, Régnier-Canaux, Paris
- 24 Morceaux pour orgue sans pédale, Régnier-Canaux, Paris
- Le Service divin, 6 Entrées, 6 Offertoires, 6 Élévations, 6 Communions, 6 Sorties, morceaux faciles, Heugel, Paris (1899)
- Première Sonate in B♭ minor for organ, Op. 25 (1889)
- Offertoire pour Pâques on O Filii et filiœ
- Postlude "Alleluia!" in E♭ major for organ
- Fantaisie pastorale
- 8 Morceaux d'orgue expressif: 1. Rêverie (Mazurka) - 2. Absence - 3. Pastorale - 4. Mélancolie - 5. Prise de voile - 6. Boléro - 7. Rêverie - 8. Romance sans paroles (Les Concerts de famille)
- Bénédiction nuptiale in L major.
- Pièce à double expression en forme de canon
- Variations sur des noëls for organ (1890)
- 6 Concertos pour orgue et orchestre de G. F. Hændel, (Op. 4) arranged for organ only, with fermatas (cadences)
- 6 Concertos pour orgue et orchestre de G. F. Hændel, (Op. 7) arranged for organ only, with fermatas (cadences)
- Cours d’orgue Op. 19: I. Orgue sans pédale, II. Orgue avec pédale, III. Les combinaisons sur les orgues modernes et l’improvisation, IV. Le plain-chant et son accompagnement. (1858–80)
- Exercices d’orgue, 3 issues, in La Maîtrise, Paris, 1859
- 24 Études pour orgue, 12 without pedal, 12 with pédal, Heugel, Paris
- Pièces de genre : Sur les ondes – La Flûte enchantée (Mozart) – Enivrement – Cantilène – Souvenir – Les pifferari – Alceste (Gluck)

==== Twelve Pieces for Organ (1898) ====
1. Allegro maestoso in G minor
2. Prière in E♭ major
3. Chacone in B♭ major
4. Offertoire in D major
5. Prélude et fugue in B♭ major
6. Pièce légère in G major
7. Grand-Chœur in B♭ major
8. Élévation in E♭ major
9. Scherzo in B minor
10. Communion in L major
11. Cantilène in F major
12. Final in D minor

==== Six Pieces for Organ (v. 1900) ====
- Marche nuptiale in B♭ major, Op. 40
- Cantabile in B minor, Op. 41
- Prière in D♭ major, Op. 42
- Andante religioso in G major, Op. 43
- Canzone in B minor, Op. 44
- Scherzo-Fanfare in G major, Op. 45

=== Others ===
- 12 Morceaux for harmonium
- 12 Morceaux for harmonium and piano
- Deuxième nocturne, for piano and organ
- Boléro, for piano and organ
- Symphonie in D for large orchestra (unpublished)
- Le Calvaire, oratorio (unpublished)
- Concerto for piano and orchestra (unpublished)

=== Mélodies ===
Glisse ô ma barque (barcarolle) - Les deux captifs - Dis-moi je t’aime - Dormez (sérénade) - L’enfant de la négresse - La fleur - L’oreiller d’un enfant - Rêver, prier, aimer - L’été - Oui, c’est toi que j’aime (chez l’auteur à Paris)

=== Piano ===
- Studies
- 12 Morceaux pour piano : 1. Marche Nuptiale - 2. Menuet - 3. Romance sans Paroles - 4. Rosée de Printemps (mazurka) - 5. Scherzo - 6. Rêverie-Nocturne - 7. Rondo - 8. Pluie dans le Lac - 9. Andantino - 10. Dors mon Enfant - 11. Caprice-Mazurka - 12. Valse Tyrolienne, chez l’auteur à Paris, s.d.
- Préludes and fugues
- Romances sans paroles

=== Recordings ===
A selection of works for organ by Clément Loret has been recorded on the Cavaillé-Coll organs at Pezenas and Carcassonne by Jean-Luc Salique (2 CD Coriolan, 1998).

== Sources ==
- F.-J. Fétis, Biographie Universelle des musiciens, Supplément et complément, t. 2, Paris, Librairie de Firmin Didot, 1880.
- Jean-Claude Goyon, Victor Loret, Dictionnaire critique des historiens de l’art, INHA (Institut National de l’Histoire de l’Art)
- Orpha Ochse, Organists and Organ Playing in Nineteenth-Century France and Belgium, Bloomington, Indiana University Press, 1994.
