= Piano Quartet in G minor =

Piano Quartet in G minor may refer to:

- Piano Quartet No. 1 (Mozart)
- Piano Quartet No. 1 (Brahms)
- Piano Quartet No. 2 (Fauré)
