= Léon Boëllmann =

French composer and organist (1862–1897)

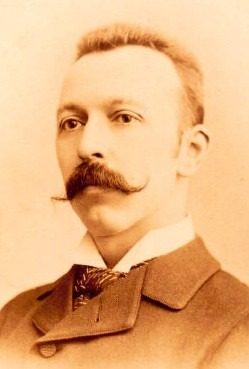
- Boëllmann in 1896
- Born: 25 September 1862; Ensisheim, Haut-Rhin, Alsace
- Died: 11 October 1897 (aged 35)
- Education: L'École Niedermeyer in Paris
- Occupations: composer and organist
- Known for: compositions for organ
- Notable work: Suite gothique
- Spouse: Louise Lefèvre (m. 1885)
- Children: 3, including Marie-Louise Boëllmann-Gigout

Léon Boëllmann (French pronunciation: [leɔ̃ bɔ.ɛlman]; 25 September 1862 – 11 October 1897) was a French composer, known for a small number of compositions for organ. His best-known composition is Suite gothique (1895), which is a staple of the organ repertoire, especially its concluding Toccata.

== Life ==
Boëllmann was born in Ensisheim, Haut-Rhin, Alsace, the son of a pharmacist. In 1871, at the age of nine, he entered the École de Musique Classique et Religieuse (L'École Niedermeyer) in Paris, where he studied with its director, Gustave Lefèvre, and with Eugène Gigout. There, Boëllmann won first prizes in piano, organ, counterpoint, fugue, plainsong, and composition. After his graduation in 1881, Boëllmann was appointed "organiste de choeur" at the Church of St. Vincent de Paul in the 10th arrondissement of Paris, and six years later he became cantor and organiste titulaire, a position he held until his early death, from tuberculosis.

In 1885, Boëllmann married Louise, the daughter of Gustave Lefèvre and the niece of Eugène Gigout, into whose house the couple moved (having no children of his own, Gigout adopted Boëllmann). Boëllmann then taught in Gigout's school of organ playing and improvisation.

As a student of Gigout, Boëllmann moved in the circles of the French musical world. He made friends of many artists and was able to give concerts both in Paris and the provinces. Boëllmann became known as "a dedicated teacher, trenchant critic, gifted composer and successful performer ... who coaxed pleasing sounds out of recalcitrant instruments". Boëllmann also wrote musical criticism for L'Art musical under the pseudonym "le Révérend Père Léon" and "un Garçon of the Salle Pleyel".

Boëllmann died in 1897, aged 35. After the death of his wife the following year, Gigout reared their three orphans, one of whom, Marie-Louise Boëllmann-Gigout (1891–1977), became a distinguished organ teacher in her own right.

== Works ==
During the sixteen years of his professional life, Boëllmann composed about 160 pieces in all genres. Faithful to the style of Franck and an admirer of Saint-Saëns, Boëllmann nonetheless exhibits a turn-of-the-century Post-romantic aesthetic which, especially in his organ works, demonstrates "remarkable sonorities". His best-known composition is Suite gothique (1895), now a staple of the organ repertoire, especially its concluding Toccata, a piece "of moderate difficulty but brilliant effect", with a dramatic minor theme and a rhythmic emphasis that made it popular even in Boëllmann's day. Boëllmann also wrote motets and art songs, works for piano, a symphony, works for cello, orchestra and organ as well as a cello sonata (dedicated to Jules Delsart), and other chamber works.

== List of compositions ==
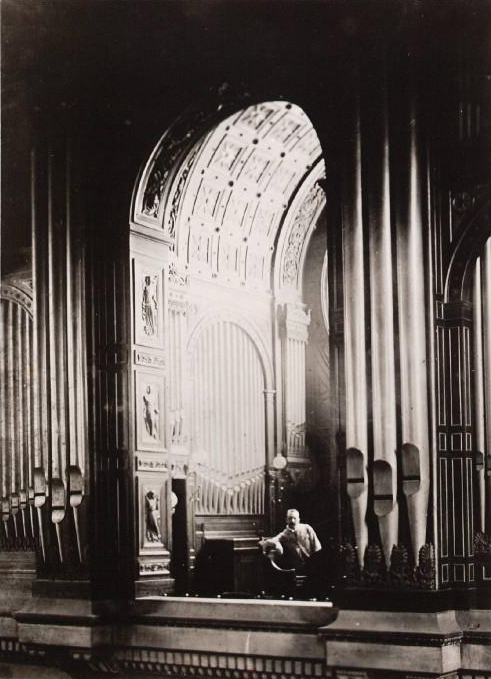
Léon Boëllmann at the organ of Saint-Vincent-de-Paul church, Paris

=== Organ ===
- Douze pièces, Op. 16 (1890)
- Suite gothique, Op. 25 (1895)
- Deuxième suite, Op. 27 (1896)
- Les Heures mystiques, Op. 29/30 (1896)
- Ronde française, Op. 37 (arr. Choisnel)
- Offertoire sur les Noëls
- Fantaisie

=== Piano ===
- Valse, Op. 8
- Deuxième valse, Op. 14
- Aubade, Op. 15 No. 1
- Feuillet d'album, Op. 15 No. 3
- 2e Impromptu, Op. 15 No. 4
- Improvisations, Op. 28
- Nocturne, Op. 36
- Ronde française, Op. 37
- Gavotte
- Prélude & fugue
- Scherzo-Caprice

=== Chamber music ===
- Piano Quartet in F minor, Op. 10
- Piano Trio in G major, Op. 19
- Sonata for Cello and Piano in A minor, Op. 40
- Suite for Cello and Piano, Op. 6
- 2 Pièces for cello and piano, Op. 31
- Pièce pour violoncelle et piano

=== Voice ===
- Conte d'amour, Op. 26 (3 mélodies)

=== Orchestra ===
- Fantaisie dialoguée, Op. 35, for organ and orchestra
- Intermezzo, for orchestra
- Ma bien aimée, for voice and orchestra
- Rondel, for small orchestra
- Scènes du Moyen-Âge, for orchestra
- Symphony in F major, Op. 24
- Variations symphoniques, Op. 23, for cello and orchestra

== Selected recordings ==
- Suite gothique, Op. 25, Deuxième Suite, Op. 27, Offertoire sur des noëls, Carillon et Choral des Douze Pièces Op. 16, Deux esquisses, Fantaisie, Heures mystiques (extracts), Op. 29 & 30, Helga Schauerte-Maubouet, Kuhn organ of Minden cathedral, Germany: Syrius SYR 141374.
