= Le Lac (poem) =

Poem by Alphonse de Lamartine

The Lake
- by Alphonse de Lamartine
- Original title: Le Lac
- Country: France
- Language: French

Le Lac (English: The Lake) is a poem by French poet Alphonse de Lamartine. The poem was published in 1820.

The poem consists of sixteen quatrains. It was met with great acclaim and propelled its author to the forefront of famous romantic poets.

The poem is often compared to the Tristesse d'Olympio of Victor Hugo and the Souvenir of Alfred de Musset. It was set to music by Niedermeyer and more recently by British composer David Matthews, which was premiered by the Orchestra of the Swan and soprano April Fredrick under the baton of Kenneth Woods in 2019.

== Background ==
Lamartine admired Julie Charles, the wife of the famous physicist Jacques Charles. The two planned to meet at Lac du Bourget in August 1817, but she died of tuberculosis. Lamartine returned to the lake alone.

== Le lac ==
Ainsi, toujours poussés vers de nouveaux rivages,
Dans la nuit éternelle emportés sans retour,
Ne pourrons-nous jamais sur l'océan des âges
Jeter l'ancre un seul jour ?

Ô lac ! l'année à peine a fini sa carrière,
Et près des flots chéris qu'elle devait revoir,
Regarde ! je viens seul m'asseoir sur cette pierre
Où tu la vis s'asseoir !

Tu mugissais ainsi sous ces roches profondes;
Ainsi tu te brisais sur leurs flancs déchirés;
Ainsi le vent jetait l'écume de tes ondes
Sur ses pieds adorés.

Un soir, t'en souvient-il ? nous voguions en silence;
On n'entendait au loin, sur l'onde et sous les cieux,
Que le bruit des rameurs qui frappaient en cadence
Tes flots harmonieux.

Tout à coup des accents inconnus à la terre
Du rivage charmé frappèrent les échos,
Le flot fut attentif, et la voix qui m'est chère
Laissa tomber ces mots :

« Ô temps, suspends ton vol ! et vous, heures propices,
Suspendez votre cours !
Laissez-nous savourer les rapides délices
Des plus beaux de nos jours !

« Assez de malheureux ici-bas vous implorent;
Coulez, coulez pour eux;
Prenez avec leurs jours les soins qui les dévorent;
Oubliez les heureux.

« Mais je demande en vain quelques moments encore,
Le temps m'échappe et fuit;
Je dis à cette nuit : " Sois plus lente "; et l'aurore
Va dissiper la nuit.

« Aimons donc, aimons donc ! de l'heure fugitive,
Hâtons-nous, jouissons !
L'homme n'a point de port, le temps n'a point de rive;
Il coule, et nous passons ! »

Temps jaloux, se peut-il que ces moments d'ivresse,
Où l'amour à longs flots nous verse le bonheur,
S'envolent loin de nous de la même vitesse
Que les jours de malheur ?

Hé quoi ! n'en pourrons-nous fixer au moins la trace ?
Quoi ! passés pour jamais ? quoi ! tout entiers perdus ?
Ce temps qui les donna, ce temps qui les efface,
Ne nous les rendra plus ?

Éternité, néant, passé, sombres abîmes,
Que faites-vous des jours que vous engloutissez ?
Parlez : nous rendrez-vous ces extases sublimes
Que vous nous ravissez ?

Ô lac ! rochers muets ! grottes ! forêt obscure !
Vous que le temps épargne ou qu'il peut rajeunir,
Gardez de cette nuit, gardez, belle nature,
Au moins le souvenir !

Qu'il soit dans ton repos, qu'il soit dans tes orages,
Beau lac, et dans l'aspect de tes riants coteaux,
Et dans ces noirs sapins, et dans ces rocs sauvages
Qui pendent sur tes eaux !

Qu'il soit dans le zéphyr qui frémit et qui passe,
Dans les bruits de tes bords par tes bords répétés,
Dans l'astre au front d'argent qui blanchit ta surface
De ses molles clartés !

Que le vent qui gémit, le roseau qui soupire,
Que les parfums légers de ton air embaumé,
Que tout ce qu'on entend, l'on voit et l'on respire,
Tout dise : " Ils ont aimé ! »

So driven onward to new shores forever,
Into the night eternal swept away,
Upon the sea of time can we not ever
Drop anchor for one day?

O Lake! Scarce has a single year coursed past.
To waves that she was meant to see again,
I come alone to sit upon this stone
You saw her sit on then.

You lowed just so below those plunging cliffs.
Just so you broke about their riven flanks.
Just so the wind flung your spray forth to wash
Her feet which graced your banks.

Recall the evening we sailed out in silence?
On waves beneath the skies, afar and wide,
Naught but the rowers' rhythmic oars we heard
Stroking your tuneful tide.

Then of a sudden tones untold on earth,
Resounded round the sounding spellbound sea.
The tide attended; and I heard these words
From the voice dear to me:

Pause in your trek O Time! Pause in your flight,
Favorable hours, and stay!
Let us enjoy the transient delight
That fills our fairest day.

Unhappy crowds cry out to you in prayers.
Flow, Time, and set them free.
Run through their days and through their ravening cares!
But leave the happy be.

In vain I pray the hours to linger on
And Time slips into flight.
I tell this night: "Be slower!" and the dawn
Undoes the raveled night.

Let's love, then! Love, and feel while feel we can
The moment on its run.
There is no shore of Time, no port of Man.
It flows, and we go on.

Covetous Time! Our mighty drunken moments
When love pours forth huge floods of happiness;
Can it be true that they depart no faster
Than days of wretchedness?

Why can we not keep some trace at the least?
Gone wholly? Lost forever in the black?
Will Time that gave them, Time that now elides them
Never once bring them back?

Eternity, naught, past, dark gulfs: what do
You do with days of ours which you devour?
Speak! Shall you not bring back those things sublime?
Return the raptured hour?

O Lake, caves, silent cliffs and darkling wood,
Whom Time has spared or can restore to light,
Beautiful Nature, let there live at least
The memory of that night:

Let it be in your stills and in your storms,
Fair Lake, in your cavorting sloping sides,
In the black pine trees, in the savage rocks
That hang above your tides;

Let it be in the breeze that stirs and passes,
In sounds resounding shore to shore each night,
In the star's silver countenance that glances
Your surface with soft light.

Let the deep keening winds, the sighing reeds,
Let the light balm you blow through cliff and grove,
Let all that is beheld or heard or breathed
Say only "they did love."

== See also ==
- Antoine Léonard Thomas
