= Clair de lune (Fauré) =

Song composed in 1887 by Gabriel Fauré

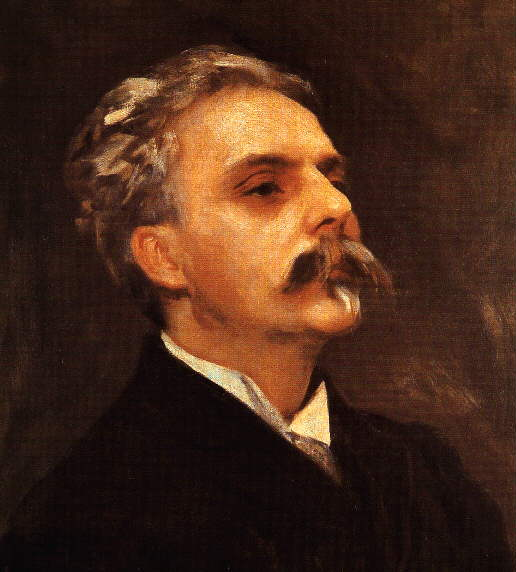
Gabriel Fauré in 1889, by John Singer Sargent

"Clair de lune", ("Moonlight") Op. 46 No 2, is a song by Gabriel Fauré, composed in 1887 to words by Paul Verlaine.

== History ==
Fauré's 1887 setting of the poem was for voice and piano; but in 1888, at the instigation of the Princesse de Polignac, he made a version for voice and orchestra, first performed at the Société Nationale de Musique in April of that year, with the tenor Maurice Bàges as soloist. In its orchestral form the song was included in Fauré's incidental music Masques et bergamasques in 1919. The original published version (Hamelle, Paris, 1888) is in B-flat minor. The song is dedicated to Fauré's friend the painter Emmanuel Jadin, who was a talented amateur pianist.

The pianist Graham Johnson notes that it closes Fauré's second period and opens the doors into his third. Johnson notes that it is "for many people the quintessential French mélodie".

== Lyric ==
The lyric is from Paul Verlaine's early collection Fêtes galantes (1869). It inspired not only Fauré but Claude Debussy, who set it in 1881 and wrote a well known piano piece inspired by it in 1891.

French
Clair de lune

Votre âme est un paysage choisi
Que vont charmant masques et bergamasques
Jouant du luth et dansant et quasi
Tristes sous leurs déguisements fantasques.

Tout en chantant sur le mode mineur
L'amour vainqueur et la vie opportune,
Ils n'ont pas l'air de croire à leur bonheur
Et leur chanson se mêle au clair de lune,

Au calme clair de lune triste et beau,
Qui fait rêver les oiseaux dans les arbres
Et sangloter d'extase les jets d'eau,
Les grands jets d'eau sveltes parmi les marbres.

English
Moonlight

Your soul is a chosen landscape
Where charming masqueraders and bergamasquers go
Playing the lute and dancing and almost
Sad beneath their fantastic disguises.

They all sing in a minor key
About triumphant love and fortunate life,
They do not seem to believe in their fortune
And their song blends with the light of the moon,

In the calm moonlight, sad and beautiful,
Which has the birds dreaming in the trees
And the fountains sobbing in ecstasy,

The tall fountains, slender amid marble statues. (Note: An anonymous rhyming English version reads: Your soul is as a moonlit landscape fair, Peopled with maskers delicate and dim, That play on lutes and dance and have an air Of being sad in their fantastic trim. The while they celebrate in minor strain Triumphant love, effective enterprise, They have an air of knowing all is vain,— And through the quiet moonlight their songs rise, The melancholy moonlight, sweet and lone, That makes to dream the birds upon the tree, And in their polished basins of white stone The fountains tall to sob with ecstasy)

== Notes references and sources ==
=== Sources ===
- Nectoux, Jean-Michel (1991). Gabriel Fauré – A Musical Life. Roger Nichols (trans.). Cambridge: Cambridge University Press. ISBN 978-0-521-23524-2.
