= Masques et bergamasques =

Orchestral suite by Gabriel Fauré

Fauré in the grounds of the Paris Conservatoire, 1918

Masques et bergamasques, Op. 112, is an orchestral suite by Gabriel Fauré. It was arranged by the composer from incidental music he provided for a theatrical entertainment commissioned for Albert I, Prince of Monaco in 1919. The original score contained eight numbers, including two songs for tenor, and a choral passage. These numbers were not included in the published suite, which has four movements.

== History ==
In 1918 Raoul Gunsbourg, manager of the Opéra de Monte-Carlo, invited Fauré to write a short work for the theatre. The impetus came from Fauré's friend and former teacher Camille Saint-Saëns, who suggested to Prince Albert that he should commission Fauré to write a short work for the Monte Carlo theatre. Fauré's opera Pénélope (1913) had been premiered there, and although he felt Gunsbourg had not fully appreciated the opera, Fauré accepted the new commission. He was director of the Paris Conservatoire, and his official duties limited the time he had for composition. For the proposed "choreographic divertissement", also billed as a "comédie lyrique", he reused material from earlier compositions.

Fauré proposed a story based on the poem "Clair de lune" from the collection Fêtes galantes by Paul Verlaine (1869). Fauré had set the poem to music in 1887. The title of the new work was taken from the opening lines of the poem. (Note: Votre âme est un paysage choisi Que vont charmant masques et bergamasques Jouant du luth et dansant et quasi Tristes sous leurs déguisements fantasques In English: Your soul is a delicate landscape Where roam charming masks and bergamasques Playing the lute and dancing and seeming almost Sad under their whimsical disguises) The librettist of Pénélope, René Fauchois, provided a scenario accordingly. In the early 20th century the commedia dell'arte of the 16th and 17th centuries provided inspiration for a number of musical works, including Schoenberg's melodrama Pierrot lunaire (1912) and Stravinsky's ballet Pulcinella (1920). Fauchois' story has a commedia dell'arte troupe spying on the amorous encounters of aristocrats in its audience. The scenery for the production was based on Watteau's "L'Escarpolette".

The Monte Carlo production was such a success that Albert Carré put the work on at the Opéra-Comique in Paris in March 1920, where it was performed more than 100 times over the next thirty years. The Fauré scholar Jean-Michel Nectoux describes it as paradoxical that Fauré's most frequently performed stage work is also his least ambitious. The British premiere was given on 7 October 1920 at the Promenade Concerts, under the baton of Henry Wood.

== Score ==
The eight movements of the divertissement were almost all drawn from earlier works of Fauré:

1. Ouverture (from an abandoned 1869 symphony)
2. Pastorale (the only wholly new movement)
3. Madrigal (Op. 35, 1884; for chorus and orchestra)
4. Le Plus doux chemin (Op. 87, No. 1; for tenor and orchestra)
5. Menuet (extensively reworked from the 1869 symphony)
6. Clair de lune (Op. 46, No. 2; for tenor and orchestra)
7. Gavotte (from the 1869 symphony)
8. Pavane (Op. 50, 1887)

The suite drawn from the work has remained one of Fauré's most popular works. It was published by Durand et cie in 1919. It is scored for 2 flutes, 2 oboes, 2 clarinets, 2 bassoons, 2 horns, 2 trumpets, timpani, harp and strings. The suite, which has a typical playing time of about 14 minutes, consists of four of the purely orchestral movements:

=== I. Ouverture ===
The movement is in 2/2 time in F major, marked Allegro molto vivo, with a metronome mark of = 152. It begins with a swift, light theme marked leggiero, and maintains an unflagging tempo throughout, including two passages marked espressivo. After the first performance, Fauré wrote to his wife, "Reynaldo Hahn says that the ouverture sounds like Mozart imitating Fauré – an amusing idea." The typical playing time of the overture is about 3 1/2 minutes.

=== II. Menuet ===
The second movement, in 3/4 time in F major, is marked Tempo di minuetto, Allegro moderato, with a metronome mark of = 108. There are no dynamic extremes in the movement: the quietest marking is p and the loudest, f. Nectoux comments that the movement verges on pastiche, and remarks that its most characterful phrase is taken note for note from Fauré's 1910 Preludes for Piano, Op. 103. The minuet has a typical playing time of little under 3 minutes.

=== III. Gavotte ===
The third movement is in D minor. It is marked Allegro vivo; metronome, = 100. A middle section is marked by a switch to D major, before the movement resumes the first theme in D minor. Like the ouverture, the gavotte is taken from one of Fauré's earliest compositions. Nectoux refers to a piano version from 1869, and an orchestral version largely the same as in Masques et bergamasques in the Suite d'orchestre, Op. 20 (1873–74). The typical playing time of the gavotte is a little over 3 minutes.

=== IV. Pastorale ===
The suite ends with a movement in D major, in 6/4 time, marked Andantino tranqillo, at . = 46. The Pastorale is the only part of the suite specially written for the 1919 divertissement. Nectoux rates it as "vintage Fauré", citing "consecutive block harmonics, wide melodic leaps … the juxtaposition of melodic segments to form the exposition and the ease with which the developments unfold". In his view, the sweetness of the movement is tempered by expressive harmonic clashes such as D♯ against E♮, and C♯ against D♮. As the movement nears its conclusion, Fauré brings back the opening theme of the ouverture as a countermelody. The movement ends quietly, but in Nectoux's view the composer was right to move the Pastorale from its place near the beginning of the divertissement to be the last movement of the suite: "without doubt the crowning glory of Masques et bergamasques", and Fauré's "final farewell to the orchestra". The Pastorale is the longest of the four movements in the suite, with a typical playing time of about 4 minutes.

== Notes, references and sources ==
=== Sources ===
- Duchen, Jessica (2000). Gabriel Fauré. London: Phaidon. ISBN 978-0-7148-3932-5.
- Fauré, Gabriel (1920). Masques et Bergamasques. Suite d'orchestre. Paris: A. Durand et fils. OCLC 844205321.
- Jones, J. Barrie (1989). Gabriel Fauré – A Life in Letters. London: B T Batsford. ISBN 978-0-7134-5468-0.
- Nectoux, Jean-Michel (1991). Gabriel Fauré – A Musical Life. Roger Nichols (trans). Cambridge: Cambridge University Press. ISBN 978-0-521-23524-2.
