= Alexandre-Étienne Choron =

French musicologist

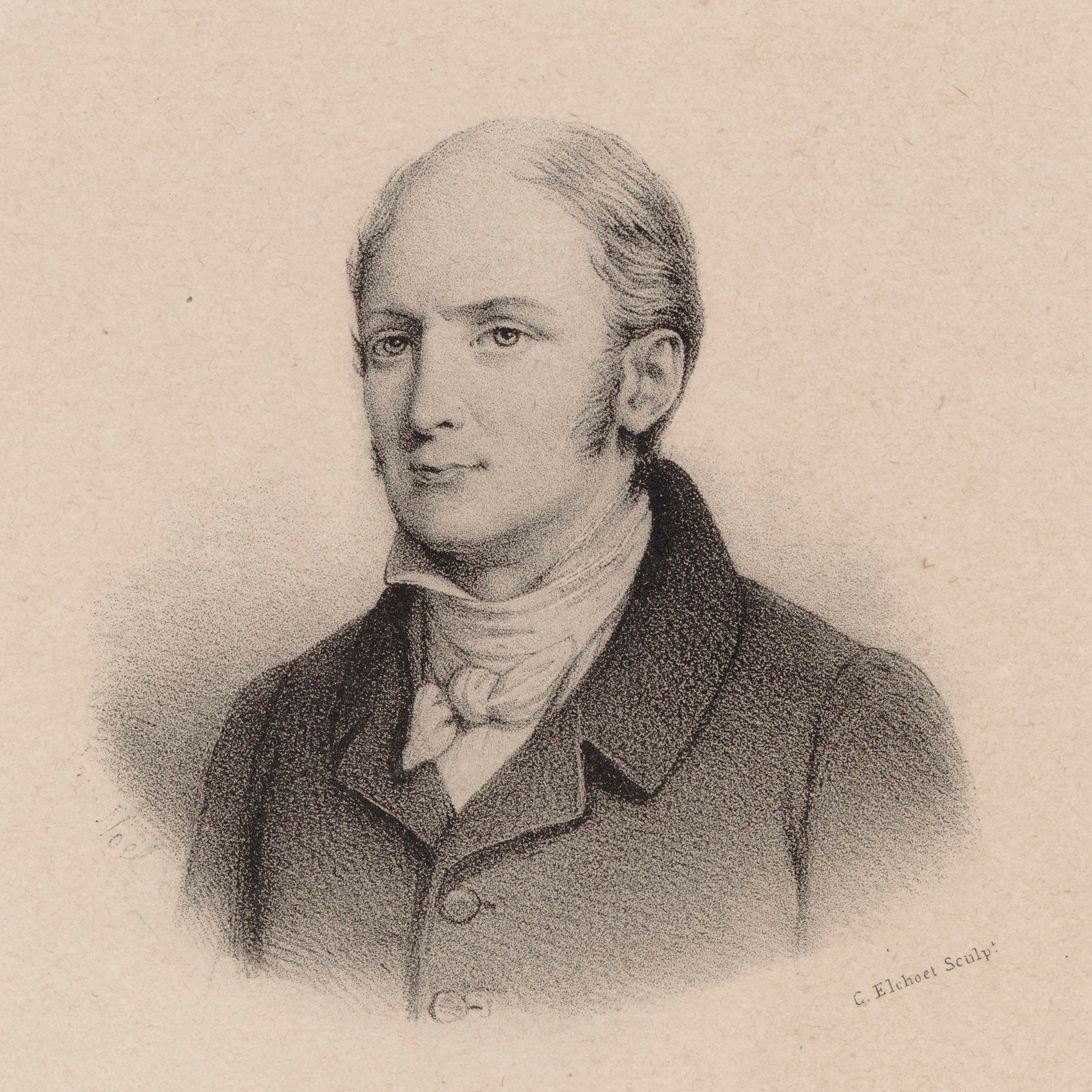
- Born: 21 October 1771; Caen, France
- Died: 29 June 1834 (aged 62); Paris, France
- Occupation: Musicologist

Alexandre-Étienne Choron (21 October 1771 – 29 June 1834) was a French musicologist. For a short time he directed the Paris Opera. He made a distinction between sacred and secular music and was one of the originators of French interest in musicology.

== Biography ==
Choron studied mathematics at the Collège de Juilly. Since his father had forbidden him to study music, he taught himself the theories of Jean-Philippe Rameau, followed by lessons in harmony from abbé Roze and Bonesi. Bonesi familiarized him with Italian music and the treatises on fugue and strict counterpoint of Nicola Sala (1713–1801). He drew from these his book Principes de composition des écoles d'Italie. He learned German, studied musical treatises in that language, then undertook to reform all branches of musical activity.

A professor of mathematics at the École Polytechnique since its founding, then a corresponding member of the Académie des Beaux-Arts, Choron was charged in 1811 with reorganizing the choir schools with the title of Director of Music of Religious Ceremonies.

Named director of the Paris Opéra on 18 January 1816, he instituted the reopening of the Paris Conservatory, which had been closed since 1815, under the name of École royale de chant et de déclamation. On 30 March 1817 he was forced to resign the directorship of the Opera, without a pension, as a result of having wanted to make too many radical changes.

In 1817, he founded and directed the Institution royale de musique classique et religieuse. Its influence was considerable. It trained or influenced some of the most important artists of this era, notably the celebrated singers Gilbert Duprez and Rosine Stoltz, and the actress Rachel Felix. It published and had performed publicly very old choral works, including those of Palestrina, Bach and Handel.

With the July Revolution in 1830, the government withdrew his subsidies, and the institution ran into grave difficulties. Choron died soon thereafter in 1834. The institution was resuscitated under the name of Conservatoire royal de musique classique de France or École Niedermeyer by Louis Niedermeyer, who thus ensured the transmission of the principles and teachings of Choron.

Choron published numerous musical works. He also left behind his voluminous papers, preserved at the Bibliothèque nationale de France.

== Works ==
- 1808: Principes de composition des écoles d’Italie (based on Nicola Sala, teacher at the Pieta dei Turchini conservatory)
- 1810–11, revised 1817: Dictionnaire historique des musiciens, artistes et amateurs, morts ou vivants (with François-Joseph-Marie Fayolle)
- 1811: Méthode élémentaire de musique et de plain-chant
- 1813: Revised and augmented edition of Traité général des voix et des instruments d'orchestre by L. Francoeur
- 1814–16: translations of theoretical works of Albrechtsberger and F. Azopardi
- 1820: Méthode concertante à 3 parties
- 1820: Méthode de chant
- 1836–39: Manuel complet de musique vocale et instrumentale, ou Encyclopédie musicale (with la Fage)

== Bibliography ==
- Hutchings, Arthur and Hervé Audéon, "Choron, Alexandre(-Etienne)" in Grove Music Online
- Meidhof, Nathalie, Alexandre Étiennes Akkordlehre. Konzepte, Quellen, Verbreitung, Olms, Hildesheim 2016.
- Réty, Hippolyte, Notice historique sur Choron et son École : discours prononcé à l'Académie de Mâcon le 22 novembre 1872, C. Douniol, Paris, 1873, 25 p.
- Simms, Bryan Randolph, Alexandre Choron (1771-1834) as an historian and theorist of music, Ph.D. Diss., Yale University, 1971.
