= Suite Gothique =

Suite for organ by Léon Boëllmann

Suite gothique
- Suite by Léon Boëllmann
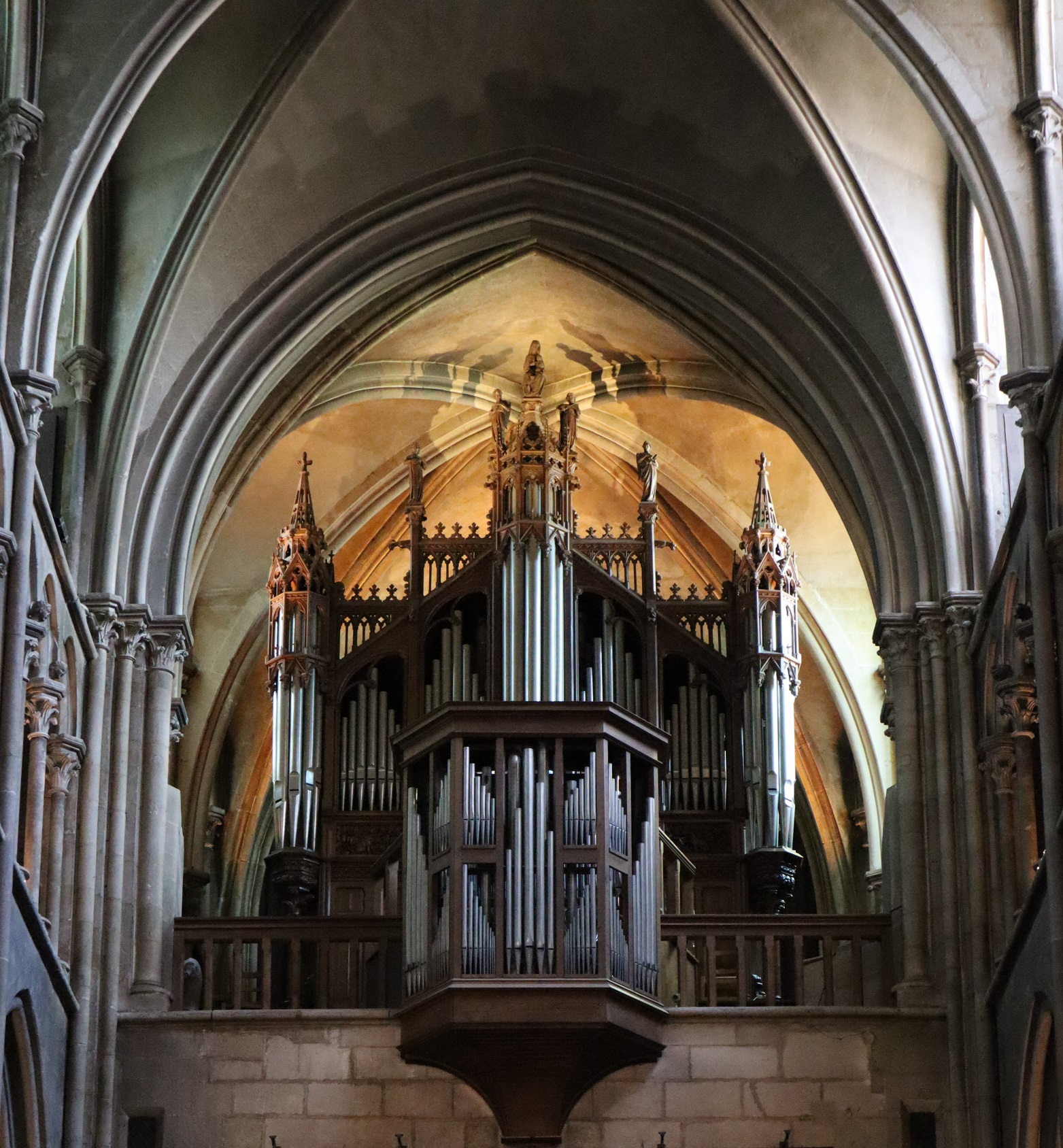
- Ghys organ at Notre-Dame in Dijon
- Occasion: consecration of the Ghys organ
- Composed: 1895
- Movements: 4
- Scoring: organ

Suite gothique, Op. 25 is a suite for organ composed by Léon Boëllmann in 1895 for the consecration of the Ghys organ at Notre-Dame in Dijon.

The suite consists of four movements:

1. Introduction – Choral (C minor)
2. Menuet gothique (C major)
3. Prière à Notre-Dame (A♭major)
4. Toccata (C minor)

The first movement (Introduction - Choral) is in C minor and is made up of harmonized choral phrases that are first played in block chords on the great and pedals, and then repeated, piano, on the Swell. The second movement (Menuet gothique) is in 3/4 time and in C major. The third movement (Prière à Notre-Dame) is in A♭ major; it rarely uses dynamics above 'piano'. The final fourth movement (Toccata) is the best-known of the suite. This movement returns to C minor, ending with a Tierce de Picardie on full organ.

The suite was transcribed for brass band by Eric Ball, and is frequently used as a concert finale by bands such as Fodens, Black Dyke and Brighouse & Rastrick, as well as a test piece in contesting.

== In popular culture ==
The Smurfs, a 1981 television series with widespread usage of classical pieces, used the suite.
