= Piano Quartet No. 1 (Fauré) =

1879 composition by Gabriel Fauré

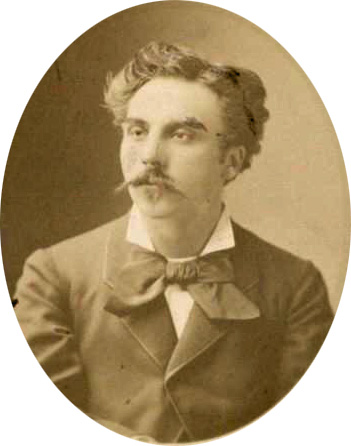
Fauré in 1875

Gabriel Fauré's Piano Quartet No. 1, in C minor, Op. 15, is one of the two chamber works he wrote for the conventional piano quartet combination of piano, violin, viola and cello. Despite being in a minor key it is predominantly positive in tone, though with some hints in the slow movement of the emotional turmoil of Fauré's life at the time of the composition. He later wrote a second work in the form. The quartet is dedicated to Belgian violinist Hubert Léonard.

== Background ==
In 1877, after wooing her for five years, Fauré had finally become engaged to Marianne Viardot, daughter of the well-known singer Pauline Viardot. The engagement lasted for less than four months, and Marianne broke it off, to Fauré's considerable distress. It was in the later stages of their relationship that he began work on the quartet, in the summer of 1876. He completed it in 1879, and revised it in 1883, completely rewriting the finale. The first performance of the original version was given on 14 February 1880. In a study dated 2008, Kathryn Koscho notes that the original finale has not survived, and is believed to have been destroyed by Fauré in his last days.

== Structure ==
The work follows the conventional layout of the genre, with four movements of roughly similar proportions. The opening movement is the longest, the second, scherzo, movement the shortest.

=== I. Allegro molto moderato ===
The first movement is in sonata form. The commentator Carl Dahlhaus refers to the "almost opulent cantabile and extreme refinement of texture" of the opening movements of both of Fauré's piano quartets. The opening theme, a vigorous melody showing the influence of Brahms, contrasts with a delicate second theme in Emajor (later in the movement it is in C major), in which the off-beats are lightly stressed, unlike the flowing first theme. The movement ends with a final statement of the opening theme.

=== II. Scherzo: Allegro vivo ===
The second movement, a playful scherzo, is one of Fauré's rare virtuoso pieces. He generally shied away from brilliant instrumental display, but the Fauré scholar Jean-Michel Nectoux comments that here, as in the First Violin Sonata, composed just before the quartet, the composer felt a brilliant scherzo necessary to preserve the balance of the whole work. The movement follows the traditional scherzo–trio–scherzo structure and consists of two contrasting principal themes in E♭ major and G minor in the scherzo sections with a third in Bmajor in the central trio section only.

=== III. Adagio ===
After the high-spirited scherzo, the slow movement has a strong air of sadness. Koscho writes, "It is striking for its unsettled, lachrymose air, which Fauré prolongs through a combination of frustrated harmonic progressions and ascending melodic fragments." It is in conventional ternary form with the main C minor melody giving way to a central theme in A major, before returning to end the movement. The critic Stephen Johnson writes that the movement gives the listener "more than a hint" of Fauré's sadness at the events of 1877, though "the emotion is always nobly restrained, with not even the slightest hint of self-indulgence."

=== IV. Allegro molto ===
The lively finale is based on two themes, the first in C minor, referring back to themes earlier in the quartet, and the second tonally ambiguous but primarily in Emajor. The two themes are brought together in C major to conclude the piece.

== Notes ==
=== Sources ===
- Dahlhaus, Carl (1989). Nineteenth Century Music. Berkeley: University of California Press. ISBN 0-520-05291-9.
- Johnson, Stephen (1986). Notes to Gabriel Fauré Piano Quartets. London: Hyperion Records. OCLC 85916721.
- Koscho, Kathryn (2008). An Analysis of Three French Piano Quartets of the 1870s (D.M.A thesis). Oklahoma: University of Oklahoma. ISBN 978-0-549-52779-4. OCLC 612042748.
- Nectoux, Jean-Michel (1991). Gabriel Fauré – A Musical Life. Translated by Roger Nichols. Cambridge: Cambridge University Press. ISBN 0-521-23524-3.
