= François-Joseph-Marie Fayolle =

François-Joseph-Marie Fayolle (15 August 1774 - 2 December 1852) was a French writer on music, who was born in Paris and is known by his articles in connection with the Biographie Universelle, having furnished the greater portion of the biographies, and by his joint authorship of Choron's Dictionary of Musicians, to which work Fétis was much indebted for information.

== Life ==
After a brilliant career at the Collège de Juilly, he entered the Corps des Ponts et Chaussées in 1792, and became chef de brigade of the École Polytechnique on its foundation in 1794. Here, under the instruction of Prony, Lagrange, and Monge, he studied higher mathematics, but without neglecting literature, and with Fontanes assistance translated a great part of the Æneid. Of his verses the following line has alone survived:

Le temps n'épargne pas ce qu'on a fait sans lui.

Though forgotten as a mathematician and a poet, Fayolle has acquired a solid reputation for his services to musical literature. He studied harmony under Perne, and the violoncello under Barni, but abstained from printing his compositions; and contented himself with publishing Les quatre Saisons du Parnasse (Paris, 1805–9), a literary collection in sixteen vols., 12mo, for which he wrote many articles on music and musicians. He also furnished the greater part of the biographical notices in the Dictionnaire historique des Musiciens, published under the names of Choron and himself (two vols. Paris, 1810–11), a work to which Fétis is much indebted. In 1813 he published Sur les drames lyriques et leur execution. He collected materials for a History of the Violin, of which, however, only fragments appeared, under the title Notices sur Corelli, Tartini, Gaviniés, Pugnani, et Viotti, extraites d'une histoire du violon (Paris, 1810). After the fall of Napoleon, Fayolle came to England, where he taught French, and wrote for the Harmonicon. On the eve of the Revolution of 1830 he returned to Paris, and resumed his old occupation as a musical critic. Among his later works may be mentioned a pamphlet called Paganini et Bériot (Paris, 1830), and the articles on musicians in the supplement to Michaud's Biographie Universelle. At the age of 78, he died on 2 December 1852, at Ste. Perrine, a house of refuge in Paris.
