= Piano Quartet No. 2 (Fauré) =

Piano quartet by Gabriel Fauré

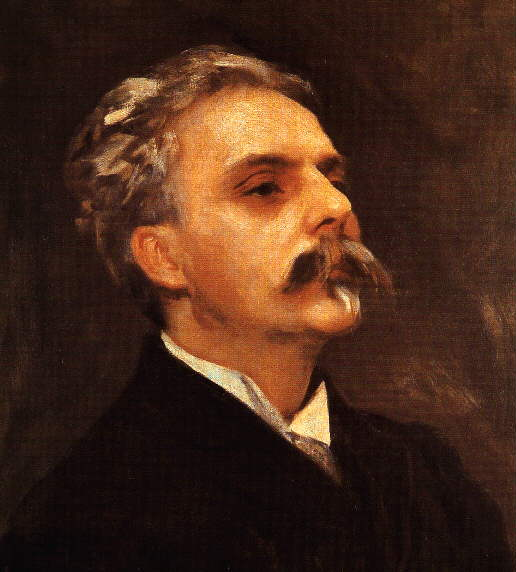
Fauré in 1889, by John Singer Sargent

Gabriel Fauré's Piano Quartet No. 2, in G minor, Op. 45, is one of the two chamber works he wrote for the conventional piano quartet combination of piano, violin, viola and cello. It was first performed in 1887, seven years after his first quartet.

== Background ==
Fauré's previous work in the genre, the Piano Quartet No. 1, Op. 15, had been favourably received at its premiere in 1880, and was among the chamber works for which he had been awarded the Prix Chartier by the Académie des Beaux-Arts in 1885. Little is known about the composer's reasons for writing another. It was not commissioned, and appears to have been written because Fauré was interested in the possibilities of the piano quartet medium, and was wary of writing chamber music with no piano part. The Fauré scholar Jean-Michel Nectoux comments that the choice of this unusual form showed the composer's desire to break new ground and be his own man. Nectoux adds that there was the advantage that the existing classical repertory contained very few top-flight piano quartets with the exception of Mozart's.

It is not certain when Fauré began work on the Second Quartet, but writers generally agree that it was in either 1885 or 1886, and the work was completed in time to be premiered on 22 January 1887. It was given at the Société Nationale de Musique by Guillaume Remy (violin), Louis van Waefelghem (viola), Jules Delsart (cello) and the composer (piano).

The piece was published soon after the first performance, with a dedication to the conductor Hans von Bülow.

== Structure ==
Fauré adopts the classical four-movement structure: an opening Allegro is followed by a scherzo, slow movement, and finale. This follows the pattern of German Romantic works such as Schumann's Piano Quartet, Op. 47 and Brahms's Piano Quartet, Op. 25.

=== I. Allegro molto moderato ===
The first movement, which is in classical sonata form, opens with a unison string melody accompanied by relentless piano figuration. The piano takes up the theme, after which the viola introduces an expressive variant of the main theme, and the violin transforms the variant into a more relaxed second subject. The exposition ends with a modified return of the opening theme and its pulsing accompaniment. Viola and cello introduce a new theme, molto tranquillamente, which provides a link into the central development section and returns, in its original form and then at double speed, towards the end of the section. The recapitulation begins with the first theme fortissimo, turns to G major with the viola melody, and the second subject returns on the cello and then the violin. The coda is primarily based on the opening theme but also reintroduces the molto tranquillamente melody now at double speed, and ends quietly in the major.

=== II. Allegro molto ===
The C minor scherzo is the shortest of the four movements. It is in a fast 6/8 metre with a syncopated piano theme. Melodic material from the first movement – first its espressivo second subject and then the main theme – is transformed into a rondo. Cross-rhythms of 3/4 in a broad string melody give way to another smooth theme which forms a kind of "trio" interlude, although the perpetuum mobile of the main scherzo material continues behind it and carries the movement on to its conclusion.

=== III. Adagio non troppo ===
The third movement, Adagio non troppo, is in E♭ major. The gentle undulating piano figure with which it opens was, according to Fauré, "a vague reverie" inspired by a memory of the evening bells of the village of Cadirac near his childhood home. The viola solo that follows is a rhythmically modified version of the second subject from the first movement, transformed into a gently oscillating siciliano. At the start of the middle section, the bell figure is played on the strings in a mixture of arco and pizzicato. The movement builds gradually to a fortissimo climax before the return of the bell motif leads the music back to pastoral quiet. At the beginning of the coda of the movement, the bell theme, given a more elaborate shape, given to the piano as an accompaniment to a cello melody. The music finishes quietly in the home key of E♭ major. Nectoux says of this movement, "The sense of space it creates, rapt and profound within a narrow range of notes, marks it out as being truly the music of silence".

=== IV. Finale: Allegro molto ===
The critic Stephen Johnson says of this movement, "Passion and violence are again let loose … The relentless forward drive of this movement is quite unlike anything else in Fauré". The movement sets off in fast triple time, with an insistent rising string melody together with piano triplets. The second subject, derived from the molto tranquillamente theme of the first movement, is a vigorous theme reminiscent of a waltz. It is succeeded by a melody for viola and cello related to the trio section of the scherzo. After a development and recapitulation, there is a coda in which thematic elements from the entire quartet are glimpsed. The work ends in an emphatic G major.

== Critical reputation ==
The musicologist Robert Orledge comments in his 1979 biography of Fauré that the Second Piano Quartet "marks a significant advance on the First Quartet in the force of its expression, the greater rhythmic drive and complexity of its themes, and its deliberately unified conception". Orledge adds that in this work "Faure announces his full artistic maturity and the beginning of his second period". Nectoux expresses reservations about the finale, finding the second theme "rather on the heavy side" and a later section "unusually for Fauré, lacking in imagination". Aaron Copland wrote that the Second Quartet shows the composer "less carefree, less happy, more serious, more profound" than in the First. To Copland the adagio was "the crowning movement of the quartet". He described it in a 1924 essay, as "a long sigh of infinite tenderness, a long moment of quiet melancholy and nostalgic charm. Its beauty is a truly classic one if we define classicism as 'intensity on a background of calm'."
