= Louis Niedermeyer =

Swiss and naturalized French composer

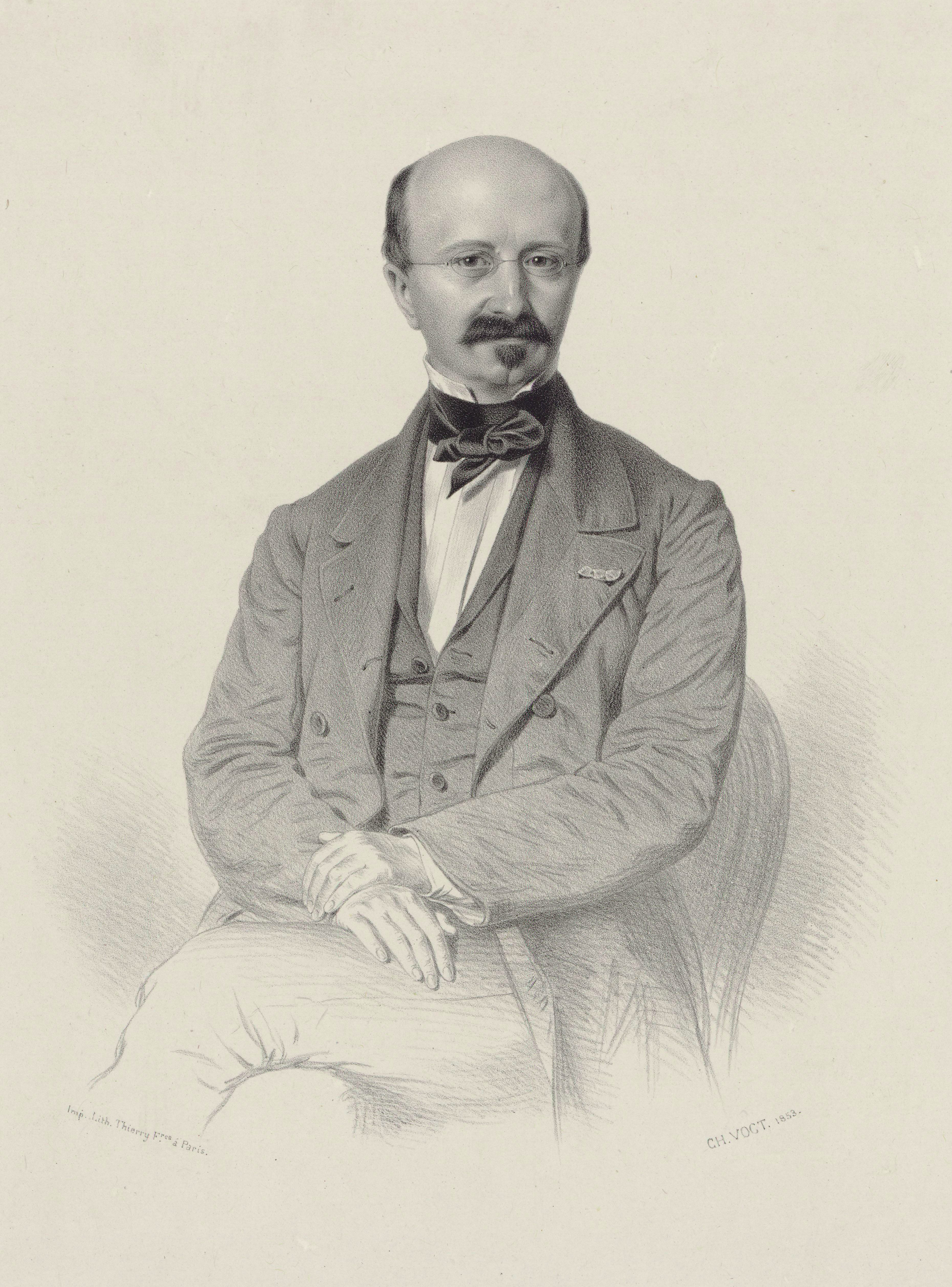
Niedermeyer, ca. 1850

Abraham Louis Niedermeyer (27 April 1802 – 14 March 1861) was a Swiss and naturalized French composer.

He chiefly wrote church music and a few operas. He also taught music and took over the École Choron, renamed École Niedermeyer de Paris, a school for the study and practice of church music, with students that include several eminent French musicians such as Gabriel Fauré and André Messager.

== Life and career ==
Niedermeyer was born in Nyon in 1802. His father was a music teacher from Würzburg, Germany, who had settled in Switzerland after his marriage. When Louis reached the age of 15, his father sent him to Vienna to learn music. There, he studied piano with Ignaz Moscheles and composition with Emanuel Aloys Förster.

He then studied in Rome with Vincenzo Fioravanti, the choirmaster of the papal Chapel (1819) and in Naples with Niccolò Antonio Zingarelli.

While in Rome, he met Gioachino Rossini, who befriended him and encouraged him to write operas. His first opera, Il reo per amore (Guilty for Love), premiered at the Teatro del Fondo in Naples in 1820 and encountered some success. After his studies, he came back to Switzerland and composed Le Lac.

=== Le lac (1820) ===
In 1820, Niedermeyer composed Le Lac, a musical adaptation one of Lamartine's most famous poems of the same name. Adapting a poem that was considered one of the jewels of French Romantic poetry was a difficult task and Niedermeyer earned praise from Lamartine himself:

A thousand attempts have been made to add a plaintive melody to the pain expressed in these stanzas. Only one composer succeeded: Niedermeyer translated this ode into notes in a touching way. I heard this romance and I saw the tears it brought forth.

Saint-Saëns credits Niedermeyer for bringing an important evolution to the genre:

Niedermeyer was above all a precursor in writing Le Lac ... he created a new genre, of a superior art, analogous to the German Lied, and the resounding success of this work paved the way for Charles Gounod and all those who followed his lead."

=== Collaboration with Rossini ===
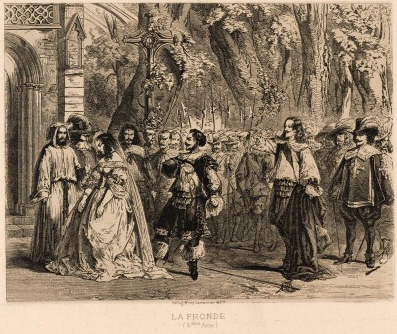
Scene from the 4th act of La Fronde

Like Rossini, Niedermeyer settled in Paris (at the age of 21, in 1823). Encouraged by the Italian composer, he continued composing operas but never encountered success.

His second opera, La casa nel bosco (The House in the Woods) premiered in 1828. While François-Joseph Fétis praised it, the critique was mixed and La casa nel bosco went largely unnoticed. Disappointed, Niedermeyer moved to Brussels where he lived for 18 months and started teaching music.

He came back to Paris and composed his third opera, Stradella with a libretto written by Emile Deschamps and Emilien Pascini. It premiered on 3 March 1837 and was lauded by critics.

He later composed Marie Stuart (on a libretto written by Theodore Anne) which premiered at the Théâtre de l'Académie Royale de Musique in Paris on 6 December 1844.

After Marie Stuart, Niedermeyer moved to Bologna to collaborate with his friend Rossini on the assembly of Robert Bruce (1846), Rossini's third and last pastiche; Niedermeyer "provided the all-important French texts with their characteristic tone color and harmonies".

His last opera, La Fronde (about The Fronde), premiered on 2 May 1853 and was unsuccessful.

François-Joseph Fétis writes:

La Fronde was received coldly and there were only a few performances. It was Niedermeyer's last attempt in his dramatic career. After this final disappointment, he focused on realizing a project he had had for some time, and restore the church music institution that had been founded by Choron, and devote himself to it as Choron had before him.

=== Religious music and teaching career ===
In the last decades of his life, Niedermeyer gradually abandoned his operatic career and devoted himself primarily to sacred and secular vocal music.

As early as 1840, Niedermeyer and his friend, Prince de la Moskowa, had supported a revival of Baroque and Renaissance music and the rediscovery of composers such as Palestrina, Lassus or Victoria. Together, they established the Société des Concerts de Musique Vocale, religieuse et Classique.

In this capacity, Niedermeyer had a strong influence in the revival of religious music in France:

The name Niedermeyer is indissolubly linked with the renaissance of religious music in France. Church choirs had almost entirely disappeared during the 1789 Revolution. Their subsequent revival had been hampered by the confiscation of clerical property and that of the émigré nobility who had supported them in the past ... Despite these unfavourable circumstances, Louis Niedermeyer founded a Society of Vocal and Religious Music in 1840, with the help of his 'pupil' Prince de la Moskowa.

This society performed sixteenth- and seventeenth-century works, and from 1843 these were published in an eleven-volume anthology.

The details of these performance did not, understandably, conform all that closely to modern musicological practice, containing as they did tempo indications (generally slow), dynamic markings and so-called 'corrections' of the harmony. Even so we must acknowledge Niedermeyer as a pioneer of polyphonic music in France, fifty years before the famous performances of the Chanteurs de St-Gervais, conducted by Charles Bordes and so much admired by Debussy.

In 1846, Niedermeyer was awarded the Ordre national de la Légion d'Honneur for his efforts, on the recommendation of Prince de la Moskowa.

In October 1853, Niedermeyer reorganized and re-opened the school then known as the École Choron (named after Alexandre-Étienne Choron, who died in 1834). It was later renamed the École Niedermeyer de Paris and remains opened to this day.

Several major composers received their musical training from the École Niedermeyer:

His École de Musique Religieuse, known as École Niedermeyer, was a boarding school for boys. Its purpose was to train organists and choristers in an attempt to raise the standard of church music in France, and its success can be measured by the reputations of some of the musicians who received their training there: Gabriel Fauré, Eugène Gigout, Albert Périlhou and André Messager.

In 1857, Niedermeyer published a treatise on plainchant (1857) and founded La Maitrise, a journal that presented writings about and examples of early church music.

Shortly before his death, he published a manual for the use of organs in church music, Accompagnement pour Orgues des Offices de l'Église.

He died in Paris in 1861.
