= Albert Périlhou =

French composer, organist and pianist

Albert Jacques Périlhou (2 April 1846 – 28 August 1936) was a French composer, organist, and pianist.

== Biography ==
Born in Daumazan-sur-Arize on 2 April 1846, he was the only son of Jean-Justin Périlhou (born 1820 in Laroque-d'Olmes), an organist in Pézenas, and couturière Marie-Jeanne Balbine Carrière (born 1827 in Daumazan-sur-Arize) and received further instruction as an organist under Camille Saint-Saëns at the Niedermeyer school.

After some time passed in which he became an organist and a piano teacher in Saint-Étienne, he became professor of piano at the Conservatoire de Lyon (1883). He later moved to Paris in 1888 as an artistic advisor of maison Erard, he became organist of Saint-Séverin (1889) at the new instrument rebuilt by John Abbey, and then auditioned for and was granted the position of titular organist of Saint-Eustache in 1905, resigned the following year. In 1910 he was named director of the Niedermeyer school.

Périlhou was a prolific composer who wrote a large body of music for piano, organ, orchestra and voice. He retired in 1914 to Tain-l'Hermitage, where he died at the age of 90 on 28 August 1936. Probably following the example of his teacher and friend Saint-Saëns, he lived for some time in Algeria.

His wife Jeanne Petit (born 4 February 1858 in Sens), who he married on 8 July 1879 in her hometown, died on 1 September in Tournon-sur-Rhône in the year following his death. They had a son, Louis.

Périlhou and his wife are buried in Peaugres.

== Works ==
Louis Vierne called him "a composer of the 18th century". Recognised as a great improviser, he strove for the colors of the instrument's tone more than tricks of the genre. He preferred delicacy and accessibility over esoteric classical styles.

His work stretches across different artistries, allowing for flexible inclusion in different scenarios.

- Livre d’orgue. Simples pieces composed specially for "le service ordinaire" in seven books (Heugel, 1899–1905) :
  - 1st book : 7 preludes and 3 transcriptions (J.S. Bach and J. Massenet)
  - 2nd book : 7 pieces, preludes and etudes and 3 transcriptions (R. Schumann and J.S. Bach)
  - 3rd book : 7 pieces, Prélude et Marche, and 3 transcriptions (F. Mendelssohn and J.S. Bach)
  - 4th book : 7 pieces, Prélude, Cloches, and 3 transcriptions (Th. Arne and J.S. Bach)
  - 5th book : 3 church pieces (Le Cloître, Noël, Le jour des morts au Mont-Saint-Michel), 3 Impromptus (for home organ), 2 Preludes and 3 Fugues from the Well-Tempered Clavier by J.S. Bach
  - 6th book : 6 Noëls, O salutaris, Adoremus, Andantino, Le Glas, 2 Handel transcriptions
  - 7th book : 6 pieces, Impressions (Saint-Sernin de Toulouse basilica), Épithalame, Lamento, Barcarolle (for home organ), Nox (without pedal).
- Ballade for flute or violin, accompanied by piano.
- Chanson de Guillot Martin, arranged for harp by Marcel Grandjany
- Fantaisie pour 2 pianos
- La Primavera: Chanson vénitienne de Reynaldo Hahn, Paraphrase for piano on the song by Reynaldo Hahn
- String quartet
- String quintet
- Concerto for flute and orchestra
- Symphonic works : Scènes gothiques, Scènes d’après le folklore des provinces de France, Une veillée en Bresse, Une fête patronale en Velay.
