= Gustave Lefèvre =

French composer and music educator

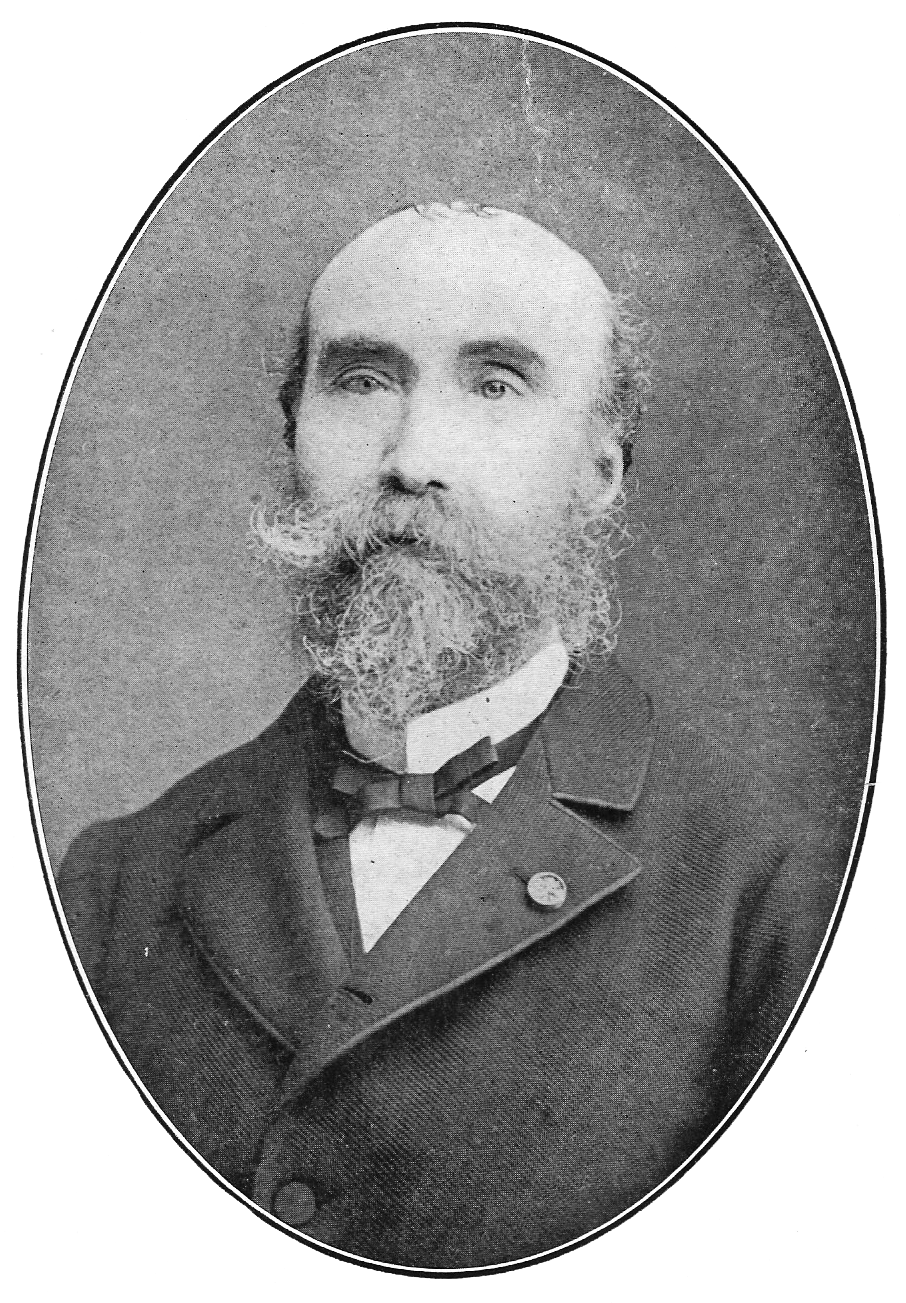
Gustave Lefèvre by Berthaud in 1889

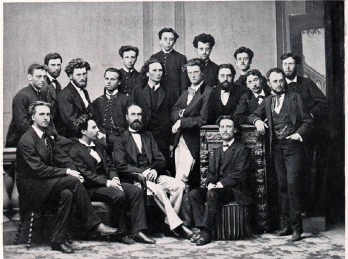
Gustave Lefèvre (center) surrounded by students of the École Niedermeyer including Gigout, Fauré and Messager, Bibliothèque nationale de France

Victor Gustave Lefèvre (2 June 1831 in Provins – 17 March 1910 in his home in Boulogne-Billancourt) was a French composer and music educator.

== Publications ==
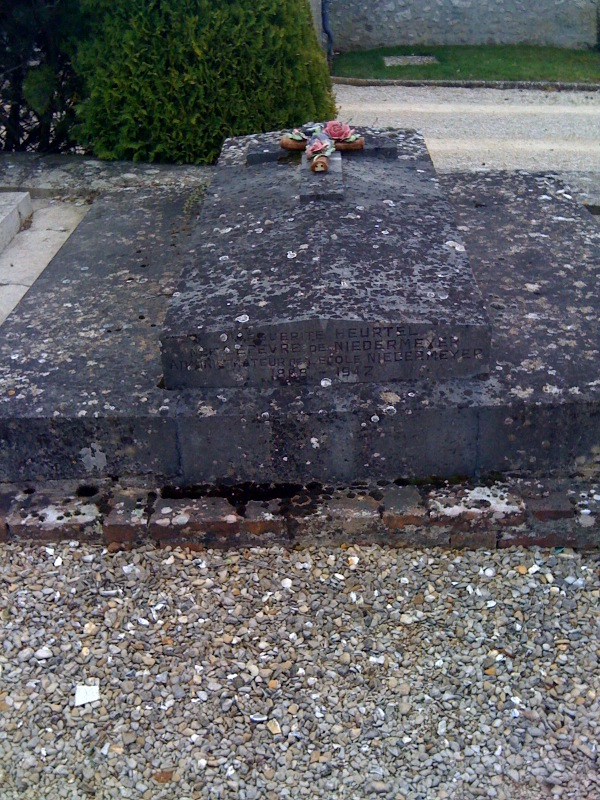
Gustave Lefèvre's grave at Provins cemetery

- Traité de contrepoint et du rythme (unpublished),
- Traité d'harmonie (1889). In 1900 he founded La Nouvelle Maîtrise, a revival of the magazine formerly founded by Louis Niedermeyer.
- Writing of the article about the Niedermeyer School of Classical Music for l'encyclopédie de la musique and the Dictionnaire du Conservatoire, by Albert Lavignac and Lionel de La Laurencie.

== Bibliography ==
- Dictionnaire de la musique en France au XIXe under the guidance of Joël-Marie Fauquet (Fayard)
- L'École Niedermeyer, sa création, son but, son développement by Maurice Galerne (Éditions Margueritat)
- Dictionnaire national des contemporains Tome II, by C.E. Curinier, Paris (Office général d'édition)
- Dossier Niedermeyer Rés. Dos 19, BNF
- Documents légués à la ville de Provins Fonds ancien de la Ville de Provins
