= Eugène Gigout =

French organist and composer (1844–1925)

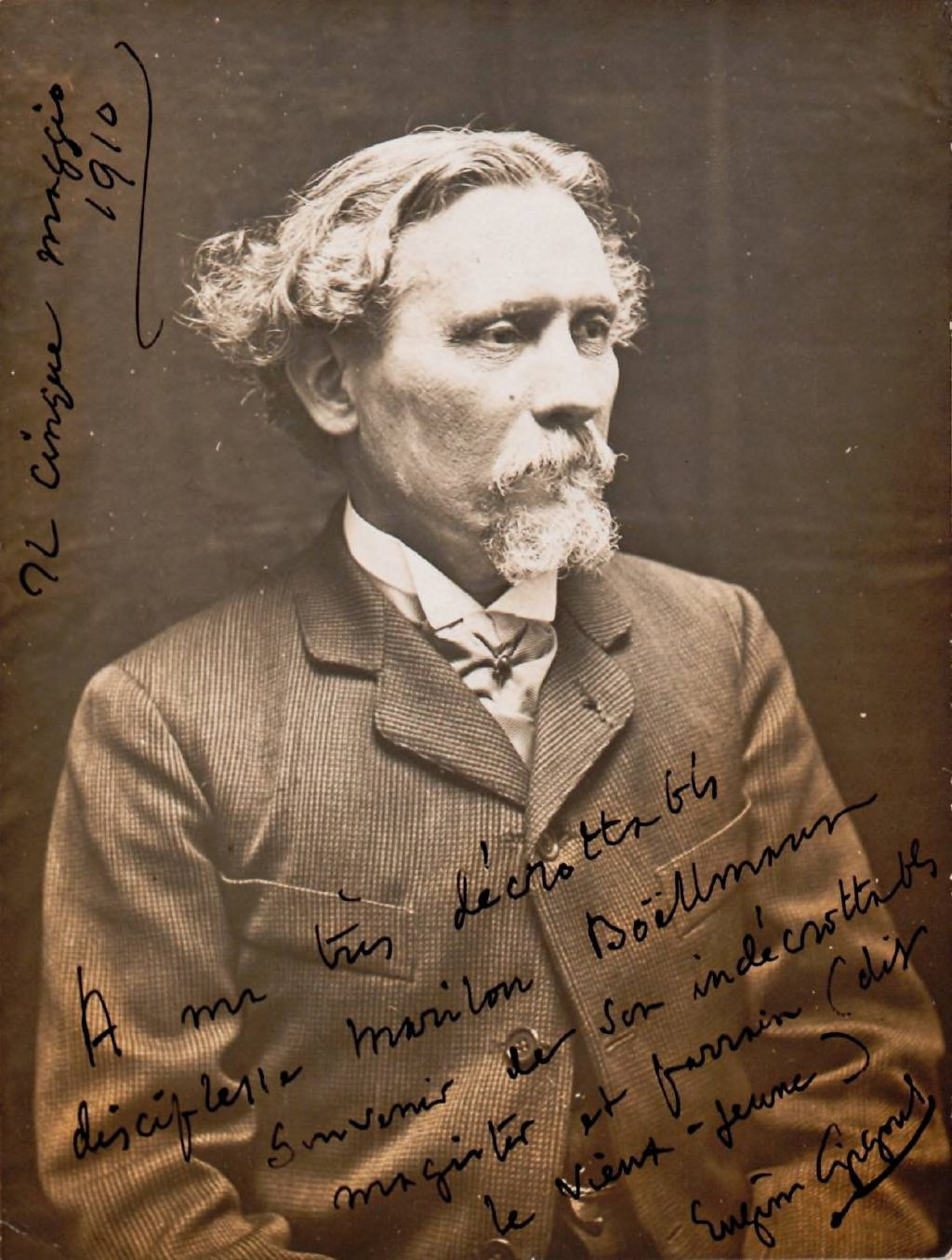
- Gigout in 1910
- Born: 23 March 1844; Nancy, Grand Est, France
- Died: 9 December 1925 (aged 81); Paris, France
- Occupations: Organist; composer
- Employer: Saint-Augustin Church
- Notable work: 10 pièces pour orgue: Toccata in B minor (1890)

Eugène Gigout (French: [ʒiɡu]; 23 March 1844 – 9 December 1925) was a French organist and a composer, mostly of music for his own instrument.

== Biography ==
Gigout was born in Nancy, and died in Paris. A pupil of Camille Saint-Saëns, he served as the organist of the French capital's Saint-Augustin Church for 62 years. He became widely known as a teacher and his output as a composer was considerable. Renowned as an expert improviser, he also founded his own music school. His nephew by marriage was Léon Boëllmann, another distinguished French composer and organist.

The 10 pièces pour orgue (composed in 1890) include the Toccata in B minor, Gigout's best-known creation, which turns up as a frequent encore at organ recitals. Also fairly often played, and to be found in the same collection, is a Scherzo in E major. Other notable pieces by Gigout are Grand chœur dialogué (1881) and Marche religieuse. Gigout's works are now available on several commercial recordings.

His pupils included his nephew Boëllmann, Victoria Cartier, André Fleury, Henri Gagnon, André Marchal, André Messager and Albert Roussel.

== Selected compositions ==
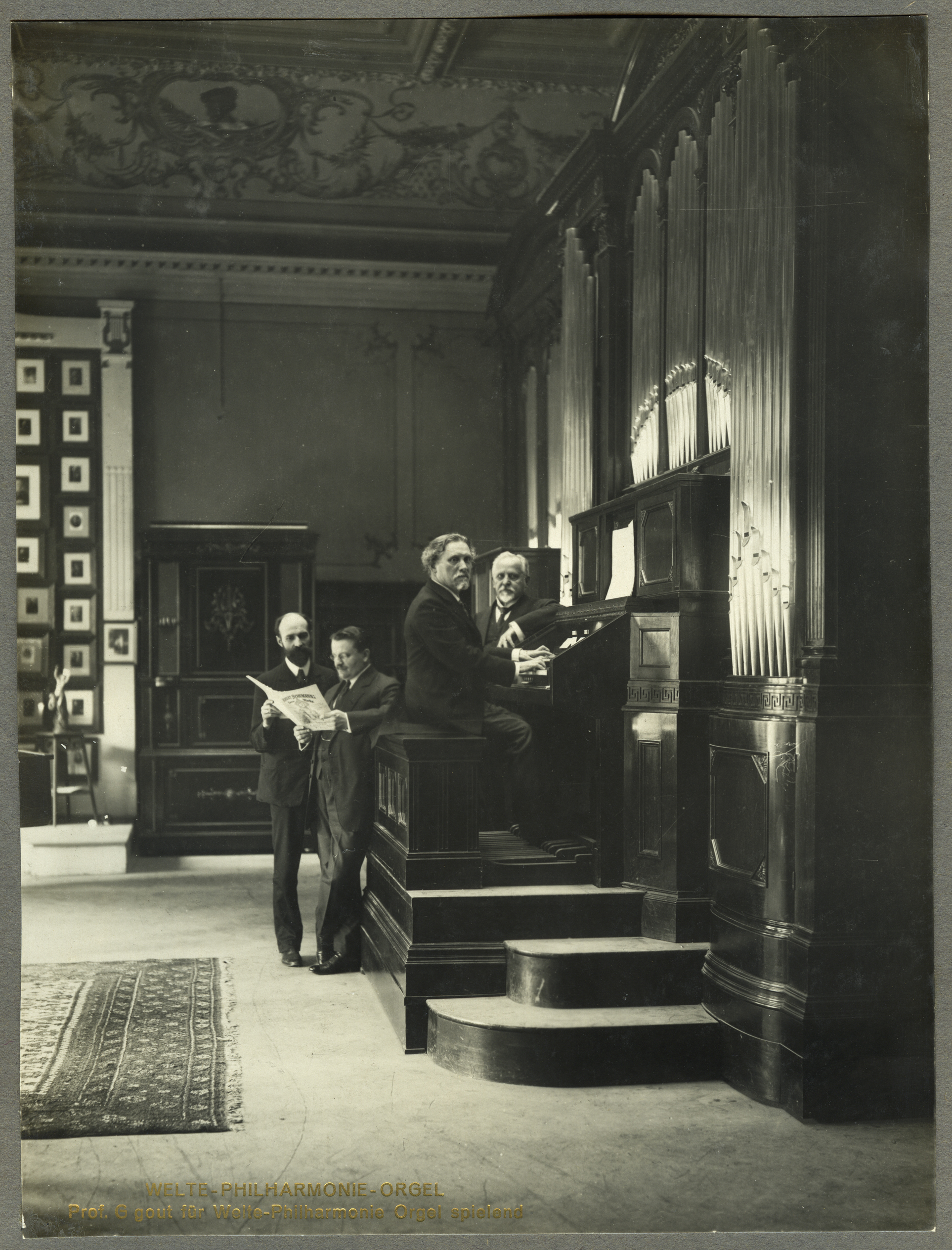
Recording session with Gigout for the Welte-Philharmonic-Organ, 1912

=== Organ ===
- Six Pièces (1872, 1876, 1885)
- Trois Morceaux (1888)
- Cent Pièces brèves (1889)
- Dix Pièces (1889)
- Album grégorien, 2 volumes (1895)
- Trois Pièces (1896)
- Prélude et fugue (1897)
- Rapsodie sur des airs populaires du Canada (1898)
- L'Orgue d'église (1902)
- Poèmes mystiques (1903)
- Interludium (1906)
- 70 Pièces (1911)
- Nouveau recueil de douze pièces (1912)
- Pièce jubilaire (1918)
- Cent Pièces nouvelles (1922)
- Dix Pièces (1923)
- Deux Pièces (1923)

=== Piano ===
- Staccato-Étude; Rêverie; Bagatelle (all 1868)
- Pièce symphonique; Caprice-Ballet; Fantaisie scolastique (all for piano 4-hands, 1879)
- Quatre Pièces (1886)
- Hymne à la France (1892)
- Sonata (1904)
- Trois Improvisations caractéristiques (1912)
- Aux escaldes (1926)
