= Op. 106 =

In music, Op. 106 stands for Opus number 106. Compositions that are assigned this number include:

- Beethoven – Piano Sonata No. 29
- Dvořák – String Quartet No. 13
- Fauré – Le jardin clos
- Reger – Der 100. Psalm
- Schubert – An Sylvia
- Schumann – Declamation with piano, "Schön Hedwig"
