= Paul Fort =

French poet (1872–1960)

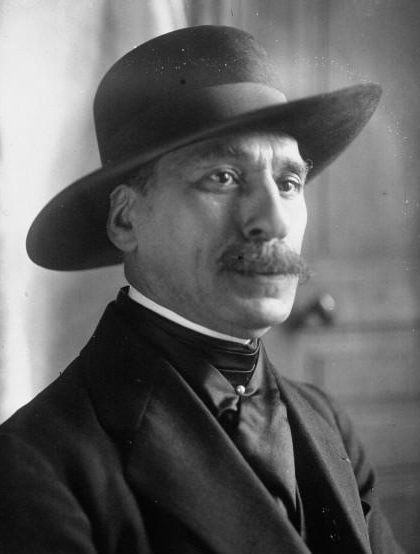
- Born: 1 February 1872; Reims, France
- Died: 20 April 1960 (aged 88); Montlhéry, France
- Education: Lycée Louis-le-Grand
- Occupations: Lecturer, poet, playwright
- Writing career
- Notable work: "La Ronde"
- Notable awards: Prix Lasserre (1936); Grand Prix de Littérature (1956); Chevalier, French Légion d'Honneur
- Literary movement: Symbolism, Futurism

Jules-Jean-Paul Fort (1 February 1872 – 20 April 1960) was a French poet associated with the Symbolist movement. At the age of 18, reacting against the Naturalistic theatre, Fort founded the Théâtre d'Art (1890–93). He also founded and edited the literary reviews Livre d'Art with Alfred Jarry and Vers et Prose (1905–14) with poet Guillaume Apollinaire, which published the work of Paul Valéry and other important Symbolist writers. Fort is notable for his enormous volume of poetry, having published more than thirty volumes of ballads and, according to Amy Lowell, for creating the polyphonic prose form in his 'Ballades francaises'.

== Life and career ==
Paul Fort was born in Reims, Marne département, France in 1872. His father, an insurance agent, moved the family to Paris in 1878. While attending secondary school at the Lycée Louis-le-Grand, he became a noted part of the artistic community of Montparnasse. He sought out the company of avant-garde artists and befriended André Gide and Pierre Louÿs. His work in the independent theatre movement spanned 1890 through 1892. Fort then devoted himself to poetry, publication, and advancing new writers. By 1912, his accomplishments and influence were such that he was given the title "Prince of the Poets" (honorific title given in France to poets, such as Verlaine and Mallarmé, after the death of their predecessor).

One of his works, "La Ronde", has become famous worldwide as a plea for world friendship.

Fort died on 20 April 1960, in Montlhéry, a suburb south of Paris where he had lived since 1921, and is buried in the Cimetière de Montlhéry.

== Theater experience ==
At 17, Fort frequented the Left Bank hangout of the Symbolist poets, the Café Voltaire (1, Place de l'Odéon), where the discussion included contemporary theatre. His activity there would soon cause his expulsion from high school. The group aimed to break with the reigning Naturalistic scene, including the Théâtre Libre created in 1887 by André Antoine, even though Fort admired Antoine and hoped to create a new theatre that would bring together the best of all theater forms, including naturalistic drama. Indeed, the theater Fort founded, The Mixed Theater (Le Théâtre Mixte), which debuted on 23 June 1890, announced an eclectic program of varying styles in both new works and long forgotten plays. Combining forces with Louis Germain's Idealist Theatre (Le Théâtre Idéaliste), they presented four more plays on 5 and 12 October. These inaugural works included not only efforts by Fort and Germain but also Marc Legrand, le Sr de Chanmêlé, Charles Grandmougin, and Joseph Gayda. The critics, however, failed to find the plays in either program artistically revolutionary. Fort and Germain parted ways, leaving Fort to rename his company The Art Theatre (Le Théâtre d'Art) and to set up an office at 155, rue Montmartre.

Fort's two theatre ventures never had a single theatre home; instead, their programs circulated among eight rental performance spaces, mostly on the Right Bank. He engaged the leading Symbolist painters of the era to design and paint the sets and backdrops, particularly the "Prophets" of the Nabis group (Paul Sérusier, Emile Bernard, Maurice Denis, Paul Bonnard, Paul Ranson, Eduard Vuillard, and Henry Gabriel Ibels). Fort had appeared as an actor in the June program; Germain, the October. But an important discovery also debuted in the second program: Georgette Camée (d. 1957), a Paris Conservatory student, who became a seminal actor in the nascent avant-garde theatre movement, and would appear in 22 plays with the Théâtre d'Art. Among her rôles was Mephistopheles—a dandy with a monocle and in a smoking jacket—in their 1892 French adaptation of Christopher Marlowe's Doctor Faustus. Although she won admiration as Geneviève in Pelléas et Mélisande, the 1893 opening event of the new Théâtre de l'Œuvre, it would be her only performance for the venture. She earned further acclaim in 1894 as Sara in the long-awaited stage presentation of Auguste de Villiers de L'Isle-Adam's 1890 Symbolist drama Axël. She eventually married writer Maurice Pottecher and joined him in his own regional theatre endeavor, the Théâtre du Peuple, in Bussang, France.

A former actor for Antoine's Théâtre Libre, Aurélien Lugné-Poe, who had returned from an abbreviated military service, joined the Théâtre d'Art in spring 1891, first appearing in Maurice Maeterlinck's L'Intruse. For the next two years, he moved regularly between acting for the Théâtre d'Art and directing for the amateur company Le Cercle des Escholiers. Lugné-Poe performed in ten plays altogether for Fort, interpreting, most notably, the Maeterlinck rôles of the Old Man in L'Intruse (1891) and the First Blind Man in Les Aveugles (1891), as well as Satan in Jules Bois' Les Noces de Sathan (1892). He, along with Georgette Camée, forged the signature Symbolist acting style that conveys a religious reverie, with its hieratic poses and gestures, matched with solemn, psalmodized line readings.

Under the two and a half years of Fort's leadership, the Théâtre d'Art presented poetry recitations, older, little-seen dramatic work by Marlowe, Shelley, and Hugo, as well as new plays by Rachilde (La Voix du Sang, 1890; Madame la Mort, 1891), Théodore de Banville (Phyllis, 1891), Catulle Mendès (Le Soleil de Minuit, 1891), Paul Verlaine (Les Uns et les Autres, 1891), Remy de Gourmont (Théodat, 1891), and especially Maurice Maeterlinck (L'Intruse and Les Aveugles, both 1891) and Charles van Lerberghe's Les Flaireurs (1892). As an artistic director, however, he proved himself ambitious but in over his head; he was often over budget, unable to deal with his creditors, and straining technically to produce difficult, opaque dramatic material. By 1892, with the Parisian critics begging him to make better choices, Fort sought in vain to produce Villiers de L'Isle-Adam's Axël as the way to reinstate the company's reputation. When it fell through, he tried to shepherd the Paris premiere of Maeterlinck's Pelléas et Mélisande for March 1893, but Maeterlinck and co-producer Tola Dorian appear to have lost faith in him and the production was abruptly cancelled. This defeat prompted Fort to give up control of the enterprise altogether and turn his focus to poetry. Lugné-Poe took over the Pelléas and Mélisande project for its premiere in May 1893, which became the first step in launching his own Théâtre de l'Œuvre. In a relatively short time, the Théâtre d'Art had made its mark in the burgeoning avant-garde European theatre. As theatre historian Jacques Robichez has concluded, "In brief, the history of the Théâtre d'Art is that of a failed but fertile experiment, and its principal—and perhaps only—merit is having engendered the Théâtre de l'Œuvre."

== Poet ==
=== Post-war creation ===
Following the theatrical adventure he had achieved, he dedicated his life to poetry. He gave his first poems to the Mercure de France in 1896. Those poems consisted the debut of the Ballades françaises (17 volumes written entering 1922 and 1958). He begins to publish into the Le Livre d'art magazine in 1892 where it was relaunched in 1896 with Maurice Dumont. With the latter, he edited L'épreuve, Journal-Album d'art in 1894.

By 1903 he organized and held Tuesday poetic lectures at the Closerie des Lilas. In 1905, he began publishing the magazine Vers et prose with Moréas and Salmon, who notably edited the works Guillaume Apollinaire, Max Jacob, Pierre Louÿs. He edited it together with Paul Valéry. Pierre Louÿs, who wrote the prelude to the first volume of the Ballades, defines them as small poems in polymorphous form or in familiar alexandrins, but which bend towards the normal prose form, requiring the rules of rhythmic prose rather than those of verse diction.

Given the title “commandeur de la Légion d'honneur”, he helped to give the quartier du Montparnasse in Paris its artistic reputation. A poll of five literary magazines (Gil Blas, Comoedia, La Phalange, Les Loups and Les Nouvelles) gave him the title "Prince of Poets" in 1912. Then, 350 authors voted him as the true heir to Verlaine, Mallarmé and Léon Dierx.

In August 1913, his sixteen-year-old daughter Jeanne married futurist painter Gino Severini. Fort lead the ceremonies, Severini had as witnesses Guillaume Apollinaire, and Filippo Marinetti, the author of the Futurist Manifesto. Apollinaire wrote to Madeleine Pagès two years later: “I received the idiotic lyrical report of Paul Fort, the highfalutin prince of poets, who sings to battles in far away lands in a truly foolish language.”

== Poet Laureate of the Third Republic ==
Paul Fort was a leading jury member of the Prix Jeunesse that was created in 1934. Running in 1943 for the Académie Goncourt seat left vacant by the death of Pierre Champion a year earlier, Fort lost to André Billy, though Billy was confirmed to the seat only after the Libération.

His work was banned by the CNE (National Writers' Committee of the intellectual resistance) at the end of war, but the interdiction was rescinded in a second list published in the Les Lettres françaises of 21 October 1944.

But he officially recovered when introducing an exhibition dedicated to him in 1954 at the Reims Carnegie Library.

In 1956, Paul married Germaine Pouget. His nephew married the daughter of Alfred Vallette (1858–1935), director of Mercure de France, and Marguerite Eymery (1860–1953), who wrote under the nom de plume Rachilde.

Paul Fort was buried at Montlhery on his own property, called Argenlieu.

== Legacy ==
Fort is mentioned by Ernest Hemingway as a customer of La Closerie des Lilas, in A Moveable Feast.

Dutch composer Marjo Tal set several of Fort's works to music, as did British composer Eva Ruth Spalding and French composers Beatrice Siegrist, Gabriel Pierné and André Caplet.

Fort is mentioned in The Diary of Anaïs Nin, in the entry for October 1936 where Nin recounts the evening when they met at a party.
