= Charles van Lerberghe =

Belgian poet and playwright (1861–1907)

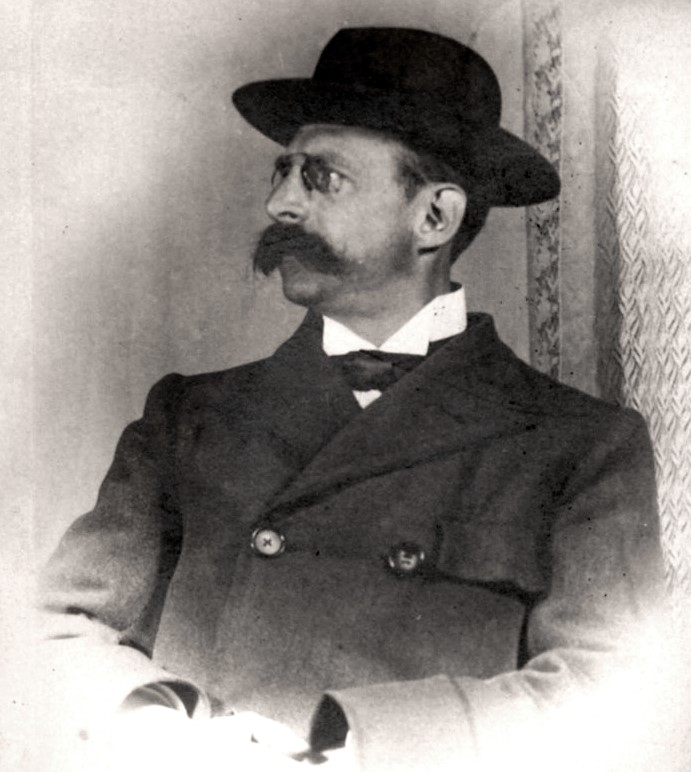
Charles van Lerberghe's photo portrait for Entrevisions, 1898

Charles van Lerberghe (21 October 1861 – 26 October 1907) was a Belgian author who wrote in French and was particularly identified with the Symbolist movement. The growing atheism and anticlerical stance evident in his later work made it popular among those who challenged establishment norms at the start of the 20th century.

== Life ==
Charles van Lerberghe was born to a Flemish father and Walloon mother living in easy circumstances in Ghent. His father, also named Charles, died when the boy was seven and his mother when he was ten. Placed under the guardianship of an uncle of Maurice Maeterlinck, he then attended the Jesuit Collège Ste-Barbe in Ghent, along with the future poets Maeterlinck and Grégoire le Roy (1862–1941). Later he studied for a D.Phil in Brussels, which he gained in 1894. He was also participating with his friends in the magazines encouraging the new literary movement in Belgium and was discussed by Georges Rodenbach in his long article Trois poètes nouveaux, published in 1886, long before Lerberghe's first poetry collection appeared. Once that collection was published as Entrevisions in 1898, van Lerberghe travelled abroad to London, Berlin, Munich and Rome. On his return he went to live in the Ardennes town of Bouillon, where he planned his unified work La Chanson d'Ève, published in 1904. Two years later he had just completed his satirical comedy Pan and was working on new poems when he suffered a stroke, from the effects of which he was eventually to die. In 1907 he was buried in the Brussels cemetery of Evere.

== Work ==
Van Lerberghe's creative work consisted of poetry, drama and short stories. The last of these were chiefly imaginative fantasies and appeared in various magazines between 1889 and 1906. Some had a limited posthumous reprinting in 1931 as Contes hors du temps (Tales outside time) and eleven were republished in 1992 under the same title. Their author typified them in a letter to his regular correspondent, fr:Fernand Severin, as "symbolo-humoristico-philosophical stories" and considered them the product of the Flemish side of his imaginative life. There too they were fructified by an "English" love of the unexpected, the strange and the grotesque.

The first of his plays was equally fantastic, establishing the new genre of 'the theatre of anguish' (théâtre de l'angoisse), of which the chief exponent in Belgium was to be Maeterlinck. The subject of Les Flaireurs (The Trackers) represents the death of an old peasant woman, who is accompanied only by a child in a remote cottage on a stormy night, as unknown presences batter on the door. The work closely anticipated Maeterlinck's L’Intruse both in theme and style. Both plays were printed in 1890, but van Lerberghe's was not staged in Brussels until 1892. It also had a Paris production by Paul Fort that year and another in 1896 by Lugné-Poe. Later it was acted in the Netherlands and Germany. There were two translations into English, where it was titled "The Night-comers" by William Sharp and as "The Vultures" in the adaptation for performance by Jocelyn Godefroi in 1913. There were also translations into Czech, German, and Italian.

One of van Lerberghe's earliest ventures in verse also had a dramatic form. This was the long-lined soliloquy "Solayne", which came punctuated with such prose stage directions as: "While She speaks, the sky gradually dims and clouds resembling dark storm-tossed vessels pass over - and flights of owls." The first fragment appeared in Parnasse de la Jeune Belgique in 1887, followed by a prior fragment of the work in the Symbolist magazine La Pléiade (Brussels, 1890). After reconstructing as far as possible the intended long poem from van Lerberghe's notebooks, Robert Goffin published it in 1939 under the title Solyane, un chef d’oeuvre oublié (a forgotten masterpiece). Its subject was the fall from grace of the female angel of the Evening Star through giving preference to her sensual nature. In his introduction, Goffin described the poem's similar leaning towards the obscurity and complexity of Stéphane Mallarmé's poetic soliloquies, "Hérodiade" and "L'après-midi d'un faune", and its anticipation of La Jeune Parque, Paul Valéry's Symbolist masterwork in the same form, published a decade after van Lerberghe's death.

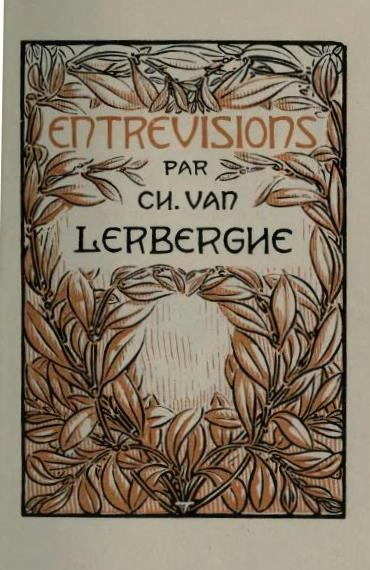
The woodcut frontispiece designed by Eugène Vibert for the 1923 reprint of Entrevisions

It was not until 1898 that van Lerberghe collected together the poems he had been publishing over the past decade in La Wallonie, La Jeune Belgique and other literary magazines of a Symbolist tendency. The title he gave the collection was Entrevisions (Glimpses), a coinage based on similar expressions in French. British contemporaries were to see reciprocal influences in his work. William Sharp was struck by "a marked rapprochement to Rossetti and to a certain extent to Poe". His translator Jethro Bithell considered that his imagery was "directly inspired by Rossetti and Burne-Jones". Behind such painters was also the example of the early Italians who had inspired them, in particular Sandro Botticelli. The tumbling golden locks about the faces of his Madonnas and the artistic presentation of his Venus, for example, are reproduced in such passages as

Round are my mouth, my bosom, and
By grape or goblet may be spanned.

I have crowned with roses round
My hair, long, golden and unbound.

The lyrics of Entrevisions are simple in form and language, but have a limited range of effects. Theirs is a pure poetry that owes nothing to rhetoric, everything to imaginative ingenuity. There, in the words of Fernand Séverin, "all is allusive, suggestive, fugitive impression, [making of the collection] one of the foremost examples of Symbolist poetry". Aesthetically, the poet was indebted to Henri Bergson's philosophical theory of duration, whose description of the existential state of impermanence inspired van Lerberghe to cultivate his vision of transient beauty. Maeterlinck was more sceptical in this instance, dismissing the unspecific vagueness and insipidity of the writing as abus d'eau de rose (so much rose water).

Though van Lerberghe's next collection, Chanson d'Ève (1904), was programmatically planned, stylistically the poetry is much the same. "The lyrics are subjective and impressionistic…Image succeeds image: one is not sure exactly what the poet is talking about, but the enchantment is there." After a liminal "Prelude", the four sections into which the remaining 94 poems are divided are titled "First Words" (Premières paroles), "Temptation" (Tentation), "Transgression" (Faute) and "Twilight" (Crépuscule), through which Eve is followed from her innocent awakening in the Garden of Eden through her growth into mortal consciousness. Van Lerberghe's approach to the journey of his cosmic and pantheistic Eve is sympathetic and supportive, for by this time he was in reaction to Catholic doctrine and counted himself a disciple of Darwin. At the end, the guiltless song of Eve falls silent as she is reabsorbed into the universe from which she first emerged into individuality.

Van Lerberghe's anticlericalism was carried over into the prose of his three-act satirical comedy Pan, published in February 1906 by Mercure de France, which celebrates the triumph of its protagonist's joyous paganism. The play, which has also been characterised as "half drama, half pantomime", was first given a Parisian production by Lugné-Poe in 1906, in which Colette was reported to have danced naked; and later that year it was performed in Brussels. Later it went on to achieve some success in Eastern Europe. There was a translation by S.A. Polyakov in 1908 in the Russian symbolist magazine, Vesy, followed by another into Ukrainian by Maksym Rylsky in 1918. The play appealed particularly to the new mood of resistance to established norms that followed the turmoil of World War 1. As well as Ukrainian performances in 1919, there was also a Czech performance that year. The staging of the play's Latvian translation in 1920 was also controversial, marked by adulation from the avant-garde and scandal among conservative members of the clergy.

== Musical settings ==
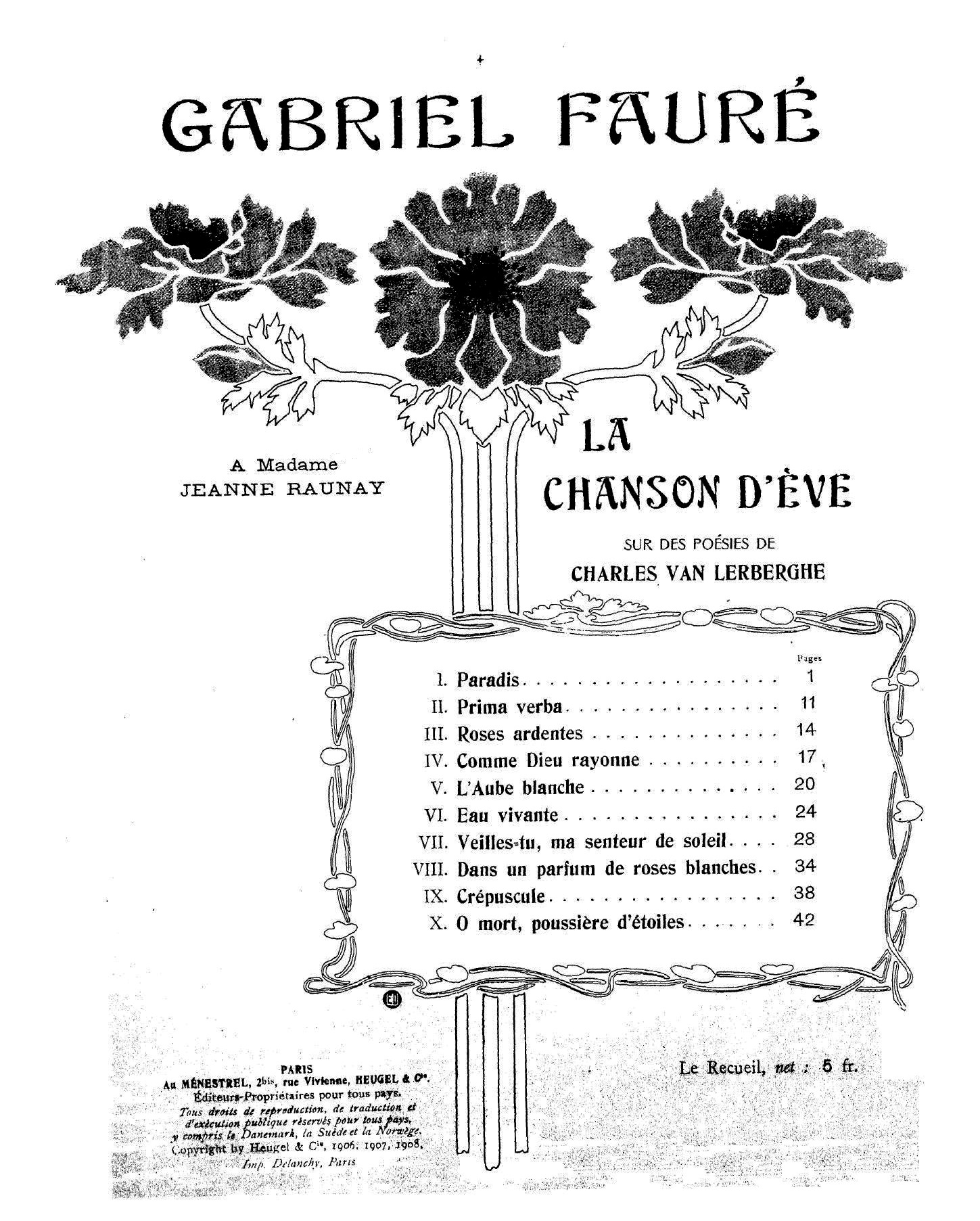
Gabriel Fauré's setting of ten songs from La Chanson d'Ève (1910)

Towards the end of van Lerberghe's lifetime, Gabriel Fauré had discovered in his poetry "a kind of Pre-Raphaelite language of feminine beauty and grace" that inspired in the composer the two song cycles that are the great works of his maturity. Between 1906 - 1909 he set ten poems for La chanson d'Ève, following with another cycle, Le jardin clos, set in 1914. An atheist himself, Fauré used his selection from the former collection to give added emphasis to that work's ambiguous atheism. He chose the title of his second cycle from the second section of Entrevisions, although poems from all its sections were among the eight that Fauré set.

During the first half of the 20th century, other composers set song cycles from Van Lerberghe's two collections. Six from Chanson d’Éve were chosen by Paul Lacombe (Op.132, 1907); eleven by Robert Herberigs in 1922; and fifteen in 1925 by Alfred La Liberté (1882-1952). René Bernier set four poems from Entrevisions, also in 1925, while fr:Louis de Serres borrowed Fauré's title for his Le Jardin Clos, suite de 5 poèmes pour voix de femme (Op. 6 ). Some single settings from Entrevisions have also been notable, particularly the Berceuse of Alphons Diepenbrock ("Le Seigneur a dit à son enfant" (1912), and Barque d'Or ("Dans une barque d'Orient"), set in the 1920s by Aldo Finzi, Eva Ruth Spalding also composed a single setting of van Lerberghe's "Vers le Soleil" in 1923.

== Legacy ==
In 1911, four years after his death, a stone memorial plaque carved in Art Nouveau capitals was set into the brickwork of the poet's birthplace at what is now 83 Franklin Rooseveltlaan. And in 1936 the Société des écrivains ardennais erected a carved granite boulder in Bouillon recording that van Lerberghe had composed La Chanson d'Ève in the town. His name is also remembered there in the small riverside Square Van Lerberghe. Elsewhere his name was given to the fr:Rue Charles Van Lerberghe (formerly Rue du Marché) in the Schaerbeek quarter of Brussels.

== Bibliography ==
- Graham Johnson, Gabriel Fauré: the songs and their poets, Ashgate Publishing 2009, pp. 299 - 344
- Charles Lerberghe, Anthologie des écrivains belges, Association des écrivains belges, 1911
- An introduction to Charles van Lerberghe with poems translated by Clark and Frances Stillman, Lyra Belgica II, Belgian Government Information Centre 1951.
