= The Treasure of the Humble =

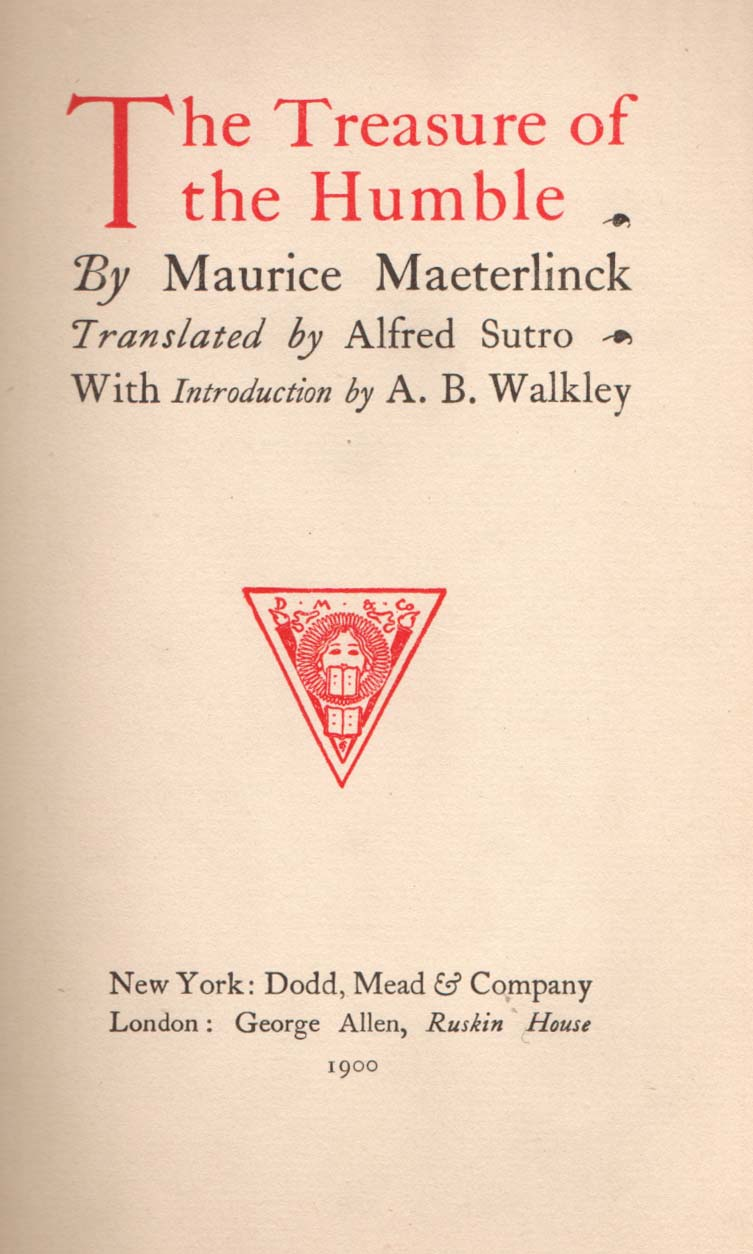
- Title page for the 1900 Dodd, Mead & Company edition of Maurice Maeterlinck's Treasure of the Humble
- Author: Maurice Maeterlinck
- Original title: Le Trésor des Humbles
- Translator: Alfred Sutro
- Language: French
- Genre: Essays
- Publisher: Mercure de France
- Publication date: 1896
- Publication place: Belgium
- English publication date: 1897
- Pages: 225 (English version, approx.)

The Treasure of the Humble (French: Le Trésor des humbles) is a collection of thirteen deeply reflective mystical essays by the Belgian Nobel Laureate Maurice Maeterlinck. The work is dedicated to Georgette Leblanc.

== Essays ==
- "Le Silence" ("Silence")
- "Le Réveil de L'Ame" ("The Awakening of the Soul")
- "Les Avertis" ("The Pre-Destined")
- "La Morale Mystique" ("Mystic Morality")
- "Sur Les Femmes" ("On Women")
- "Ruysbroeck L'Admirable"
- "Emerson"
- "Novalis"
- "Le Tragique Quotidien" ("The Tragical in Daily Life")
- "L'Étoile" ("The Star")
- "La Bonté Invisible" ("The Invisible Goodness")
- "La Vie Profonde" ("The Deeper Life")
- "La Beauté Intérieure" ("The Inner Beauty")

== English translations ==
The Treasure of the Humble was translated into English by Alfred Sutro with an introduction by A. B. Walkley in 1897. The English-language version does not include the essays on Ruysbroeck, Emerson, and Novalis.
