= Georgette Leblanc =

French opera singer (1869–1941)

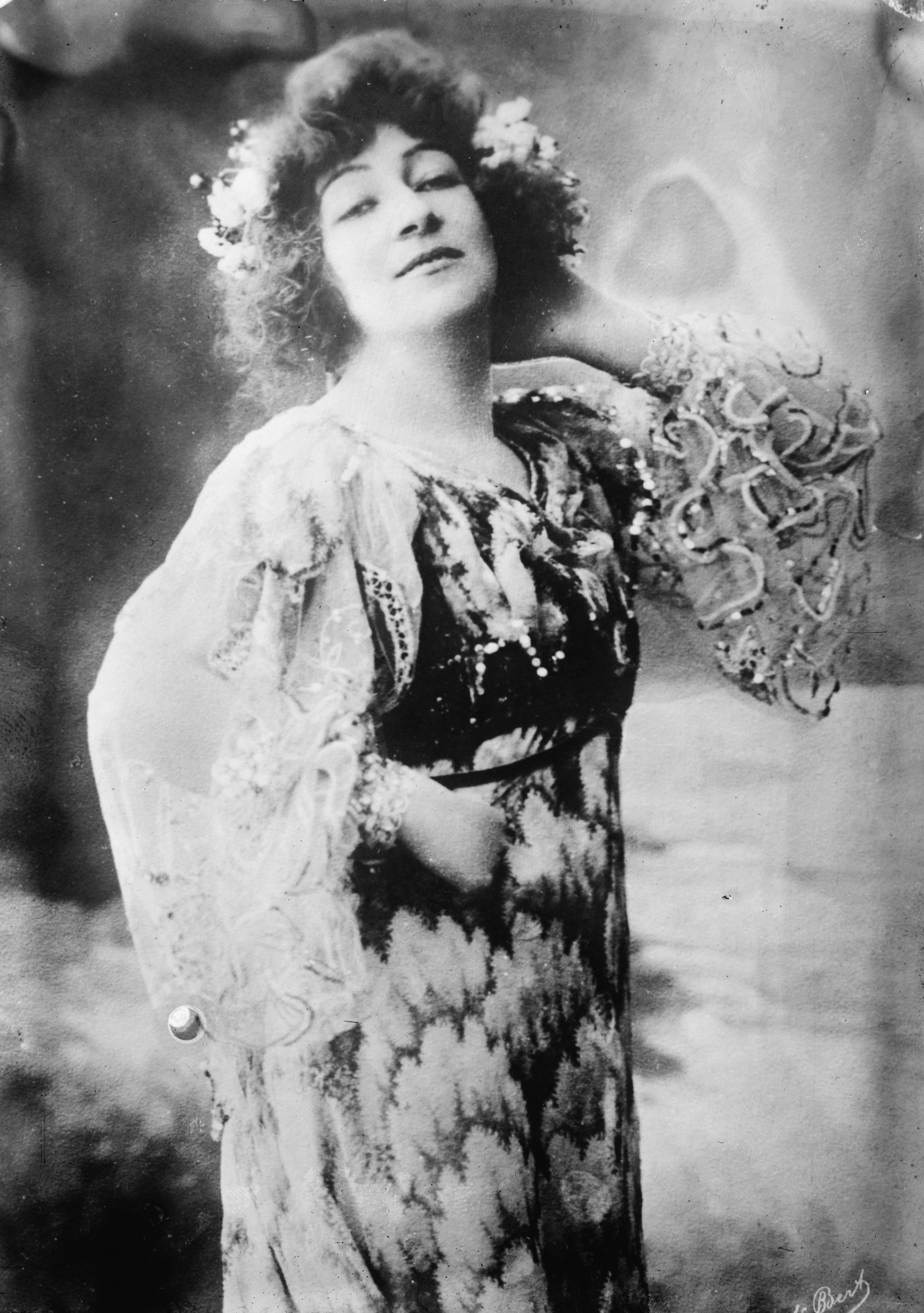
- Born: 8 February 1869; Rouen, France
- Died: 27 October 1941 (aged 72); Le Cannet, France
- Partners: Maurice Maeterlinck; Margaret Anderson

Georgette Leblanc (8 February 1869 – 27 October 1941) was a French operatic soprano, actress, author, and the sister of novelist Maurice Leblanc. She became particularly associated with the works of Jules Massenet and was an admired interpreter of the title role in Bizet's Carmen.

For many years Leblanc was the lover of Belgian playwright and writer Maurice Maeterlinck, and he wrote several parts for her within his stage plays. She played Ariane in Ariane et Barbe-bleue, both in the original 1899 stage play by Maeterlinck and in the 1907 opera adaptation by Paul Dukas, as well as La Mort de Tintagiles in 1905 in Paris. Leblanc also appeared in a couple of French films, most notably L'Inhumaine in 1924. In the last few decades of her life she turned to writing, producing two commercially successful autobiographies and several children's books and travelogues.

== Biography ==
Georgette Leblanc was born into a cultured family that valued the arts of all forms and encouraged her to pursue music, acting, and writing. She initially worked for a short time as an actress on the Paris stage before studying music under Jules Massenet in that city. She made her professional opera debut at the Opéra-Comique on 23 November 1893 as Françoise in Alfred Bruneau's L'attaque du moulin. Shortly thereafter she returned to that opera house to sing the title role in Bizet's Carmen. In 1894 she joined the roster at the Théâtre de la Monnaie where she sang numerous parts for the next three seasons, including: Anita in La Navarraise and the title roles in both Massenet's Thaïs and Carmen once again.

In 1895, Leblanc met playwright Maurice Maeterlinck in Brussels with whom she began a 23-year romantic relationship. That same year the couple moved to the district of Passy in Paris, living together openly to the chagrin of their Catholic families. Leblanc had married a Spanish man a few years previously, and the Roman Catholic Church refused to give her a divorce from her unhappy marriage. The couple's home became a center for the artistic community with individuals like Octave Mirbeau, Jean Lorrain, and Paul Fort frequently being entertained at their house. The couple also owned a home in Normandy where they would go for the summers.

Beginning with Aglavaine and Sélysette in 1896, she began to appear in a number of Maeterlinck's plays, several of which included characters specifically written for or based on her. She also sang in a number of recitals and concerts in Paris that included German lieder by Franz Schubert and Robert Schumann that had been translated into French by Maeterlinck. She remained active in opera in Paris, notably appearing as Fanny in Massenet's Sapho at the Opéra-Comique in 1897. She later recorded several arias from Sapho with the composer on the piano in 1903.

Beginning in August 1893, Maeterlinck collaborated with Claude Debussy on the opera Pelléas et Mélisande, which was based on Maeterlinck's play of the same name. Leblanc was originally slated to perform the role of Mélisande in the opera's 1902 premiere, but she was replaced by Mary Garden. This angered Maeterlinck, who threatened legal action and physical violence against Debussy for ousting his lover from the part. She did, however, originate the title role in the world premiere of Paul Dukas's operatic adaptation of Maeterlinck's Ariane et Barbe-bleue in 1907, having already portrayed Ariane in the original stage play in 1899 in Paris.

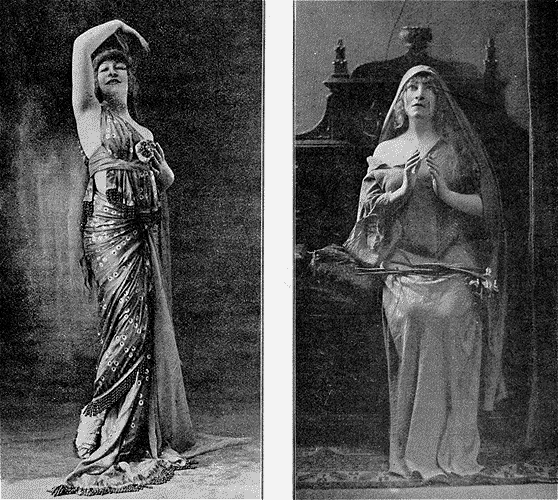
Georgette Leblanc in Mary Magdalene (1910)

In 1906, Leblanc and Maeterlinck moved to a villa in Grasse where their relationship began to experience difficulties. Maeterlinck became increasingly depressed and was eventually diagnosed with neurasthenia. He did however write several plays during this time, two of which, Marie-Victoire (1907) and Mary Magdalene (1910), had leading roles for Leblanc. In 1912–13, she sang at both the Manhattan Opera House in New York and at the Opéra de Monte-Carlo. She finally got to sing Mélisande in 1912 in its premiere in Boston with the Boston Opera Company, where she acted the part in the play and recorded four songs with Columbia Records. In 1914, Leblanc and Maeterlinck left Grasse for a villa near Nice and the following year Leblanc played Lady Macbeth in a French film adaptation of William Shakespeare's Macbeth. The couple stayed together four more years, but the relationship ended in 1918 when it became clear that he was involved with another woman, the much younger actress Renée Dahon.

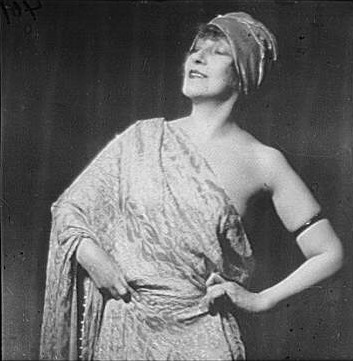
Georgette Leblanc, 1921

After her relationship with Maeterlinck ended, Leblanc remained active on the stage within his plays throughout the 1920s, although her singing career was pretty much over. She had a number of romantic relationships with high-profile individuals during the 1920s and 1930s. For a brief time she was involved with Greco-Armenian mystic G. I. Gurdjieff. She was also a close friend of fellow Gurdjieff student Margaret Anderson. She continued to be popular among the Parisian artistic social circles and was notably friends with Jean Cocteau and Marcel L'Herbier, in whose film L'Inhumaine (1924) she starred.

In 1930, Leblanc published Souvenirs (1895–1918), an account of her liaison with Maeterlinck. She also authored a further autobiography and several children's books and travelogues. She died at Cannes, Alpes-Maritimes in 1941 and was buried in the Notre Dame des Anges Cemetery beside Margaret Anderson.

== Works ==
- Le Choix de la Vie (1904)
- La Mort de Tintagiles (1905)
- The Children's Bluebird (1913)
- The Girl who Found the Blue Bird: A visit to Helen Keller (1914)
- Maeterlinck's Dogs (1919)
- The Choice of Life (1927)
- Souvenir (1931)
- Souvenirs: My life with Maeterlinck (1932)
- Story of the Blue Bird (1939)
- La Machine à Courage (1947)
