= Renée Dahon =

French actress

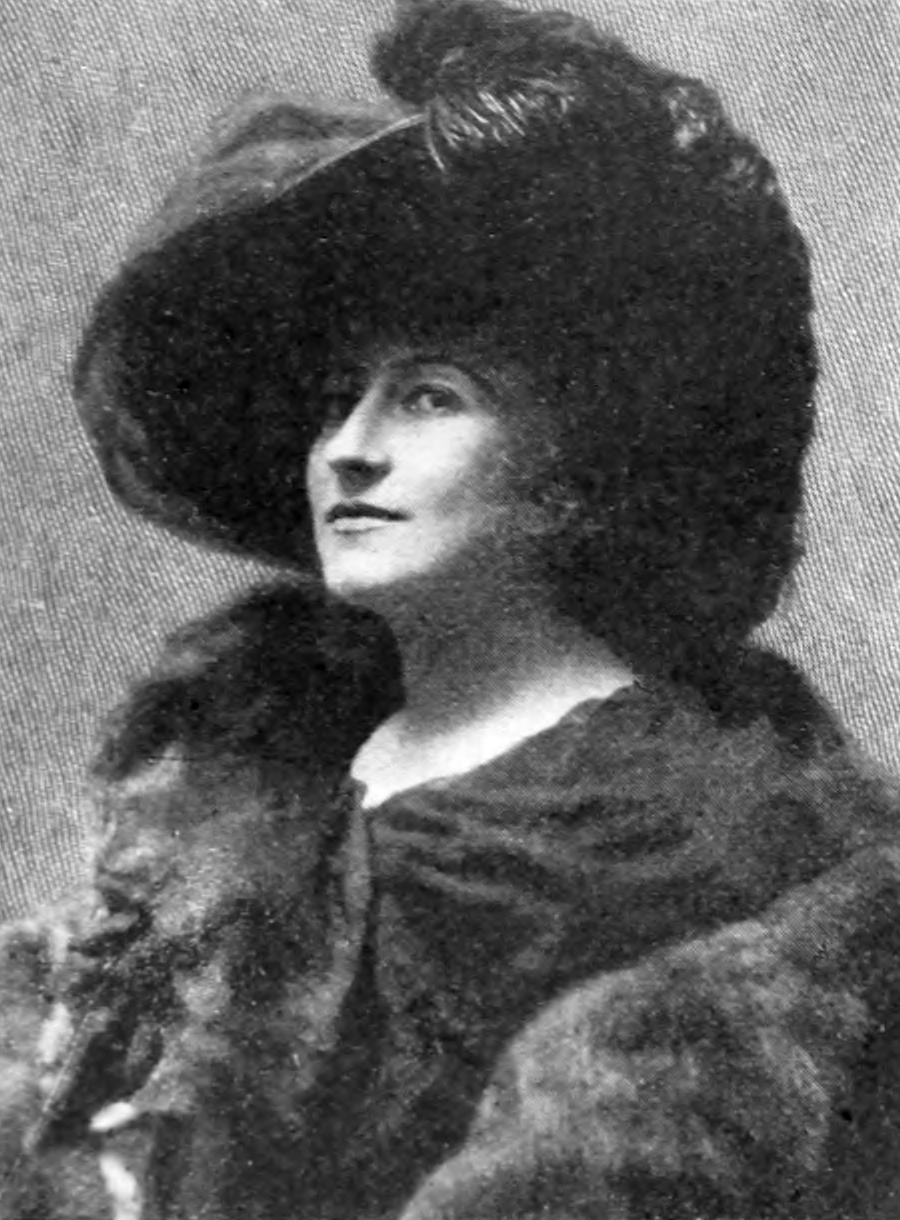
Renée Dahon in 1910

Renée Dahon (1893–1969) was a French actress.

== Personal life ==
Dahon was born on 18 December 1893. She was described as short (around five feet tall) and slim.

Following an eight-year-long affair, Dahon married playwright Maurice Maeterlinck at Chateau Neuf-de-Contes in 1919. In the early 1930s, Dahon gave birth to a stillborn child.

In 1940, Maeterlinck and Dahon were forced to flee their home in Paris with her parents due to the advance of the Germans. They arrived in the United States in July 1940, and resettled in New York City, moving into an apartment in the Hotel Esplanade. After the war, they were able to return to their home "Orlamonde" in Nice in 1947. Despite their age difference, friends reported them to be devoted to each other.

Dahon died on 8 December 1969, aged 75.

== Career ==
Renée Dahon was a popular actress in Paris. She became known at age 18 for her role as Tyltyl in The Blue Bird. Georgette Leblanc, Maeterlinck's then-partner, selected and coached her for the role. She also acted in several films.
