= Intruder (play) =

One-act play by Maurice Maeterlinck

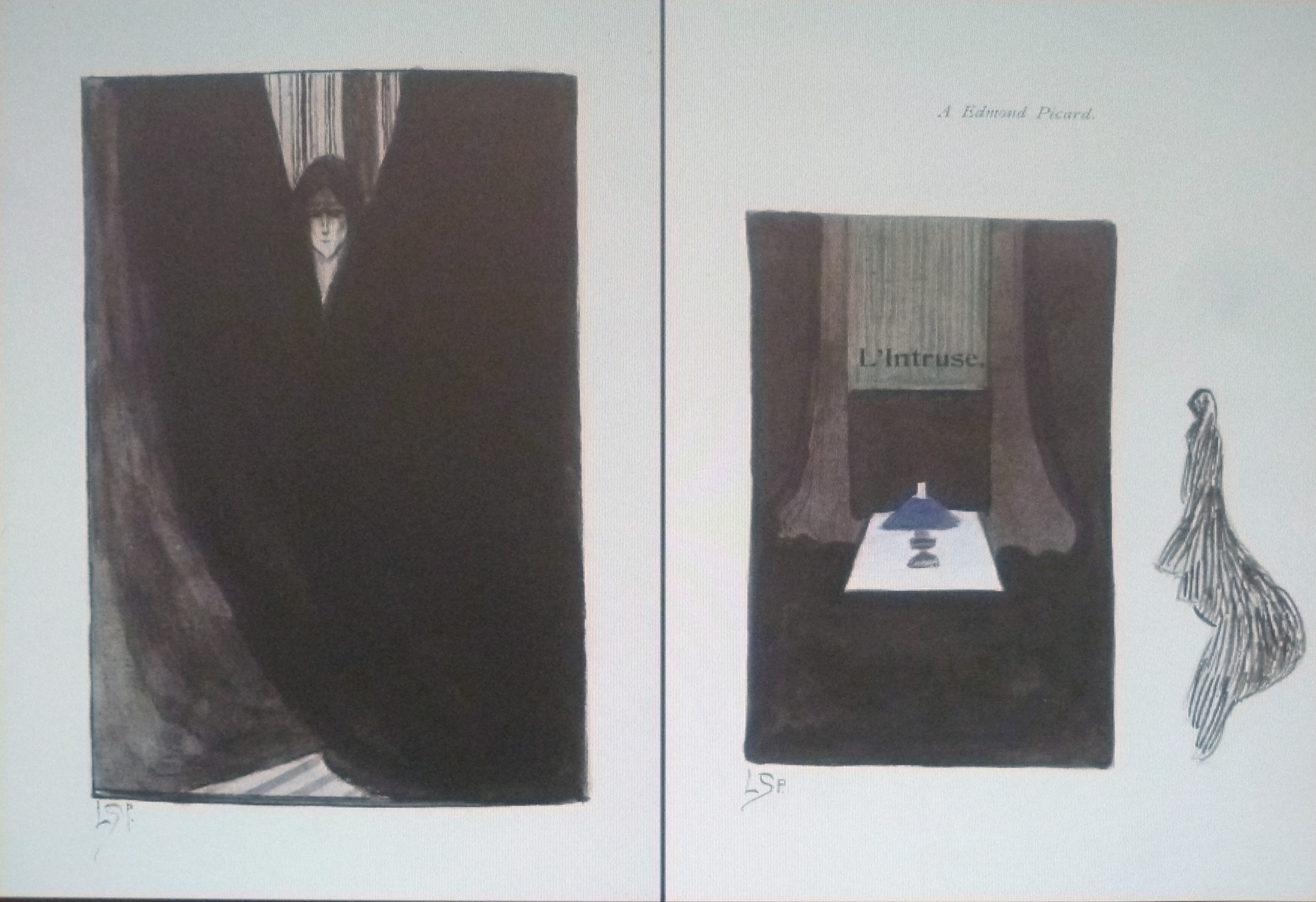
- L'Intruse - with illustrations by Léon Spilliaert (1903)
- Written by: Maurice Maeterlinck
- Genre: Symbolism

Premiere
- Date: 20 May 1891

Intruder (French: L'Intruse) is a one-act play by Belgian playwright Maurice Maeterlinck, which appeared first in publication in 1890. Journalistic appreciations of the text throughout that year prompted Parisian independent theatre producers to get the performance rights. From its stage debut the following spring, it became identified as a landmark work in the Symbolism movement of the late-nineteenth century.

Intruder concerns man's conflict with preternatural forces, against which he is powerless. The same theme was prevalent in Maeterlinck's earlier play, Princess Maleine, published 1889.

The play is dedicated to Edmond Picard.

== Premiere ==
Paul Fort's Théâtre d'Art first produced the play in Paris on 20 May 1891, at the Théâtre du Vaudeville, as part of a program of poetry readings and short plays to benefit Paul Verlaine and Paul Gauguin. Maeterlinck recalled in his memoirs that if the program went on too long, then the play was to be removed. Fortunately, it went on, and Intruder received much critical praise. Equally striking to both critics and audience was its novel staging, featuring the soon-to-be signature Symbolist acting style—conveying a religious reverie, with its hieratic poses and gestures, matched with solemn, psalmodized line readings—forged by the new acting talents Aurélien Lugné-Poe and Georgette Camée.

== Synopsis ==
Set in the living room of a home, the grandfather, who is blind, waits with the father, the uncle, and the three daughters. They wait for the arrival of the priest and the sister. The ailing mother, who is in the next room, has given birth to a child, who sleeps in another adjoining room.

After hearing many noises, the grandfather hears two sets of footsteps upon the staircase. The maid appears, saying the door was open, so she shut it. The grandfather claims he heard someone enter the room behind the maid, but the others in the room say she was alone. The clock strikes midnight, the baby commences screaming, and the Sister of Mercy appears, announcing the death of the mother. It became clear that the intruder being referred to by the old man was death itself. Later, Maeterlinck would explain the dominance of this element (which was recurring in his other plays) so that it was almost treated as a character in the narrative: "This Unknown takes on, most frequently, the form of Death. The infinite presence of death, gloomy, hypocritically active, fills all the interstices of the poem. To the problem of its existence no reply is made except by the riddle of its annihilation."

== Techniques ==
Maeterlinck used several unconventional literary devices in Intruder. For example, he invested special valence in buildings to dramatize patterns of behavior, such as the house representing a form of introversion in which libido (psychic energy) flows inward. The text's conspicuous word repetitions might strike an audience as unnecessary or an oversight on the part of the author. Maeterlinck, however, employed this technique in several of his plays to enhance the atmosphere of the supernatural, horror, fear, gloom, and awe. Some observers have likened this characteristic to what Edgar Allan Poe aimed for with his liberal use of the rhyme "-ore" in The Raven, a likely association considering that the 1891 benefit premiere followed the play with an actor reciting "Le Corbeau"—poet Stéphane Mallarmé's French translation of Poe's influential 1845 poem.

== English translations ==
L'Intruse has been translated into English twice: by Mary Vielé in 1891, and by American poet Richard Hovey in 1894.
