= Pelléas et Mélisande (Sibelius) =

1905 incidental music by Jean Sibelius

Pelléas and Mélisande
- Theatre score & suite by Jean Sibelius
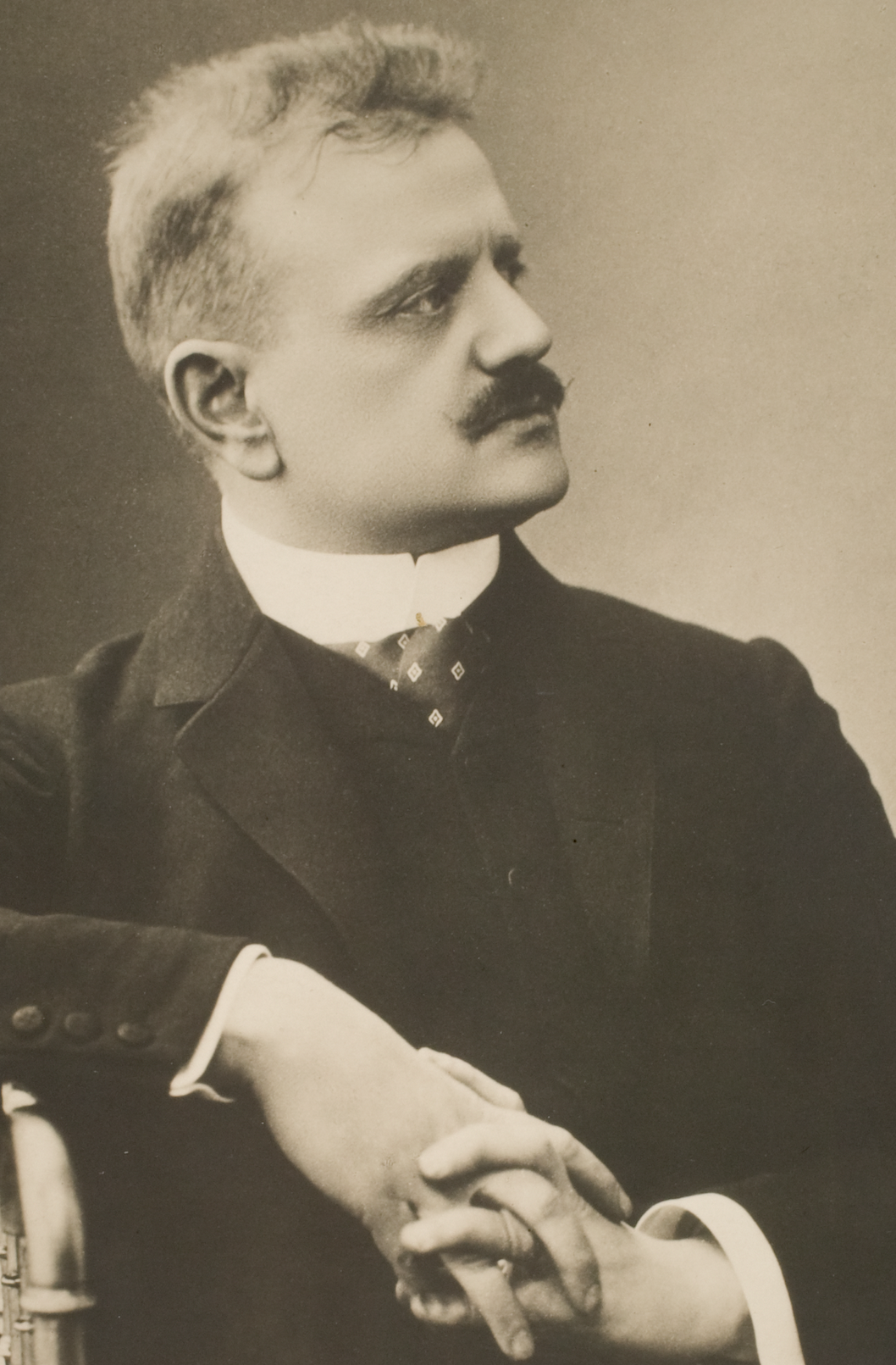
- The composer (c. 1905)
- Native name: Pelléas och Mélisande
- Catalogue: JS 147 (score)
- Opus: 46 (suite)
- Text: play by Maurice Maeterlinck
- Language: Swedish (trans. French)
- Composed: 1905, arr. 1905
- Publisher: Lienau (Op. 46)
- Movements: 10 (JS 147); 9 (Op. 46)

Premiere
- Date: 17 March 1905
- Location: Swedish Theatre; Helsinki, Grand Duchy of Finland
- Conductor: Jean Sibelius
- Performers: Helsinki Philharmonic Society

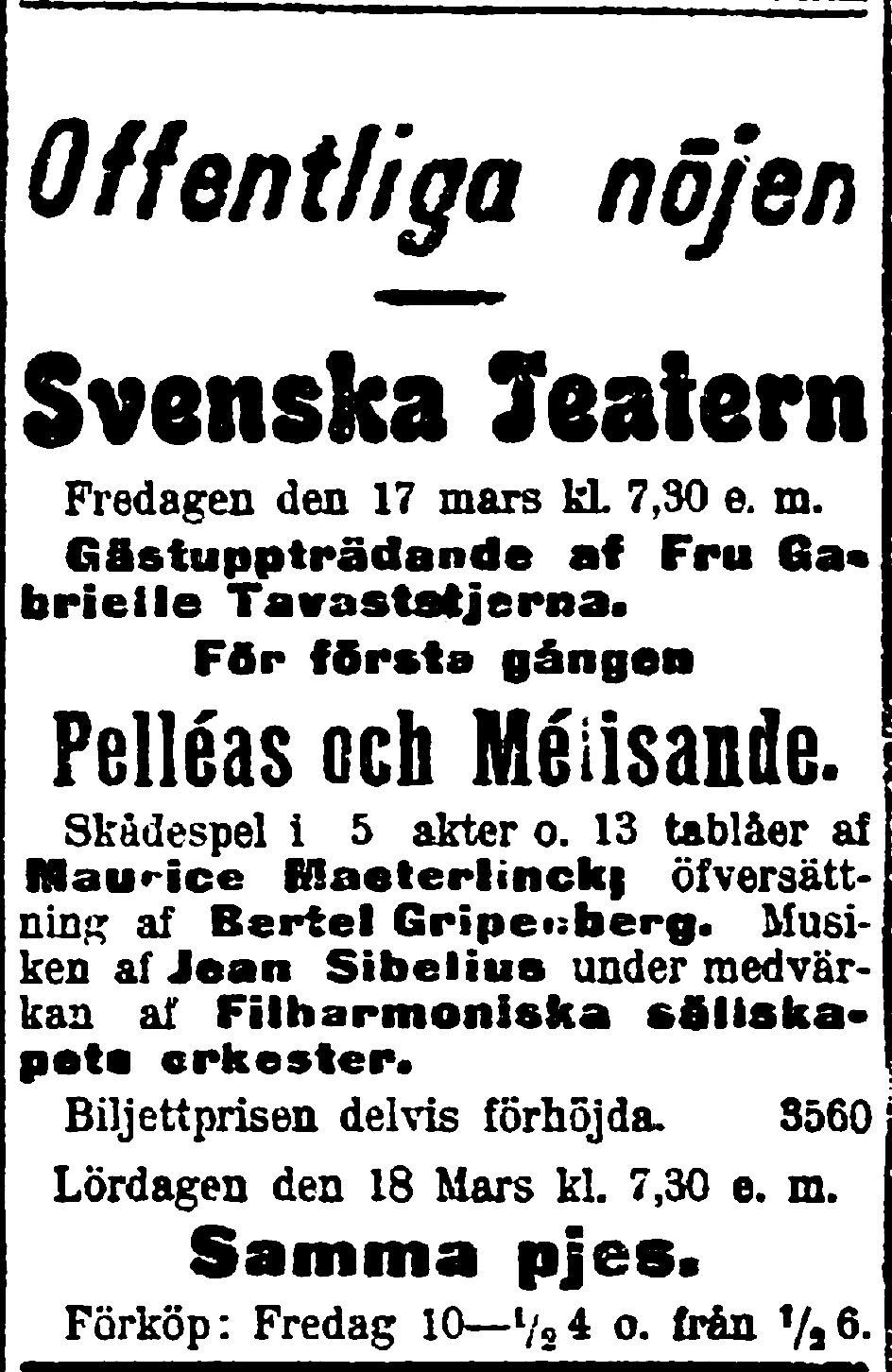
A 17 March 1905 advertisement in Hufvudstadsbladet promoting Sibelius's incidental music to Pelléas och Mélisande

Pelléas et Mélisande (Pelléas och Mélisande), JS 147, is incidental music by Jean Sibelius for Maurice Maeterlinck's 1892 play Pelléas and Mélisande. Sibelius composed in 1905 ten parts, overtures to the five acts and five other movements. It was first performed at the Swedish Theatre in Helsinki on 17 March 1905 to a translation by Bertel Gripenberg, conducted by the composer.

Sibelius later slightly rearranged the music into a nine movement suite, published as Op. 46, which became one of his most popular concert works.

== Movements of the suite ==
The movements were derived from the following numbers:

1. At the Castle Gate (Prelude from act 1, scene 1)
  The opening movement of the suite for orchestra is called "At the Castle Gate". The strings introduce an atmospheric, brief theme, which is then restated with help from the woodwind. This introduction is closed by austere chords. This section is familiar to British television viewers as the theme of the world's longest-running TV programme (1957–present), the BBC's The Sky at Night, first presented by Sir Patrick Moore (1923-2012) and presently by Chris Lintott and Maggie Aderin-Pocock.
2. Mélisande (Prelude from act 1, scene 2)
  The character Mélisande is introduced with characteristically strong material presented by a cor anglais solo.
3. At the Seashore (Melodrama from act 1, scene 4)
  A brief intermezzo, which Sibelius regarded as dispensable in concert performances.
4. A Spring in the Park (Prelude from act 2, scene 1)
  The strings present the dense sonorities of the melodic material of "A Spring in the Park".
5. The Three Blind Sisters (Mélisande's Song from act 3, scene 2)
  In "Three Blind Sisters" another cor anglais solo is answered by monolithic orchestral harmonies.
6. Pastorale (Melodrama from act 3, scene 4)
  The sixth movement, "Pastorale," is scored for woodwind and string instruments and exhibits the subtlety of chamber music.
7. Mélisande at the Spinning Wheel (Prelude from act 3, scene 1)
  The seventh, "Mélisande at the Spinning Wheel," presents the largest and most dramatic image heard so far. This immense movement could serve as a symphonic finale in its own right but the pace of the drama demands an epilogue.
8. Entr'acte (Prelude from act 4, scene 1)
9. The Death of Mélisande (Prelude from act 5, scene 2).
  With the moving "The Death of Mélisande," the tragic story of the doomed love affair reaches its conclusion.

Excluded from the suite is the prelude to act 4, scene 2, as well as the vocal version of no. 5, Mélisande's Song. Sibelius later made a transcription of the suite for solo piano, excluding the 'At the Seashore' movement.

== Orchestration ==
The work is scored for flute (with piccolo), oboe (with English horn), two clarinets, two bassoons, two horns, timpani/triangle/bass drum, and strings.
