= Mary Magdalene (play) =

1910 play by Maurice Maeterlinck

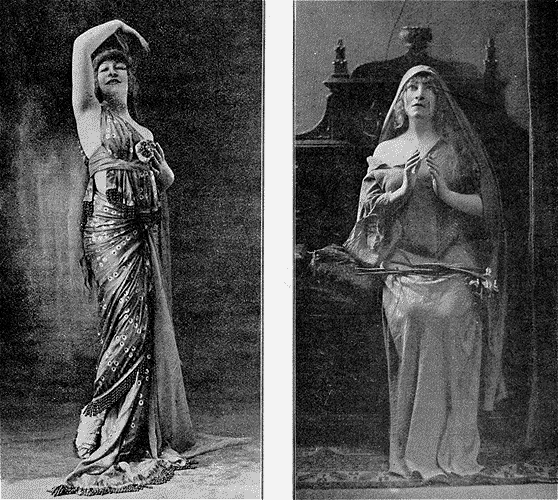
- Georgette Leblanc in Mary Magdalene (1910)
- Written by: Maurice Maeterlinck
- Characters: Mary Magdalene, Lucius Verus, Jesus (voice only), healed blind man, others
- Genre: tragedy
- Setting: Jerusalem at the time of the Passion

Premiere
- Date premiered: 1910
- Place premiered: The New Theatre, New York City

Mary Magdalene is a 1910 tragic play by Belgian playwright Maurice Maeterlinck. It inspired a symphonic work by Kosaku Yamada.

The play had its premiere in an English translation performed at New York City's New Theatre on December 5, 1910. That was also the first United States performance of any Maeterlinck play.

Based on the Biblical story of Mary Magdalene, the plot of the three-act play was summarized by the New York Times in 1910 as follows:

The Magdalene is a courtesan, who in the course of the drama becomes ennobled spiritually by contact with the Nazarene [Jesus]. Her tempter and lover, Lucius Verus, the Roman General, labors under the delusion that the Nazarene is his rival, so when the woman begs Verus to save Jesus from crucifixion, he names as his price the Magdalene's complete surrender to him. The glory of her reformation has been too complete to permit her to accede to Verus' wishes, and Mary vainly turns to those who have been cured by the Nazarene and urges them to save Him, but they shrink from her in cowardice.

With her refusal, the Roman officer charges the Magdalene with having been the Savior's undoing, and the crowd revile her, linking her name with that of Judas. Actual violence is prevented by an uproar in the street below. The Nazarene is on his way to his doom, and the spectacle is described by the blind man to whom the Savior had given sight. The final scene shows Verus leaving the Magdalene, a motionless statue, as he goes out to join the screeching, cursing mob stoning Christ as he stumbles toward the cross."
