= Father Setubal =

- Written by: Maurice Maeterlinck

Father Setubal (L'Abbé Sétubal) is a play by Maurice Maeterlinck dating probably to 1941 and first performed in that year in Lisbon. It is about a priest who hears the confession of a murderer who refuses to admit his crime publicly, after an innocent man has been condemned for it. In order to rescue the innocent without breaking the seal of confession, the priest accuses himself of the crime. The play was first published in Maeterlinck, Théatre Inédit in 1959. (See Paul Gorceix, Maeterlinck: L'Arpenteur de l'invisible (Brussels 2005), pp. 476-7).
