= Eva Ruth Spalding =

British composer

Eva Ruth Spalding (19 December 1883 - March 1969) was a British composer, violin and piano teacher who wrote six string quartets, solo piano music and songs.

Spalding was born in Blackheath, Kent, to Henry Spalding (a paper merchant) and his second wife Ellen. She was the youngest of eight children, with four half-siblings and three full siblings. One of the full siblings was Selma Nellie Spalding (1881–1965), later Lady Lennard.

Spalding studied at the Royal Academy of Music, where she passed the violin teacher exam in 1904. She also studied with Leopold Auer at the St. Petersburg Conservatory in Russia. After returning to England, she taught piano and violin privately and at Bradfield College. In the 1920s she was sharing rooms and appearing in concerts with pianist composer Beatrice Mary Hall (1890–1961). (Hall's Six melodies pour piano (1923) are dedicated to Spalding). From the 1940s she lived at Tyndrum, Pond Lane, Churt in Surrey. In the 1950s she still occasionally performed in a piano duet with Daniel Kelly (1898–1993).

She set texts by the following poets to music: Léon Bazalgette, William Blake, Phineas Fletcher, Paul Fort, Fernand Gregh, George Herbert, Ioannes Papadiamantopoulos (as Jean Moréas), Edmund Spenser, Charles van Lerberghe, Clara Walsh, and Walt Whitman.

Spalding composed six string quartets, the first in the early 1920s. No. 5 was performed by the Aleph String Quartet at the Wigmore Hall on Tuesday 25 April 1950, along with the Five Songs from Spencer's Amoretti, sung by tenor Frederick Fuller. It was described by critic Scott Goddard as "contemporary in sentiment, and not at all modern in manner". Her music was published by Maurice Senart, with many of the song texts in both French and English versions.

She died at Churt in 1969, aged 85.

== Selected works ==
Piano

- Etude for the Left Hand (1919)
- Fantasie (1958)
- Melodie for the left hand (1934)
- Prelude (1919)

Songs

- 'Berceuse d'Izumo' (1922, Japanese text, tr. Clara Walsh)
- Five Songs from Spencer's Amoretti (1950)
- 'Mort! le vent pleure autour du monde' (1925, text Paul Fort)
- 'Oses-tu maintenant' (1923, text Walt Whitman, tr. into French Leon Bazalgette.)
- 'Passing of the Spring' (1921, Japanese text, tr. Clara Walsh)
- 'Une Plaint' (1922, Japanese text: tr: Clara Walsh)
- 'Quand je viendrai m'asseoir' (1923, text Jean Moreas)
- 'Le Silence de l'eau' (1923, text Fernand Gregh)
- 'Soupirs' (1920, Japanese text: tr: Clara Walsh)
- Three Melodies for voice and piano or string quartet (1929)
  - 'The Lamb' (text: William Blake)
  - 'The Litany' (text: Phineus Fletcher)
  - 'Easter Words' (text: George Herbert)
- Three Melodies for voice and piano (1919, texts: Walt Whitman, French tr. Leon Balzagette)
  - 'Youth, Day, Old Age and Night'
  - 'A Clear Midnight'
  - 'The Lost Invocation'
- 'Le Vent nous pousse' (1925, text Paul Fort)
- 'Vers le soleil s'en vont ensemble' (1923, text: C.von Leberghe)

Chamber

- Poeme (violin and piano)
- String Quartet No. 1 (1923, dedicated to Leopold Auer)
- String Quartet No. 2 (1928)
- String Quartet No. 3
- String Quartet No. 4
- String Quartet No. 5 (1950)
- String Quartet No. 6
- Violin Sonata No. 1
- Violin Sonata No. 2 (1928)
- Violin Sonata No. 3 (1952)

Orchestral

- Music for Strings
