= Maurice Maeterlinck =

Belgian playwright and essayist (1862–1949)

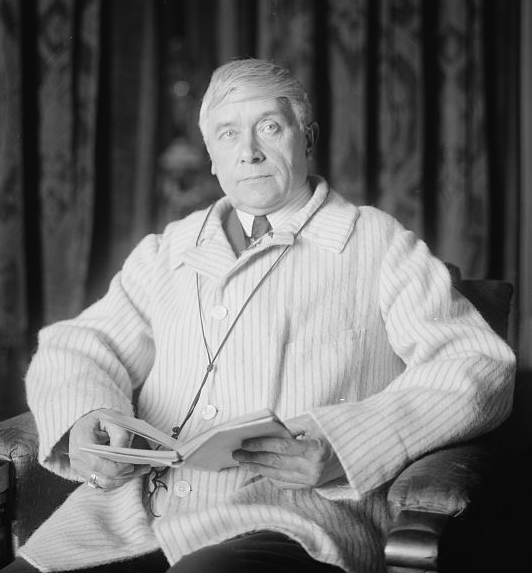
- Maeterlinck, c. 1915–1920
- Born: Maurice Polydore Marie Bernard Maeterlinck; 29 August 1862; Ghent, Belgium
- Died: 6 May 1949 (aged 86); Nice, France
- Education: University of Ghent
- Occupations: Playwright; poet; essayist
- Spouse: Renée Dahon
- Partner: Georgette Leblanc
- Writing career
- Language: French
- Notable works: Intruder (1890); The Blind (1890); Pelléas et Mélisande (1893); Interior (1895); The Blue Bird (1908)
- Notable awards: Nobel Prize in Literature; 1911; Triennial Prize for Dramatic Literature; 1903
- Movement: Symbolism

Signature
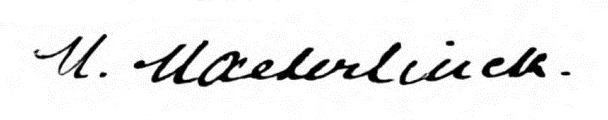

Maurice Polydore Marie Bernard Maeterlinck (Note: Spelled Maurice (Mooris) Polidore Marie Bernhard Maeterlinck on the official Nobel Prize page.) (Note: Pronunciation: /ˈmeɪtərlɪŋk/ MAYT-ər-link, US also /ˈmɛt-, ˈmæt-/ MET-, MAT-; French: [mɔʁis matɛʁlɛ̃k] in Belgium, [- mɛteʁ-] in France.) (29 August 1862 – 6 May 1949), also known as Count/Comte Maeterlinck from 1932, was a Belgian playwright, poet, and essayist who was Flemish but wrote in French. He was awarded the Nobel Prize in Literature in 1911 "in appreciation of his many-sided literary activities, and especially of his dramatic works, which are distinguished by a wealth of imagination and by a poetic fancy, which reveals, sometimes in the guise of a fairy tale, a deep inspiration, while in a mysterious way they appeal to the readers' own feelings and stimulate their imaginations". The main themes in his work are death and the meaning of life. He was a leading member of the group La Jeune Belgique, and his plays form an important part of the Symbolist movement. In later life, Maeterlinck faced credible accusations of plagiarism.

== Biography ==
=== Early life ===
Maeterlinck was born in Ghent, Belgium, to a wealthy, French-speaking family. His mother, Mathilde Colette Françoise (née Van den Bossche), came from a wealthy family. His father, Polydore, was a notary who enjoyed tending the greenhouses on their property.

In September 1874, he was sent to the Jesuit College of Sainte-Barbe, where works of the French Romantics were scorned and only plays on religious subjects were permitted. His experiences at this school influenced his distaste for the Catholic Church and organized religion. One of his companions at that time was the writer Charles van Lerberghe, the poems and plays of whom went on to act as mutual influences on each other at the start of the Symbolist period.

Maeterlinck had written poems and short novels while still studying, but his father wanted him to go into law. After gaining a law degree at the University of Ghent in 1885, he spent a few months in Paris, France. He met members of the new Symbolist movement; Villiers de l'Isle Adam in particular, who would have a great influence on Maeterlinck's subsequent work.

=== Career ===
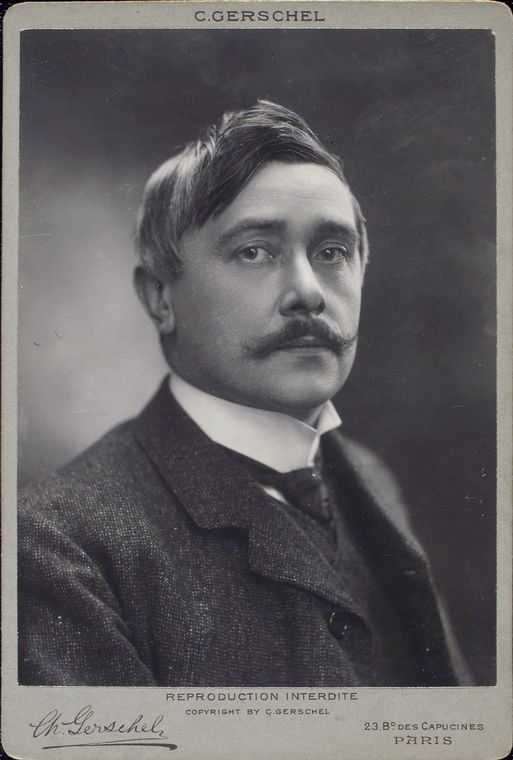
Maeterlinck early in his career

Maeterlinck instantly became a public figure when his first play, Princess Maleine, received enthusiastic praise from Octave Mirbeau, the literary critic of Le Figaro, in August 1890. In the following years he wrote a series of symbolist plays characterized by fatalism and mysticism, most importantly Intruder (1890), The Blind (1890) and Pelléas and Mélisande (1892).

He had a relationship with the singer and actress Georgette Leblanc from 1895 until 1918. Leblanc influenced his work for the following two decades. With the play Aglavaine and Sélysette (1896) Maeterlinck began to create characters, especially female characters, who were more in control of their destinies. Leblanc performed these female characters on stage. Even though mysticism and metaphysics influenced his work throughout his career, Maeterlinck slowly replaced his Symbolism with a more existential style.

In 1895, with his parents frowning upon his open relationship with an actress, Maeterlinck and Leblanc moved to the district of Passy in Paris. The Catholic Church was unwilling to grant her a divorce from her Spanish husband. The couple frequently entertained guests, including Mirbeau, Jean Lorrain, and Paul Fort. They spent their summers in Normandy. During this period, Maeterlinck published his Twelve Songs (1896), The Treasure of the Humble (1896), The Life of the Bee (1901), and Ariadne and Bluebeard (1902).

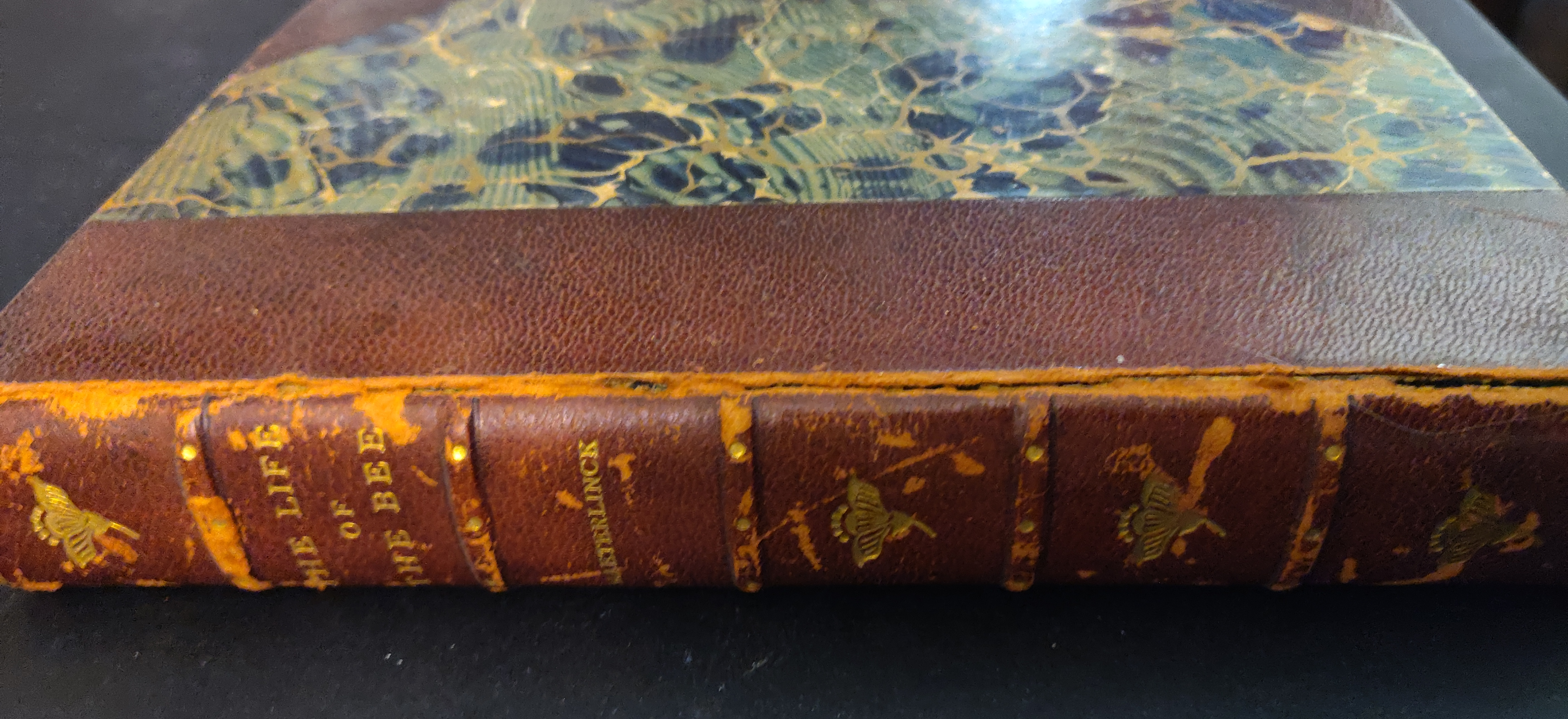
A 1902 marbled edition of The Life of the Bee, Dodd, Mead and Company, Pub.

In 1903, Maeterlinck received the Triennial Prize for Dramatic Literature from the Belgian government. During this period, and up until the Great War of 1914–1918, he was widely looked up to, throughout Europe, as a great sage, and the embodiment of the higher thought of the time.

In 1906, Maeterlinck and Leblanc moved to a villa in Grasse in the south of France. He spent his hours meditating and walking. As he emotionally pulled away from Leblanc, he entered a state of depression. Diagnosed with neurasthenia, he rented the Benedictine Abbey of St. Wandrille in Normandy to help him relax. By renting the abbey he rescued it from the desecration of being sold and used as a chemical factory and thus he received a blessing from the Pope. Leblanc would often walk around in the garb of an abbess; he would wear roller skates as he moved about the house. During this time, he wrote his essay "The Intelligence of Flowers" (published in 1907), in which he expressed sympathy with socialist ideas. He donated money to many workers' unions and socialist groups. At this time he conceived his greatest contemporary success: the fairy play The Blue Bird (1908, but largely written in 1906).

Stanislavsky's 1908 Moscow production, of extraordinary visual beauty, is still over a century later regularly performed in Moscow, in a shortened version as a children's matinee. After the writing of "The Intelligence of Flowers", he suffered from a period of depression and writer's block. Although he recovered from this after a year or two, he never became so inventive as a writer again. His later plays, such as Marie-Victoire (1907) and Mary Magdalene (1910), provided with lead roles for Leblanc, were notably inferior to their predecessors, and sometimes merely repeat an earlier formula. Even though alfresco performances of some of his plays at St. Wandrille had been successful, Maeterlinck felt that he was losing his privacy. The death of his mother on 11 June 1910 added to his depression.

In 1910 he met the 18-year-old actress Renée Dahon during a rehearsal of The Blue Bird. She became his companion. After having been nominated by Carl Bildt, a member of the Swedish Academy, he received the Nobel Prize for Literature in 1911, which served to lighten his spirits. By 1913, he had become more openly socialist and sided with the Belgian trade unions against the Catholic party during a strike. He began to study mysticism and lambasted the Catholic Church in his essays for misconstruing the history of the universe. By a decree of 26 January 1914, the Roman Catholic Church placed his opera omnia on the Index Librorum Prohibitorum.

When Germany invaded Belgium in 1914, Maeterlinck wished to join the French Foreign Legion, but his application was denied due to his age. He and Leblanc decided to leave Grasse for a villa near Nice, where he spent the next decade of his life. He gave speeches on the bravery of the Belgian people and placed the blame upon all Germans for the war. His reputation as a great sage who stood above current affairs was damaged by his political involvement.

While in Nice, he wrote The Mayor of Stilmonde (1918), which the American press quickly labeled a "Great War Play", and which became a British film in 1929. He also wrote The Betrothal (French: Les Fiançailles, 1922), a sequel to The Blue Bird, in which the heroine of the play is clearly not a Leblanc archetype.

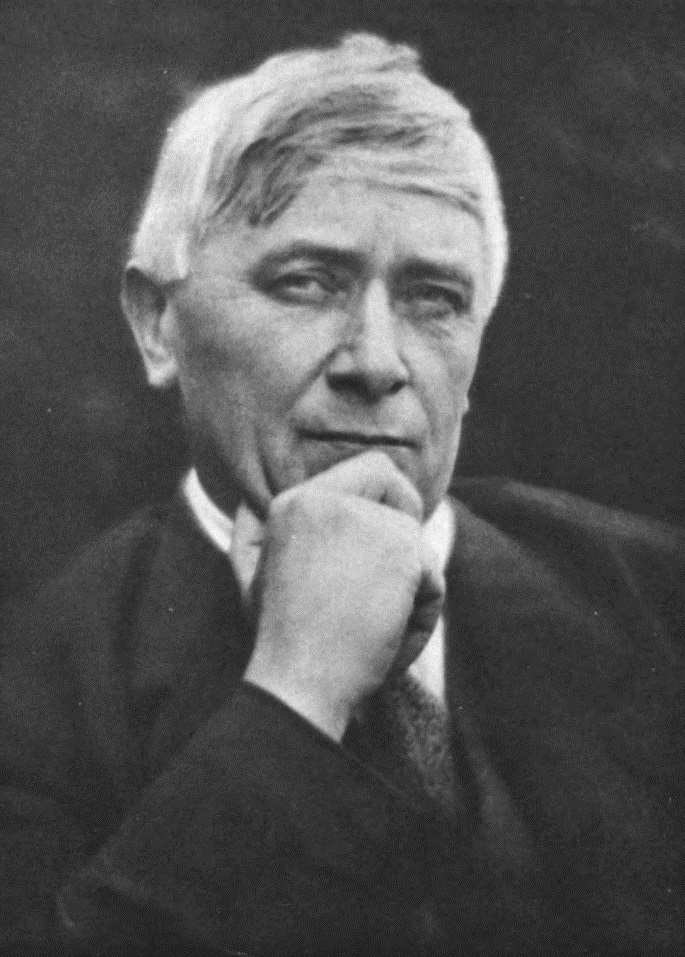
Maeterlinck in 1915

On 15 February 1919, Maeterlinck married Dahon. He accepted an invitation to the United States, where Samuel Goldwyn asked him to produce a few scenarios for film. Only two of Maeterlinck's submissions still exist; Goldwyn didn't use any of them. Maeterlinck had prepared one based on his The Life of the Bee. After reading the first few pages Goldwyn burst out of his office, exclaiming: "My God! The hero is a bee!"

After 1920, Maeterlinck ceased to contribute significantly to the theatre, but continued to produce essays on his favourite themes of occultism, ethics and natural history. The international demand for these fell off sharply after the early 1920s, but his sales in France remained substantial until the late 1930s. Dahon gave birth to a stillborn child in 1925.

=== Plagiarism ===
In 1926, Maeterlinck published La Vie des Termites (translated into English as The Life of Termites or The Life of White Ants), an entomological book that plagiarised the book The Soul of the (White) Ant, by the Afrikaner poet and scientist Eugène Marais. David Bignell, in his inaugural address as Professor of Zoology at the University of London (2003), called Maeterlinck's work "a classic example of academic plagiarism". Marais accused Maeterlinck of having appropriated Marais' concept of the "organic unity" of the termite nest in his book. Marais had published his ideas on termite nests in the South African Afrikaans-language press, in Die Burger (January 1923) and in Huisgenoot, which featured a series of articles on termites under the title "Die Siel van die Mier" (The Soul of the (White) Ant) from 1925 to 1926. Maeterlinck's book, with almost identical content, was published in 1926. It is conjectured that Maeterlinck had come across Marais' articles while writing his book, and that it would have been easy for him to translate Afrikaans into French, since Maeterlinck knew Dutch and had already made several translations from Dutch into French. It was common at the time, moreover, for worthy articles published in Afrikaans to be reproduced in Flemish and Dutch magazines and journals.

Marais wrote in a letter to Dr. Winifred de Kock in London about Maeterlinck that

The famous author had paid me the left-handed compliment of cribbing the most important part of my work ... He clearly desired his readers to infer that he had arrived at certain of my theories (the result of ten years of hard labour in the veld) by his own unaided reason, although he admits that he never saw a termite in his life. You must understand that it was not merely plagiarism of the spirit of a thing, so to speak. He has copied page after page verbally.

Supported by a coterie of Afrikaner Nationalist friends, Marais sought justice through the South African press and attempted an international lawsuit. This was to prove financially impossible and the case was not pursued. All the same, he gained a measure of renown as the aggrieved party and as an Afrikaner researcher who had opened himself up to plagiarism because he published in Afrikaans out of nationalistic loyalty. Marais brooded at the time of the scandal: "I wonder whether Maeterlinck blushes when he reads such things [critical acclaim], and whether he gives a thought to the injustice he does to the unknown Boer worker?"

Maeterlinck's own words in The Life of Termites indicate that the possible discovery or accusation of plagiarism worried him:

It would have been easy, in regard to every statement, to allow the text to bristle with footnotes and references. In some chapters there is not a sentence but would have clamoured for these; and the letterpress would have been swallowed up by vast masses of comment, like one of those dreadful books we hated so much at school. There is a short bibliography at the end of the volume which will no doubt serve the same purpose.

Whatever Maeterlinck's misgivings at the time of writing, the bibliography he refers to does not include Eugène Marais.

Professor V. E. d'Assonville referred to Maeterlinck as "the Nobel Prize winner who had never seen a termite in his whole life and had never put a foot on the soil of Africa, least of all in the Waterberg".

Robert Ardrey, an admirer of Eugène Marais, attributed Marais' later suicide to this act of plagiarism and theft of intellectual property by Maeterlinck, although Marais' biographer, Leon Rousseau, suggested that Marais had enjoyed and even thrived on the controversy and the attention it generated.

Another allegation of plagiarism concerned Maeterlinck's play Monna Vanna, which was said to have been based on Robert Browning's little-known play Luria.

=== Later life ===
In 1930, he bought a château in Nice, France, and named it Orlamonde, a name occurring in his work Quinze Chansons.

He was made a count by Albert I, King of the Belgians in 1932.

According to an article published in The New York Times in 1940, he arrived in the United States from Lisbon on the Greek Liner Nea Hellas. He had fled to Lisbon in order to escape the Nazi invasion of both Belgium and France. While in Portugal, he stayed in Monte Estoril, at the Grande Hotel, between 27 July and 17 August 1939. The Times quoted him as saying, "I knew that if I was captured by the Germans I would be shot at once, since I have always been counted as an enemy of Germany because of my play, The Mayor of Stilmonde, which dealt with the conditions in Belgium during the German Occupation of 1918." As with his earlier visit to America, he still found Americans too casual, friendly and Francophobic for his taste.

He returned to Nice after the war on 10 August 1947. He was President of PEN International, the worldwide association of writers, from 1947 until 1949. In 1948, the French Academy awarded him the Medal for the French Language. He died in Nice on 6 May 1949 after suffering a heart attack.

== Honours ==
- 1920: Grand Cordon of the Order of Leopold.
- 1932: Admitted by Royal Decree to start the procedure to join the Belgian nobility with the title of count. However, he never fulfilled the obligations to raise the letters patent (including the obligation to create a coat of arms). Since the necessary registrations and tax payments were never fulfilled, he as well as his family were never incorporated into the Belgian nobility.

== Static drama ==
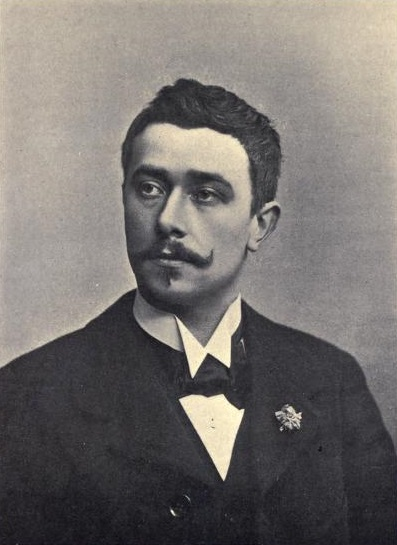
Maeterlinck, before 1905

Maeterlinck's posthumous reputation depends entirely on his early plays (published between 1889 and 1894), which created a new style of dialogue, extremely lean and spare, where what is suggested is more important than what is said. The characters have no foresight, and only a limited understanding of themselves or the world around them. That the characters stumble into tragedy without realizing where they are going may suggest that Maeterlinck thought of man as powerless against the forces of fate, but the kinship is not with ancient Greek tragedy but with modern dramatists such as Beckett and Pinter who bring out human vulnerability in a world beyond our comprehension.

Maeterlinck believed that any actor, due to the hindrance of physical mannerisms and expressions, would inadequately portray the symbolic figures of his plays. He concluded that marionettes were an excellent alternative. Guided by strings operated by a puppeteer, Maeterlinck considered marionettes an excellent representation of fate's complete control over man. He wrote Interior, The Death of Tintagiles, and Alladine and Palomides for marionette theatre.

From this, he gradually developed his notion of the "static drama". He felt that it was the artist's responsibility to create something that did not express human emotions but rather the external forces that compel people. Maeterlinck once wrote that "the stage is a place where works of art are extinguished. ... Poems die when living people get into them."

He explained his ideas on the static drama in his essay "The Tragic in Daily Life" (1896), which appeared in The Treasure of the Humble. The actors were to speak and move as if pushed and pulled by an external force, fate as puppeteer. They were not to allow the stress of their inner emotions to compel their movements. Maeterlinck would often continue to refer to his cast of characters as "marionettes".

Maeterlinck's conception of modern tragedy rejects the intrigue and vivid external action of traditional drama in favour of a dramatisation of different aspects of life:

Othello is admirably jealous. But is it not perhaps an ancient error to imagine that it is at the moments when this passion, or others of equal violence, possesses us, that we live our truest lives? I have grown to believe that an old man, seated in his armchair, waiting patiently, with his lamp beside him; giving unconscious ear to all the eternal laws that reign about his house, interpreting, without comprehending, the silence of doors and windows and the quivering voice of the light, submitting with bent head to the presence of his soul and his destiny—an old man, who conceives not that all the powers of this world, like so many heedful servants, are mingling and keeping vigil in his room, who suspects not that the very sun itself is supporting in space the little table against which he leans, or that every star in heaven and every fiber of the soul are directly concerned in the movement of an eyelid that closes, or a thought that springs to birth—I have grown to believe that he, motionless as he is, does yet live in reality a deeper, more human, and more universal life than the lover who strangles his mistress, the captain who conquers in battle, or "the husband who avenges his honor."

He cites a number of classical Athenian tragedies—which, he argues, are almost motionless and which diminish psychological action to pursue an interest in "the individual, face to face with the universe"—as precedents for his conception of static drama; these include most of the works of Aeschylus and Sophocles' Ajax, Antigone, Oedipus at Colonus, and Philoctetes. With these plays, he claims:

It is no longer a violent, exceptional moment of life that passes before our eyes—it is life itself. Thousands and thousands of laws there are, mightier and more venerable than those of passion; but these laws are silent, and discreet, and slow-moving; and hence it is only in the twilight that they can be seen and heard, in the meditation that comes to us at the tranquil moments of life.

== Maeterlinck in music ==
Pelléas and Mélisande inspired several musical compositions at the turn of the 20th century:

- 1897: a suite for orchestra by William Wallace: Pelleas and Melisande
- 1898: an orchestral suite (sometimes described as incidental music) by Gabriel Fauré: see Pelléas et Mélisande (Fauré) (Op. 80)
- 1893–1902: an opera by Claude Debussy (L. 88, Paris): see Pelléas et Mélisande (opera)
- 1902–1903: a symphonic poem by Arnold Schoenberg (Op. 5)
- 1905: incidental music by Jean Sibelius (Op. 46): see Pelléas et Mélisande (Sibelius)

Other musical works based on Maeterlinck's plays include:

- Aglavaine and Sélysette
  - orchestral prelude by Arthur Honegger
  - orchestral overture by Cyril Scott
- Aladina and Palomid
  - opera by Burghauser
  - opera by Emil František Burian
  - opera by Osvald Chlubna
  - unfinished opera by Anton Webern
- Ariane et Barbe-bleue
  - incidental music by Anatoly Nikolayevich Alexandrov
  - opera in 3 acts by Paul Dukas
- The Betrothal
  - incidental music by Armstrong Gibbs
- The Blind
  - chamber opera Ślepcy by Polish composer Jan Astriab after Maeterlinck's Les aveugles
  - opera by Lera Auerbach
  - opera by Beat Furrer
- The Death of Tintagiles
  - overture by Adam Carse
  - opera by Lawrance Collingwood
  - symphonic poem by Charles Martin Loeffler
  - symphonic poem opus 3 by Jean Absil
  - opera by Jean Nouguès
  - symphonic poem by Francesco Santoliquido
  - orchestral prelude by Alexander Voormolen
  - incidental music by Ralph Vaughan Williams
- Herzgewächse (Foliages of the Heart)
  - Lied for soprano with small ensemble by Arnold Schoenberg
- Intérieur
  - opera by Giedrius Kuprevičius
- L'oiseau bleu
  - 13 scenes for orchestra by Fritz Hart
  - incidental music by Leslie Heward
  - incidental music by Engelbert Humperdinck
  - overture by Kricka
  - incidental music by Norman O'Neill
  - incidental music by Szeligowski
  - opera by Albert Wolff
- Monna Vanna
  - opera in 3 acts by Emil Ábrányi
  - opera in 4 acts by Nicolae Brânzeu
  - Monna Vanna, opera in 4 acts by Henry Février
  - Monna Vanna, unfinished opera by Sergei Rachmaninoff
- Princess Maleine
  - unfinished opera (or incidental music) by Lili Boulanger
  - overture by Pierre de Bréville
  - overture by Cyril Scott
  - incidental music by Maximilian Steinberg
- The Seven Princesses
  - incidental music by Pierre de Bréville
  - opera by Vassili Vassilievitch Netchaïev
  - unfinished opera by Anton Webern
- Sœur Beatrice
  - opera by Alexander Grechaninov
  - chorus by Anatoly Liadov
  - opera Sor Beatriu by Antoni Marquès i Puig
  - incidental music by Erkki Melartin
  - opera by Dimitri Mitropoulos
  - opera by Rasse (composer)
- A piano piece that bears his name, composed by Honorio Siccardi

Additionally, Maeterlinck's essay La vie des abeilles (Note: "The life of the bee") served as inspiration for Igor Stravinsky's "Scherzo fantastique".

== Works ==
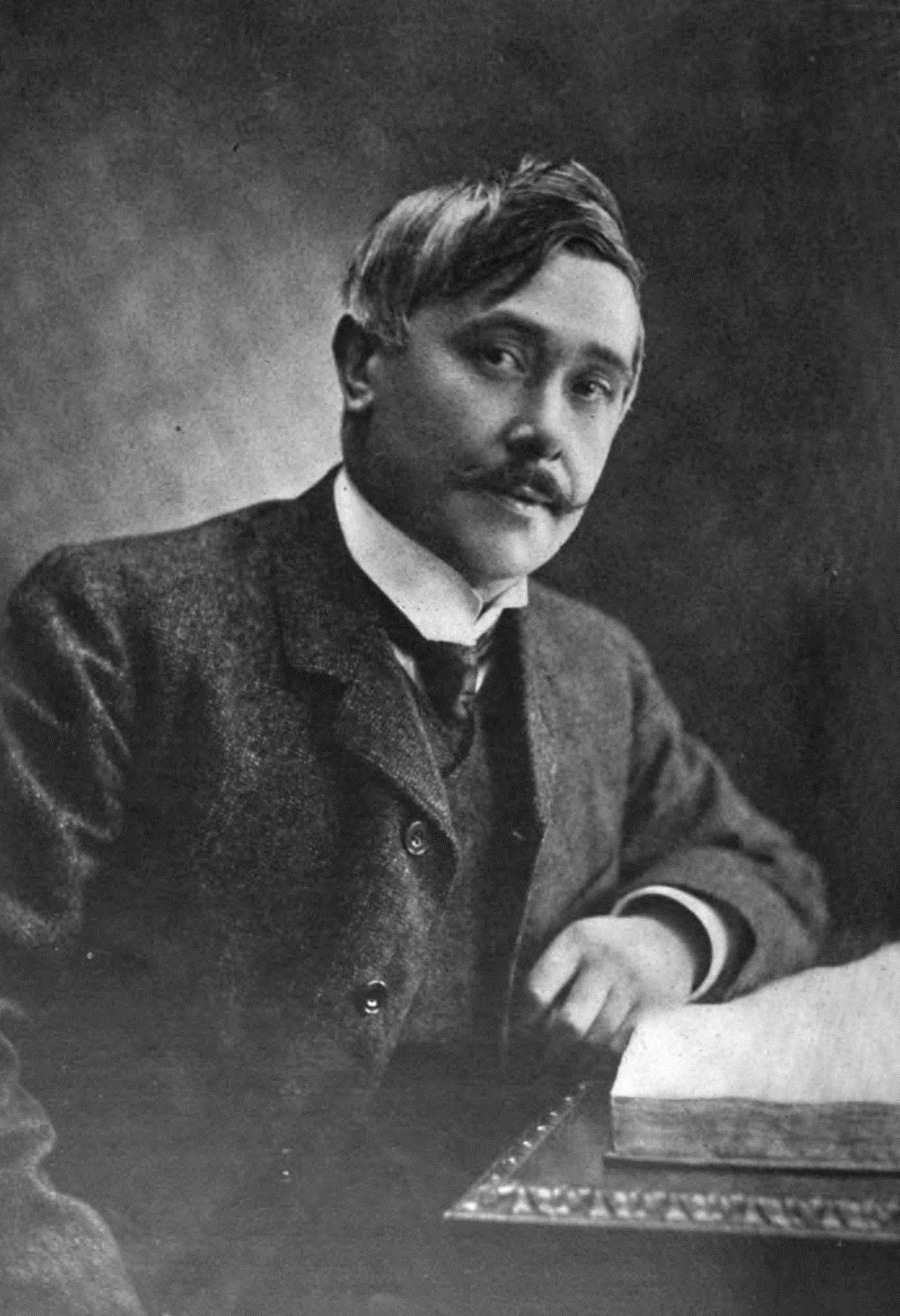
Maeterlinck, c. 1903

=== Poetry ===
- Serres chaudes (1889)
- Douze chansons (1896)
- Quinze chansons (expanded version of Douze chansons) (1900)

=== Drama ===
- La Princesse Maleine (Princess Maleine) (published 1889)
- L'Intruse (Intruder) (published 1890; first performed 21 May 1891)
- Les Aveugles (The Blind) (published 1890; first performed 7 December 1891)
- Les Sept Princesses (The Seven Princesses) (published 1891)
- Pelléas and Mélisande (published 1892; first performed 17 May 1893)
- Alladine et Palomides (published 1894)
- Intérieur (Interior) (published 1894; first performed 15 March 1895)
- La Mort de Tintagiles (The Death of Tintagiles) (published 1894)
- Aglavaine et Sélysette (first performed December 1896)
- Ariane et Barbe-bleue (Ariane and Bluebeard) (first published in German translation, 1899)
- Soeur Béatrice (Sister Beatrice) (published 1901)
- Monna Vanna (first performed May 1902; published the same year)
- Joyzelle (first performed 20 May 1903; published the same year)
- Le Miracle de saint Antoine (The Miracle of Saint Antony) (first performed in German translation, 1904)
- L'Oiseau bleu (The Blue Bird) (first performed 30 September 1908)
- Marie-Magdeleine (Mary Magdalene) (first performed in German translation, February 1910; staged and published in French, 1913)
- Le Bourgmestre de Stilmonde (first performed in Buenos Aires, 1918; an English translation was performed in Edinburgh in 1918; published 1919)
- Les Fiançailles (published 1922)
- Le Malheur passe (published 1925)
- La Puissance des morts (published 1926)
- Berniquel (published 1926)
- Marie-Victoire (published 1927)
- Judas de Kerioth (published 1929)
- La Princess Isabelle (published 1935)
- Jeanne d'Arc (Joan of Arc) (published 1948)
- L'Abbé Sétubal (published 1959)
- Les Trois Justiciers (published 1959)
- Le Jugement dernier (published 1959)
- Le Miracle des mères (first published in book form 2006)

=== Essays ===
- Le Trésor des humbles (The Treasure of the Humble) (1896)
- La sagesse et la destinée (Wisdom and Destiny) (1898)
- Maeterlinck, Maurice (2006) [1901]. La Vie des abeilles [The Life of the Bee]. Translated by Sutro, Alfred. Introduction by Edwin Way Teale. Mineola, NY: Dover Publications. ISBN 978-0-486-45143-5.
- Le temple enseveli (The Buried Temple) (1902)
- Le Double Jardin (The Double Garden, a collection of sixteen essays) (1904)
- L'Intelligence des fleurs (The Intelligence of Flowers) (1907)
- La Mort (Our Eternity, first published in English, incomplete version entitled Death, 1911; in enlarged and complete version in original French, 1913)
- L'Hôte inconnu (first published in English translation, 1914; in original French, 1917)
- Les Débris de la guerre (The Debris of War) (1916); (published in English as The Wrack of the Storm, Alexander Teixeira de Mattos trans., 1916)
- Le grand secret (The Great Secret) (Fasquelle, 1921; Bernard Miall trans., 1922)
- La Vie des termites (The Life of Termites) (1926) Plagiarized version of Die Siel van die Mier (The Soul of the White Ant) by Eugene Marais (1925)
- La Vie de l'espace (The Life of Space) (1928)
- La Grande Féerie (1929)
- La Vie des fourmis (The Life of the Ant) (1930)
- L'Araignée de verre (1932)
- Avant le grand silence (Before the Great Silence) (1934)
- L'Ombre des ailes (The Shadow of Wings) (1936)
- Devant Dieu (1937)
- La Grande Porte (1938)
- L'Autre Monde ou le cadran stellaire (The Other World, or The Star System) (1941)

=== Memoirs ===
- Bulles bleues (1948)

=== Translations ===
Maurice Maeterlinck commemorative coin

- Le Livre des XII béguines and L'Ornement des noces spirituelles, translated from the Flemish of Ruusbroec (1885)
- L'Ornement des noces spirituelles de Ruysbroeck l'admirable (1891)
- Annabella, an adaptation of John Ford's 'Tis Pity She's a Whore (performed 1894)
- Les Disciples à Saïs and Fragments de Novalis from the German of Novalis, together with an Introduction by Maeterlinck on Novalis and German Romanticism (1895)
- Translation and adaptation of Shakespeare's Macbeth (performed 1909)

== See also ==
- The 100th anniversary of Maurice Maeterlinck's greatest contemporary success, his play The Blue Bird, was selected as the main motif of a high-value collectors' coin: the Belgian 50 euro Maurice Maeterlinck commemorative coin, minted in 2008.
- Belgian literature
- Le Bourgmestre de Stilmonde (The Burgomaster of Stilemond) was translated by Alexander Teixeira de Mattos and performed several times in Britain between 1918 and 1927.

== Notes ==
Non-profit organization positions
Preceded by Hu Shih	International President of PEN International; 1947–1949	Succeeded by Benedetto Croce
