= Beatrice Siegrist =

French composer, music educator and organist (born 1934)

Beatrice Houllier Siegrist (born 21 December 1934) is a French composer, music educator, and organist who is best known for winning an Honorable Mention for composition in the Prix de Rome and for her compositions for trombone.

Siegrist was born in Paris. She studied music at the Paris Conservatory and the Ecole Normale de Musique. After graduating, she taught solfege at the Toulouse Conservatory and several other schools in Paris and Toulouse. She also worked as an organist in Paris.

Siegrist won an Honorable Mention in the Prix de Rome and first prize for counterpoint and fugue at the Ecole Normale de Musique. Her music is published by Editions Francaises de Musique and Editions Musicales Transatlantiques. Her compositions include:

== Chamber ==
- Essai (two percussion)
- Five Pieces (trombone and piano)
- Le Plaisir du Tromboniste (piano and trombone; transcribed from cantatas by Johann Sebastian Bach; revised by Camille Verdier)
- Suite (four trombones)
- Tarantelle (three wind instruments)
- Three Pieces (trumpet and piano)
- Trucs in B Flat (clarinet and piano)
- Two Pieces (flute and piano)
- Variations on a Chorale by Martin Luther (unspecified winds)

== Vocal ==
- Chorus for Three Equal Voices
- “Melodies” (text by Paul Fort)
- “Soleils Couchants” (text by Paul Verlaine)
