= Le Jardin clos =

Song cycle by Gabriel Fauré

- Song cycle by Gabriel Fauré
- The composer in 1907
- Opus: 106
- Text: Poems from Entrevisions by Charles van Lerberghe
- Language: French
- Composed: 1914
- Performed: 28 January 1915
- Published: 1915
- Movements: eight
- Scoring: voice and piano

Le Jardin clos, Op. 106, is a song cycle by Gabriel Fauré, of eight mélodies for voice and piano. It is based on eight poems from the collection Entrevisions by Charles van Lerberghe. Fauré composed the cycle in 1914, starting it in Germany and continuing in Switzerland and France after he fled Germany on the outbreak of World War I.

== Composition ==
The song cycle was composed over the period July to November 1914. Fauré wrote the first song, "Exaucement", during his stay of 21–30 July at Bad Ems, where he hoped to improve his health, particularly his hearing impairment. Then, with war breaking out, he made his way from Germany back to France via Switzerland, travelling via Saint-Louis, Basel and Geneva. Fauré continued to compose the cycle at Geneva and Paris, and also at Pau, which he visited in October.

== Settings ==
Fauré's settings are as follows:

1. "Exaucement"
2. "Quand tu plonges tes yeux dans mes yeux"
3. "La Messagère"
4. "Je me poserai sur ton cœur"
5. "Dans la nymphée"
6. "Dans la pénombre"
7. "Il m'est cher, amour, le bandeau"
8. "Inscription sur le sable"

The cycle's overall title was taken from the second section of Van Lerberghe's Entrevisions, which has Latin epigraphs drawn from the Biblical Song of Songs, although only three poems from that appeared in the cycle, the rest being selected from other sections. The title of Le Jardin clos (the closed garden) evokes the small world of the Garden of Eden, while the eroticism of the epigraphs informs the spirit of Fauré's work.

== Premiere ==
Le Jardin clos had its premiere at the Concerts Casella on 28 January 1915, sung by Claire Croiza. The pianist was Fauré.

The song cycle was published by Durand in May 1915. Fauré gave the songs individual dedications; "Dans la nymphée" was dedicated to Croiza.

== Sources ==
- Johnson, Graham (2009). Gabriel Fauré: The Songs and their Poets. London: Guildhall School of Music and Drama. ISBN 978-0-7546-5960-0.
- Nectoux, Jean-Michel (2004). Gabriel Fauré: A Musical Life. Cambridge: Cambridge University Press. ISBN 0-521-61695-6.
- Orledge, Robert (1979). Gabriel Fauré. London: Eulenburg Books. ISBN 0-903873-40-0.
