= Princess Maleine =

Play written by Maurice Maeterlinck

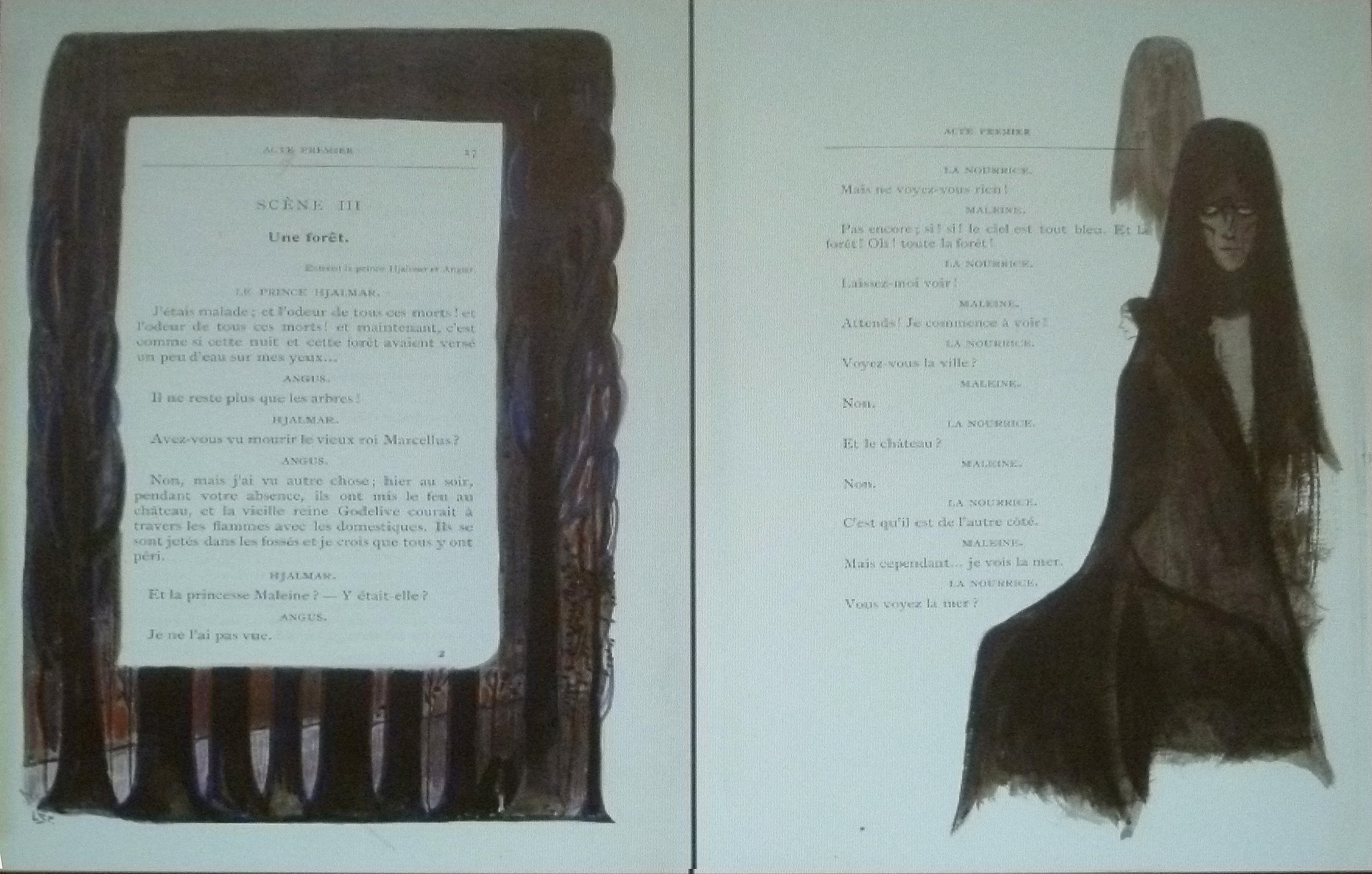
- La Princesse Maleine - illustrations by Léon Spilliaert (1903)
- Written by: Maurice Maeterlinck
- Original language: French
- Genre: Fairy tale drama

Princess Maleine (French: La Princesse Maleine) is a play by Belgian playwright Maurice Maeterlinck. It was the author's first play. It is an adaptation of the Brothers Grimm's Maid Maleen.

== Publication ==
The play was first published in serial form in La Société Nouvelle, a Brussels periodical. Since Maeterlinck desired the play be published in book form, his mother tightened her budget and gave him 250 francs. The play was printed in December, 1889.

Maeterlinck mailed a copy of his play to Stéphane Mallarmé, from whom it was eventually passed to Octave Mirbeau, who wrote a very warm review of the work in August 1890 for Le Figaro. In the review he said the play was "superior in beauty to what is most beautiful in Shakespeare."

After this rapturous reception, two invitations were offered to produce the play in France in October 1890: first from Paul Fort, director of the experimental Symbolist 'Théâtre Mixte' – soon to become the 'Théâtre d'Art' – and second from André Antoine, director of the 'Théâtre Libre', associated with Naturalism on the Parisian stage. Maeterlinck gave permission, rather oddly, to Antoine rather than Fort, writing to him that 'Princess Maleine is yours, and, to my mind, always has been. You will put on the play this year or in ten years or never, as you wish. It will wait, and will belong only to you.'

Shortly afterward, Maeterlinck withdrew the offer. But this was a bungle that prevented any live stage production of his first play until well after his death. Paul Fort and his associate Lugné-Poë quickly penned a public letter insisting that Antoine or no-one would be the first director of Princess Maleine. As a result, Maeterlinck's first play wasn't performed by professional actors in France until 1962, although there were several puppet productions shortly after publication.

== List of characters ==
- Hjalmar, king of one part of Holland
- Prince Hjalmar, his son
- Marcellus, king of another part of Holland
- Godeliva, his wife
- Princess Maleine, their daughter
- Anne, queen of Jutland
- Little Allan, her son
- Princess Uglyane, her daughter
- Angus, friend of Prince Hjalmar
- Stephano, officer of Marcellus
- Vanox, officer of Marcellus
- Nurse to Maleine
- A chamberlain
- A physician
- A madman
- Seven nuns
- A big black dog named Pluto
- Lords, officers, a cowherd, a cook, a cripple, peasants, servants, etc.

== Synopsis ==
Princess Maleine is expected to marry Prince Hjalmar, whose father is old and senile. Her father King Marcellus and King Hjalmar have a misunderstanding. She refuses to abandon her love for Hjalmar, and is locked in a tower while war erupts and her entire family is killed. She escapes with her nurse and, concealing her identity, becomes a servant in the house of Hjalmar. She learns that the prince is now affianced to Uglyane, whose mother the mysterious Queen Anne has seduced old King Hjalmar. Queen Anne, upon discovering Maleine's identity, coaxes King Hjalmar into helping her kill the princess. Outraged, Prince Hjalmar kills Anne and then himself.

== Themes ==
A salient theme in Princess Maleine is decline. Maeterlinck believed that man was completely powerless against a higher force, which exercised its will upon the world. Thus, the characters are submitted to the will of their natural surroundings, and seem unable to control the events in their own lives. Uglyane is completely dominated by her mother, and barely has a voice in the play at all. Prince Hjalmir is a coward. King Hjalmir is an old, sickly, senile figure. He resembles other kings in literature who are feeble, like Shakespeare's King Lear. He personifies decline and the waning years of a weak authority.

Chaos is also an underlying theme. As Maleine wanders through the woods, the forest symbolizes chaos as it is dark and full of unseen predators. Whenever there is a juxtaposition of dark and light in the story, chaos ensues. The play ends in chaos, for there is no moral or championing of social values.

Since Princess Maleine is set in a vague time and place, it resembles a fairy tale.
