= The Blind (play) =

Play written by Maurice Maeterlinck

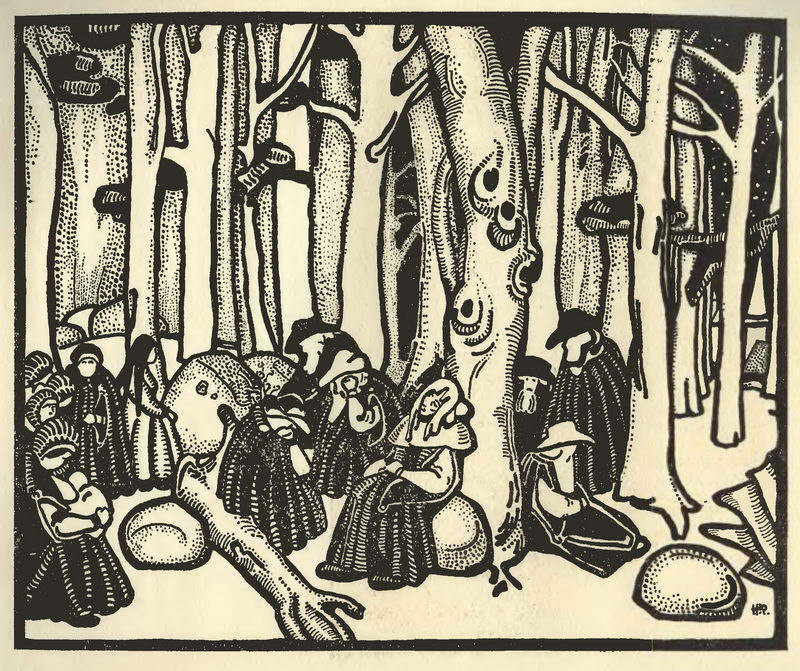
- A 1906 illustration of the play by Nicholas Roerich
- Original language: French
- Written by: Maurice Maeterlinck
- Genre: Symbolism

Premiere
- Date: 7 December 1891

The Blind (French: Les aveugles), also known as The Sightless, is a play that was written in 1890 by the Belgian playwright Maurice Maeterlinck.

== Information ==
It is an intense one-act play, which was one of the pieces mentioned in a list of Maeterlinck’s most characteristic plays. This list was highlighted in the speech given to honour Maeterlinck with the Nobel Prize in 1911. The play was originally written in French later to be translated into several different languages, such as English and German. The piece is not only a study of human condition in general but it appears to confront its reader with the effect of hope on the latter.

Unlike most other theatrical pieces The Blind does not introduce its readers to readily shaped characters, but twelve de-personalised beings. These beings were not provided with names but titles describing their general condition, for instance the eldest blind man. This method of writing gives an audience, or theatre professional an opportunity to read between the lines and interpret the piece according to personal desire. Maeterlinck has since been considered as the founder of a new type of dramatic writing, Symbolism. Parallels have often been drawn with Samuel Beckett’s Waiting for Godot, which was produced in the mid 20th century and appears to construct a similar world of waiting and hoping, which is evident in The Blind.

== Translations and sources ==
- The Blind, translated by Richard Hovey (1894?)
- The Sightless, translated by Lawrence Alma-Tadema (1895?)
- Three Pre-Surrealist Plays: "The Blind", "Ubu the King", "The Mammaries of Tiresias" translated by Maya Slater (1997)
- I ciechi, translated in Italian by Momo Longarelli (1913), edited by Casa Editrice Humanitas, in Bari
