= Pelléas and Mélisande =

Play by Maurice Maeterlinck

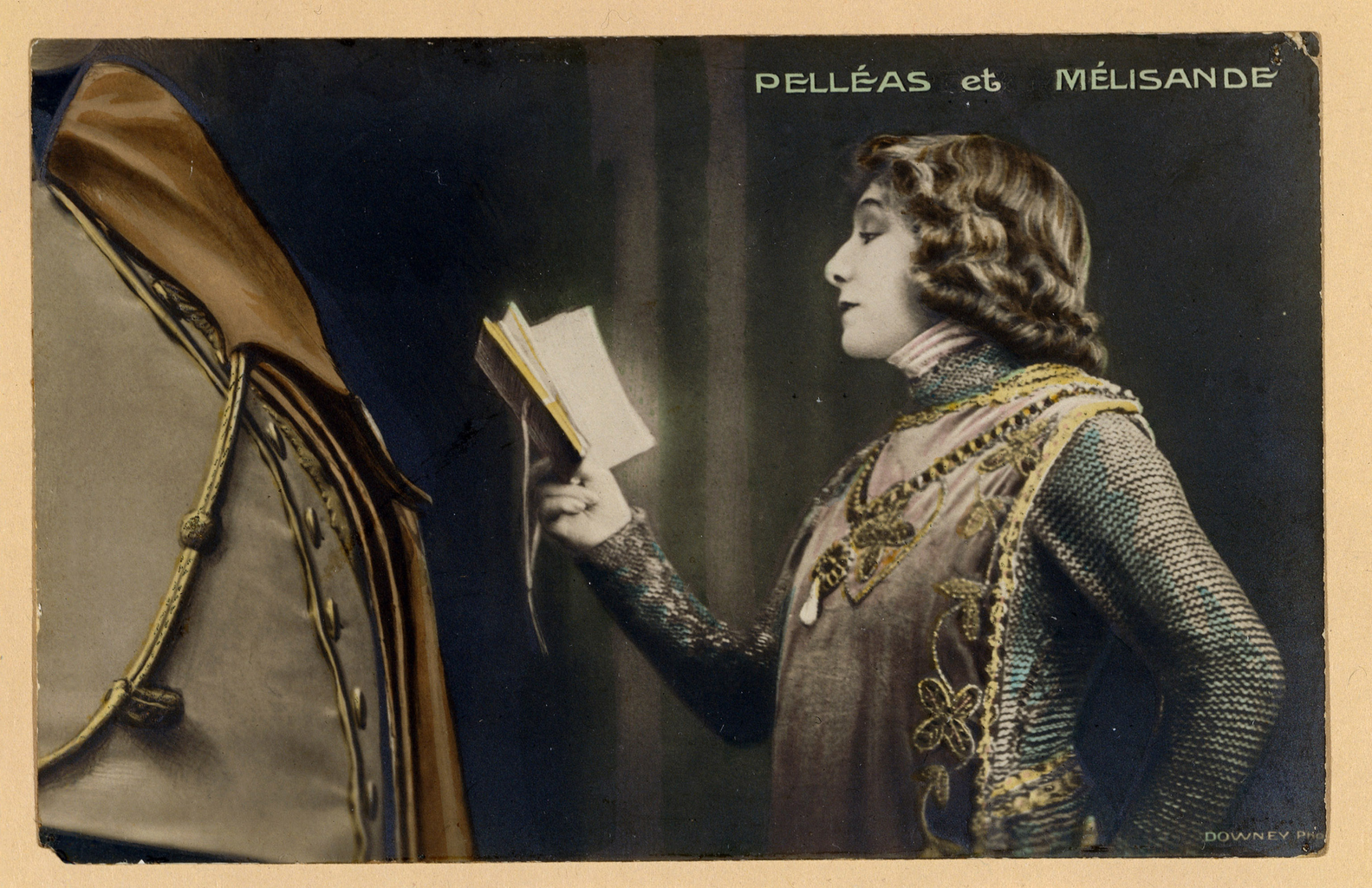
- Sarah Bernhardt in Pelléas et Mélisande
- Written by: Maurice Maeterlinck
- Characters: Arkël, king of Allemonde; Geneviève, mother of Pelléas and Golaud; Pelléas, grandson of Arkël; Golaud, grandson of Arkël; Mélisande; Little Yniold, son of Golaud (by a former marriage); Physician; Porter; Servants; Beggars
- Genre: Symbolism

Premiere
- Date: 17 May 1893

Pelléas and Mélisande (French: Pelléas et Mélisande) is a Symbolist play by the Belgian playwright and author Maurice Maeterlinck, first performed in 1893. The play is about the forbidden, doomed love of the title characters.

The work never achieved great success on stage, apart from the operatic setting by Claude Debussy, but was at the time widely read and admired by the symbolist literary elite, such as Strindberg and Rilke. It inspired other contemporary composers, like Gabriel Fauré, Arnold Schoenberg, Jean Sibelius, and Mel Bonis.

== Synopsis ==
Golaud finds Mélisande by a stream in the woods. She has lost her crown in the water but does not wish to retrieve it. They marry, and she instantly wins the favor of Arkël, Golaud's grandfather and king of Allemonde, who is ill. She begins to be drawn to Pelléas, Golaud's brother. They meet by the fountain, where Mélisande loses her wedding ring. Golaud grows suspicious of the lovers, has his son Yniold spy on them, and discovers them caressing, whereupon he kills Pelléas and wounds Mélisande. She later dies after giving birth to an abnormally small girl.

== Themes ==
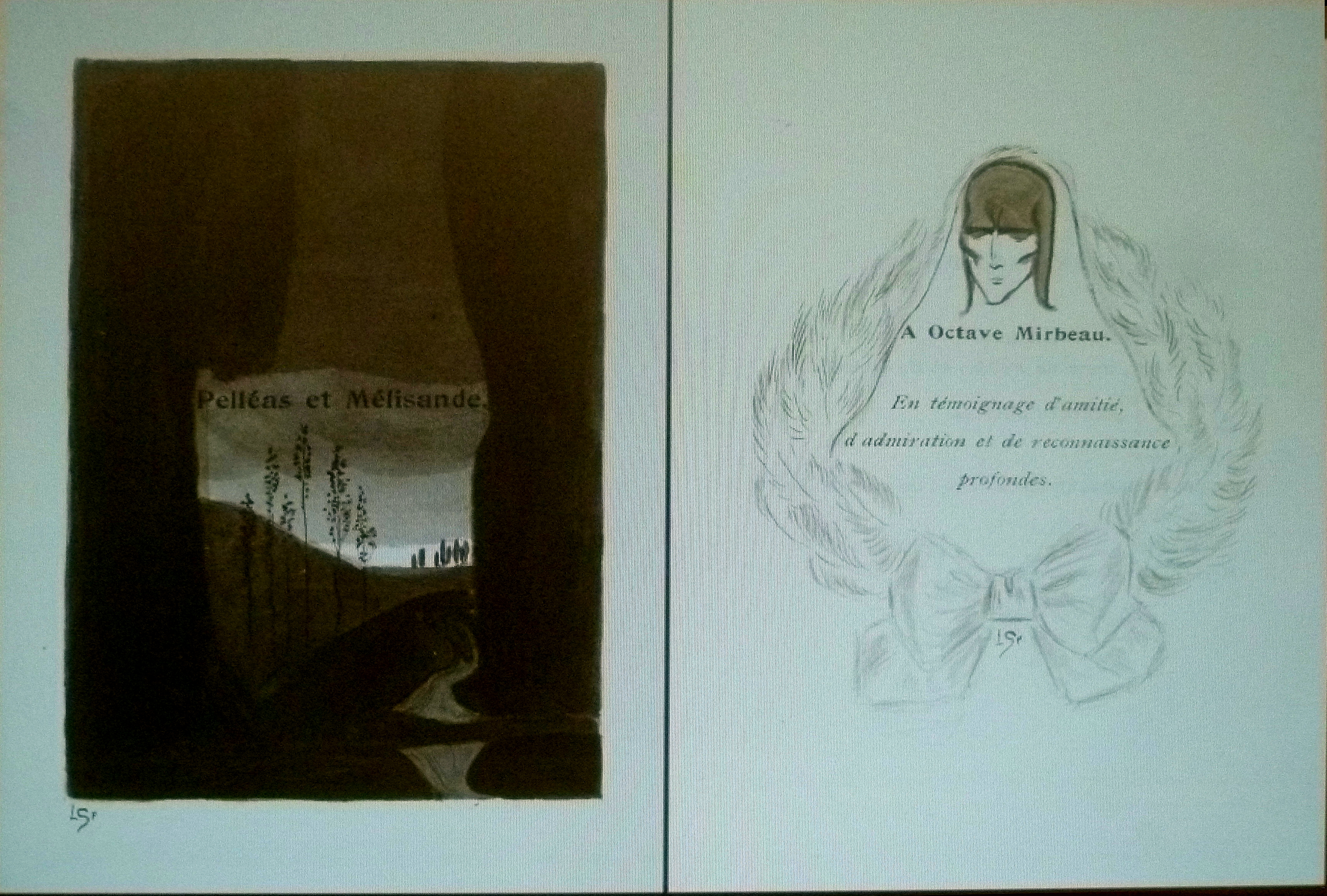
Pelléas et Mélisande – illustrations by Léon Spilliaert (1903)

This play treats the familiar triangle of wife, husband and lover, but in which the husband and lover are brothers. It ends with the death of both the wife and the lover at the hands of the husband. The best known example of this triangle is the story of Paolo and Francesca of Rimini, treated in two highly successful plays also dating to the 1890s by Gabriele D'Annunzio and the English playwright Stephen Phillips.

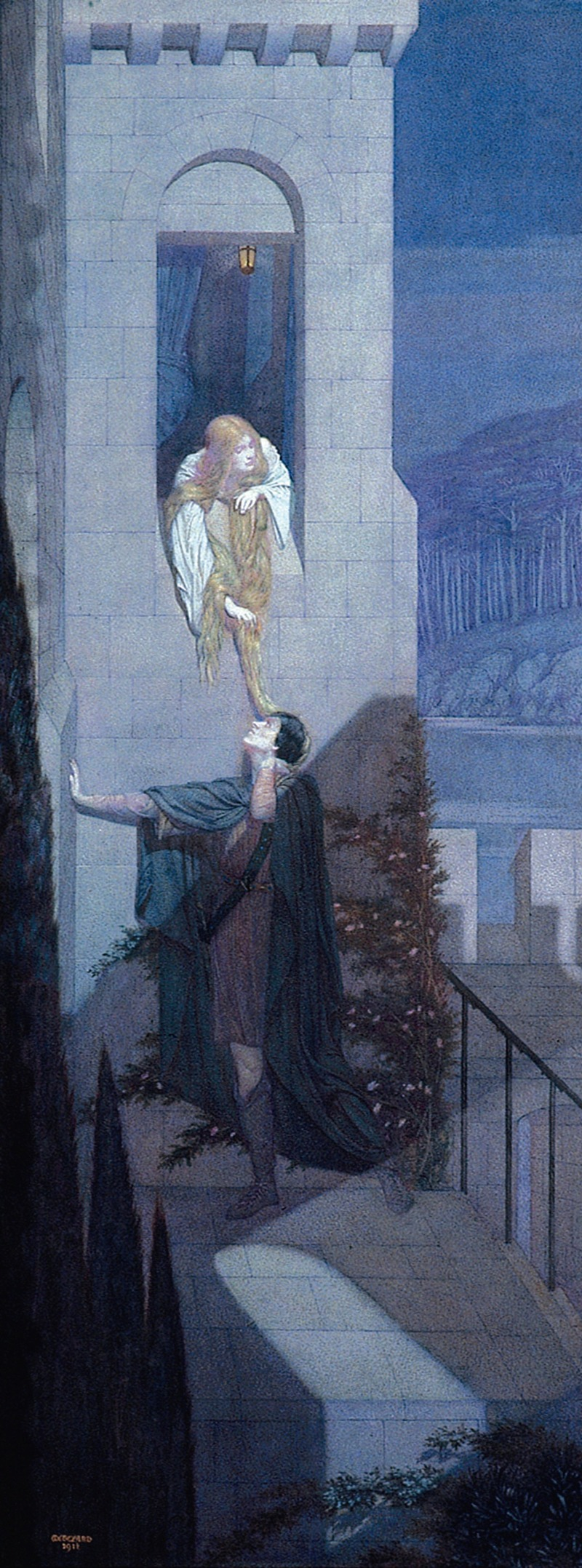
Elleas And Melisande (1913) by English artist Sidney Harold Meteyard

At the beginning of the play Mélisande has just escaped from a failed marriage that has so traumatized her that she scarcely remembers either it or her past. She marries Golaud with no choice of her own, and remains essentially distant from him. The audience realize she is falling in love with Pelléas long before she does. On her deathbed she has quite forgotten her final meeting with Pelléas and his death, and dies without realizing that she is dying. This and the whole play—for none of the other characters are wiser—express a sense that human beings understand neither themselves nor each other nor the world. The problem is not simply human blindness, but the lack of a fixed and definable reality to be known. This is the Maeterlinck who paved the way for the plays of Samuel Beckett.

A key element in the play is the setting, whether visible in the stage scenery or described in the dialogue. The action takes place in an ancient, decaying castle, surrounded by deep forest, which only occasionally lets sunlight in, and with caverns underneath it that breathe infected air and are in danger of collapse. As numerous critics have pointed out, all this symbolizes the dominating power throughout the action of a destiny fatal to mankind.

== Premiere ==
Pelléas and Mélisande premiered on 17 May 1893 at the Bouffes-Parisiens under the direction of Aurélien Lugné-Poe. Lugné-Poe, possibly taking inspiration from The Nabis, an avant-garde group of Symbolist painters, used very little lighting on the stage. He also removed the footlights. He placed a gauze veil across the stage, giving the performance a dreamy and otherworldly effect. This was the antithesis to the realism popular in French theatre at the time.

Maeterlinck was so nervous on the night of the premiere that he did not attend. Critics derided the performance, but Maeterlinck's peers received it more positively. Octave Mirbeau, to whom Maeterlinck dedicated his play, was impressed with the work, which stimulated a new direction in stage design and theatre performance.

== Musical derivatives ==
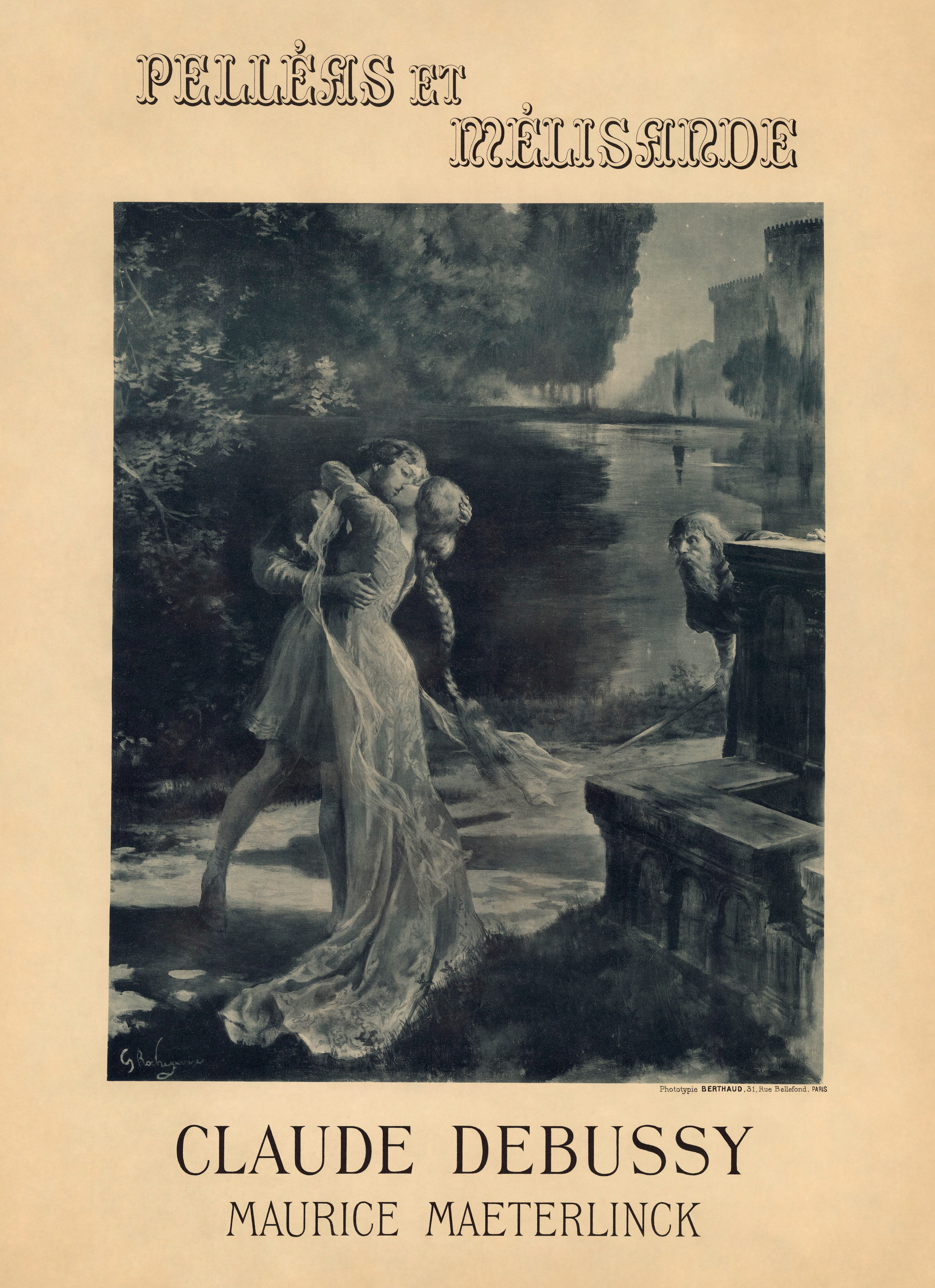
Poster for Claude Debussy's 1902 opera based on the play

The play has been the basis of several pieces of music. Perhaps the best known is the opera of the same name (1902) by Claude Debussy. In 1898, Gabriel Fauré had written incidental music for performances of the play in London and asked Charles Koechlin to orchestrate it, from which he later extracted a suite. The story inspired Arnold Schoenberg's early symphonic poem Pelleas und Melisande of 1902–03. Jean Sibelius also wrote incidental music for it in 1905.
