= Richard Faith =

American composer (1926–2021)

Richard Faith (March 20, 1926 - February 28, 2021) was an American composer who has been known primarily in university music circles as a concert pianist, professor of piano, and a published composer of piano pedagogy literature, orchestral and chamber works, opera and most prolifically, song. A neo-romantic, Faith has always been first and foremost a melodist.

== Biography ==
Richard Bruce Faith was born in Evansville, Indiana. His mother was a homemaker active in community affairs, and his father, a dentist. Both parents were very supportive of his choice to become a musician as they too came from musical backgrounds. Faith's mother studied piano before her five children were born; his father picked up musical skills without a teacher and played piano, violin and sang in the church choir. Around age eight, Richard began to study piano with his fifteen-year-old cousin and he soon began improvising melodies on the keyboard. Between the ages of eleven and twelve he began writing down his piano compositions, one of which later became a work for women's chorus entitled "Daffodils" (I Wandered Lonely as a Cloud) with poetry by William Wordsworth.

Before his natural bent toward composing could take root and grow, Faith embarked on a career as a concert pianist. In 1940 at age fourteen, he appeared with the Evansville Philharmonic Orchestra, and after a few years of study he entered Chicago Musical College, where he received both undergraduate and master's degrees in piano performance. At age nineteen he placed in a collegiate contest and was given the opportunity to perform in Chicago's Orchestra Hall. The work was Chopin's Concerto in F Minor (Op. 21). This was followed in 1947 by his professional debut at Kimball Hall (Chicago) and, in 1948, by a return to Orchestra Hall for a solo recital and an engagement with the Chicago Symphony Orchestra. During the early fifties Faith concertized as a recital accompanist for both singers and instrumentalists in programs that included his own compositions.

Faith's first instructor in composition was Max Wald, with whom he worked from 1947 to 1949. In the Fall of 1954 he began doctoral work in composition at Indiana University in Bloomington with Bernhard Heiden. Two years later Faith received his first full-time teaching appointment at Morningside College in Sioux City, Iowa. Although he was devoted to teaching piano, his great love for composition continued to flourish. In 1960 he went to Rome as a Fulbright Scholar, studying both piano and composition with Guido Agosti at the Accademia Nazionale di Santa Cecilia. He chose Italy because of his interest in Italian history and its early Renaissance art. He also was seeking the "clarity of Italian musical expression."

Faith spent the greatest part of his life at the University of Arizona in Tucson, where he assumed the position of Assistant Professor of Music (Piano) in 1961. He remained at the school until 1988, with an interim year at Morningside College in 1968. Many of his most popular compositions are the fruits of his tenure at Arizona: songs, choral works, piano concertos, orchestral and chamber works and opera.

Faith's first published work was the "Legend for Piano," printed by Summy-Birchard in 1967. Shawnee Press began publishing his compositions in 1968, followed by G. Schirmer Inc. in 1971 and Belwin Mills in 1974. In the late 1970s Faith's music achieved significant recognition with performances in London, Washington, D.C., and Tucson, and commercial recordings were released. From 1982 to 1988 he received annual awards from the American Society of Composers, Authors and Publishers (ASCAP).

Following his retirement from teaching in 1988, Richard Faith relocated from Tucson a number of times. Ever the itinerant musician, he was not content to settle in one place for very long. To freely quote the Yeats poem that he eventually set to music, Faith can be described as a "wandering Aengus" with a "fire in his head." He lived in Reston, Virginia, in California, Bloomington, Indiana, returning to his home town of Evansville in the late 1990s, and in Denver. In 2015 he made his home in Savoy, Illinois where he gave piano recitals at his independent retirement community and continued to compose up until two weeks before his death. During the last 30 years performances, publications, dissertations and recordings of his works have flourished. His vast musical output includes over 60 chamber works, 21 choral arrangements, 4 operas, 16 orchestral pieces, 61 keyboard works and over 120 songs, including an unofficial contribution to the AIDS Quilt Songbook with his "Winter Journey," with poetry by William Lavonis. Faith's musical works and documents are being housed at the Fred Fox School of Music in the College of Fine Arts at the University of Arizona-Tucson.

Richard Faith died at his home on February 28, 2021, in Savoy twenty days shy of his 95th birthday.

== Musical style and songs ==
Faith's music displays a freely modulating harmonic language within the boundaries of tonality that combines neo-romantic and impressionistic qualities. With Debussy, Ravel, and Rachmaninoff as important influences on his music, and Brahms as a model with respect to form, Faith also shares musical traits with Vaughan Williams, particularly in the areas of modality and harmonic color and with Roger Quilter, the Victorian whose songs displayed a trait known as "decorous Romanticism." Faith's English flavor is even further highlighted by the composer's choice of poetry, much of which comes from English and Irish authors. Having developed a somewhat dry wit and an infectious, silly humor, Faith infrequently reflected these personality traits in his music, leaning more toward a sound that exudes a deep longing and romantic spirit.

Faith's song output spans the years 1944 to the present—his entire life as a composer. The over 120 settings run the stylistic gamut from sophisticated concert pieces to simple miniatures, duets, vocalises and selections with obbligato instruments, including flute, cello, viola and harp. His settings are generally for medium voice. Some have been written for specific singers to whom he has dedicated the music. Many of the songs are grouped according to subject matter, but are not necessarily musically connected. They may be sung as sets or separately, and may be transposed to suit the singer. Faith's tempo indications use traditional Italian terminology and the metronome markings are only suggestions. He is a gracious composer who allows individuals to develop their own interpretations of his music.

Because Faith himself is a pianist, many of the songs have sophisticated accompaniments. Sometimes the piano doubles the voice, though hardly ever through an entire piece. At other times the piano will play a countermelody to the voice to form a kind of obbligato. Like Debussy, Faith has a fondness for triplets, because of the movement and flow they add to a song. Thomas Nashe's "Spring, the Sweet Spring" (1950) is an exercise in perpetual motion for the accompanist, with only brief repose at the end of each stanza. This inventive, florid accompaniment, along with Faith's strict use of ABA form, thin texture, and a definite key signature (G) lend a neo-baroque character to this Elizabethan poem. The harmony, however, remains contemporary, with Faith's use of incidental chromatics and added-note chords.

Like many composers who rely on modality rather than tonality, Faith rarely uses key signatures. His harmonic idiom displays a changing palette of colors marked by simultaneous cross-relations, the Lydian sharped fourth, and combinations of this sharped fourth and Mixolydian flatted seventh. Faith has denied any desire to pursue more avant-garde idioms. Earlier experiments in progressive styles met with little success, and if anything beyond the romantic exists in Faith's music, it may be the influence of Hindemith which was furthered by his studies at Indiana University with Bernhard Heiden, himself a Hindemith pupil. Traces of this influence can be discerned in the appearance of quartal/quintal harmony in many of the songs. This is seen in "The Blackbird" by the Victorian author William Ernest Henley composed in 1955. The accompaniment begins with broken ninth and tenth intervals supported by mildly dissonant chords; it is then followed by a hocket-like passage. This underlying texture continues through the first half of the song, contrasting with legato vocal melody.

Faith's use of arch form or "coming full circle" reflects the influence of Brahms, whose many songs fall into this structural category. He may end with a literal repeat, a transposed portion, or only a fragment of A, and may repeat text, music, or both in the process. Arch form is also reflected in the use of dynamics. Many songs begin quietly, reach a climax in an interior section, and then end as they began.

The composer's selection of poetry brings to the foreground some of literature's most famous writers in works that in this day and age have been unjustly neglected by the general public: Conrad Aiken, Edward Lear, Charles Cotton, and Christina Rossetti, to name a few. In his later years Faith began to set more diverse poets, including Moorish, Islamic and Chinese authors. That Faith is well-read is apparent not only in his choice of fine poetry to set to music, but also in his allusions to literature in many of his instrumental works. In addition, he often selects longer poems than would be considered usual for a song and writes few miniatures. The success of setting a lengthy piece of verse seems to depend upon Faith's ability to delay the listener's climactic expectations by moving through harmonic ambiguity until reaching an emotionally charged section that merits a cadence—usually on open sonorities without the thirds. This event may repeat itself many times with a greater or lesser dynamic level, thereby expanding his music resources.

Faith's songs adhere strictly to the rhythm dictated by the text of the poem. In fact, he simultaneously composes both melody and accompaniment by singing the text and playing the keyboard and immediately writing it down. Faith's adherence to the text rhythm results in shifting meters to accommodate phrases of varying length and text-derived rhythmic figures often provide the basis for his accompaniments

For subject matter Faith prefers nature imagery over love poetry and until 1994 with his Mother Goose Rhymes, there had been only one comical song—Edward Lear's "The Owl and the Pussycat," written in 1960. Many of Faith's settings reflect the nationality of the poet and the time period in which the poem was written. For example, Four Love Songs on Elizabethan lyrics (1982) display thin textures, balanced forms, and traditional harmonic progressions, while the Jean de La Ville de Mirmont fr:Jean de La Ville de Mirmont songs have a French character that reveals Faith's debt to Ravel and Debussy. More recently, Faith's songs on Moorish poetry evoke an exotic, middle eastern quality. In the beautiful setting of Ben Jonson's "To Celia" (commonly known as "Drink to Me Only with Thine Eyes"), Faith, by stressing the poem's inherent passion, brings a fresh outlook to a lyric which had become too familiar in arrangements of the old English setting. He achieves this through an operatically conceived vocal line: high and sustained, and encompassing a range of an octave and a fifth.

Two works that do not necessarily fall into specific stylistic categories, but deserve mention nonetheless, are Percy Bysshe Shelley's "Music When Soft Voices Die" and the miniature "Remember Me" by the Victorian Christina Rossetti. The spontaneous quality of the Shelley song reveals the poem's great effect on Faith, who, after nearly two years without song writing (1957), produced one of his most frequently performed pieces. The introduction's angular, twisting melody, taken later by the vocal line, lends a troubled, unsettling quality to the lyric. "Remember Me" was written in 1954 and is unusual for its brevity. The poet, Christina Rossetti, was an Englishwoman of Italian descent and is best known for her words to the hymns "In the Bleak Mid-Winter" and "Love Came Down at Christmas." Faith set three more of her poems which are included in the first published volume of songs by Leyerle Publications.

Many of Faith's songs have themes related to the sea, and there are a number of others in which the sea figures as an integral element in the poem. This stems from the composer"s extreme fascination with water, having been raised near the high banks of the wide Ohio River in Evansville, Indiana. "Sea Fever" (John Masefield), one of Faith's few biographically influenced songs, displays such a depth of emotion rare for a nineteen-year-old. It is an important early song because it established many compositional techniques to which the composer returned throughout his lyrical output. Another "sea" example is "Ships" an English translation of "Vaisseaux, nous vous aurons aimés" by Jean de la Ville de Mirmont fr:Jean de La Ville de Mirmont, the French World War I poet killed in action in 1914. This poem was also set by Fauré in that composer's final song cycle L'horizon chimérique. Faith's song is scored for cello obbligato, piano, and female voice.

Faith skillfully translates into music the emotions behind the words of the world's greatest authors. Although many of his songs display common characteristics, each reveals an approach that allows the poem's individuality to shine through. Performers of art song, both singers and pianists, will appreciate Faith's output, considering the variety of poems he set to music and the gracious way he treats the voice and piano in his neo-romantic/impressionistic manner. Somewhat reticent of theoretical discussions, however, Faith considers himself only to be a composer of the heart, who relies on his musical gifts to bring joy to others.

== Selected works ==
=== Chamber and instrumental music ===
- Air, for saxophone and piano
- Andante and Allegro, for bassoon and piano, 2011*
- Chant and Movement, for viola and piano, 2002*
- Concerto for Clarinet and Piano, 1989; Southern Music Co.
- Concerto for Two Pianos and Percussion
- Doric Dances, for cor anglais (or alto saxophone) and piano, 2000
- Elegy, for clarinet and piano, 1950*
- Elegy, for clarinet choir
- Essays, for oboe and piano, 1964
- Evocation, for trombone and piano, arr. from "Music I Heard With You", 1987*
- Evocations, for trumpet (Bb or C) and piano, 2006
- Fables, for viola and piano, 1974*
- Fantasy, for violin and piano
- Fantasy Trio No. 1, for violin, clarinet or oboe and piano, 1982
- Fantasy Trio No. 2, for violin, clarinet and piano, 1988
- Four Duets, for violin and cello
- Harvest Song, for baritone and woodwind quintet
- Highland Sketches, for baritone saxophone and piano, 2011*
- Incantations, for soprano, viola and piano, 1994
- Miniatures, for clarinet and piano, 1992; Belwin Mills
- Miniatures, for oboe and piano, 1988; Belwin Mills
- Moorish Dances, for violin, percussion and piano, 2002
- Movements, for horn and piano, 1966; Shawnee Press
- Oboe Concerto, 1982
- Pastorale, for cor anglais (or alto saxophone) and piano, 2000
- Phantasies, for saxophone and piano, 1985
- Poems, for cello and piano (based on Four Faith Songs), 1984
- Quintet for Flute, Clarinet, Violin, Cello and Harp, 1956
- Rhapsody for Cello and Piano, 1960*
- Rhapsody for Flute and Piano, 2007
- Rhapsody for Violin and Piano in Four Movements, 1954–55*
- Romance, for violin and piano, 1952*
- Second Fantasy Trio, for violin, clarinet and piano, 1995
- Sextet for Wind Quintet and Piano, 2001
- The Solitary Reaper, for baritone and woodwind quintet
- Sonata for Cello and Piano, 1985
- Sonata for Flute and Piano, 1957
- Sonata for Trumpet and Piano, 1957
- Sonata No. 2 for Trumpet and Piano, 1985
- Sonata for Viola and Piano
- Sonata for Violin and Piano, 1948*
- String Quartet, 1955*
- Suite for Bassoon and Piano, 1989; Southern Music Co.
- Suite for Clarinet and Piano, 2007
- Three Duets for Violin and Viola
- Three Nocturnes for Violin and Piano, 1970*
- Three Pieces for Oboe and Piano
- Trio for Flute, Cello and Harp, 1984
- Trio for Oboe, Bassoon and Piano, 2003
- Trio for Violin, Cello and Piano, 1965
- Trio for Violin, Horn and Piano
- Two Pieces for Brass
- Two Poems, for voice, violin, cello and piano (Mirmont), arr. 2010
- Two Romances, for violin and piano
- Two Songs, for violin and piano, 2000*
- Two Sea Pieces, for clarinet and piano, 1966
- Various pieces for clarinet and piano (Air, Eventide, Harlequin, Serenade), 1987*
- Woodwind Quintet

* unpublished

=== Choral ===
- All Day I Hear the Noise of Waters, for SSA and piano (James Joyce), 1966
- The Blackbird, for SATB and piano (William Ernest Henley), 1965
- Creation, cantata for soloists and SSATBB, 1993
- Daffodils, for SSA and piano (William Wordsworth), 1970
- God Be in my Head, for SATB and piano, 1990
- Hymn of Praise, for SATB and piano or organ, 1989
- Indian Summer, for SATB and piano (Wilfred Campbell), 1964
- Kyrie, for SATB and string orchestra (organ version), 1990
- Mass (Missa Hominum), for SATB, soloists and piano,1986
- Music I Heard With You, for SATB and piano (Conrad Aiken), 1968; G. Schirmer
- O Spirit of the Summertime, for SATB and piano or string quartet (William Allingham), 1970
- On the Isle of Skye, for TTBB (Richard Faith), 1986
- Remember Me, various vocal arrangements (Christina Rossetti), 2003, 2006
- Sea Fever, for TBB and piano (John Masefield) 1965; for SATB and piano, 1980
- Sleep Child, from The Little Match Girl, for SATB and piano (Michael Ard), 1994
- Sonnet 54, for TTBB (William Shakespeare), 1986
- Spring, the Sweet Spring, for TTBB (Thomas Nashe), 1986
- Though I Speak, for SATB and piano (St. Paul), 1991
- The Waters of Babylon, cantata in 4 movements, for baritone solo, SATB chorus and piano (Jeremiah, Isaiah), 1976
- The Wayfarer, for SATB and violin, viola, cello, horn and piano (Rainer Maria Rilke), 1996
- What Sweeter Music, for SATB and piano (Robert Herrick), 1993

=== Opera ===
- Beauty and the Beast, 3 acts, for piano, orchestra or small chamber orchestra (Michael Ard), 1992
- The Little Match Girl, 1 act, for piano or chamber orchestra (Michael Ard), 1979; orchestration 1990–91
- Sleeping Beauty, 2 acts, for piano or orchestra (Michael Ard), 1970
- The Wydah's Gold, 5 scenes, for piano or chamber orchestra (Robert Weller), 1997

=== Orchestra ===
- Aureole, 1981
- Concert Overture, 1988
- Concerto for Clarinet and Chamber Orchestra
- Concerto No. 1 for Piano and Orchestra, 1969; kermitpeters.net
- Concerto No. 2 for Piano and Orchestra, 1975; chamber arrangement, 1998
- Concerto No. 3 for Piano and Orchestra, 1982
- Concerto for Clarinet and Chamber Orchestra, 1987
- Elegy, 1966
- Festivals, 1980; originally Concerto for Two Pianos, 1972
- Idylls, for oboe and chamber orchestra, 1982
- Lydian Overture, 1984
- Odyssey, 1965
- A Pastoral Overture, 1964
- Phantasie, for piano and orchestra, 1977
- Processional, for string orchestra, 1994
- Sonata No. 1 for piano; orchestrated 1995

=== Piano and organ ===
- Allegheny Serenade, for two pianos, 1998*
- Andante and Allegro for Two Pianos, 1998*
- Arabesques, 2000*
- Carousels, 1991; Belwin Mills
- Carousels, for two pianos, 1972*
- Celebration
- Concerto for Two Pianos, 1973–74; Shawnee Press, Hal Leonard
- Dance Suite, for 4 hands, 1990
- Dances, 1977; Shawnee Press, Hal Leonard
- Differencias, 1969*
- Elegy, for organ (arr. of "Elegy for Orchestra"), 1991*
- Etude "Stratification", 1984
- Family Portraits, 2006
- Fantasy No. 1, 1968*
- Fantasy No. 2, 1987; Shawnee Press
- Finger Paintings, 1966; Shawnee Press, Hal Leonard
- Five Preludes and a Nocturne, 1967; Shawnee Press
- Floating
- Four Cameos, 1971; Shawnee Press
- Four Timbres, 2009
- Gaelic Suite, 1993*
- Gallantries, 2009
- The Highwayman
- Islands, 1970, 1985; Shawnee Press
- Le Mont Saint Michel, 2008*
- Legend, 1967; Summy Birchard
- Little Preludes, 1966*
- Masquerades, 1988; Belwin Mills
- Moments in a Child's World, 1968; Shawnee Press
- Night Piece
- Nocturne, 1975
- Pastoral Suite, 1989, revised 2009; Shawnee Press
- Piano Concerto No. 1, 1969
- Piano Concerto No. 2, 1975
- Piano Concerto No. 3, 1982
- Performance Practices in Late 20th-Century Piano; Alfred Publishing Co.
- Piano Transcriptions of Songs, 2005–10*
- Pipes, 1987; Belwin Mills
- Recollections. Nine Short Pieces, 1969, 1974; Shawnee Press
- Rhapsody, 1980*
- Russian Folk Tales, 1990; Belwin Mills
- Service Sonata, for organ, 1970*
- Six Preludes and a Nocturne
- Skandian Suite, 2008
- Sketches, 1987; Belwin Mills
- Sonata No. 1, 1962, revised 2010
- Sonata No. 2, 1957
- Sonata No. 3, 1958
- Sonatina, 1987
- Sonatina, 1987; Belwin Mills
- Souvenir from 12 by 11, 1979; Alfred Publishing Co.
- Suite "Trouveres", for harpsichord, 2002*
- Tableaux, 4 hands 1987; Belwin Mills
- Three Etudes, 1978, revised 2009
- Three for Two, for two pianos 1998*
- Three Night Songs, 1964, 1980, 2010
- Three Sonatinas
- Toccata "The Dark Riders", 1969; Shawnee Press
- Travels, 1970; Shawnee
- Two Nocturnes, 1976
- Voyages, 2001*
- Woodland Adventures, 1988*

* unpublished

=== Songs ===
(published by Leyerle Publications unless otherwise indicated)

- Noon (Robinson Jeffers), 1944–45; revised 2004*
- Sea Fever (John Masefield), 1945
- Music I Heard With You (Conrad Aiken), 1946–47
- Granite (Lew Sarett), 1948*
- She Weeps Over Rahoon (James Joyce), 1950*
- Dark Hills (Edward Arlington Robinson), 1950
- Spring, the Sweet Spring (Thomas Nashe), 1950–51
- Tumultuous Moment (Lew Sarett), 1951*
- Desire in Spring (Francis Ledwidge), 1952
- Evening (Rupert Brooke), 1952*
- To Helen (Edgar Allan Poe), 1953
- Remember Me (Christina Rossetti), 1954
- The Blackbird (William Ernest Henley), 1955
- Music When Soft Voices Die (Percy Bysshe Shelley), 1957
- Dry Spell (Lizzi Morrison), 1957*
- River Roses (D.H. Lawrence), 1958*
- Dover Beach (Matthew Arnold), 1958
- In the Evening of Inhabiting Mists (Linda Joy), 1959*
- Spring (Jack Wertz), 1960*
- The Owl and the Pussy-Cat (Edward Lear), 1960
- Bobby Shafto (Mother Goose), 1961
- Laura Sleeping (Charles Cotton), 1962
- Hymn of Praise (The Jewish Union Prayerbook), 1962
- The Sun has Set (Emily Brontë), 1964–65
- The Solitary Reaper with flute and piano (William Wordsworth), 1966
- Harvest Song with flute and piano (Joseph Campbell (poet)), 1967*
- Caterpillar (Lillian Vaneda), 1967; revised in 1992 as Firefly (June Presswood)
- Night Piece (Joseph Campbell (poet)), 1970*
- The River (Patrick MacDonogh), 1971, revised 2009*
- On the Isle of Skye (Richard Faith), 1973
- I have Embarked, for voice, cello (and violin) and piano;(Jean de la Ville Mirmont fr:Jean de La Ville de Mirmont; trans. by Martha Belen), 1975
- Chant with cello and piano (vocalise), 1976
- It is a Beauteous Evening (William Wordsworth), 1976
- The Lake Isle of Innisfree (William Butler Yeats), 1980
- The Wild Swans at Coole (William Butler Yeats), 1981
- The Wind Blows Out of the Gates of the Day (William Butler Yeats), 1981
- To Celia (Drink to me only with thine eyes, Ben Jonson after Philostratus), 1982
- He Remembers Forgotten Beauty (William Butler Yeats), 1982; Classical Vocal Reprints
- O, the Month of May (Thomas Dekker (writer)), 1982
- Sonnet 54 (O, how much more does beauty beauteous seem, William Shakespeare), 1982
- In the Land of Sleeping Seeds for two high voices (Mary Stigers), 1982*
- It was a Lover and his Lass (William Shakespeare), 1982
- The Song of Wandering Aengus (William Butler Yeats), 1982
- I Hear the Shadowy Horses (William Butler Yeats), 1982
- If I Were (poet unknown), 1982
- Ships for voice, cello (and violin) and piano (Jean de la Ville Mirmont fr:Jean de La Ville de Mirmont; trans. by Martha Belen), 1983
- Stanzas Written in Dejection near Naples (Percy Bysshe Shelley), 1984*
- Flight (James Wood), 1984*
- Why Must I Go (James Wood), 1984*
- Perhaps (James Wood), 1984*
- Though I Speak (Corinthians I, 13, St. Paul), 1985*
- Annabel Lee (Edgar Allan Poe), 1985
- The Passionate Shepherd to his Love (Christopher Marlowe), 1985
- Serenade (anon. medieval Latin; trans. by Helen Waddell), 1985
- Sonnet 116 (Let me not to the marriage of true minds, William Shakespeare), 1986*
- The City in the Sea (Edgar Allan Poe), 1989
- To Jane or The Keen Stars were Twinkling (Percy Bysshe Shelley), 1989
- Echo (Christina Rossetti), 1991
- Spring Quiet (Christina Rossetti), 1991
- No Music in the Wind (Lou Anna Thomas), 1991*
- My Heart is like a Singing Bird (Christina Rossetti), 1992
- Scenes from Macbeth for Soprano, Baritone and Piano (William Shakespeare), 1992*
- Apollo and Daphne for Mezzo, Baritone and Piano (Richard Faith), 1992*
- Return of Spring (Ssü-K'ung T'u trans. by Launcelot Cranmer-Byng), 1992
- Absence (Abū Bakr al-Turushi; trans. by Cola Franzen), 1993*
- Serene Evening (Muhammad ibn Ghālib al-Rusāfi; trans. by Cola Franzen), 1993*
- Split my Heart (Ibn Hazm; trans. by Cola Franzen), 1993*
- Leavetaking (Ibn Jakh; trans. by Cola Franzen), 1993*
- Oh, Fateful Night (Ibn Safr al-Marīnī; trans. by Cola Franzen), 1993*
- Winter Journey (William Lavonis), 1993
- All Day I Hear the Noise of Waters (James Joyce), 1993*
- To Chloris (Sir Charles Sedley, 5th Baronet), 1993*
- Where are you going to, my pretty maid? (Mother Goose), 1994
- Jenny Wren (Mother Goose), 1994
- I saw three ships (Mother Goose), 1994
- The Queen of Hearts (Mother Goose), 1994
- God Be in My Head (Sarum Primer), 1994
- What Sweeter Music (Robert Herrick), 1994
- So all day long the noise of battle rolled (Alfred, Lord Tennyson), 1994*
- Crossing the Bar (Alfred, Lord Tennyson), 1994
- Wisdom is Sweeter than Honey (Makeda, Queen of Sheba), 1994; publ.as INCANTATIONS, Musik Fabrik, France
- Come, my Beloved (Song of Songs: The Shulammite), 1994; publ.as INCANTATIONS, Musik Fabrik, France
- I Bind you by Oath (A Roman Spell), 1994; publ.as INCANTATIONS, Musik Fabrik, France
- I Cannot Dance, O Lord (Mechtild of Magdeburg), 1994; publ.as INCANTATIONS, Musik Fabrik, France
- So, we'll go no more a roving, duet for tenor and baritone (Lord Byron), 1995; Classical Vocal Reprints
- The Isles of Greece (Lord Byron), 1995
- A Sailor's Song (Audrey Weinreis), 1995
- The Isle of Pines (Po chü-i trans. by L. Cranmer Byng), 1995
- Time does not bring relief (Edna St. Vincent Millay), 1995*
- To a Waterfowl (William Cullen Bryant), 1996
- The Death of a Conqueror (Jared Freedeen), 1996*
- Though the Way be Dark (Carl A. Dallinger), 1996
- Autumn Memories (Carl A. Dallinger), 1996
- A Moment in Time (Carl A. Dallinger), 1997
- Old Mother Goose (Mother Goose), 1997
- My Mother Said (Mother Goose), 1997
- Sing a Song of Sixpence (Mother Goose), 1997
- Old Woman, Old Woman (Mother Goose), 1997
- Love is not all (Edna St. Vincent Millay), 1998*
- And you as well must die, beloved dust (Edna St. Vincent Millay), 1998*
- Low Moon Land (Francis Ledwidge), 1998*
- Apollo and Daphne for Mezzo, Baritone and Piano (Richard Faith), 2000*
- Water (Michael Ard), 2000; revised 2010; Classical Vocal Reprints
- The Stolen Child (William Butler Yeats), 2001; Classical Vocal Reprints
- Prelude (John Millington Synge), 2001*
- Vocalise, 2001*
- Fire (Michael Ard), 2001; revised 2010; Classical Vocal Reprints
- Air (Michael Ard), 2002; revised 2010; Classical Vocal Reprints
- Earth (Michael Ard), 2002; revised 2010; Classical Vocal Reprints
- The Dead Poet, duet for tenor and baritone (Lord Alfred Douglas), 2002*
- O Spirit of the Summertime for High Voice, Cello and Piano (William Allingham), 2003*
- At the Mid Hour of Night (Thomas Moore), 2005*
- Sudden Light (Dante Gabriel Rossetti), 2005*
- The Fiddler of Dooney (William Butler Yeats), 2007; Classical Vocal Reprints
- Verses from Lamentations (Jeremiah), 2007*
- Sonnet 104 (William Shakespeare), 2007*
- Drifting (Li Po (Li Bai) trans. by L. Cranmer Byng), 2009*
- The Rose of Tralee (William Pembroke Mulchinock), 2009*
- Echoes: Two Songs in One (John Todhunter, Thomas Moore), 2010*
- Poems from the Voices of Gaia (Michael Ard), 2010; Classical Vocal Reprints
- The Ancient Wind (Po chü-i trans. by L. Cranmer Byng), 2010*
- Sonnet 116, new setting (William Shakespeare), 2011; Classical Vocal Reprints
- There Will Be Rest (Sara Teasdale); for Karen Krueger, 2011; Classical Vocal Reprints
- On first looking into Chapman's Homer (John Keats), 2012 Classical Vocal Reprints
- Much have I travell'd in realms of gold (John Keats), 2014*
- From House of Dust, duet for tenor and baritone (Conrad Potter Aiken), 2014*

* unpublished

== Discography ==
- Incantations & Rhymes: Music for Soprano, Viola, and Piano. Karen Peeler, soprano; Henrietta Neeley, viola; Robin Guy, piano. Superdups, Tewksbury, MA.
- Music I heard With You — David Jimerson Sings Songs of Richard Faith
- Remember Me: Songs by Richard Faith. Lesley Manring, soprano; Julie Simson, mezzo-soprano; William Lavonis, tenor; Kurt Ollmann, baritone; Elizabeth Rodgers, piano; Richard Faith, piano. eDream Studios, Milwaukee, WI.
- Remember Me: Songs by Richard Faith. Brenda Baker, soprano; Richard Faith, piano.
- Rhapsody-Chamber Music of Richard Faith
- Songs of Love and Longing, Valerie Errante, soprano
- The Songs of Richard Faith. Joseph Hopkins, baritone; Richard Faith, piano. Hopkins Recording Company
- Incantations and Rhymes. Trio Ariana
- The Ensemble da Camera of Washington. Fantasy Trio for Violin, Clarinet and Piano
- New Works for Bassoon. Suite for Bassoon and Piano
- The Catalina Chamber Orchestra. Concerto for Clarinet and Chamber Orchestra
