= Protestant Cemetery, Bordeaux =

Historic cemetery in Bordeaux, France

Cimetière protestant de Bordeaux
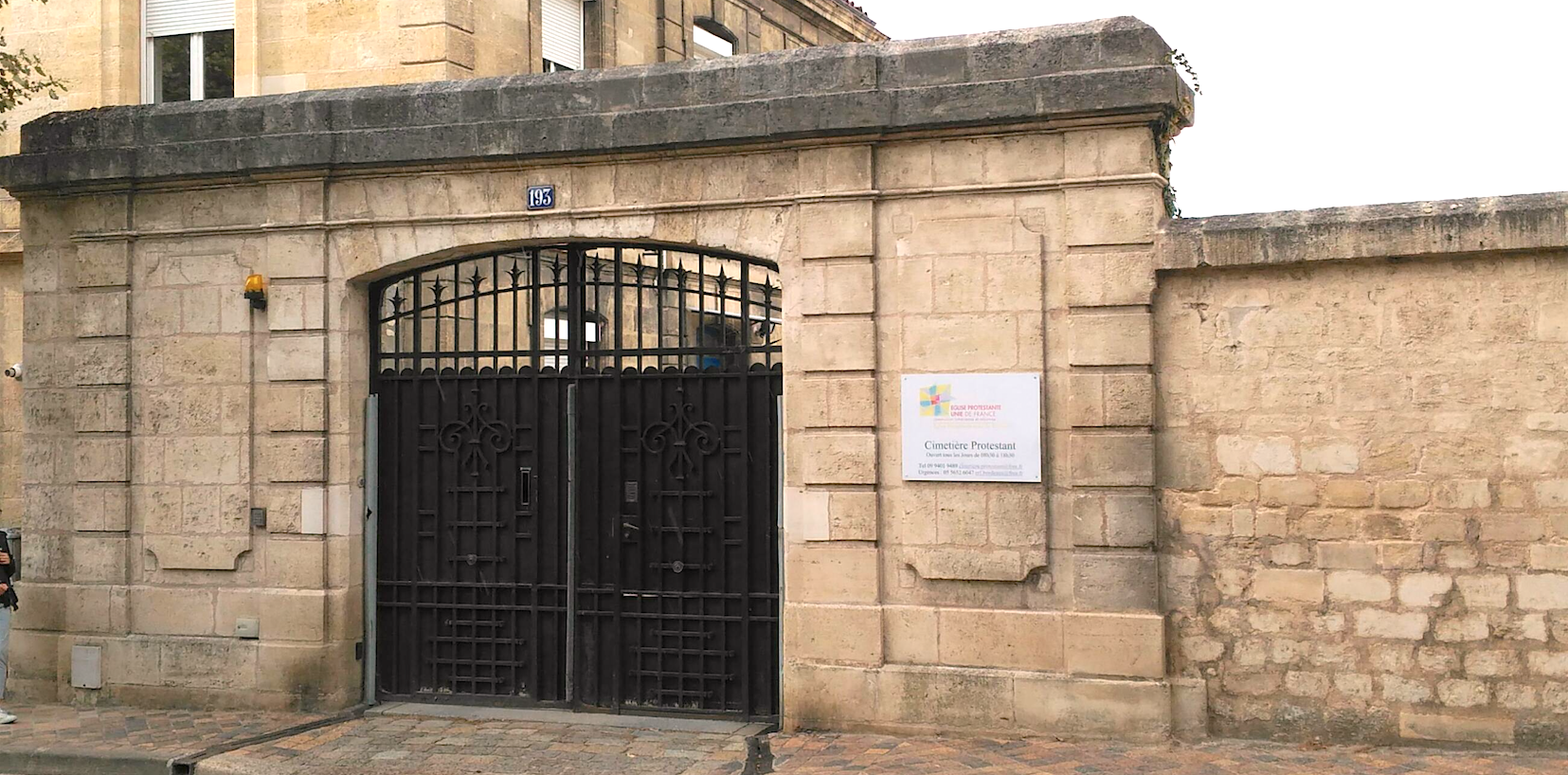
- The cemetery entrance

Details
- Established: 1827
- Location: Bordeaux
- Country: France
- Coordinates: 44°50′28″N 0°35′39″W
- Type: Protestant cemetery
- Owned by: United Protestant Church of France
- Size: 1,5 ha
- No. of graves: 1,300
- Website: Official website

The Protestant cemetery of Bordeaux (French: Le cimetière protestant de Bordeaux) is a historic, church-owned and operated Protestant cemetery located in the city of Bordeaux, in France. The cemetery was inaugurated in 1826 in the district of Caudéran. And the first burial was recorded in March 1827. Enlarged in 1867, a small funerary chapel was built in 1910 on the cemetery ground.

== History and description ==
Before the Edict of Nantes granted Protestants some religious tolerance and rights to worship freely, Protestants had to bury their dead clandestinely on private property, farm land or cellars. The current cemetery on rue Judaïque covers an area of 1.5 hectares, containing approximately 1,300 plots. A monumental gate was designed by the architect Armand Corcelles who also built the Chartrons Reformed Church on rue Notre-Dame in Bordeaux. The burial ground reflects the diverse and multicultural character of Bordeaux with tombs belonging to the deceased Reformed Calvinists, Lutherans, Anglicans of various nationalities. Although most of the grave sites are plain and austere, owing to the Calvinist doctrine and teachings, there are some ornate monuments, family mausoleums and burial chapels in neo-Gothic and Victorian architectural styles which belong to prominent German-Lutheran and British-Anglican families such as Barton, Johnston, Stuttenberg families.

== Notable burials ==
List is sorted in order of the year of death.

- Pierre-Barthélémy Portal d'Albarèdes Baron Portal (1765–1845), French politician
- Ludovic Trarieux (1840–1904), French Republican statesman, lawyer, prominent Dreyfusard, and pioneer of international human rights
- Jean de La Ville de Mirmont (1886–1914), French war poet
- Chocolat (clown) Rafael Padilla (1868–1917), Afro-Cuban clown, one of the earliest successful black entertainers in modern France
- Hortense Schneider (1833–1920), French soprano, one of the greatest operetta stars of the 19th century
- Camille Jullian (1859–1933), French historian, philologist, archaeologist and historian of literature
- Manon Cormier (1896–1945), French lawyer and feminist writer
- Willem van Hasselt (1882–1963), Dutch painter
- Henri Salmide (1919–2010), named Heinz Stahlschmidt at birth, German naval officer

== Gallery ==
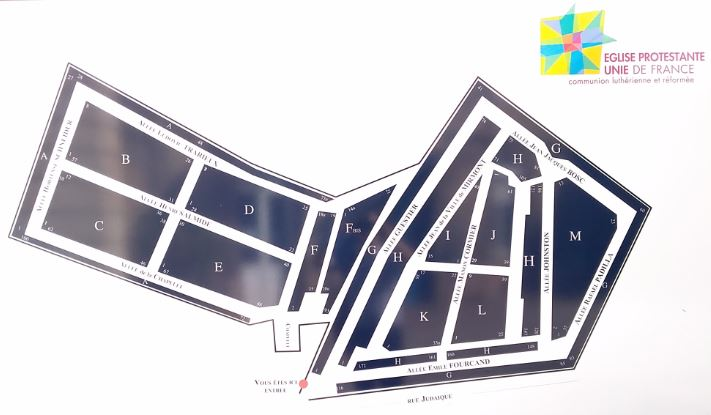

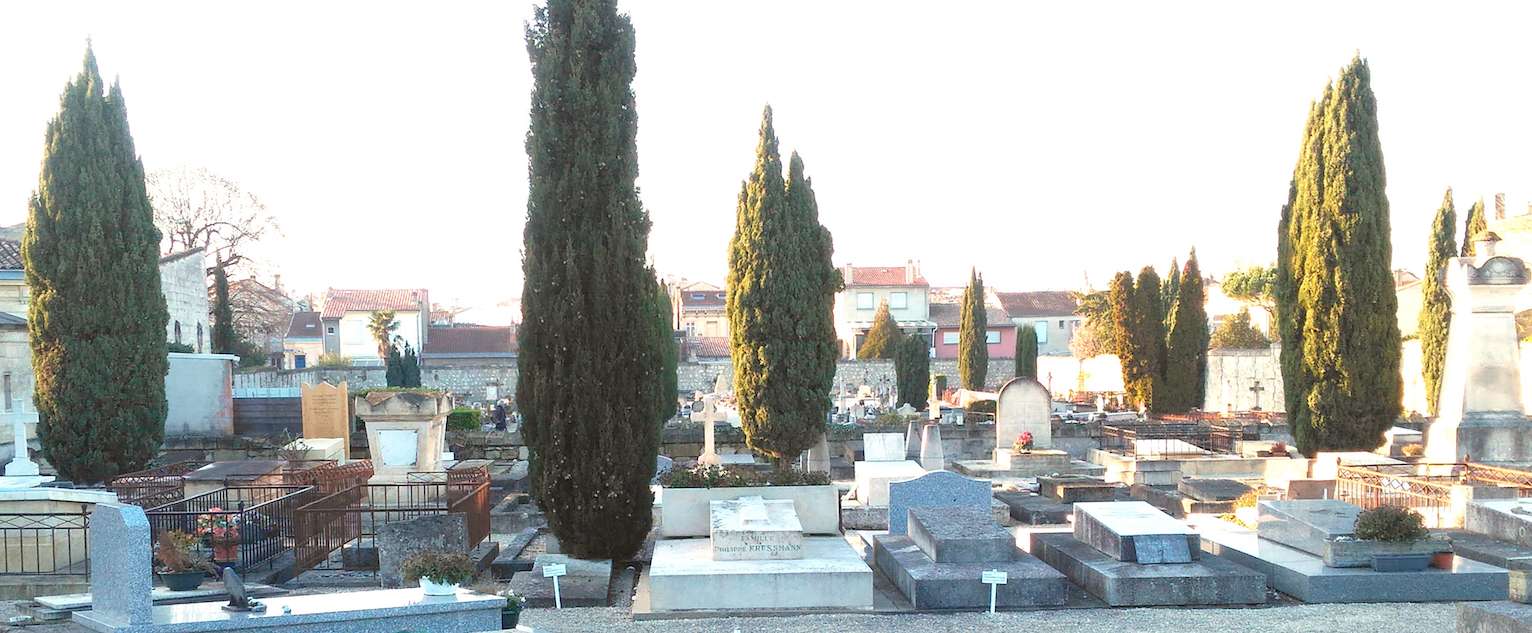

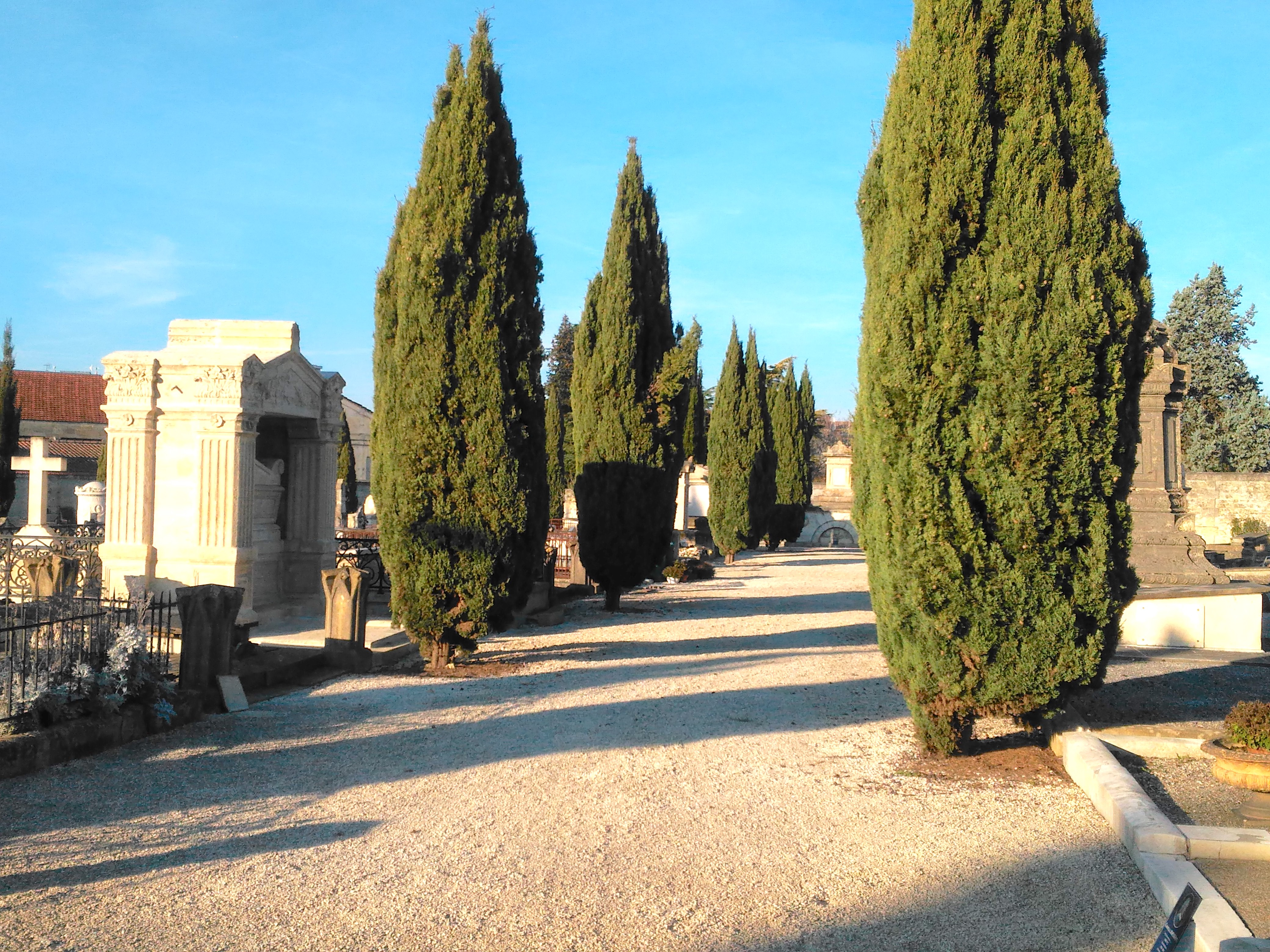

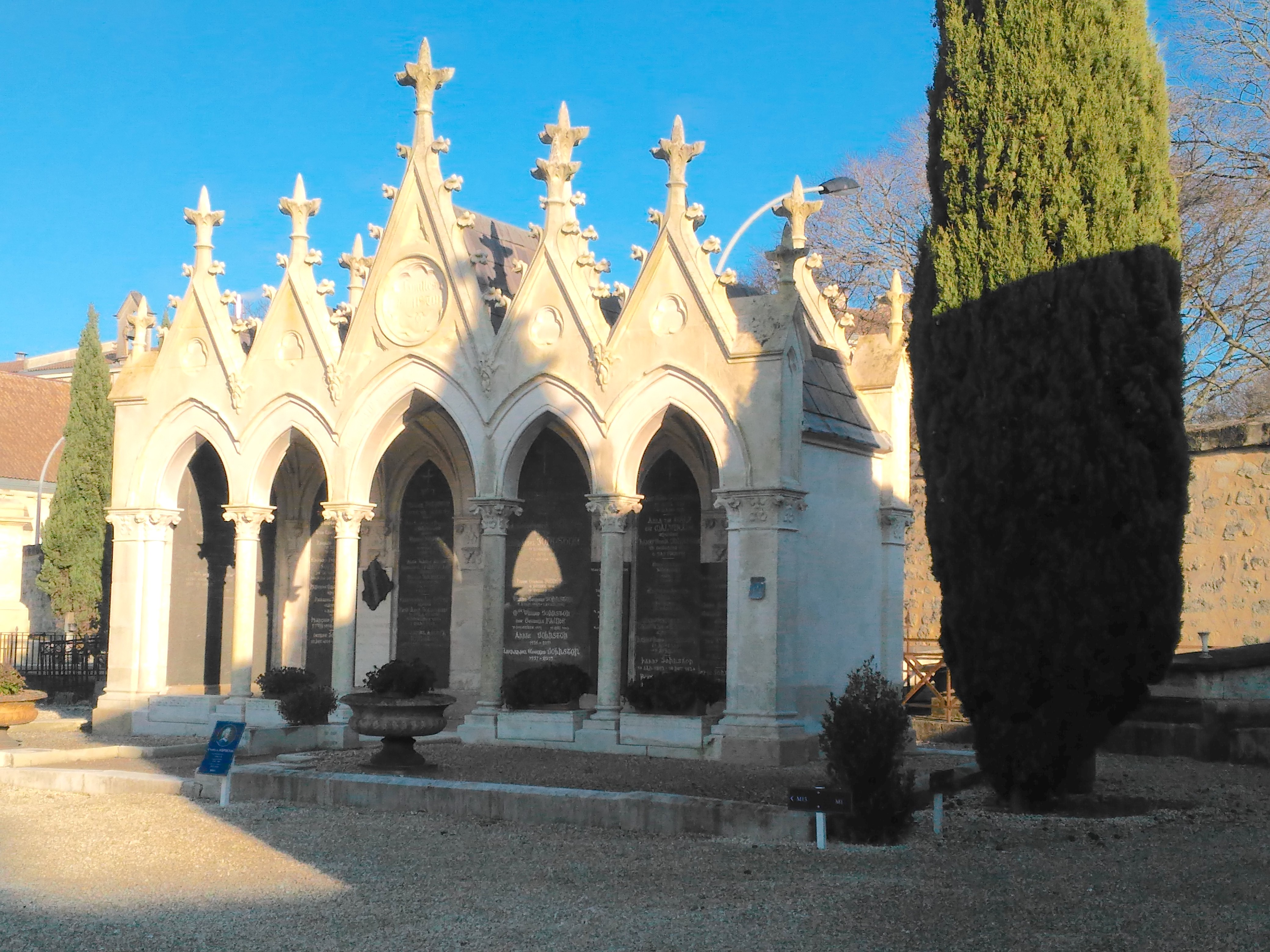

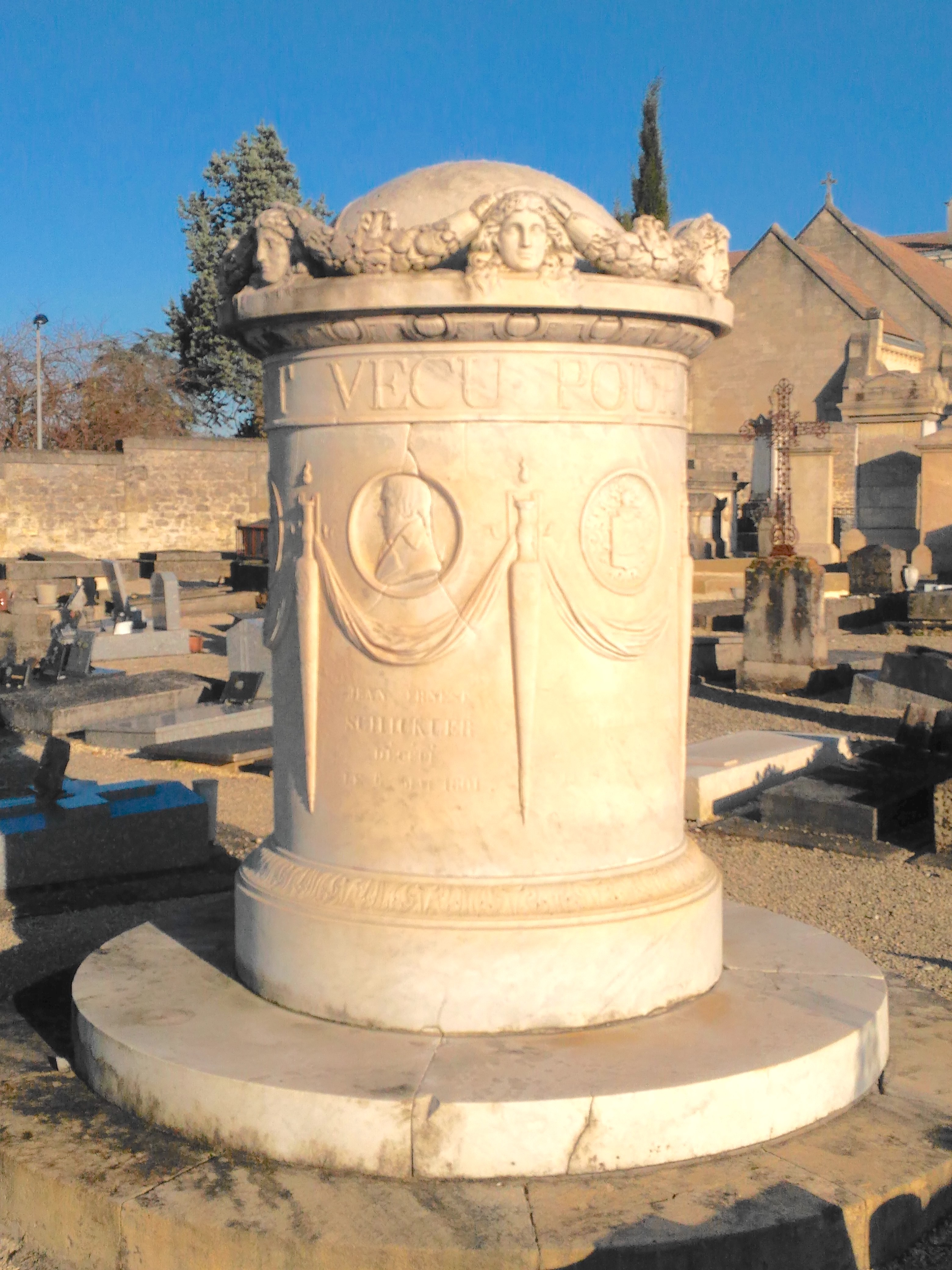

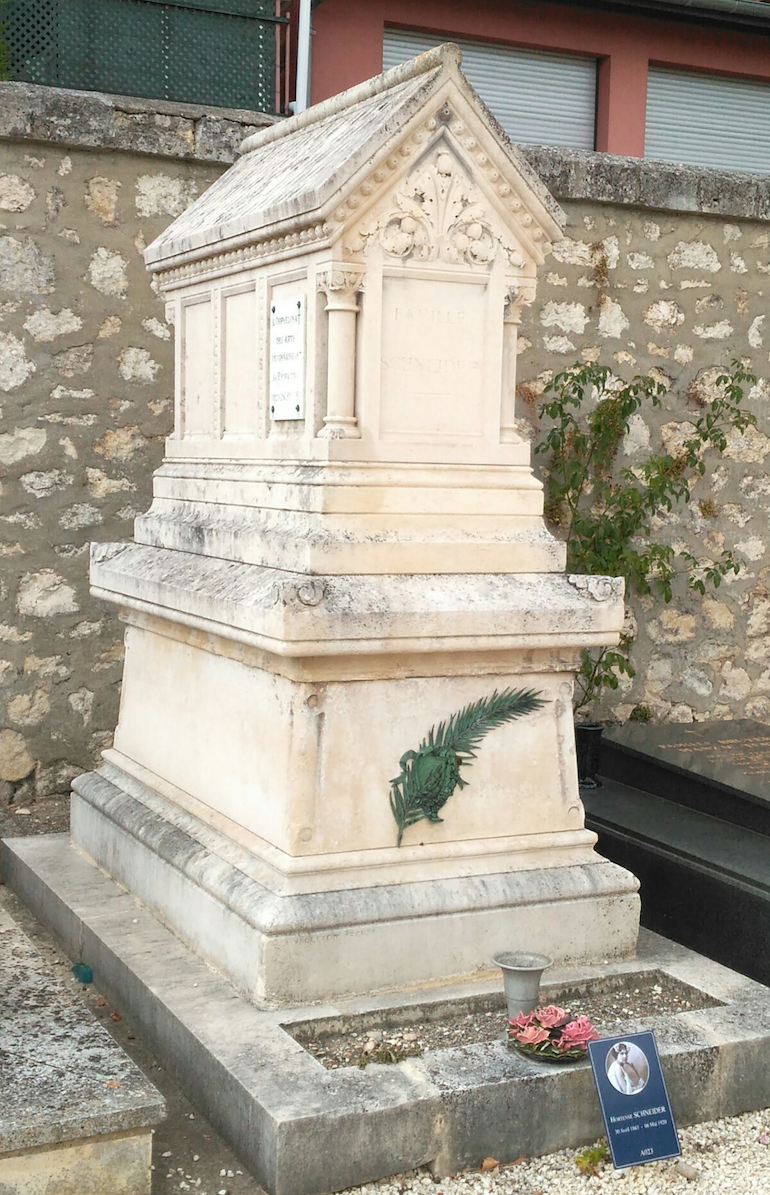

== See also ==
- Protestantism in France
