= Sonnet 118 =

« » Sonnet 118
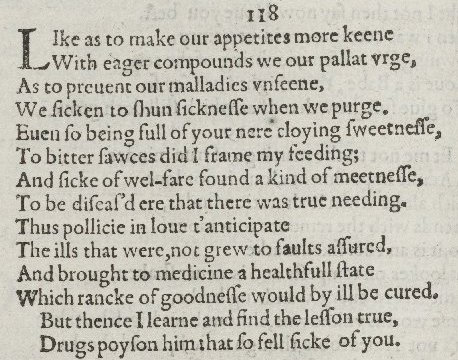
- Sonnet 118 in the 1609 Quarto
Q1
Q2
Q3
C
Like as, to make our appetites more keen,
With eager compounds we our palate urge;
As, to prevent our maladies unseen,
We sicken to shun sickness when we purge;
Even so, being full of your ne’er-cloying sweetness,
To bitter sauces did I frame my feeding;
And sick of welfare found a kind of meetness
To be diseas’d, ere that there was true needing.
Thus policy in love, to anticipate
The ills that were not, grew to faults assured,
And brought to medicine a healthful state,
Which, rank of goodness, would by ill be cured:
But thence I learn, and find the lesson true,
Drugs poison him that so fell sick of you.
—William Shakespeare
4
8
12
14

Sonnet 118 is one of 154 sonnets written by the English playwright and poet William Shakespeare. It is a member of the Fair Youth sequence, in which the poet expresses his love towards a young man.

== Structure ==
Sonnet 118 is a typical English or Shakespearean sonnet. It consists of three quatrains followed by a couplet, with the characteristic rhyme scheme ABAB CDCD EFEF GG. It is composed in iambic pentameter, a type of poetic metre based on five pairs of metrically weak/strong syllabic positions. The 13th line exemplifies a regular iambic pentameter:

 ×    /    ×  /     ×    /     ×  /  ×    / 
But thence I learn, and find the lesson true, (118.13)

Lines 5, 6, 7, and 8 each have a final extrametrical syllable or feminine ending:

 ×  /  ×   /  ×   /  ×   /    ×  / (×) 
To bitter sauces did I frame my feeding; (118.6)

/ = ictus, a metrically strong syllabic position. × = nonictus. (×) = extrametrical syllable.

Line 4 features the rightward movement of the second ictus (resulting in a four-position figure, × × / /, sometimes referred to as a minor ionic):

 ×  /  ×   ×   /   /   ×     /   ×  / 
We sicken to shun sickness when we purge; (118.4)

The meter demands a few variant pronunciations: line 5's "even" and "being" each function as one syllable. Line 9 requires an unusual (to modern ears) contraction, "t'anticipate".

Sonnet 118's first two quatrains feature typical Shakespearean parallel construction with each pair of lines introduced with "Like as to", "As to", "Even so", and "And". Reminiscent of the Petrarchan sonnet, there is a volta, or shift, in the poem's subject matter beginning with the third quatrain.

== Analysis ==
Traditionally the administering of emetics, the trope worked in Sonnet 118, had three purposes: to renew the palate, to forestall the onset of sickness, and to counteract poison. The sonnet also picks up the motif of "palate", "cup", and "poison", left off at the end of Sonnet 114. The first pair of lines describes how "we our pallat urge"; "urge" means to 'intensify' or 'sharpen' the taste, but the word was used also of distillations which are 'urged' to a degree that a compound is yielded. "Appetites" are sharpened or made more acute ("more keen") with "eager compounds". A 'compound' is a medicinal concoction, in this case one that is sharp or "biting" like 'vin-egar', a wine that is made 'eager' or sharp. The second pair of lines explores emetics that are taken ("we purge") to "prevent" illnesses yet to come ("maladies unseen"). Emetics make us sick through vomit ("sicken"), so that we might avoid ailments ("shun sickness").

The second quatrain applies the principles of the first: "being full of your ne'er-cloying sweetness, / To bitter sauces did I frame my feeding;" "ne'er" firstly means never, as in the poet is never sated by the youth's sweetness. But "nere" meaning 'near' or 'almost' can't be ignored: the poet's palate is "full" of the friend's sweetness, that is nearly rich enough to cause gagging ("cloying"). To refresh his palate the poet has designed his diet to include "bitter sauces". Bitter digestifs typically contain carminative herbs, which are thought to aid digestion. As a consequence, the poet has found himself inoculated against future ailments. He has been made "sick of welfare" but finds it appropriate ("a kind of meetness", with echoes of 'meat') that he has become ill ("To be diseased"), before there was any cause to be so ("ere that there was true needing").

The sestet applies the emetical trope to love: a "policy" is a course of prudent action. Love, to be prudent and to forestall future ailings ("to anticipate / The ills that were, not"), acquainted itself early with transgressions ("grew to faults assured") that operate like a curative vomit. In so doing, love submitted to medicine ("brought to medicine") "a healthful state", a state reeking of goodness ("rank of goodness"). The "healthful state", with its goodness, "would by ill be cured", would as if by an initial, induced sickness be cured. The moral the poet has learnt and has proved by bitter experience is that potions ("Drugs", in this case transgressions), rather than acting as an antidote to the disease of love, only act to poison love.
