= Jean de La Ville de Mirmont =

French poet

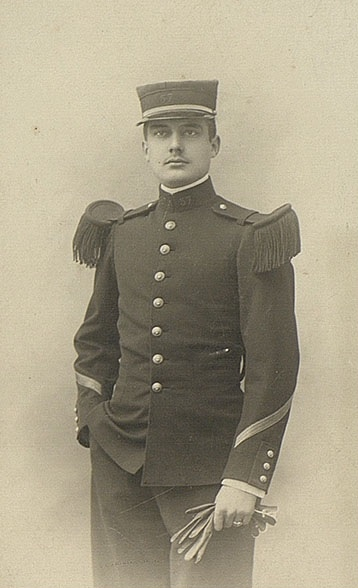
Jean de la Ville de Mirmont Portrait

Jean de La Ville de Mirmont (2 December 1886 – 28 November 1914) was a French war poet, who died at the age of 27 defending his country during World War I, at Verneuil.

== Biography ==
Jean de La Ville de Mirmont was born in Bourdeaux into the Huguenot family of Henri and Sophie Malan. He was one of six siblings. His father Henri was a professor of literature known for his translation of Cicero as well as an alderman for Bordeaux.

At the age of 22, Jean moved to Paris, where he renewed his childhood friendship with François Mauriac (the latter was to recall the former frequently, most notably in La Rencontre avec Barrès, 1945). Jean held a government post at the prefectory of the Seine where he was responsible for assisting the elderly.

According to Ian Higgins, "Although unfit for active service, Jean de La Ville de Mirmont volunteered immediately when the war broke out, but it was only after being repeatedly turned down that he finally managed to enlist."

In 1914, he was called to the front with the rank of sergeant of the 57th Infantry Regiment.

According to Ian Higgins, "It has been suggested that here at last was the great adventure he had been longing for. Certainly, the prelude to the war 'interested' him, and he was keen to witness and, if possible, take part in a war which was probably going to 'set the whole of Europe on fire.' His Lettres de guerre develop movingly from initial enthusiasm for the defense of Civilization and a conviction that the enemy was the entire German people, through a growing irritation with chauvinistic brainwashing and the flagrancy of what would now be called the 'disinformation' peddled through the French press (so much more heavily censored than the British, he said), to an eventual admiration, at the front, for the heroism and humanity often shown by the enemy."

La Ville de Mirmont was mentioned in dispatches on November 4, 1914.

On November 28, however, he was buried alive by a landmine explosion at Verneuil, near Chemin des Dames. La Ville de Mirmont was still alive when his comrades dug him out, but the explosion had broken his spine and he died soon afterwards. One account alleges that he died after saying, Maman. Other accounts, allege, however, that there were no last words."

Jean de La Ville de Mirmont's body was re-exhumed by his family in 1920. It rests in the family tomb H.42 at the Protestant Cemetery at rue Judaïque in Bordeaux.

== Works ==
His main works are:

- Les Dimanches de Jean Dézert (1914), a novel inspired by his career as a civil servant, and building on the 8 short stories of his Contes (1923)
- L'Horizon chimérique (1920), a posthumous poetry collection with woodcuts by Léon Dusouchet (1876-1936). Four of the poems, including the famous "Vaisseaux, nous vous aurons aimés", were set to music by Gabriel Fauré in a song cycle of the same name. More recently its poems were set by Julien Clerc in the album Si j'étais elle.

Also:

- Lettres de guerre (1917), war-time letters to his parents and others, published posthumously.

=== Development ===
His work developed from a romantic concern with the ocean and sea-voyages - influenced by Baudelaire and Jules Laforgue, and described by himself as "steeped in vague rhetoric/in romanticism" - to sharper, hard-edged views of contemporary Parisian life, as seen in his later contes and in his novel: to a concern above all (in his own words) with the "humdrum routine of human existence".

=== Republications ===
Les Dimanches was republished in 1994 by Quai Voltaire, with a preface by Dominique Joubert; and in 2008, Grasset Editions reissued both it and L'Horizon chimérique, followed by Contes, in the collection Les Cahiers rouges.

== Influence ==
The novel Strangulation (2008) by Mathieu Larnaudie portrays a character mainly based on the life of Jean de La Ville de Mirmont.

== See also ==
Anti-hero

Conte philosophique

C. P. Cavafy

Dada

Robert Musil
