= Henri Salmide =

German naval officer

- Heinz Stahlschmidt in his German Navy uniform
- Born: 13 November 1919; Dortmund, Germany
- Died: 23 February 2010 (aged 90); Bordeaux, France
- Other name: Heinz Stahlschmidt
- Known for: Saving port of Bordeaux

Henri Salmide (born Heinz Stahlschmidt, 13 November 1919 – 23 February 2010) was a German naval officer who, in August 1944, refused to blow up the port of Bordeaux, France when so ordered by his superiors during World War II. Instead, he blew up the bunker containing the ordnance that had been stock-piled for the purpose of destroying the port.

== Early life ==
Salmide was born in Dortmund, Germany. He joined Nazi Germany's Kriegsmarine in 1939 and was trained in demolitions, becoming an expert in defusing British naval mines. While serving in the Navy, he survived the sinkings of three warships on which he was serving.

== Bordeaux, 1944 ==
Salmide was stationed in Bordeaux, the largest port in France, when Allied forces closed in during August 1944. On 19 August 1944 he was ordered to destroy the city's entire port infrastructure, stretching across seven miles, with explosives—a plan intended to prevent the use of the port to reinforce Allied forces spreading through the country in the weeks following the D-Day invasion. In 1977, Salmide spoke about the incident in an interview with Reuters. He recalled, "My family were Huguenots, and I acted according to my Christian conscience, I could not accept that the port would be wantonly destroyed when the war was clearly lost." On 22 August 1944, four days before the planned destruction of the port, he blew up the munitions depot where the Germans had stored 4,000 fuses to be used in destroying the port. Salmide "laid strips of dynamite inside the supply bunker filled with demolition hardware and thousands of pounds of ordnance and watched as the city shook from the huge explosion." Salmide's actions killed approximately 50 Germans, but were credited with saving an estimated 3,500 civilians.

Salmide's actions were credited not only with saving thousands of civilian lives, but also with saving France's most important harbor and preserving a stable platform for the region's post-war economic recovery.

After the detonation, Salmide presented himself to the French resistance and reported what he had done. The resistance hid him from the German forces who had branded him a traitor and ordered that he be arrested or shot on sight. Salmide spent the last months of the war in hiding with a French woman whose grandson, Alain Moga, would later serve as Bordeaux's deputy mayor. He hid from both the Gestapo and French police and later recalled that French officials nearly shot him after the war because of his German military service.

== Post-war life ==
In post-war Germany, Salmide was regarded as a traitor, and his name was stricken from the list of German Navy personnel eligible to receive a pension. As his actions became known, he earned the gratitude of the French people who referred to him as "the little Frenchman" and the "Bordeaux Choltitz"—a reference to Dietrich von Choltitz, who disobeyed Adolf Hitler's order to raze Paris if it was threatened by Allied forces.

He adopted the French name, Henri Salmide, became a naturalized French citizen in 1947, married a French woman, Henriette Buison, and lived in Bordeaux for the rest of his life. He worked as a firefighter in Bordeaux's port fire brigade for more than 30 years.

In 2000, Salmide became a Knight of the French Légion d'Honneur. Salmide died in Bordeaux in February 2010, and Bordeaux city officials said at the time that the city intended to build a memorial in his honor. His body is interred at the Protestant cemetery in Bordeaux.

The headquarters of Bordeaux Port Atlantique, located in Bacalan, was named after Salmide in 2012.

== Biography ==
"L'Allemand qui a refusé de détruire Bordeaux" (french) 2019, Erwan Langeo - ISBN 9782955715529
