= Sonnet 115 =

« » Sonnet 115
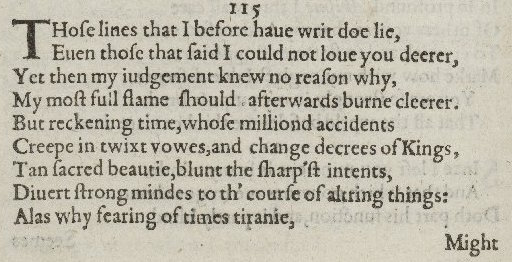
- The first nine lines of Sonnet 115 in the 1609 Quarto
Q1
Q2
Q3
C
Those lines that I before have writ do lie,
Even those that said I could not love you dearer:
Yet then my judgment knew no reason why
My most full flame should afterwards burn clearer.
But reckoning Time, whose million’d accidents
Creep in ’twixt vows, and change decrees of kings,
Tan sacred beauty, blunt the sharp’st intents,
Divert strong minds to the course of altering things;
Alas, why, fearing of Time’s tyranny,
Might I not then say “Now I love you best,”
When I was certain o’er incertainty,
Crowning the present, doubting of the rest?
Love is a babe; then might I not say so,
To give full growth to that which still doth grow?
—William Shakespeare
4
8
12
14

Sonnet 115 is one of 154 sonnets written by the English playwright and poet William Shakespeare. It is a member of the Fair Youth sequence, in which the poet expresses his love towards a young man.

== Synopsis ==
The poet's earlier verses were a lie because it said he could not love the youth more. At the time he didn't understand that his love could be more intense in future, assuming that time would blunt it. Fearing this, he said that he loved the youth most powerfully then. Love is a baby, so might he not ascribe full size to one that's still growing?

== Structure ==
Sonnet 115 is an English or Shakespearean sonnet. The English sonnet has three quatrains, followed by a final rhyming couplet. It follows the typical rhyme scheme of the form ABAB CDCD EFEF GG and is composed in iambic pentameter, a type of poetic metre based on five pairs of metrically weak/strong syllabic positions. The 1st line exemplifies a regular iambic pentameter:

  ×    /      ×  /  × /    ×     /   ×  / 
Those lines that I before have writ do lie, (115.1)

This sonnet contains examples of all three metrical variations typically found in literary iambic pentameter of the period. Lines 2 and 4 feature a final extrametrical syllable or feminine ending:

 ×  /    ×     /     ×    /  ×  /     ×     / (×) 
My most full flame should afterwards burn clearer. (115.4)

/ = ictus, a metrically strong syllabic position. × = nonictus. (×) = extrametrical syllable.

The 12th line exhibits an initial reversal, which can also be found in line 13 (and potentially in lines 6, 7, and 10):

  /  ×     ×   / ×     /   ×   /    ×  / 
Crowning the present, doubting of the rest? (115.12)

Finally, the 9th line exhibits the rightward movement of the third ictus (resulting in a four-position figure, × × / /, sometimes referred to as a minor ionic):

× /     ×   /  ×   ×   /      / ×  / 
Alas! why, fearing of Time's tyranny, (115.9)

The meter demands a few variant pronunciations: line 2's "even" functions as one syllable, line 5's "reckoning" and line 8's "altering" as two, and line 8's "to the" is contracted to "to th'".
