= Manon Cormier =

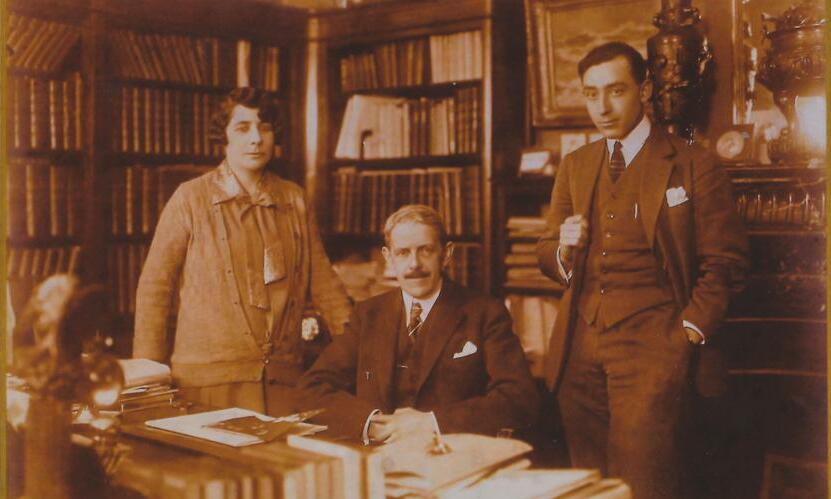
Manon Cormier with Sam Maxwell

Madeleine Cormier, known as Manon Cormier (born 27 August 1896, Bordeaux, France; died 25 May 1945, Paris, France), was a lawyer and feminist writer. Active and activist, Manon Cormier undertakes a doctorate of Law at the Faculty of Bordeaux, and in parallel engages in many associations. She was the president of the Bordeaux Students' Association, a member of charities, such as the French Red Cross, involved in the Women's Liberation Movement as founder and president of the Gironde section of the French League for Women's Rights, founder of the Soroptimist Club of Bordeaux. A resistance fighter during World War II, Cormier was arrested and imprisoned in Mauthausen concentration camp. She survived until liberation but was heavily weakened and died in Paris after the war's conclusion.
