= Moussy-Verneuil =

- Commune
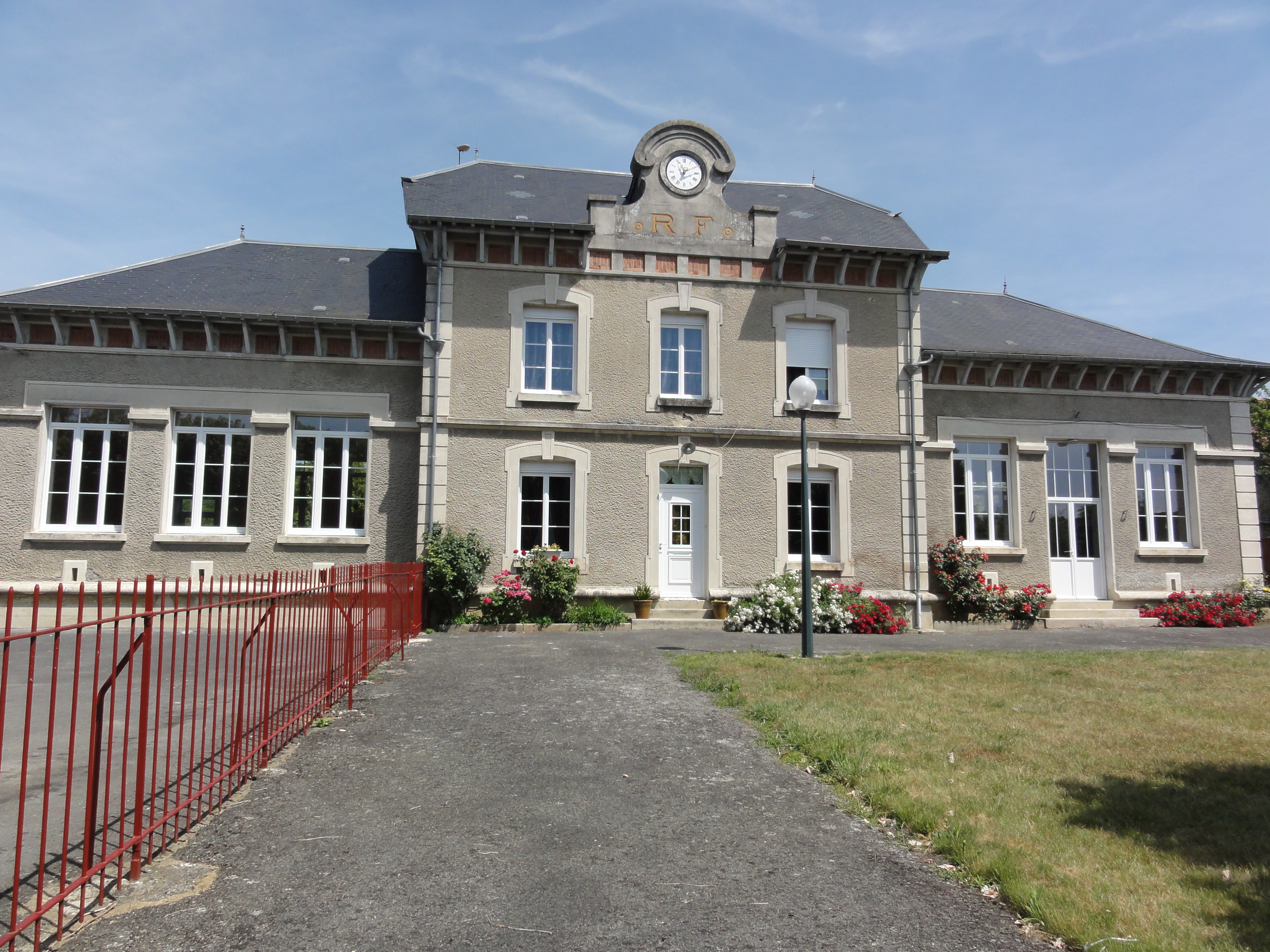
- The town hall of Moussy-Verneuil
- Location of Moussy-Verneuil
- Location within France Location within Hauts-de-France
- Coordinates: 49°25′00″N 3°38′06″E
- Country: France
- Region: Hauts-de-France
- Department: Aisne
- Arrondissement: Laon
- Canton: Villeneuve-sur-Aisne
- Intercommunality: Chemin des Dames

Government
  - Mayor (2026–32): Fabrice Briquet
- Area^{1}: 6.43 km^{2} (2.48 sq mi)
- Highest elevation: 160 m (520 ft)
- Lowest elevation: 44 m (144 ft)
- Population (2023): 141
  - Density: 21.9/km^{2} (56.8/sq mi)
- Time zone: UTC+01:00 (CET)
  - Summer (DST): UTC+02:00 (CEST)
- INSEE/Postal code: 02531 /02160
- ^{1} French Land Register data, which excludes lakes, ponds, glaciers > 1 km^{2} (0.386 sq mi or 247 acres) and river estuaries.

Moussy-Verneuil (French pronunciation: [musi vɛʁnœj]) is a commune in the Aisne department in Hauts-de-France in northern France.

== Population ==
Historical population
Year	Pop.	±% p.a.
1968	128	—
1975	109	−2.27%
1982	92	−2.39%
1990	103	+1.42%
1999	113	+1.03%
2007	128	+1.57%
2012	127	−0.16%
2017	123	−0.64%
2023	141	+2.30%
Source: INSEE

== See also ==
- Communes of the Aisne department
