= L'Horizon chimérique =

Song cycle by Gabriel Fauré

- Song cycle by Gabriel Fauré
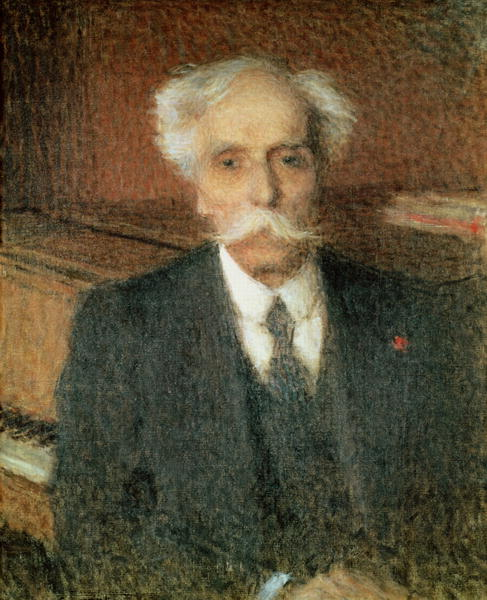
- The composer, portrayed by Ernest Joseph Laurent
- Opus: 118
- Text: Poems from L'horizon chimérique by Jean de La Ville de Mirmont
- Language: French
- Composed: 1921
- Performed: 13 May 1922
- Movements: four
- Scoring: voice and piano

L'Horizon chimérique, Op. 118, is a song cycle by Gabriel Fauré, of four mélodies for voice and piano. Composed in 1921, the cycle is based on four of the poems from the collection of the same name by Jean de La Ville de Mirmont.

== Composition ==
This was Fauré's last song cycle, composed in the autumn of 1921. Other late works he completed towards the end of 1921 were Cello Sonata No. 2, Op. 117, in November, and Nocturne No. 13, Op. 119, in December.

The song cycle was published by Durand in April 1922.

== Settings ==
Fauré's settings are as follows:

1. "La mer est infinie"
2. "Je me suis embarqué"
3. "Diane, Séléné"
4. "Vaisseaux, nous vous aurons aimés"

== Premiere ==
L'Horizon chimérique had its premiere at the Société Nationale de Musique on 13 May 1922, sung by baritone Charles Panzéra, to whom the cycle was dedicated. He was accompanied on the piano by his wife, Magdeleine Panzéra-Baillot. This concert also premiered Fauré's Cello Sonata No. 2. Shortly afterwards, on 20 June the Panzéras contributed a performance of L'Horizon chimérique to a celebration of Fauré's works held in the Sorbonne's Grand Amphitheatre, attended by President of France Alexandre Millerand.

Charles Panzéra recorded "Je me suis embarqué" and "Diane, Séléné" in 1925, and in 1936 recorded the complete song cycle. He described his performance technique for L'Horizon chimérique in his 1964 instructional work, 50 Mélodies françaises.

== Sources ==
- Fairman, Richard (1988). Blyth, Alan (ed.). Song on Record. Vol. 2. Cambridge: Cambridge University Press. ISBN 978-0-521-33155-5.
- Johnson, Graham (2009). Gabriel Fauré: The Songs and their Poets. London: Guildhall School of Music and Drama. ISBN 978-0-7546-5960-0.
- Nectoux, Jean-Michel (2004). Gabriel Fauré: A Musical Life. Cambridge: Cambridge University Press. ISBN 0-521-61695-6.
- Orledge, Robert (1979). Gabriel Fauré. London: Eulenburg Books. ISBN 0-903873-40-0.
