= Sonnet 114 =

« » Sonnet 114
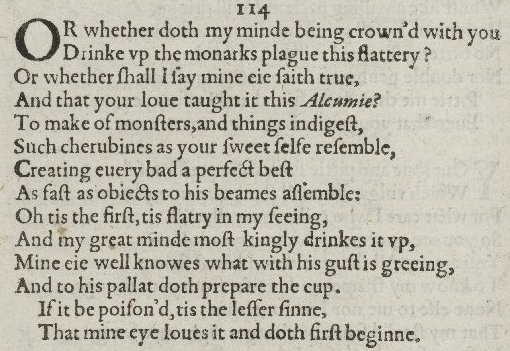
- Sonnet 114 in the 1609 Quarto
Q1
Q2
Q3
C
Or whether doth my mind, being crown’d with you,
Drink up the monarch’s plague, this flattery?
Or whether shall I say, mine eye saith true,
And that your love taught it this alchemy,
To make of monsters and things indigest
Such cherubins as your sweet self resemble,
Creating every bad a perfect best,
As fast as objects to his beams assemble?
O, ’tis the first; ’tis flattery in my seeing,
And my great mind most kingly drinks it up:
Mine eye well knows what with his gust is ’greeing,
And to his palate doth prepare the cup:
If it be poison’d, ’tis the lesser sin
That mine eye loves it and doth first begin.
—William Shakespeare
4
8
12
14

Sonnet 114 is one of 154 sonnets written by the English playwright and poet William Shakespeare. It is a member of the Fair Youth sequence, in which the poet expresses his love towards a young man.

== Synopsis ==
Is the poet's mind flattered, like a king, by the youth's presence, or is it simply a truth that is being told by his eyes that ugly things are made beautiful by the mental image of the youth? Surely it must be flattery, that he consumes like a king. He knows he enjoys it even if it's poisonous. Even if it is, it's less of a sin because his eye is motivated by love.

== Structure ==
Sonnet 114 is an English or Shakespearean sonnet. The English sonnet has three quatrains, followed by a final rhyming couplet. It follows the typical rhyme scheme of the form ABAB CDCD EFEF GG and is composed in iambic pentameter, a type of poetic metre based on five pairs of metrically weak/strong syllabic positions. The 7th line exemplifies a regular iambic pentameter:

  ×/ ×   /   ×  /  ×  /  ×    / 
Creating every bad a perfect best, (114.7)

Lines 6, 8, 9, and 11 have a final extrametrical syllable or feminine ending:

 ×     / × /   ×   ×     /    /    × / (×) 
Such cherubins as your sweet self resemble, (114.6)

/ = ictus, a metrically strong syllabic position. × = nonictus. (×) = extrametrical syllable.

Line 6 exhibits another metrical variation, the rightward movement of the third ictus (resulting in a four-position figure, × × / /, sometimes referred to as a minor ionic). Minor ionics may potentially be found in lines 5 and 10. Another metrical variation, a mid-line reversal, is found in line 4:

×     /   ×    /    /     ×    ×  /   × / 
And that your love taught it this alchemy, (114.4)

An initial reversal is potentially present in line 2.

The meter demands a few variant pronunciations: Line 1's "being" functions as one syllable, and line 9's "flattery" as two.
